= Opel Insignia =

Mid-size/large family car manufactured by Opel

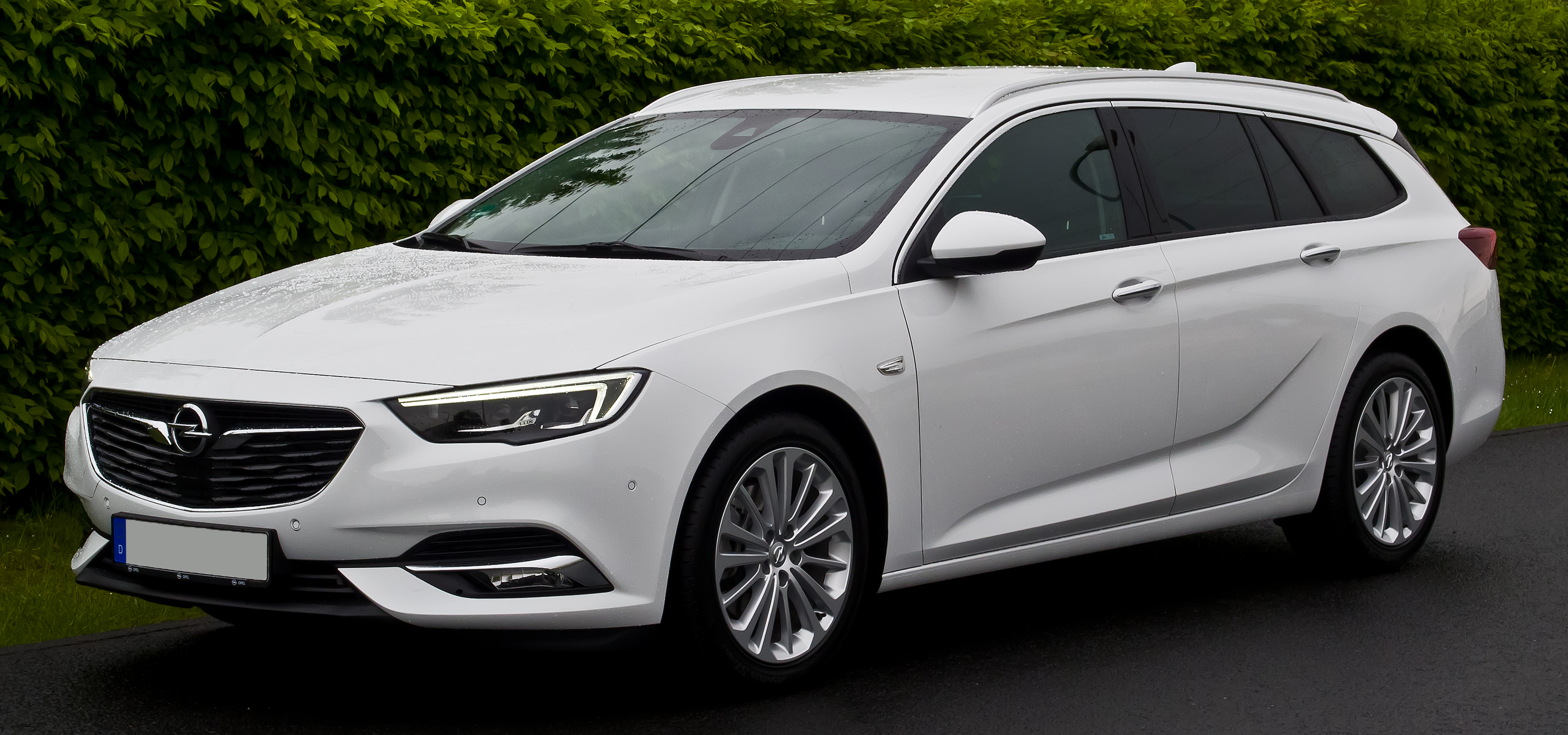

Overview
- Manufacturer: Opel (Note: General Motors (2008–2017); PSA Group (2017–2021); Stellantis (2021–present))
- Also called: Vauxhall Insignia (United Kingdom); Buick Regal (North America and China); Holden Insignia (Australia and New Zealand, 2008–2017); Holden Commodore (ZB) (Australia and New Zealand, 2018–2020)
- Production: 2008–2022

Body and chassis
- Class: Large family car (D)
- Layout: Front-engine, front-wheel-drive or all-wheel-drive

Chronology
- Predecessor: Opel Vectra; Opel Signum

The Opel Insignia is a large family car (D-segment in Europe) developed and produced by the German car manufacturer Opel from 2008 to 2022. Taking its name from a 2003 concept car, the model line serves as the flagship model, slotted above the Astra and Corsa in size. The Insignia serves as the successor to both the Signum and Vectra model lines, replacing both vehicles under a single nameplate. The model line was offered in four-door sedan/saloon body styles, five-door liftback, and as a five-door station wagon/estate.

Sold worldwide, the Insignia is marketed under multiple nameplates. Under Opel tradition, the model line is marketed by Vauxhall in the United Kingdom, taking on the Vauxhall Insignia name. Both generations of the model line have been marketed in North America and China as the Buick Regal (sales of the Regal continue in China). In South America, the vehicle was originally due to be marketed as the Chevrolet Vectra, but went on sale as the Opel Insignia instead. GM Australia marketed the second-generation Insignia as the Holden Commodore (ZB) until discontinuing both the model line and the Holden brand at the end of 2020.

The launch vehicle of the GM Epsilon II platform, Opel produces the Opel/Vauxhall Insignia in Adam Opel AG Werk Rüsselsheim in Rüsselsheim, Germany. SAIC-GM produces the Buick Regal in Shanghai, China (exclusively for the Chinese market).

In February 2022, Opel confirmed that the Insignia would be discontinued after the model completes its current generation lifecycle at the end of the year without a successor planned, due to poor sales and plans to shift Opel into selling the Astra, Corsa and SUVs like the new Frontera.

== History ==
In December 2006, Vauxhall stated they would retire the Vectra nameplate from the previous model. Then General Motors Europe president, Carl-Peter Forster, explained that the all new car would be "a radical departure" from the current model and that the "Vectra" name would be dropped to reflect this change. In late 2007, Vauxhall confirmed that the successor's name would be Insignia.

With the Insignia, Opel planned to regain some of the market share that the executive Omega once occupied during its production.

== First generation (G09; 2008) ==
Opel Insignia A
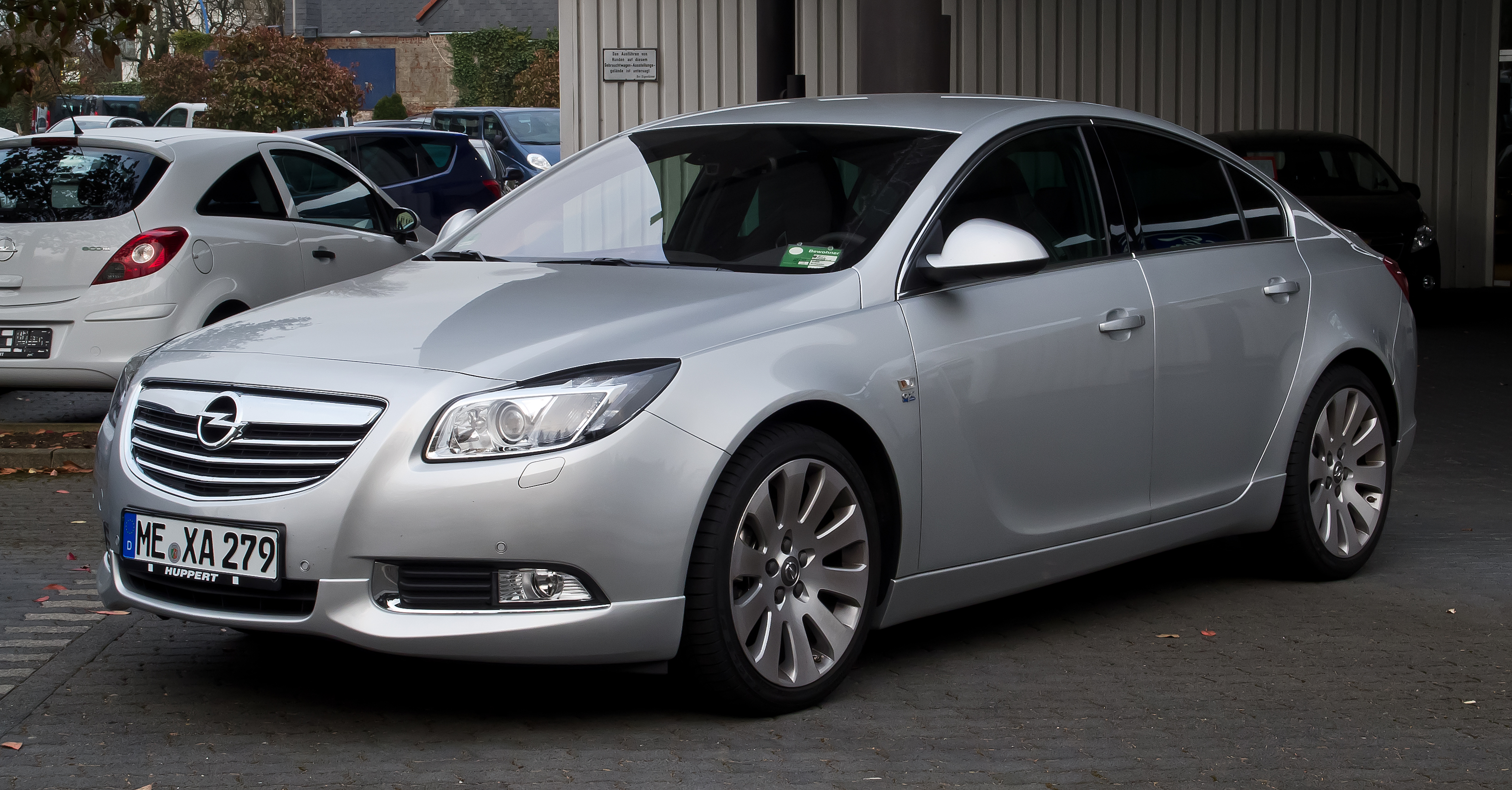

Overview
- Model code: G09
- Also called: Vauxhall Insignia (United Kingdom); Holden Insignia (Australia and New Zealand); Buick Regal (North America and China); Chevrolet Vectra (South America); Bitter Insignia
- Production: October 2008 – April 2017
- Assembly: Germany: Rüsselsheim; Canada: Oshawa, Ontario (Oshawa Assembly) (North American market Regal); China: Shanghai (SAIC-GM) (Chinese market Regal); Russia: Kaliningrad (Avtotor)
- Designer: Mark Adams, Malcolm Ward

Body and chassis
- Body style: 4-door saloon; 5-door liftback/fastback; 5-door estate
- Platform: GM Epsilon II SWB
- Related: Chevrolet Malibu

Powertrain
- Engine: Petrol: 1.4 L A14NET (LUJ) I4-T; 1.6 L A16XER (LDE) I4; 1.6 L A16LET (LLU) I4-T; 1.6 L A16XHT (LVP) I4-T; 1.8 L A18XER (2H0) (F18DA) I4; 2.0 L LDK I4-T; 2.0 L LTG I4-T; 2.8 L LP9 V6-T; Diesel: 1.6 L CDTI Ecotec I4-T; 2.0 L Multijet II I4-T
- Transmission: 6-speed manual 6-speed automatic

Dimensions
- Wheelbase: 2,737 mm (107.8 in)
- Length: 4,830 mm (190.2 in); 4,908 mm (193.2 in) (wagon)
- Width: 1,856 mm (73.1 in)
- Height: 1,498 mm (59.0 in)
- Curb weight: 1,470–1,610 kg (3,240–3,550 lb)

The Insignia debuted as the Vauxhall Insignia at the 2008 British International Motor Show in London on 23 July. It then went on sale in European dealerships in October 2008 for the 2009 model year as a five-door liftback and five-door estate dubbed Sports Tourer – a departure for Opel which traditionally used the "Caravan" name to denote the estate bodystyle. It was the first production car to be based on the Epsilon II platform, which was also used on other models such as the 2010 Saab 9-5 and the Chevrolet Malibu.

Design wise, the Insignia offers 30 mm (1.2 in) more knee room than the Vectra. The saloon and liftback variants have the same 4.83 m (190.2 in) length, while the estate version is slightly longer at 4.91 m (193.3 in). All three models share the same, 2.73-metre (107.5 in) wheelbase.

The Insignia also marked the debut of redesigned badges for both the Opel and Vauxhall brands. For Vauxhall, it was the first car to dispense with the characteristic "V" grille that has adorned Vauxhall models since 1994, which had helped differentiate them from the otherwise identical Opel models.

The Insignia was also the first Opel to debut many new and improved safety features, including:

- Improved adaptive Forward Lighting – bi-xenon, gas discharge headlamps with variable light beam distribution in width, direction and range. Advanced Front-Lighting System (AFS), static cornering light, complemented by daytime running lights with LEDs. Sensors and software monitor the surroundings, traffic and weather conditions so that the system can activate the appropriate lighting function.
- Opel Eye – This uses a camera at the top of the windscreen to monitor the area in front of the vehicle. Information from the camera is continuously analysed to identify road markings and traffic signs. Road markings are used as the basis of the first of Opel Eye's two functions: lane departure warning. Traffic signs are recognised and indicated to the driver in the second function: traffic sign memory. At speeds above 60 km/h (37 mph), Opel Eye warns the driver if the car is about to veer inadvertently out of the lane in which it is travelling. The system can detect road markings and, if they are sufficiently distinct, unmarked road edges. The Insignia was the first production car to feature a dual function frontal camera with traffic sign recognition.

A small number (17 examples) of the Insignia OPC were modified by Erich Bitter and sold as the "Bitter Insignia". Only available with the 2.8 Turbo engine, these luxurious derivatives received a new front clip and other exterior modifications, as well as a more luxurious, all-leather interior, where as much plastic as possible was replaced with other materials.

=== Pre-facelift ===
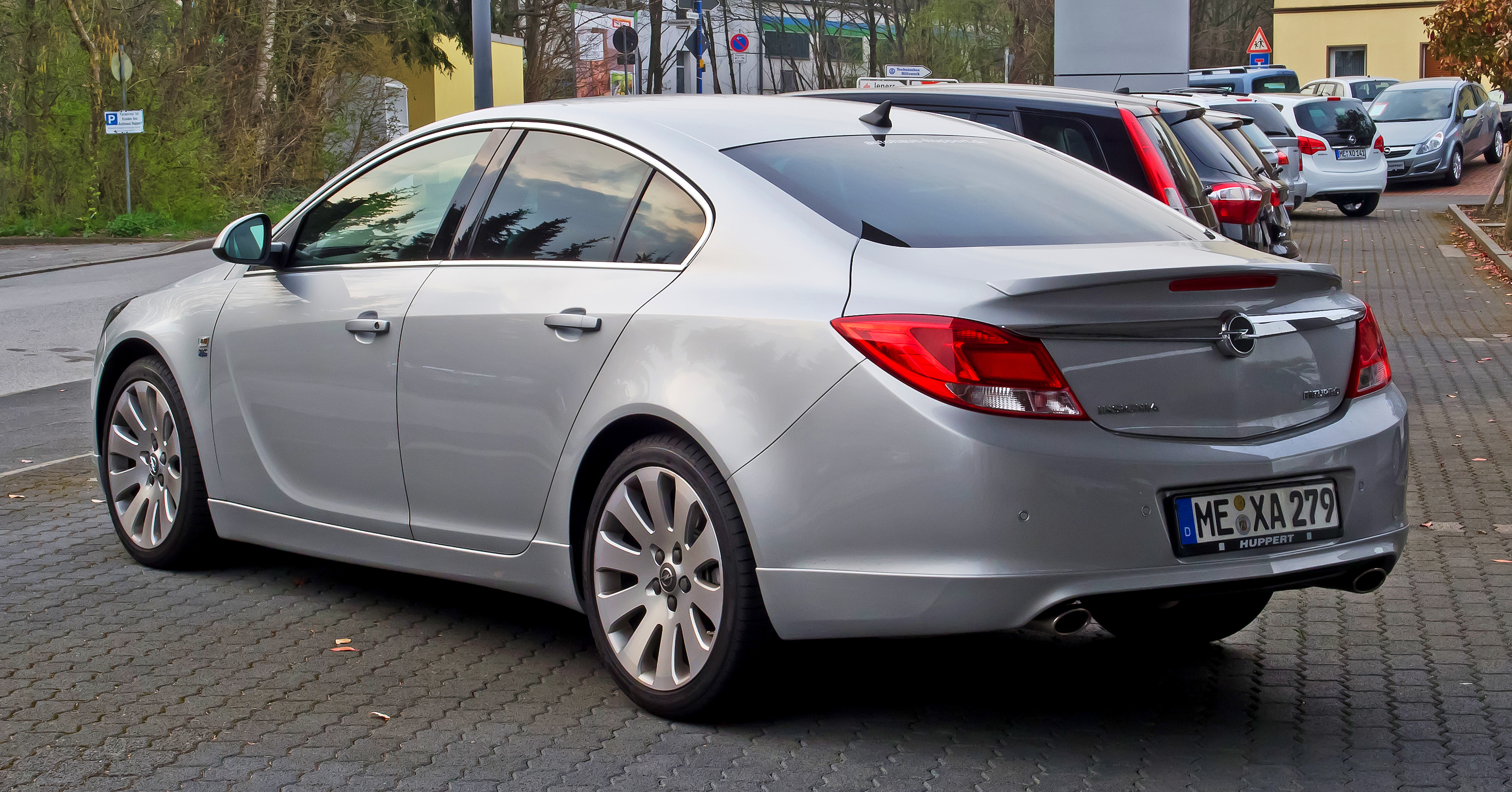
Opel Insignia saloon (2008–2013)

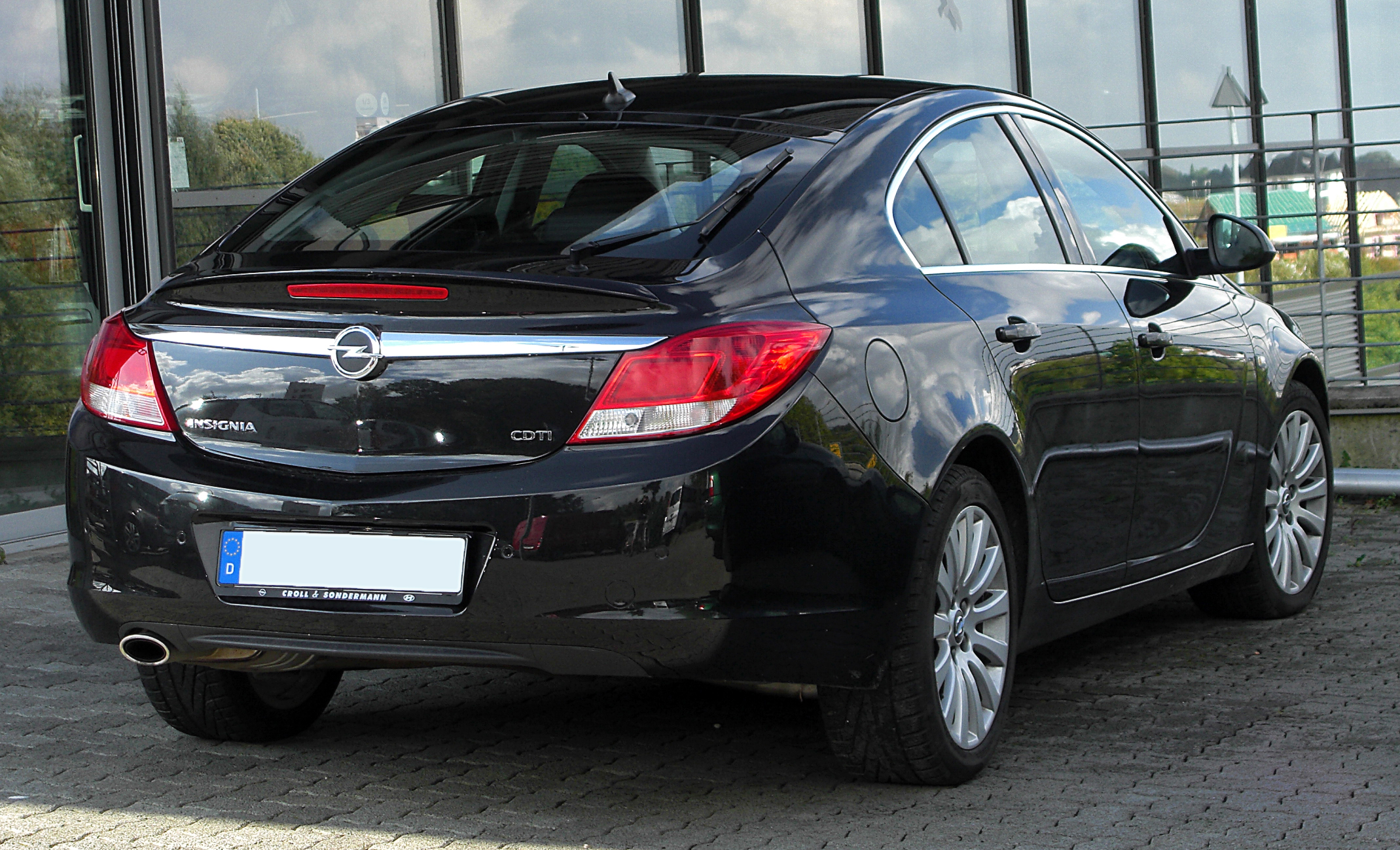
Opel Insignia liftback/fastback (2008–2013)

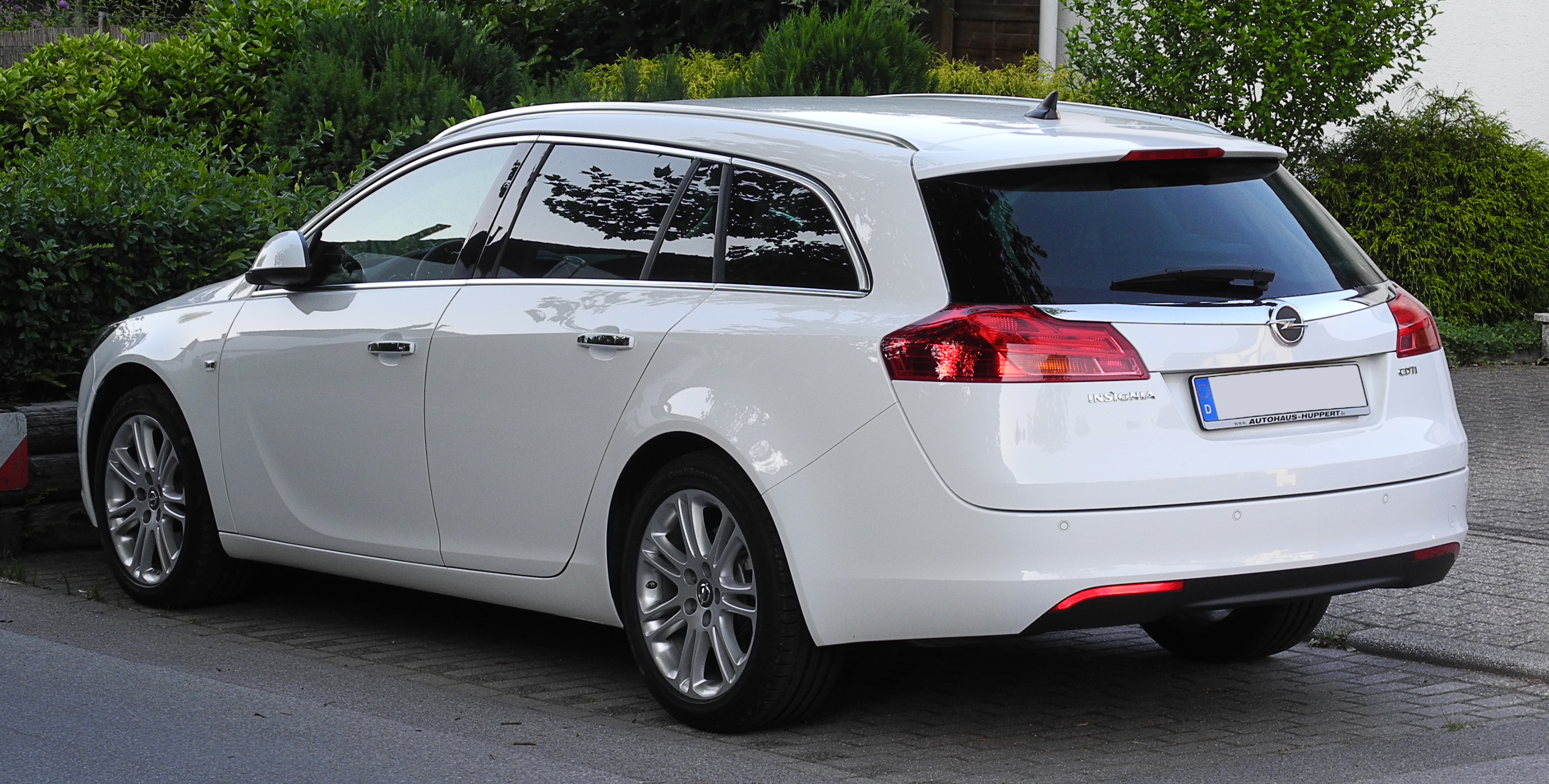
Opel Insignia Sports Tourer (2008–2013)

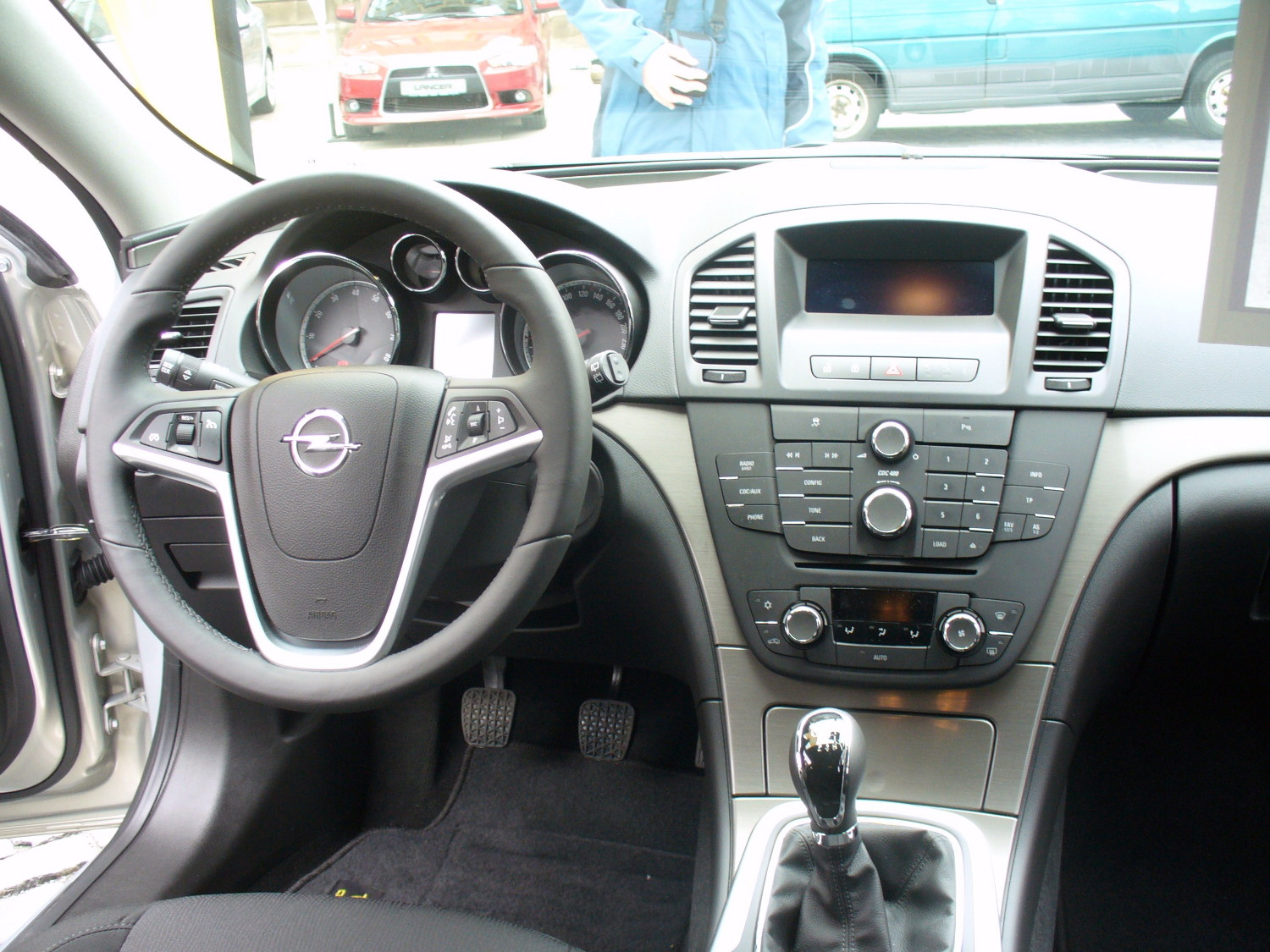
Interior

=== Markets ===
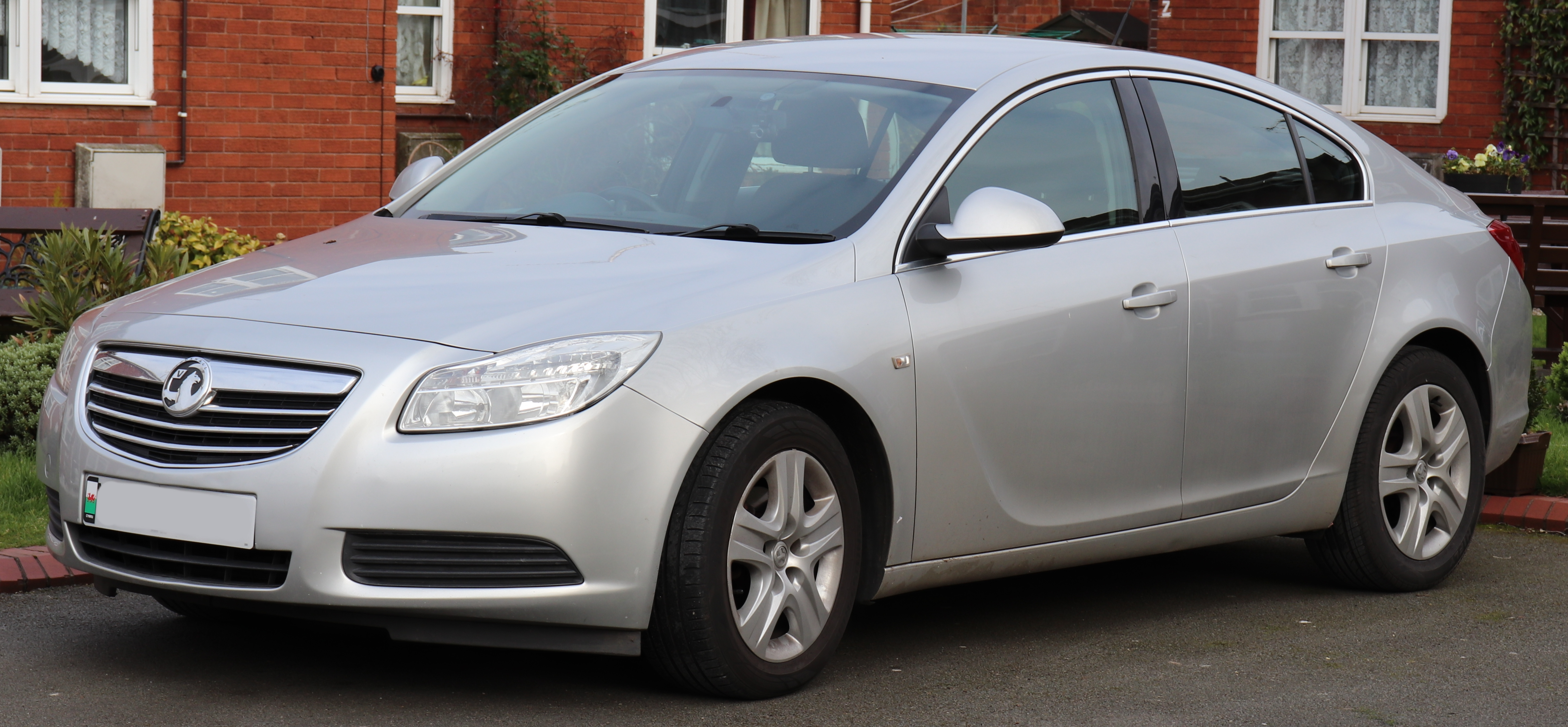
Vauxhall Insignia (United Kingdom; pre facelift)

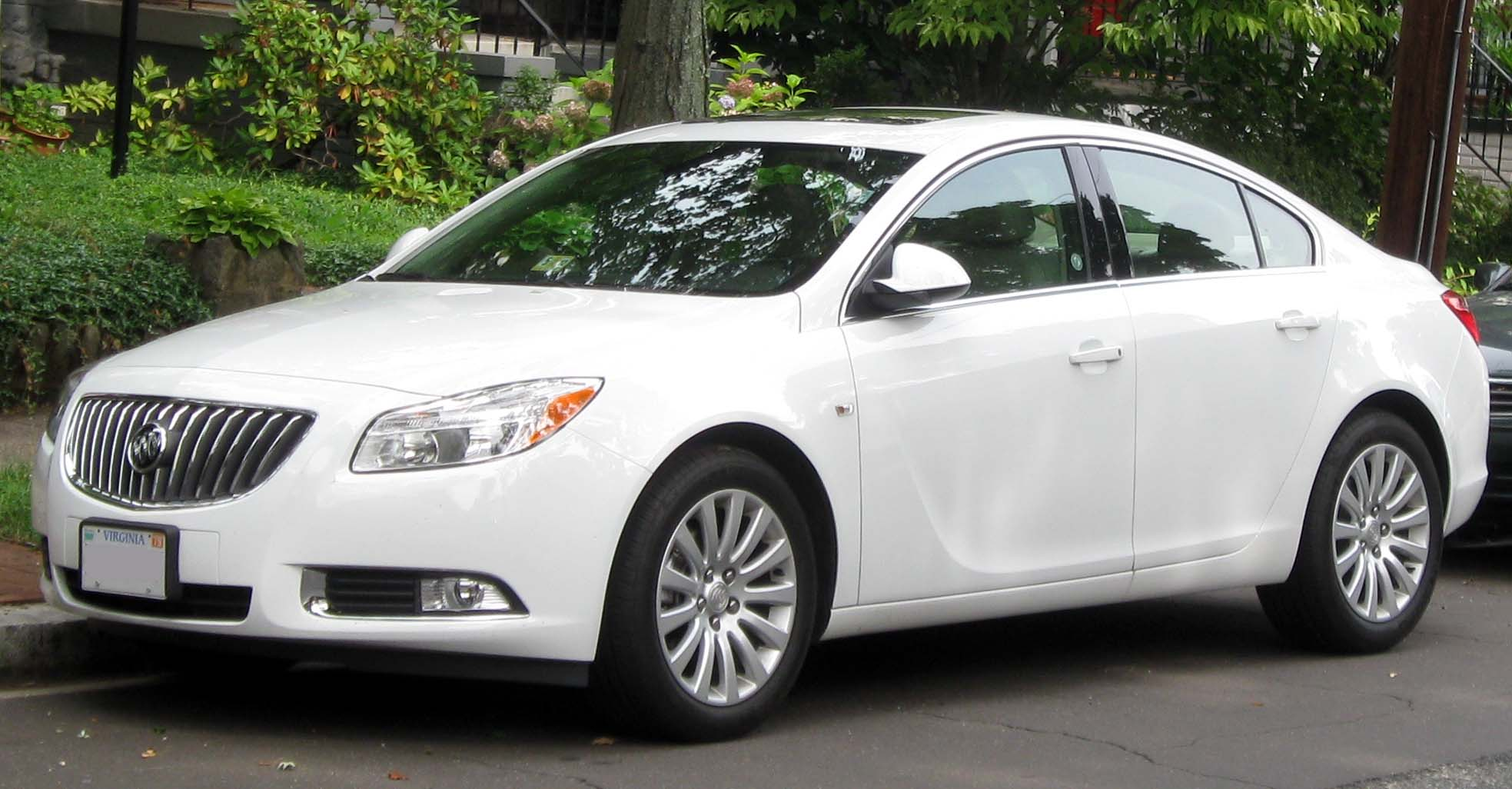
Buick Regal (North America)

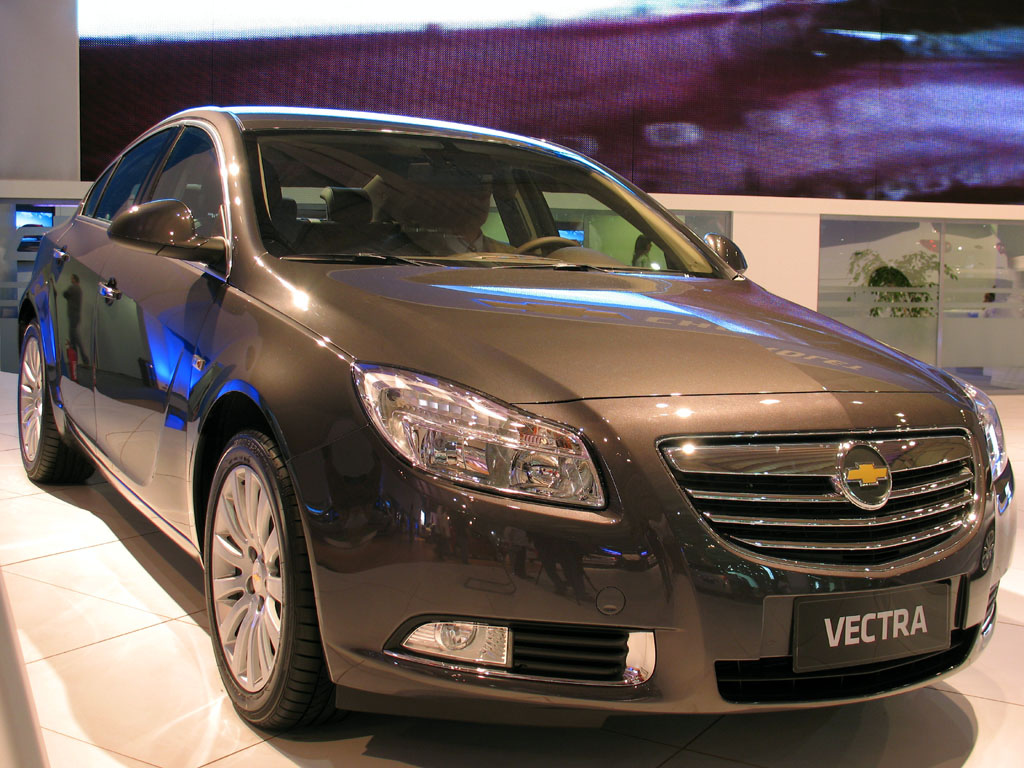
Chevrolet Vectra (South America)

=== OPC ===
In early 2009, Opel revealed the Insignia OPC, a high performance variant of the Insignia. Like the preceding Vectra OPC, it is powered by a 2.8 litre single-turbo V6 (Manufactured in Melbourne, Australia).

The updated engine makes 239 kW (325 PS; 321 hp) and 435 N⋅m (321 lb⋅ft). Of this 435, 400 N⋅m (295 lb⋅ft) are available from 2,000 rpm. It is paired with a six speed manual transmission / six-speed automatic transmission and Saab's (Haldex) active all wheel drive system. The Insignia OPC has a modified MacPherson strut front suspension called HiPerStrut which reduces torque steer.

Also standard is an electronic limited-slip differential for the rear wheels and Opel's FlexRide adaptive suspension, which has three settings (OPC, Sport, and Normal). An OPC version of the Insignia Sports Tourer wagon was also unveiled. In April 2011, Opel launched the Insignia OPC Unlimited, with no speed limiter.

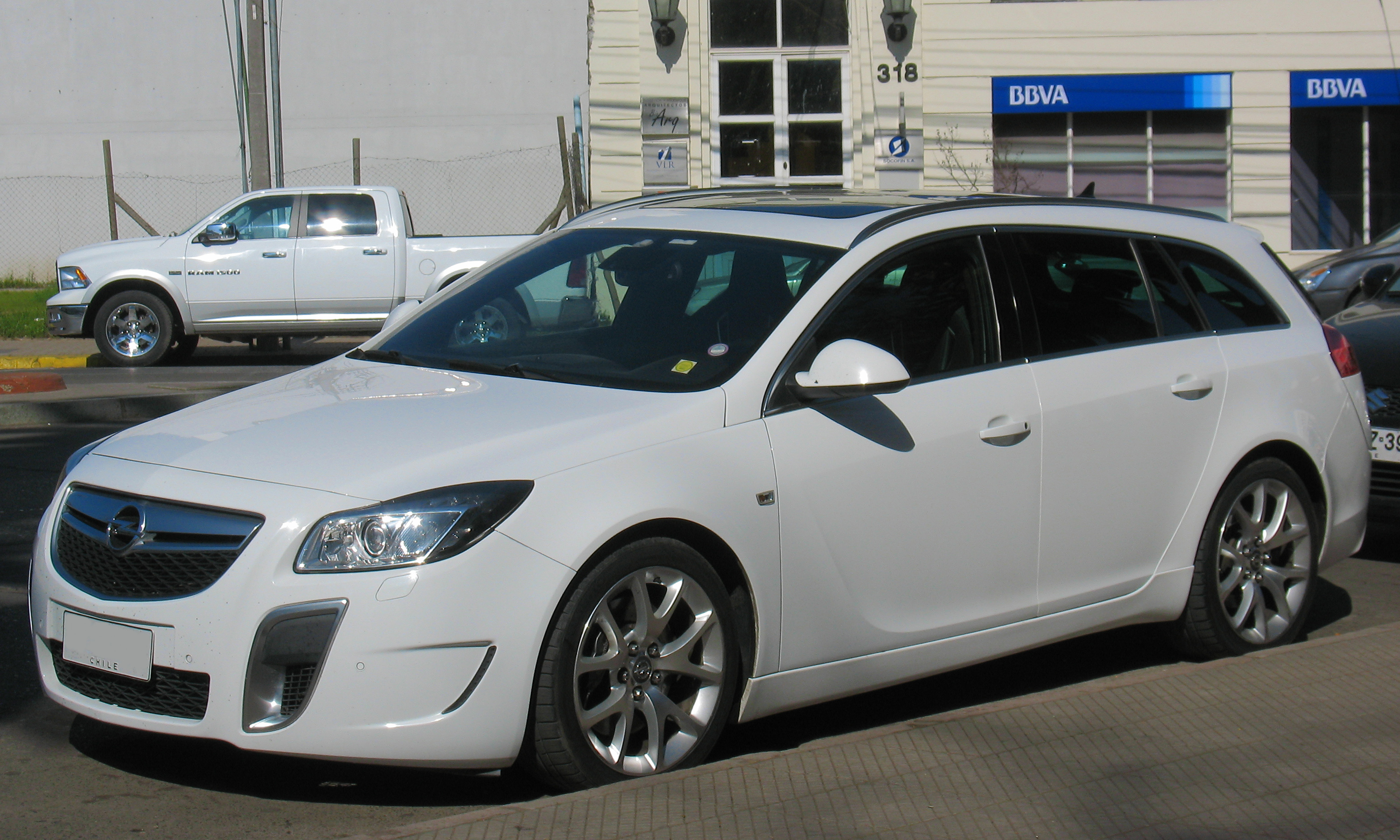
Opel Insignia OPC Sports Tourer (pre-facelift)

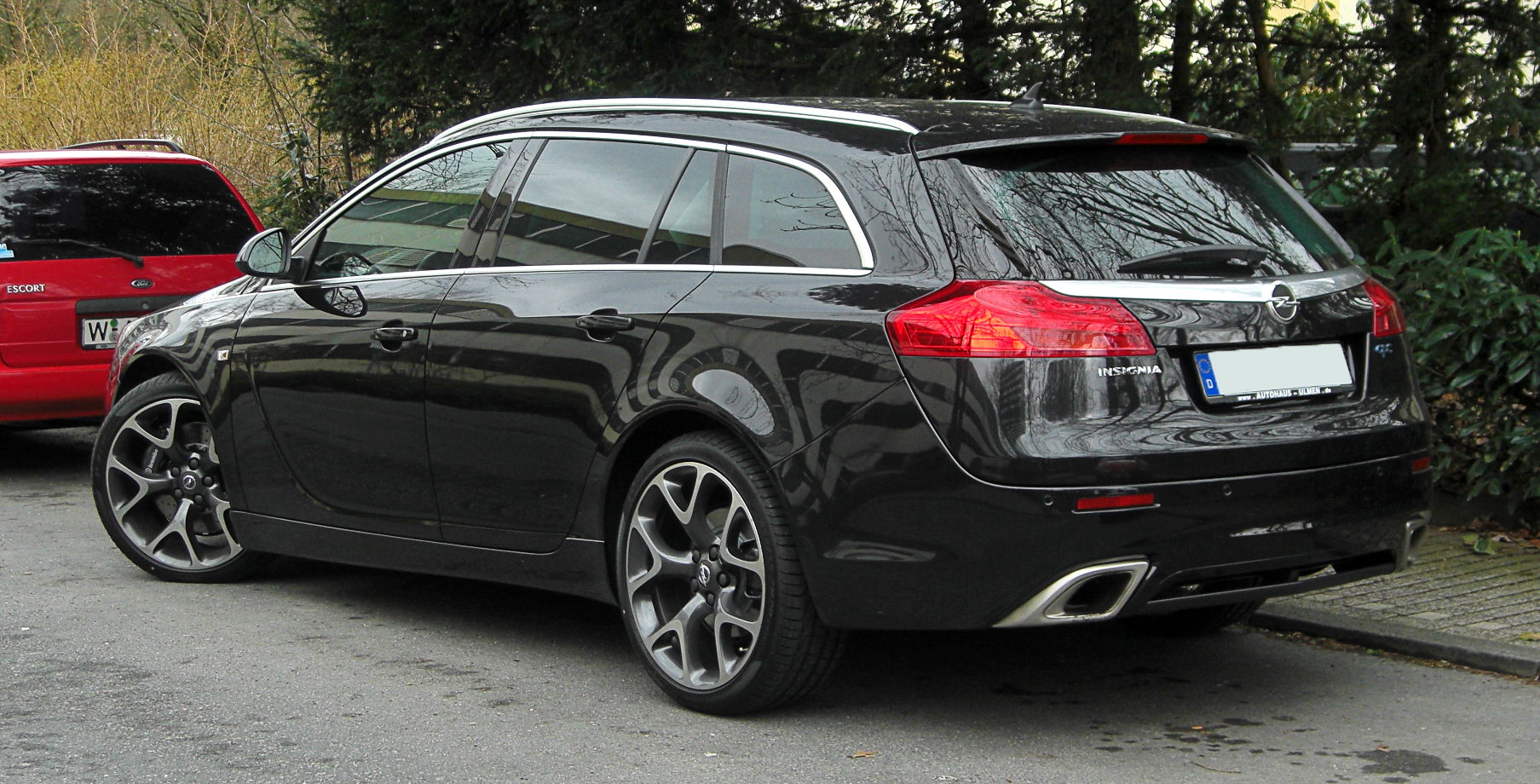
Opel Insignia OPC Sports Tourer

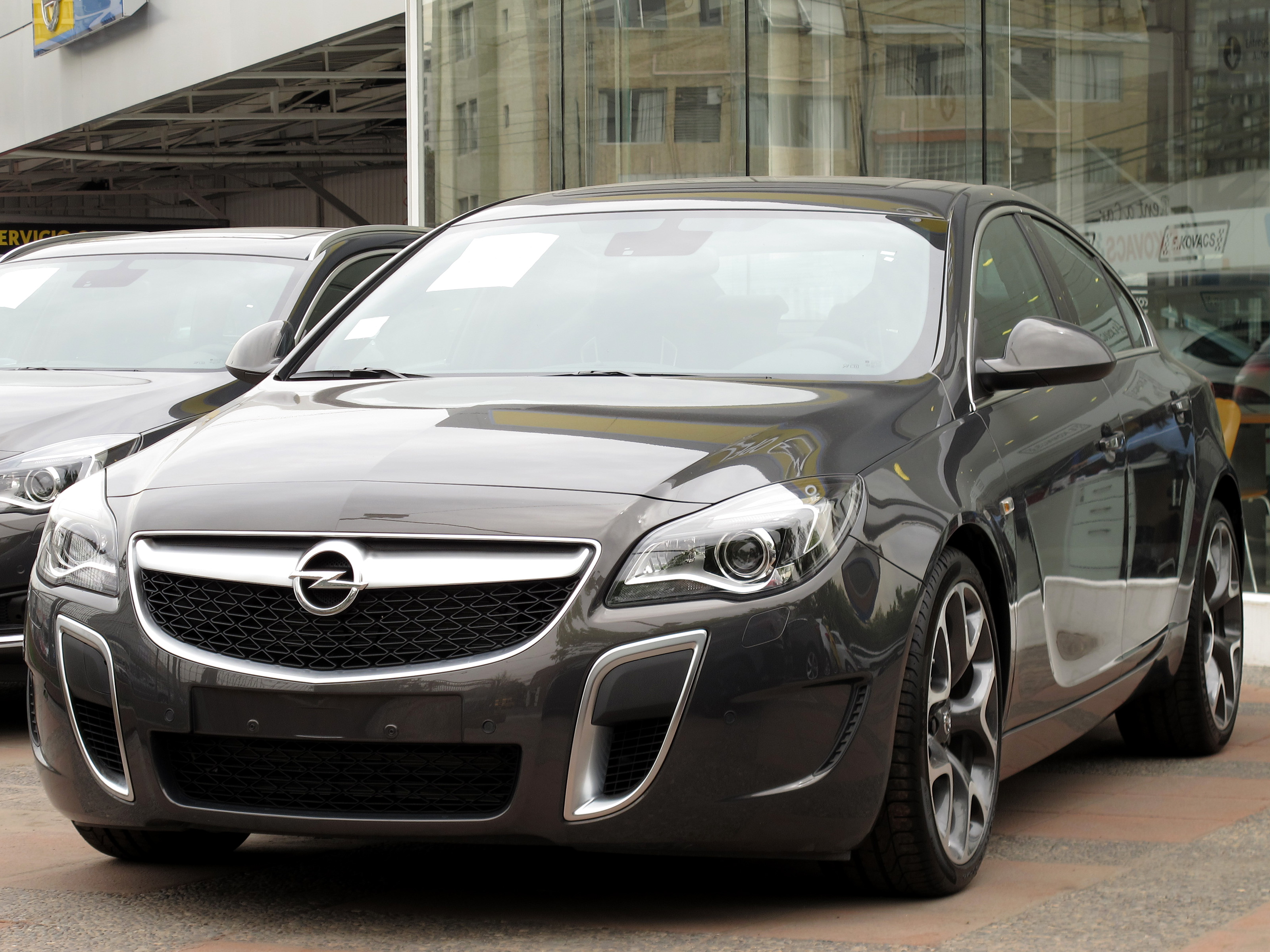
Opel Insignia OPC (facelift)

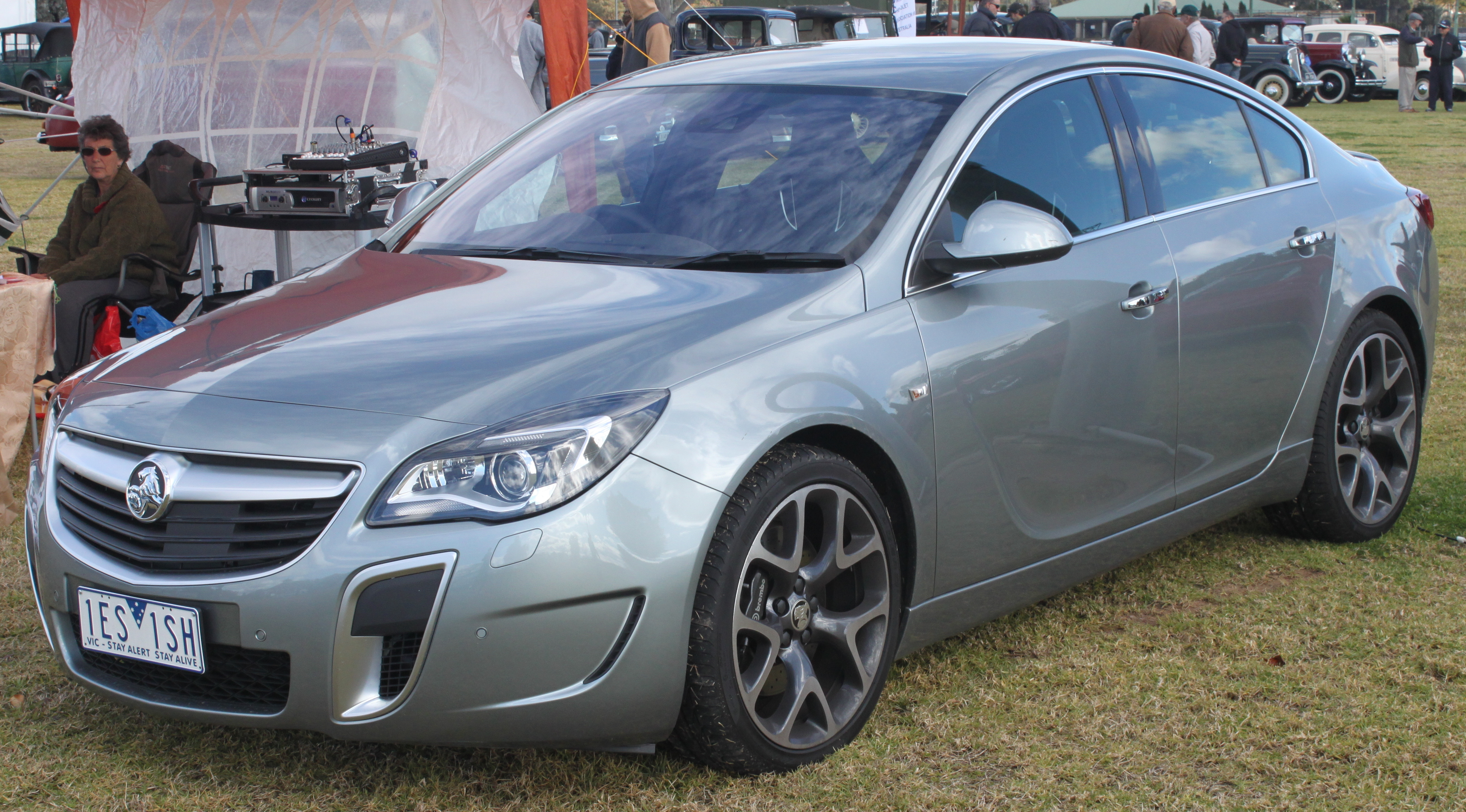
Holden Insignia VXR sedan (Australia; facelift)

=== Country Tourer ===
The Opel Insignia Country Tourer made its world premiere at the Frankfurt Motor Show in September 2013 as a crossover-styled station wagon.

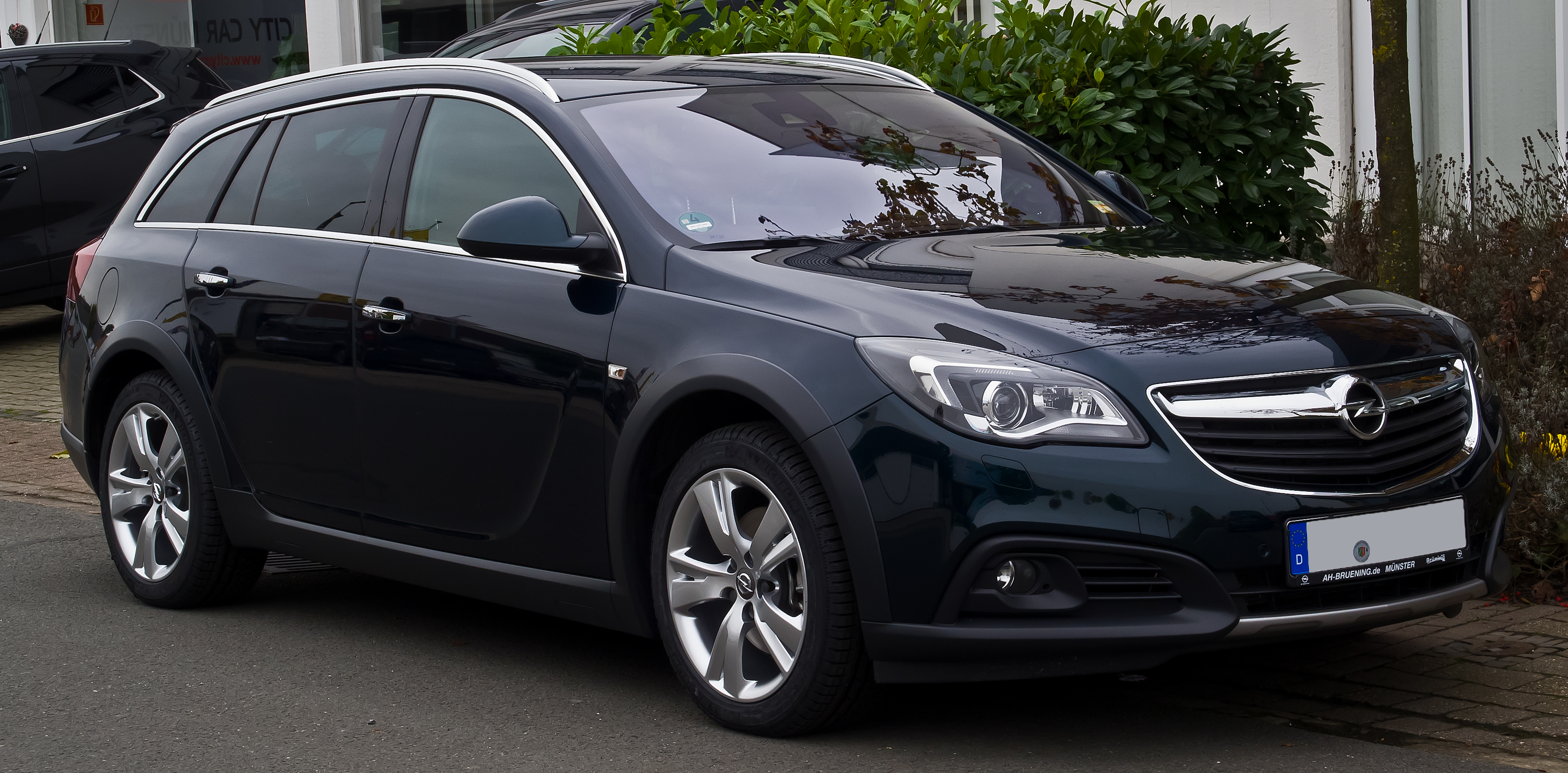
Opel Insignia Country Tourer

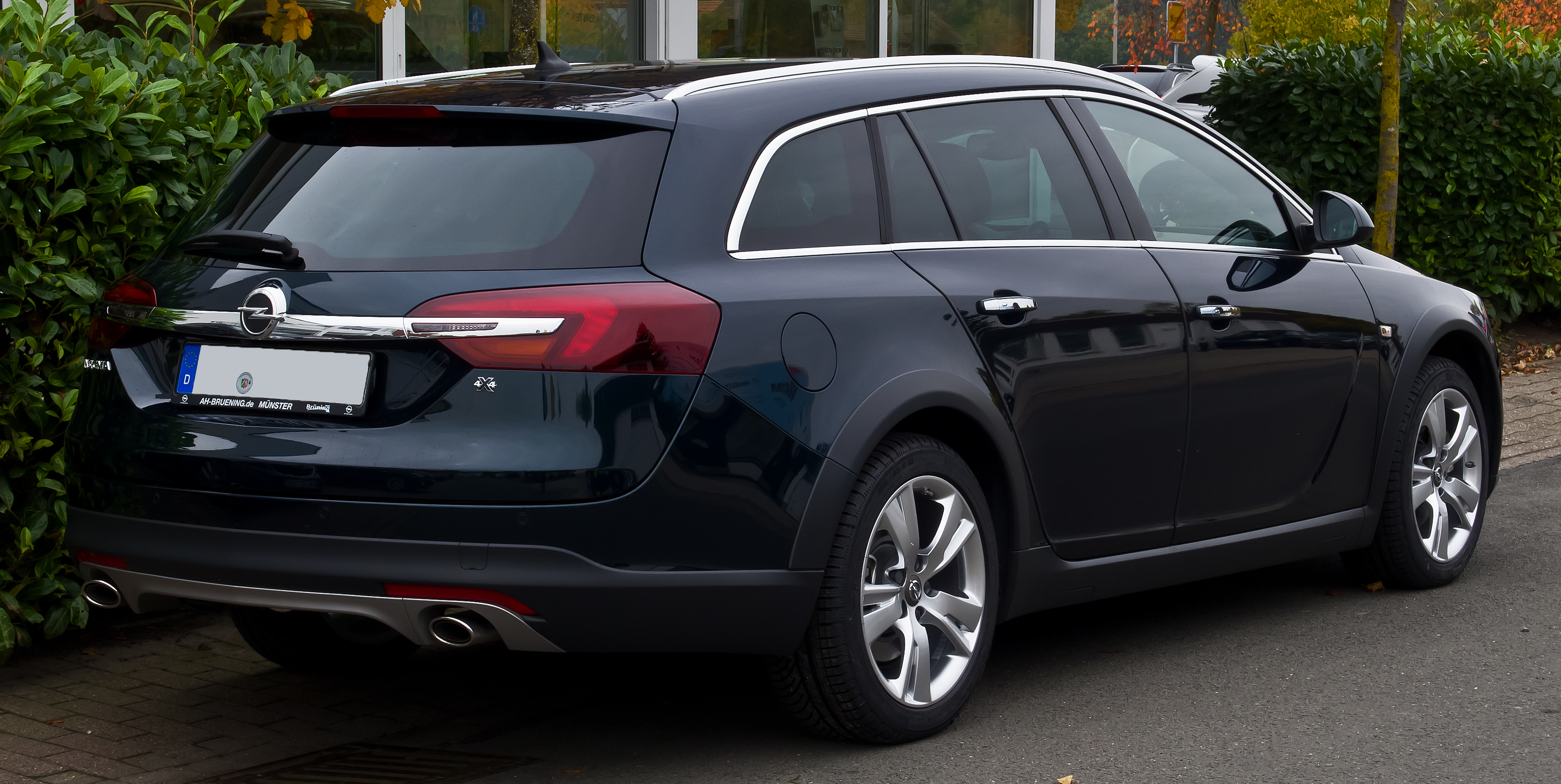
Opel Insignia Country Tourer

=== Facelift ===
A major facelift was introduced in June 2013, with new exterior and interior styling, new engines, and new safety features. The car officially premiered at the September 2013 Frankfurt Motor Show, before going on sale later in 2013.

The new design includes a newly designed cockpit with a simplified control panel and two eight inch colour displays, a four way infotainment system via new a touchpad in the centre console, an eight-inch touchscreen, steering wheel controls, voice command, radar and camera based driver assistance and safety systems, such as full speed adaptive cruise control and imminent collision braking, rear camera, lane change assistance, blind spot alert, and rear cross traffic alert.

The second generation Insignia was revealed in December 2016, and was reported to be renamed Insignia Grand Sport.

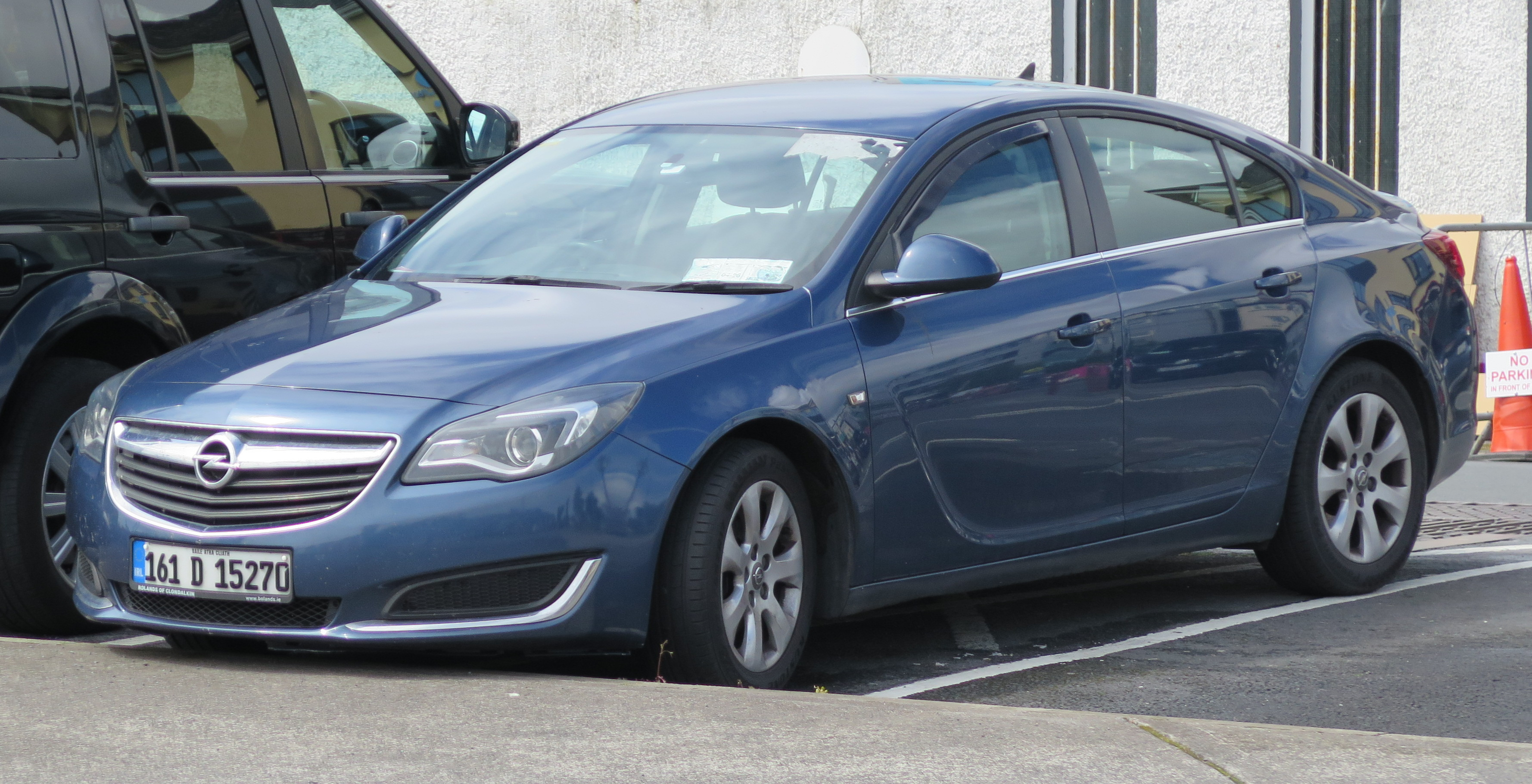
Opel Insignia (facelift)

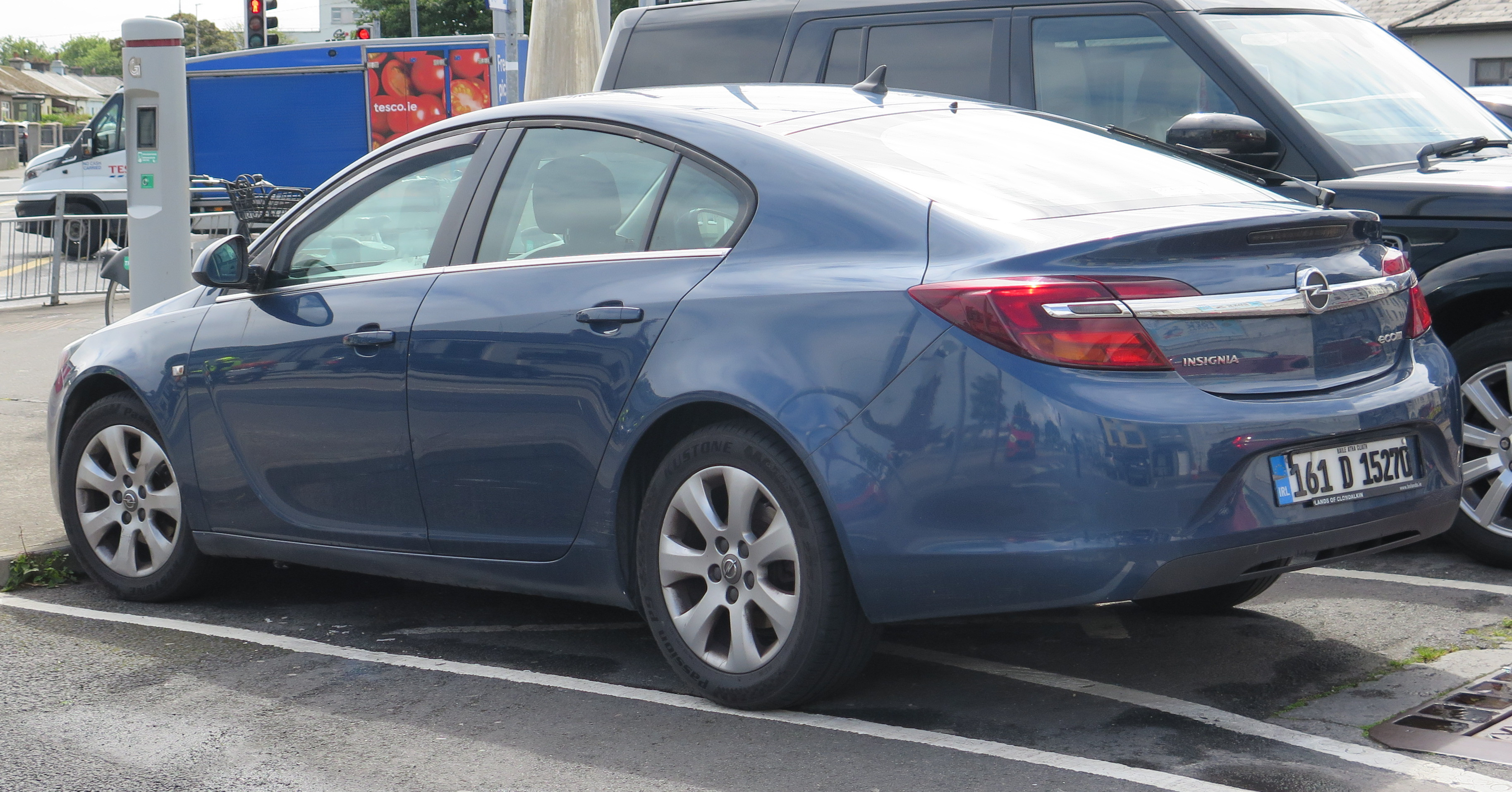
Opel Insignia (facelift)

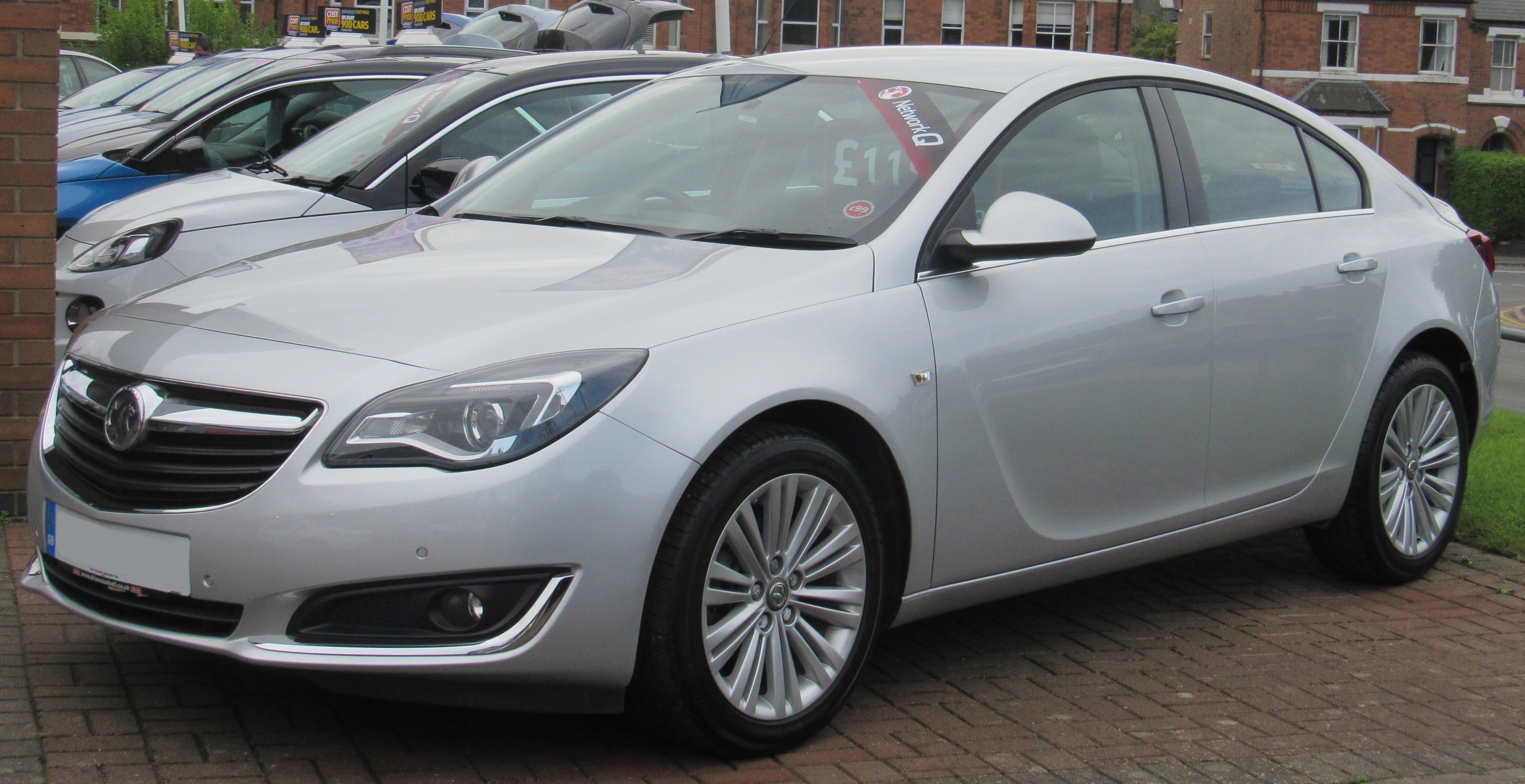
Vauxhall Insignia (facelift)

=== Engines ===
==== 2008–2013 ====
From launch, the Insignia was offered with four petrol engines:

1.6 L 115 PS (85 kW; 113 hp); 1.8 L 140 PS (103 kW; 138 hp); 2.0 L Turbo 220 PS (162 kW; 217 hp); 2.8 L V6 with 260 PS (191 kW; 256 hp) –

and three diesel engines (all derived from the Fiat/GM JTD engine), all displacing 2.0 litres:

2.0 L 110 PS (81 kW; 108 hp); 2.0 L 130 PS (96 kW; 128 hp); 2.0 L 160 PS (118 kW; 158 hp).

In 2009, a 1.6 L Turbo petrol 180 PS (132 kW; 178 hp), the ecoFLEX diesels, and the OPC versions were introduced.

From September 2010, the 2.0 CDTi diesel engine gained Adaptive 4x4 as an option. A 2.0 BiTurbo CDTI developed with the help of Saab, with 195 PS (143 kW; 192 hp), was expected to begin production in 2010. Due to the sale of Saab, production was delayed until 2012. The BiTurbo CDTI was offered with front- or four-wheel drive. All engines have a six speed manual transmission as standard, with some engines having an automatic transmission as an option.

Since launch, all diesels have improved their emissions. In 2011, some engines gained Start/Stop, all diesel engines have this option, with more petrol engines expected to gain the technology in the future. A 1.4 Turbo 140 PS (103 kW; 138 hp), with S/S as standard, became available - replacing the 1.8 - and the 2.0 Turbo with four-wheel drive was upgraded to 250 PS (184 kW; 247 hp); the front-wheel drive 2.0 Turbo still had 220 PS (162 kW; 217 hp).

In 2009, a new range of ecoFLEX diesel engine offered same amount of power, but less CO_{2}-emission (g/km) and fuel consumption. The 2.0 CDTI ecoFLEX with 130 PS (96 kW; 128 hp) and 160 PS (118 kW; 158 hp) have emission of only 114 CO_{2}-emission (g/km), as well as a version with 2.0 CDTI 4x4. The 195 PS (143 kW; 192 hp) Bi turbo diesel engine has 129 CO_{2}-emission (g/km).

Petrol engines
Model	Engine	Displacement	Power	Torque	Note(s)	Year(s)
1.4 Turbo S/S	I4	1,364 cc	140 PS (103 kW; 138 hp) at 4,900–6000 rpm	200 N⋅m (148 lb⋅ft) at 1850–4,900 rpm		2011–13
1.6 VVT	I4	1,598 cc	115 PS (85 kW; 113 hp) at 6,000 rpm	155 N⋅m (114 lb⋅ft) at 4,000 rpm		2008–12
1.6 Turbo	I4	1,598 cc	180 PS (132 kW; 178 hp) at 5,500 rpm	230 N⋅m (170 lb⋅ft) at 2,200–5,500 rpm		
1.8 VVT	I4	1,796 cc	140 PS (103 kW; 138 hp) at 6,300 rpm	175 N⋅m (129 lb⋅ft) at 3,800 rpm		
2.0 Turbo	I4	1,998 cc	220 PS (162 kW; 217 hp) at 5,300 rpm	350 N⋅m (258 lb⋅ft) at 2,000-4000 rpm	A20NHT (non-flex fuel version of A20NFT)	2008–13
2.0 Turbo 4x4	I4	1,998 cc	220 PS (162 kW; 217 hp) at 5,300 rpm	350 N⋅m (258 lb⋅ft) at 2,000-4000 rpm		2008–11
2.0 Turbo 4x4	I4	1,998 cc	250 PS (184 kW; 247 hp) at 5,300 rpm	400 N⋅m (295 lb⋅ft) at 2,400–3,600 rpm		2011–13
2.8T 4x4	V6	2,792 cc	260 PS (191 kW; 256 hp) at 5,500 rpm	350 N⋅m (258 lb⋅ft) at 1,900–4500 rpm		2008–13
2.8T 4x4	V6	2,792 cc	325 PS (239 kW; 321 hp) at 5,500 rpm	435 N⋅m (321 lb⋅ft) at 5,500 rpm	OPC/VXR	2009–13
Diesel engines
Model	Engine	Displacement	Power	Torque	Note(s)	Year(s)
2.0 CDTI	I4	1,956 cc	110 PS (81 kW; 108 hp) at 4,000 rpm	260 N⋅m (192 lb⋅ft) at 1,750–2500 rpm	N/A in UK	
2.0 CDTI	I4	1,956 cc	130 PS (96 kW; 128 hp) at 4,000 rpm	300 N⋅m (221 lb⋅ft) at 1,750–2500 rpm		
2.0 CDTI	I4	1,956 cc	160 PS (118 kW; 158 hp) at 4,000 rpm	350 N⋅m (258 lb⋅ft) at 1,750–2500 rpm		
2.0 CDTI 4x4	I4	1,956 cc	160 PS (118 kW; 158 hp) at 4,000 rpm	350 N⋅m (258 lb⋅ft) at 1,750–2500 rpm		2010–13
2.0 CDTI Bi-Turbo	I4	1,956 cc	195 PS (143 kW; 192 hp) at 4,000 rpm	400 N⋅m (295 lb⋅ft) at 1,750–2500 rpm		2012–13
2.0 CDTI Bi-Turbo 4x4	I4	1,956 cc	195 PS (143 kW; 192 hp) at 4,000 rpm	400 N⋅m (295 lb⋅ft) at 1,750–2500 rpm		2012–13

==== 2013–2017 ====
Alongside the facelift of 2013 came a new range of engines – some existing, some tweaked, and some brand new. Diesel engines available at launch include the 2.0 CDTI ecoFLEX (also with Start/Stop), with outputs of 120 PS, 140 PS, and 163 PS and the existing 195 PS BiTurbo. There is also a non ecoFLEX engine with 130 PS which is only available with automatic transmission.

Petrol engines include the existing 1.4 Turbo and 1.8 (only on some markets), and the all new 1.6 SIDI Turbo engine introduced in the Cascada, and new 2.0 SIDI Turbo.

All engines come with a six speed manual gearbox as standard, with a six speed automatic available as an option on the 1.6 and 2.0 SIDI turbo petrol engines, and the 2.0 CDTI 163 PS and 195 PS diesel engines. All petrol and diesel engines have a Start/Stop system except the 2.0 CDTI with 130 PS.

In September 2014, Opel introduced its all new generation of engines – large diesel engine, starting with 2.0 CDTI engine with 170 PS and 400 Nm, which is a part of new strategy in which Opel will introduce 17 new engines in a period from 2014 to 2018. The new engine became available from the end of 2014/beginning of 2015.

Petrol engines
Model	Engine	Displacement	Power	Torque	Note(s)	CO_{2} (g/km)	Year(s)
1.4 Turbo S/S	I4	1,362 cc	140 PS (103 kW; 138 hp) at 4,900–6000 rpm	200 N⋅m (148 lb⋅ft) at 1850–4,900 rpm		123	
1.6 SIDI Turbo S/S	I4	1,598 cc	170 PS (125 kW; 168 hp) at 4,250 rpm	260 N⋅m (192 lb⋅ft) (overboost 280 N⋅m (207 lb⋅ft)) at 1,650–4,250 rpm		139	
1.8 VVT	I4	1,796 cc	140 PS (103 kW; 138 hp) at 6,300 rpm	175 N⋅m (129 lb⋅ft) at 3,800 rpm		164	
2.0 SIDI Turbo S/S	I4	1,998 cc	250 PS (184 kW; 247 hp) at 4,500 rpm	400 N⋅m (295 lb⋅ft) at 2,000–4,500 rpm	A20NFT (used in Astra J GTC VXR/OPC)	169	
Diesel engines
Model	Engine	Displacement	Power	Torque	Note(s)	CO_{2} (g/km)	Year(s)
1.6 CDTI	I4	1,598 cc	120 PS (88 kW; 118 hp) at 4,000 rpm	320 N⋅m (236 lb⋅ft) at 2,000 rpm		109-104	2015–17
1.6 CDTI	I4	1,598 cc	136 PS (100 kW; 134 hp) at 4,000 rpm	320 N⋅m (236 lb⋅ft) at 2,000 rpm		104-99	2015–17
2.0 CDTI ecoFLEX S/S	I4	1,956 cc	120 PS (88 kW; 118 hp) at 4,000 rpm	300 N⋅m (221 lb⋅ft) (overboost 320 N⋅m (236 lb⋅ft)) at 1,750–2,500 rpm		99	2013–15
2.0 CDTI	I4	1,956 cc	130 PS (96 kW; 128 hp) at 4,000 rpm	300 N⋅m (221 lb⋅ft) (overboost 320 N⋅m (236 lb⋅ft)) at 1,750–2,500 rpm	Only with AT	119	2013–15
2.0 CDTI ecoFLEX S/S	I4	1,956 cc	140 PS (103 kW; 138 hp) at 4,000 rpm	350 N⋅m (258 lb⋅ft) (overboost 370 N⋅m (273 lb⋅ft)) at 1,750–2,500 rpm		99	2013–15
2.0 CDTI ecoFLEX S/S	I4	1,956 cc	163 PS (120 kW; 161 hp) at 4,000 rpm	350 N⋅m (258 lb⋅ft) (overboost 380 N⋅m (280 lb⋅ft)) at 1,750–2,500 rpm		114	2013–15
2.0 CDTI ecoFLEX S/S	I4	1,956 cc	170 PS (125 kW; 168 hp) at 4,000 rpm	400 N⋅m (295 lb⋅ft) at 1,750–2,500 rpm		114	2014–17
2.0 CDTI Bi-Turbo ecoFLEX S/S	I4	1,956 cc	195 PS (143 kW; 192 hp) at 4,000 rpm	400 N⋅m (295 lb⋅ft) at 1,750–2,500 rpm		125	2013–15

=== Awards ===
Since making its début, the Opel Insignia has won more than fifty national and international awards, including 'Best Executive Car' in the United Kingdom and Slovenia, 'Best Family Car' in Ireland twice, and best car for fleet customers in the United Kingdom, Austria, Denmark, and Portugal.

- The Insignia was voted 2009 European Car of the Year.
- The Insignia scored a five star rating in EuroNCAP.
- In 2011, German institute DEKRA gave Opel an award for the Insignia as a car with the fewest flaws in its class.
- In 2012, Gesellschaft für Technische Überwachung mbH/Association for Technical Supervision evaluated Opel Insignia as number one in terms of used car quality.

=== Production and sales ===
Production started at the end of 2008 on all major markets in Europe. At launch, the Vauxhall versions were produced in Exclusiv, S, SE, SRi, Elite, and VXR specification levels. It was a popular choice with British buyers, being the nation's ninth best selling car in 2009 – its first full year on sale, outselling its direct competitor the Ford Mondeo, but just falling short of the sales achieved by the more upmarket BMW 3 Series.

At the beginning several trim levels were available, depending on the market: Essentia, Edition, Sport, Cosmo, OPC. Later on others were added, such as the Business edition, Selection, Active, 150 years of Opel, and Innovation.

By August 2011, over 400,000 Insignias had been sold, and on 26 April 2012, the 500,000th Insignia was produced. The last vehicle rolled off the line in April 2017, in time for the release of the Insignia II.

=== Safety ===
ANCAP test results* Opel Insignia all variants (2012)
Test	Score
Overall	5 /5 stars
Frontal offset	15.16/16
Side impact	16/16
Pole	2/2
Seat belt reminders	2/3
Whiplash protection	Good
Pedestrian protection	Marginal
Electronic stability control	Standard

== Second generation (Z18; 2017) ==
Opel Insignia B
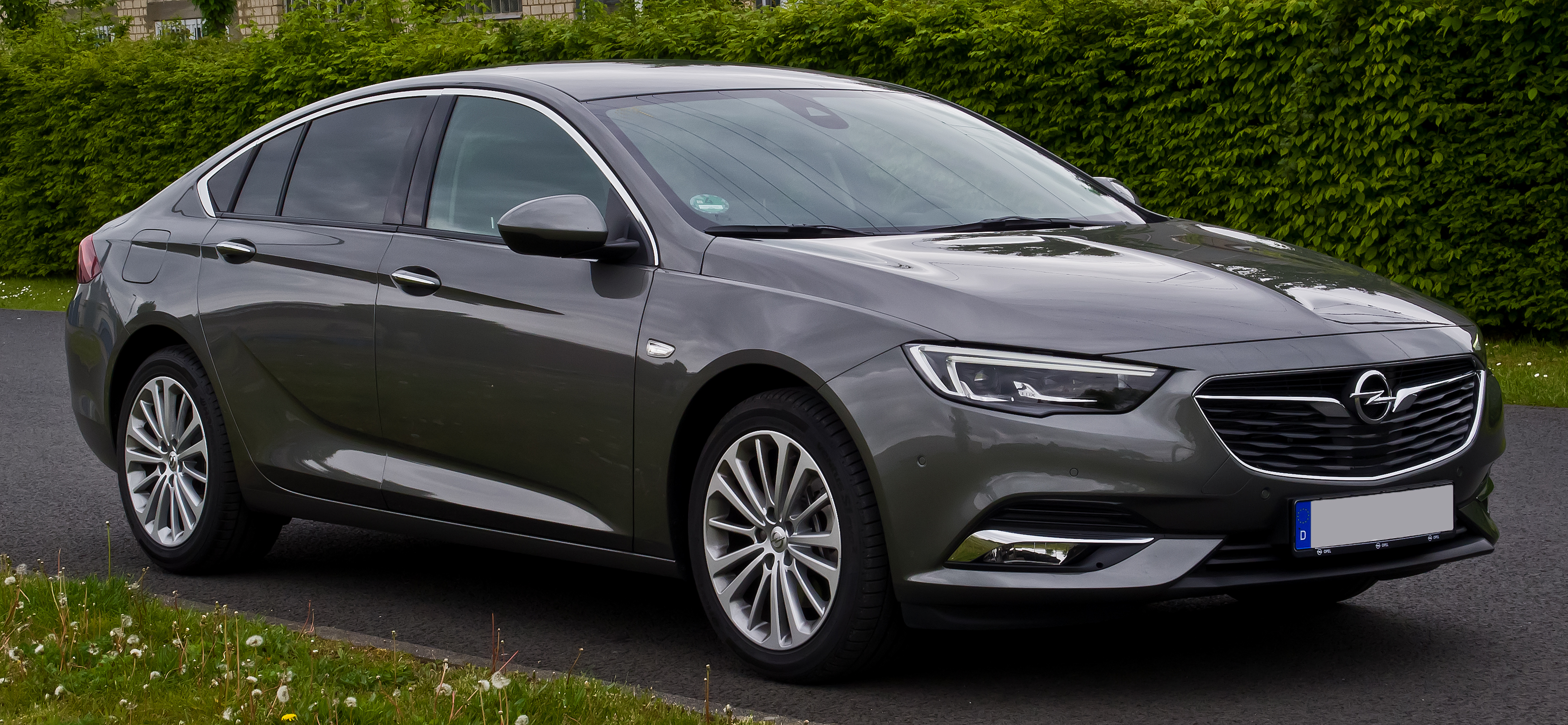

Overview
- Model code: Z18
- Also called: Vauxhall Insignia (United Kingdom); Buick Regal (North America and China); Holden Commodore (ZB) (Australia and New Zealand)
- Production: 2017–present (China); 2017–2022 (other markets)
- Model years: 2018–2020 (North America & Oceania)
- Assembly: Germany: Rüsselsheim; China: Shanghai (SAIC-GM)
- Designer: Niels Loeb

Body and chassis
- Body style: 5-door liftback/fastback; 5-door estate
- Platform: E2XX platform
- Related: Chevrolet Malibu; Cadillac XT4

Powertrain
- Engine: Petrol: 1.5 L EcoTec turbo I4; 1.5 L EcoTec turbo I4; 2.0 L EcoTec turbo I4; 3.6 L LGX V6; Diesel: 1.5 L F15DVH turbo I3; 1.6 L CDTI turbo I4; 2.0 L D20DTH/DTR turbo I4; 2.0 L F20DVH turbo I4
- Transmission: 6-speed manual; 6-speed automatic; 8-speed automatic; 9-speed GM 9T50 automatic (Insignia Grandsport)

Dimensions
- Wheelbase: 2,829 mm (111.4 in)
- Length: 4,897 mm (192.8 in); 4,986 mm (196.3 in) (wagon)
- Width: 1,864 mm (73.4 in)
- Height: 1,455 mm (57.3 in)
- Curb weight: 1,440–1,649 kg (3,175–3,635 lb)

First leaked to the public in December 2016, the Insignia had its public debut during the 2017 Geneva Motor Show in March 2017 held in Geneva. The design took cues from the 2013 Opel Monza Concept. From this point, the traditional four-door notchback saloon version was officially removed from the lineup. The vehicle was officially revealed on 26 June 2017.

The car is based on a moderately updated version of Epsilon II platform and was wholly developed by General Motors. After the sale of Opel to PSA Group, later Stellantis, it is continued to be produced under license.

Opel dropped the OPC designation for its performance Insignia, instead reverting to their older GSi nameplate, last seen on the second generation Opel Vectra. The GSi nameplate also replaces VXR, on the Vauxhall version of the Insignia. This version of the Insignia is badged as the Holden Commodore (ZB) in Australia and New Zealand, and as the sixth generation Buick Regal in the Americas and Asia.

After a 2020 facelift, only the 2-liter four-cylinder petrol engine remained available in Europe, while a new 1.5-liter three-cylinder and a 2.0-liter four cylinder diesel replaced the earlier 1.6 and 2.0.

In 2022, Vauxhall discontinued the Insignia from their model range as the result of the brand would moving towards a fully electric lineup and the decline of the D-segment in Europe which also lead to the discontinuation of the Ford Mondeo and the saloon version of the Volkswagen Passat.

Opel also ended production of the Opel Insignia in 2022. PSA later reversed course and said that the Insignia nameplate will be resurrected as a crossover SUV in 2024 for both Opel and Vauxhall brands; though this never came to fruition.

Under Stellantis' corporate umbrella, the Citroën C5 X and the DS 9 now cover the D/E segments in Europe.

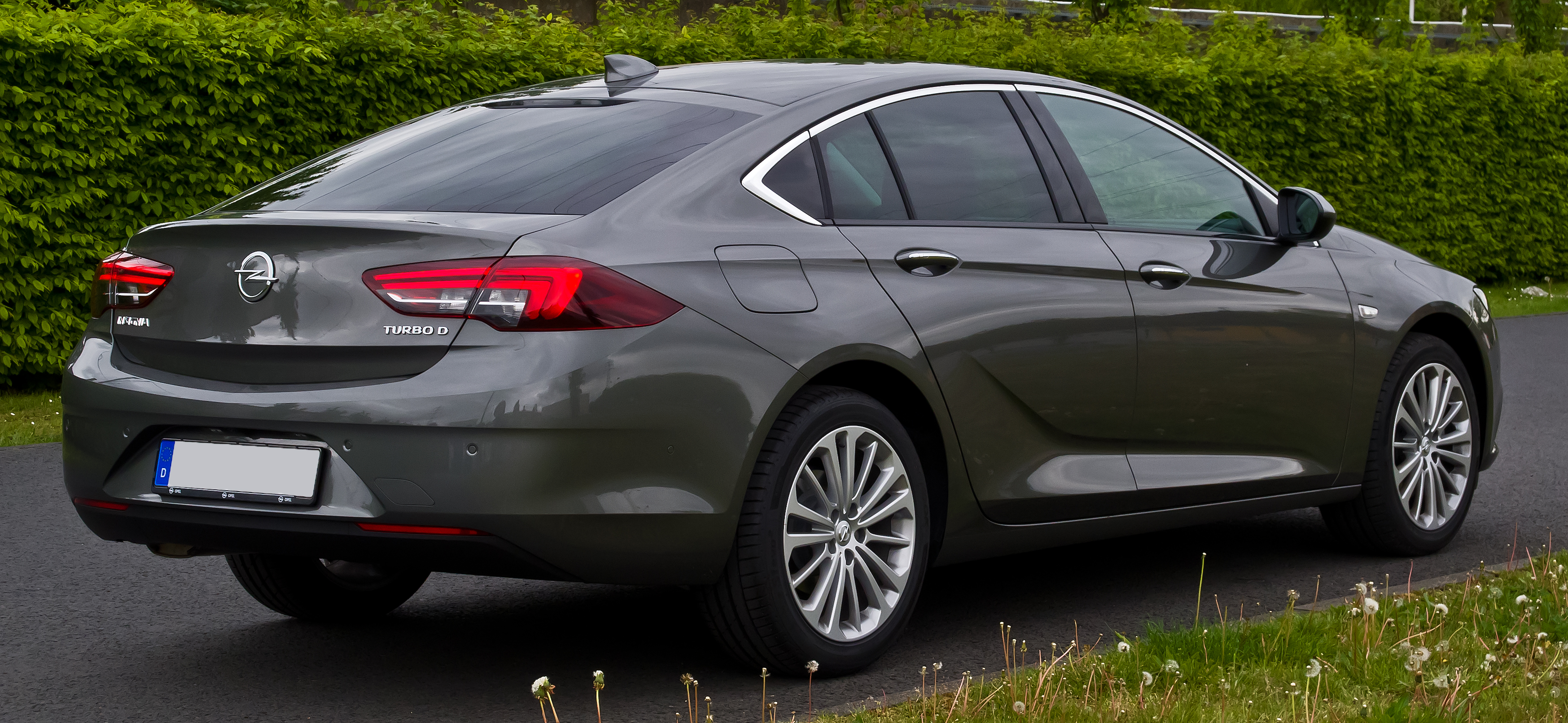
Grand Sport

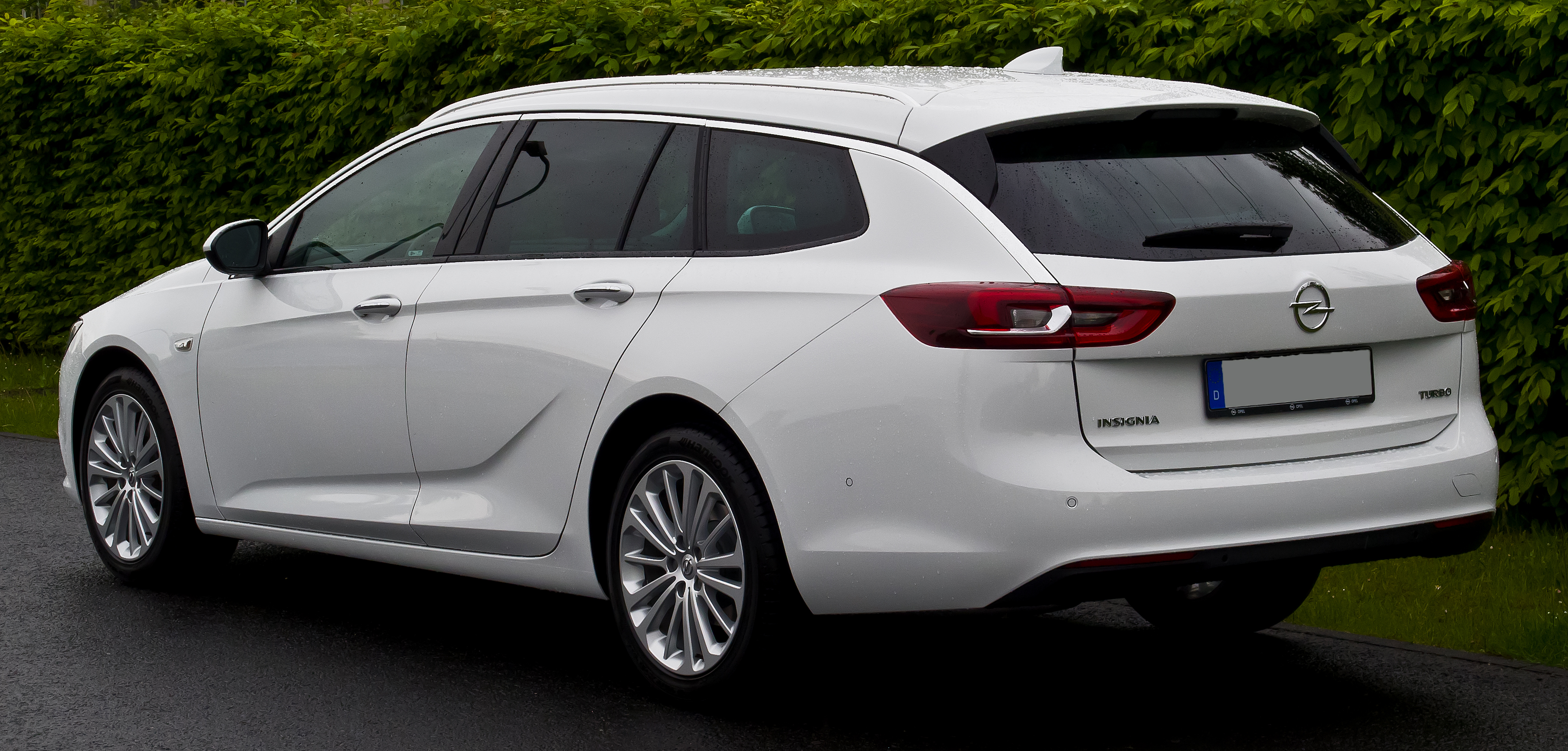
Sports Tourer

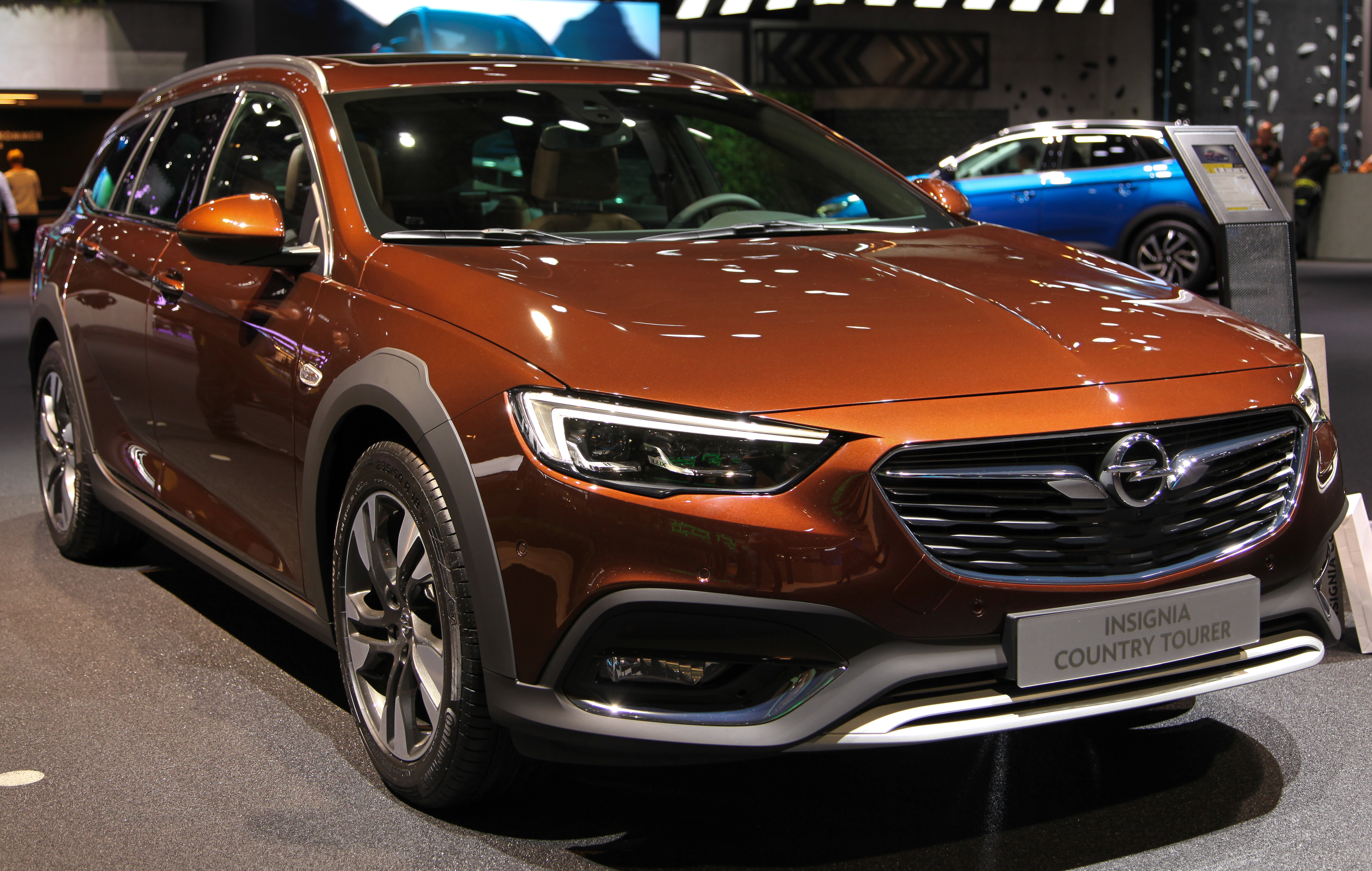
Country Tourer (pre-facelift)

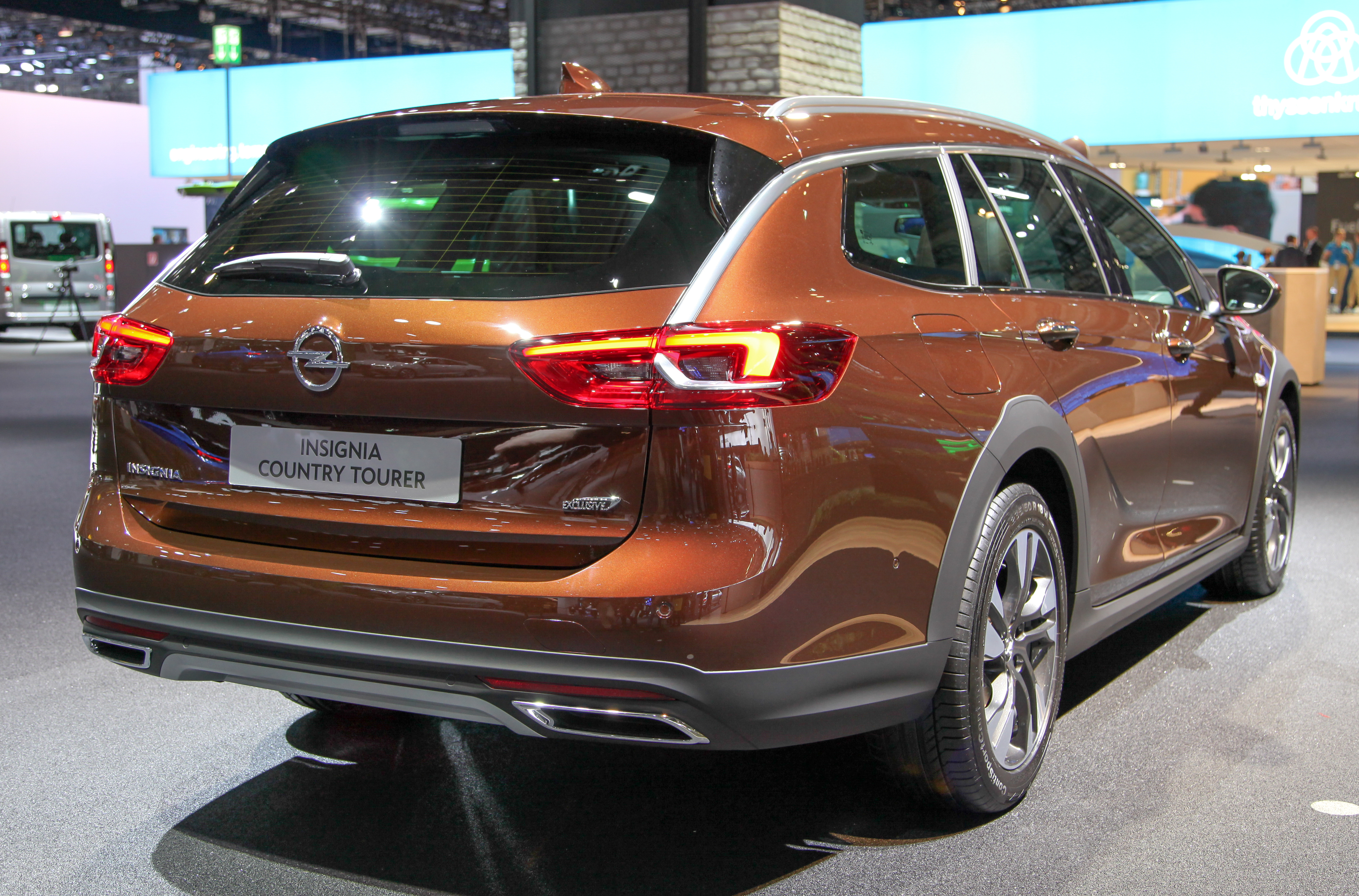
Country Tourer (pre-facelift)

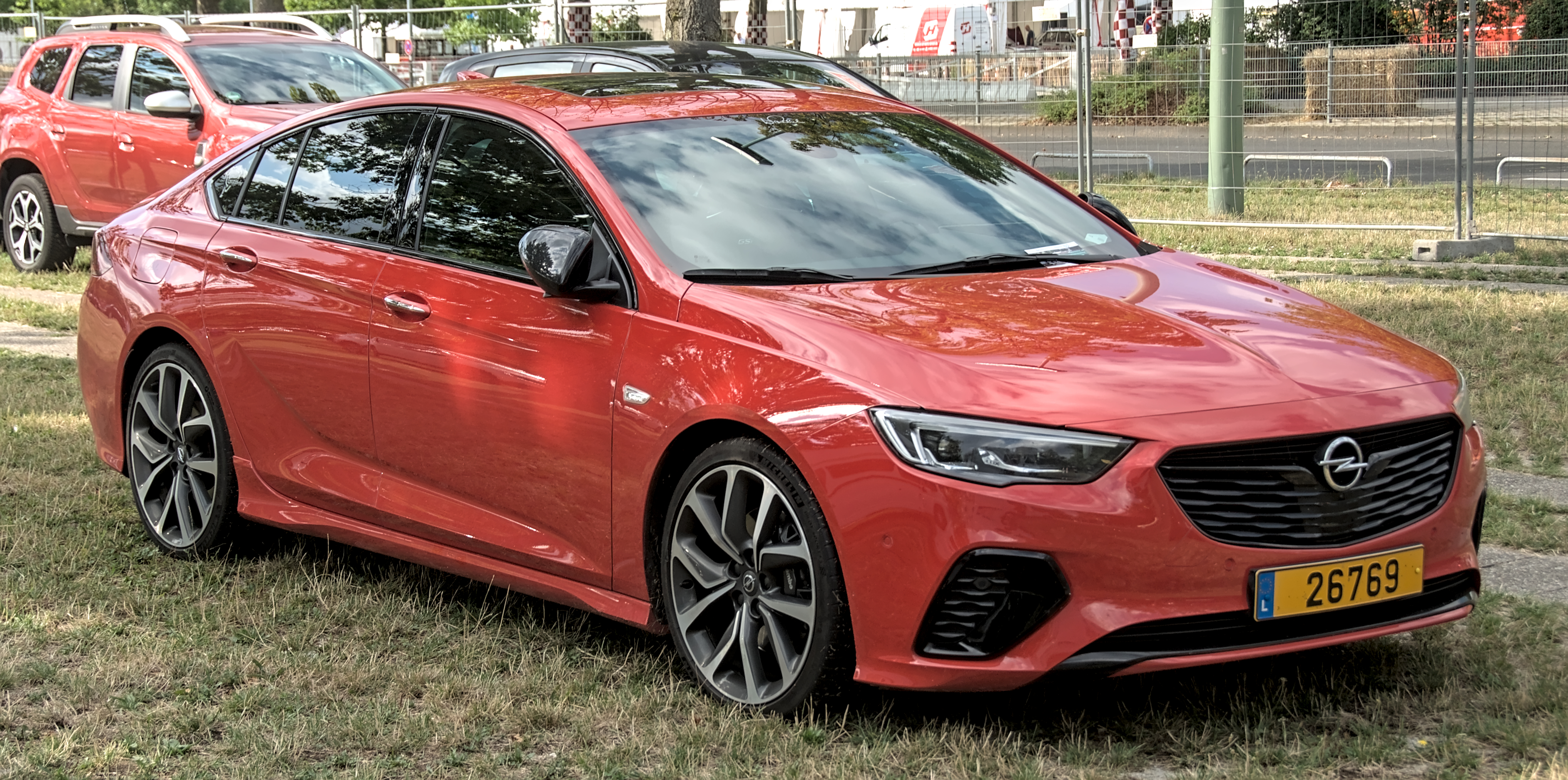
Opel Insignia GSi (pre-facelift)

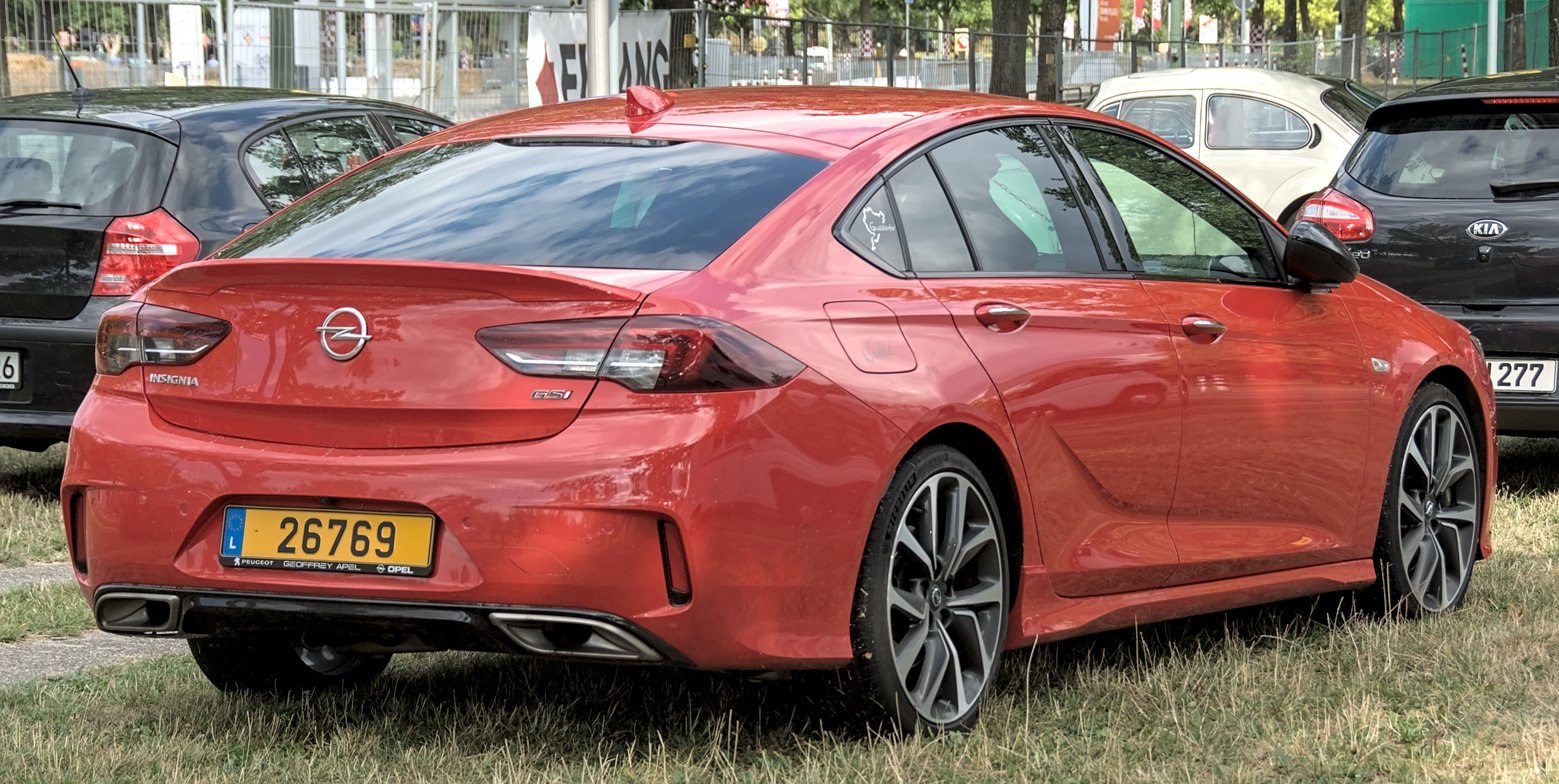
Opel Insignia GSi (pre-facelift)

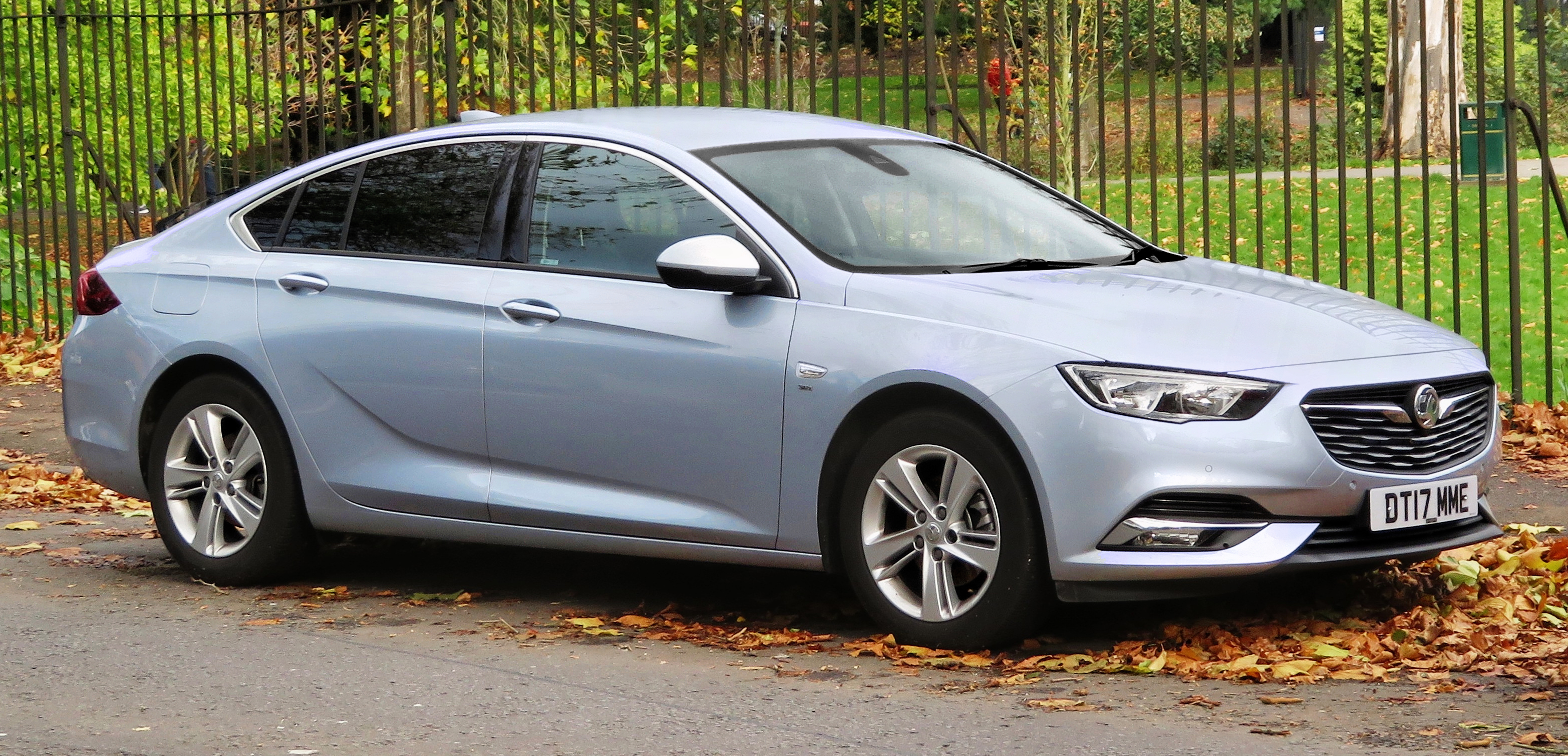
Vauxhall Insignia

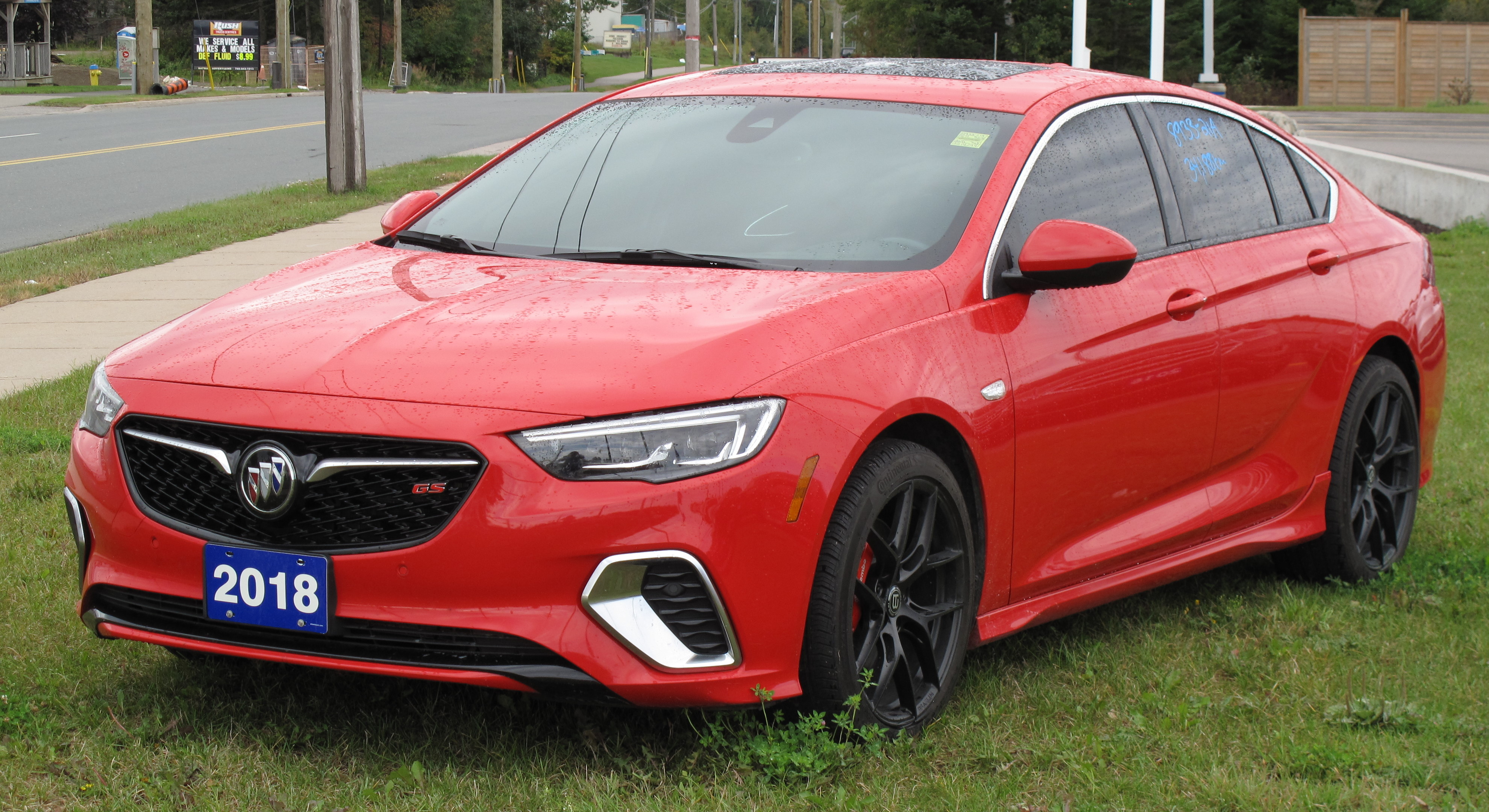
Buick Regal GS

=== Facelift (2020) ===
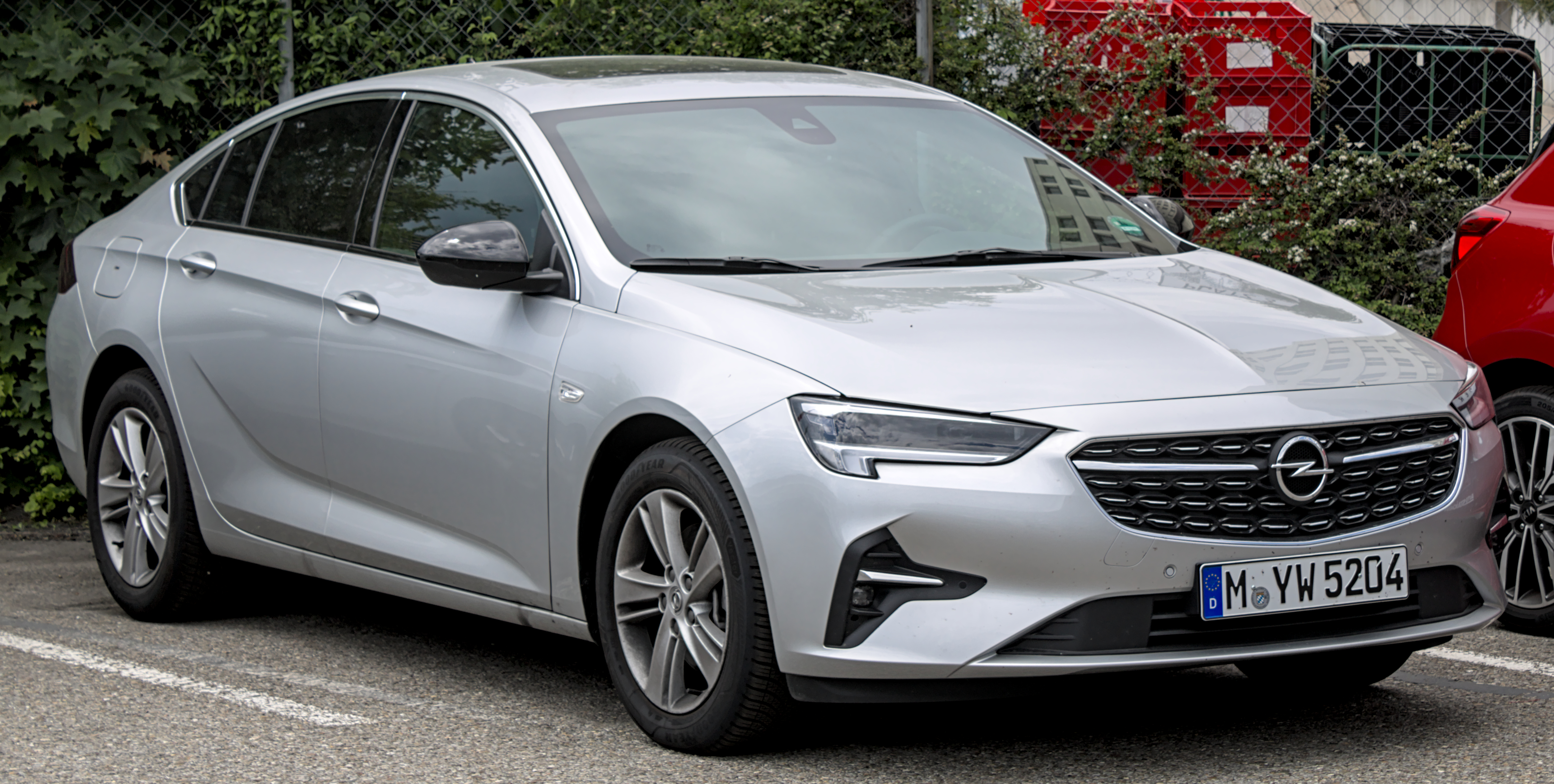
Opel Insignia (facelift)

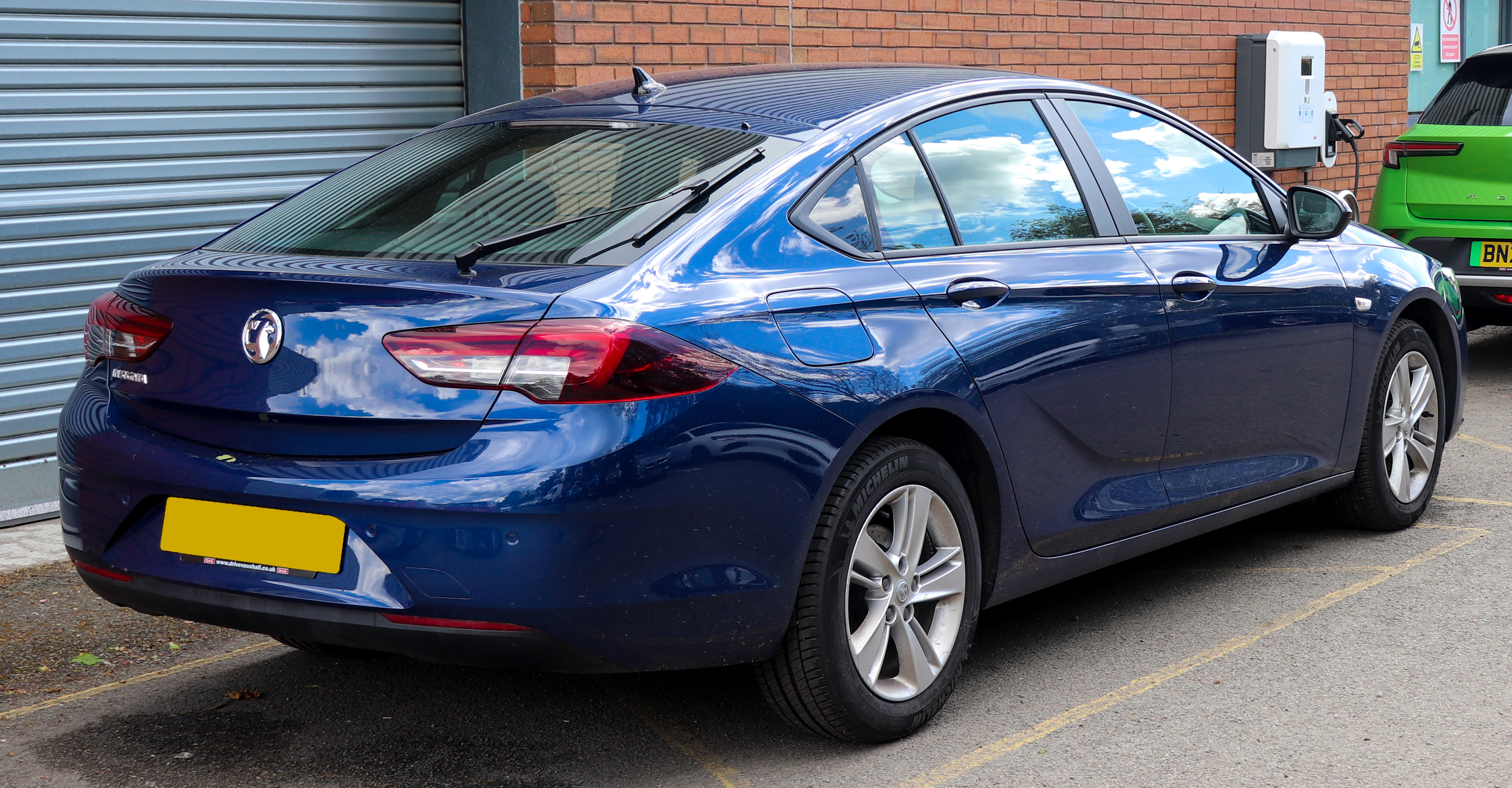
Vauxhall Insignia (facelift)

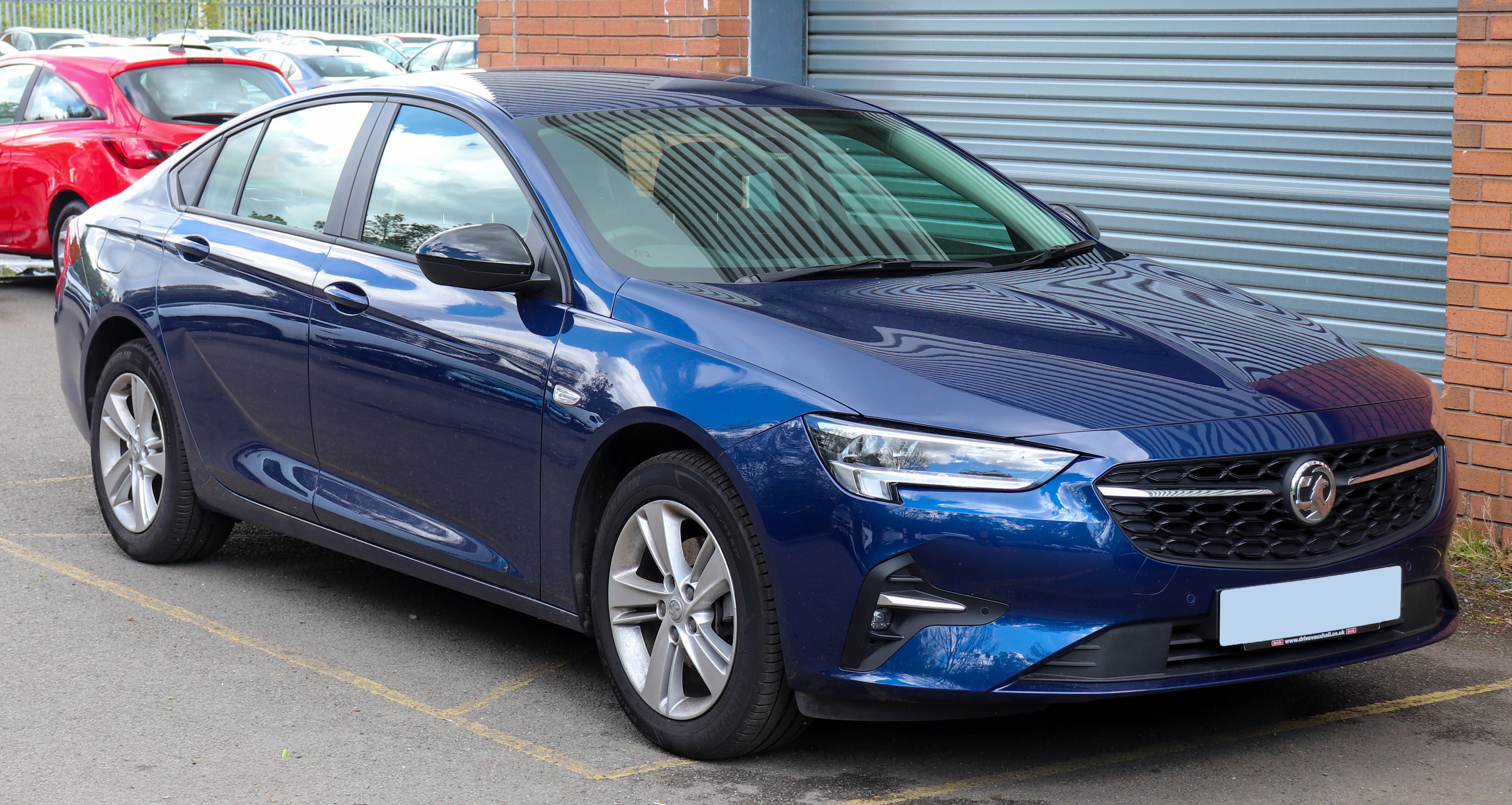
Vauxhall Insignia (facelift)

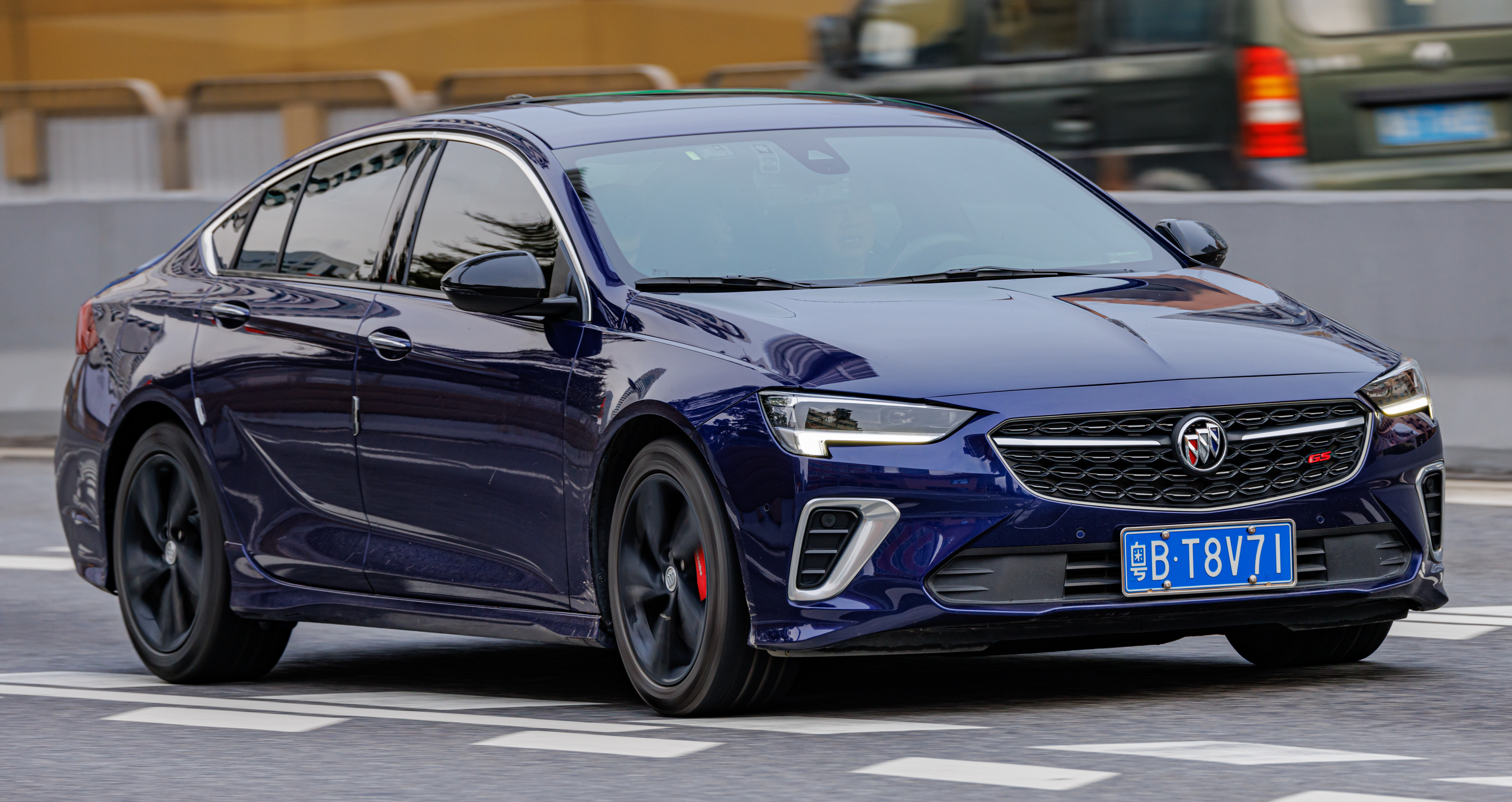
Buick Regal GS (facelift)

=== Engines ===
Petrol engines
Model	Engine	Displacement	Power	Torque	Note(s)	CO_{2} (g/km)	Year(s)
1.5 EcoTec Turbo	I4	1,490 cc	140 PS (103 kW; 138 hp) at 5,600 rpm	250 N⋅m (184 lb⋅ft) at 2,000-4,500 rpm		133	2017–
1.5 EcoTec Turbo	I4	1,490 cc	165 PS (121 kW; 163 hp) at 5,600 rpm	250 N⋅m (184 lb⋅ft) at 2,000–4,500 rpm		136	2017–
2.0 EcoTec Turbo	I4	1,998 cc	260 PS (191 kW; 256 hp) at 5,300 rpm	400 N⋅m (295 lb⋅ft) at 2,500–4,000 rpm	Holden Commodores only boast 350Nm, in order to ensure V6 remains flagship engine	197	2017–
3.6 SIDI LGX	V6	3,564 cc	320 PS (235 kW; 316 hp) at 6,800 rpm	381 N⋅m (281 lb⋅ft) at 5,200 rpm	Available only on Holden Commodore (all versions) and Buick Regal GS	215	2018–
Diesel engines
Model	Engine	Displacement	Power	Torque	Note(s)	CO_{2} (g/km)	Year(s)
1.5 CDTI S/S	I3	1,496 cc	122 PS (90 kW; 120 hp) at 3,500 rpm	300 N⋅m (221 lb⋅ft) at 1,750-2,000 rpm		105	2020–
1.6 CDTI S/S	I4	1,598 cc	110 PS (81 kW; 108 hp) at 3,500 rpm	300 N⋅m (221 lb⋅ft) at 1,750-2,000 rpm		105	2017–
1.6 CDTI S/S	I4	1,598 cc	136 PS (100 kW; 134 hp) at 3,500-4,000 rpm	320 N⋅m (236 lb⋅ft) at 2,000-2,250 rpm		114	2017–
2.0 CDTI S/S	I4	1,956 cc	170 PS (125 kW; 168 hp) at 3,750 rpm	400 N⋅m (295 lb⋅ft) at 1,750–2,500 rpm		136	2017–
2.0 CDTI BiTurbo S/S 4x4	I4	1,956 cc	210 PS (154 kW; 207 hp) at 4,000 rpm	480 N⋅m (354 lb⋅ft) at 1,750–2,500 rpm		190	2017–

=== Holden Commodore (ZB) ===
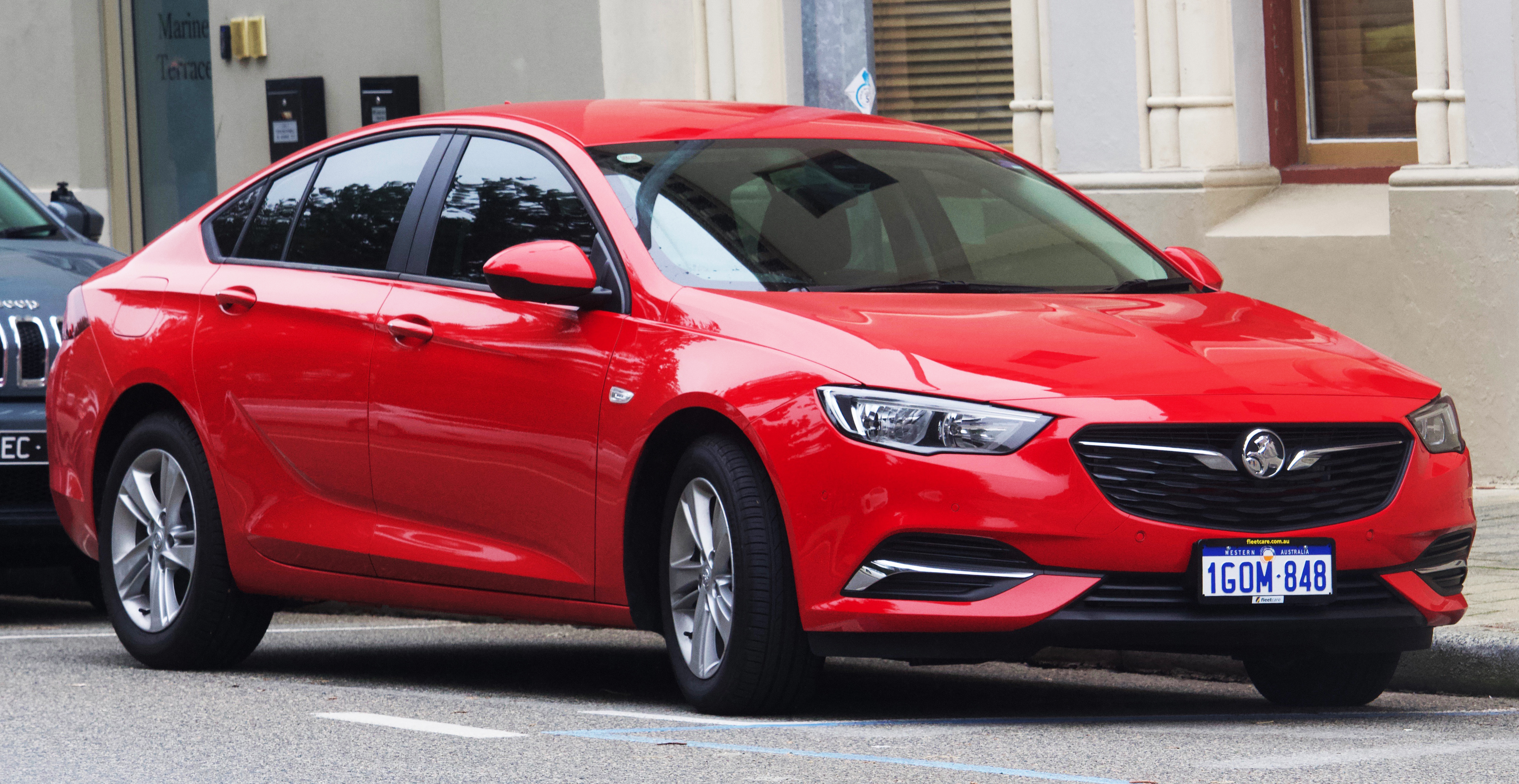
Commodore LT liftback

In 2013 Holden announced the end of local vehicle production in Australia, with the last VF Commodore being built on 20 October 2017. The ZB Commodore was revealed in December 2016, as a re-engineered version of the Opel Insignia with input from Holden.

The ZB Commodore was released 2018. It was available as a liftback sedan and a station wagon, it was powered by a straight-four engine in front-wheel drive, or a V6 engine in all-wheel drive. Unlike previous Commodores, which were rear-wheel drive and available with V8 engines, making it a controversial model on release.

Due to slow sales and Holden's interest in other vehicle segments, it was announced on 10 December 2019 that the ZB Commodore would be discontinued in early 2020, shortly before GM's decision to retire the Holden brand entirely.

=== Buick Regal ===
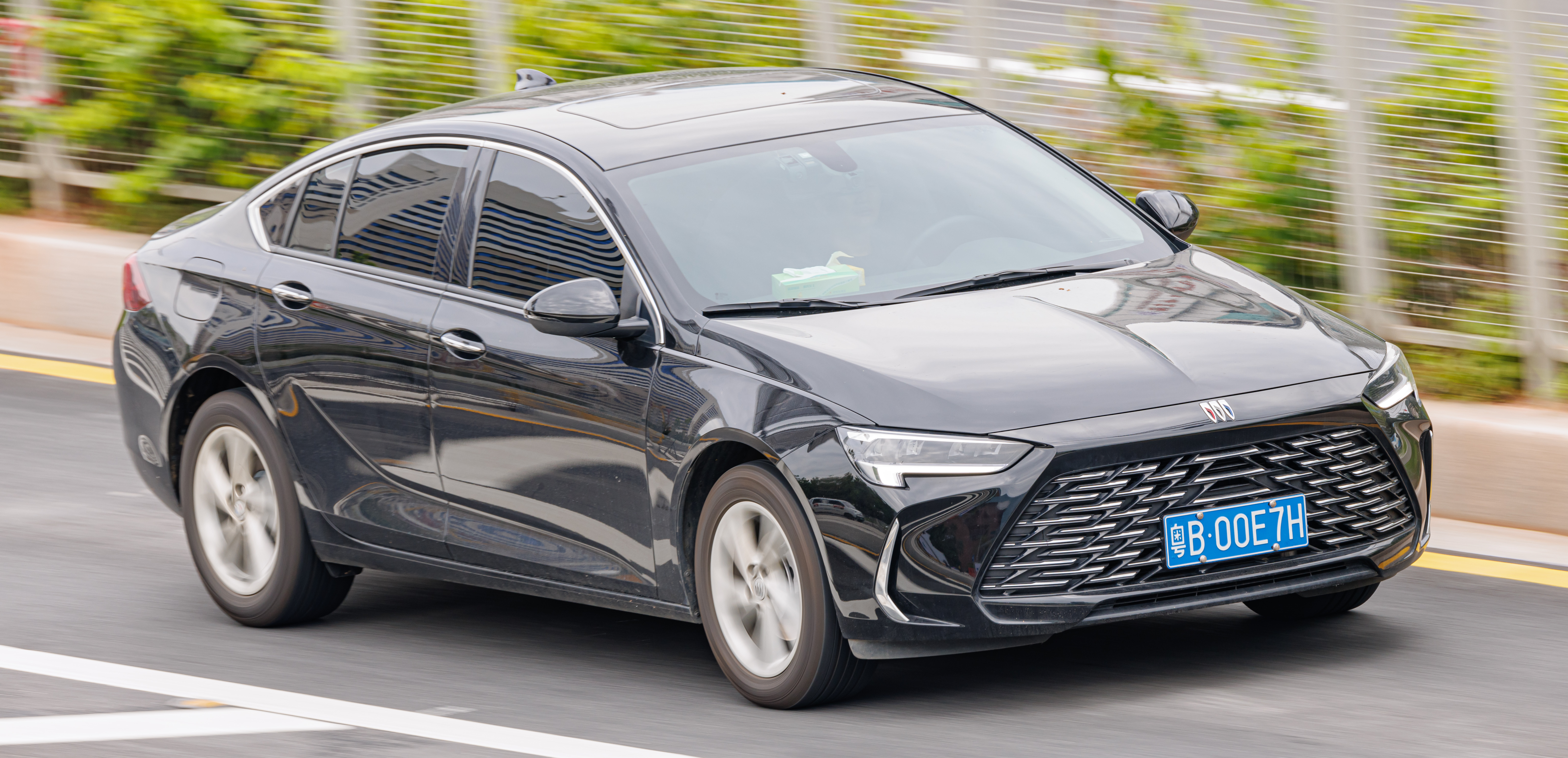
2023 Buick Regal (China; second facelift)

In July 2023, the Buick Regal was facelifted exclusively for the Chinese market, featuring the updated triple shield logo among the changes.

== Motorsport ==
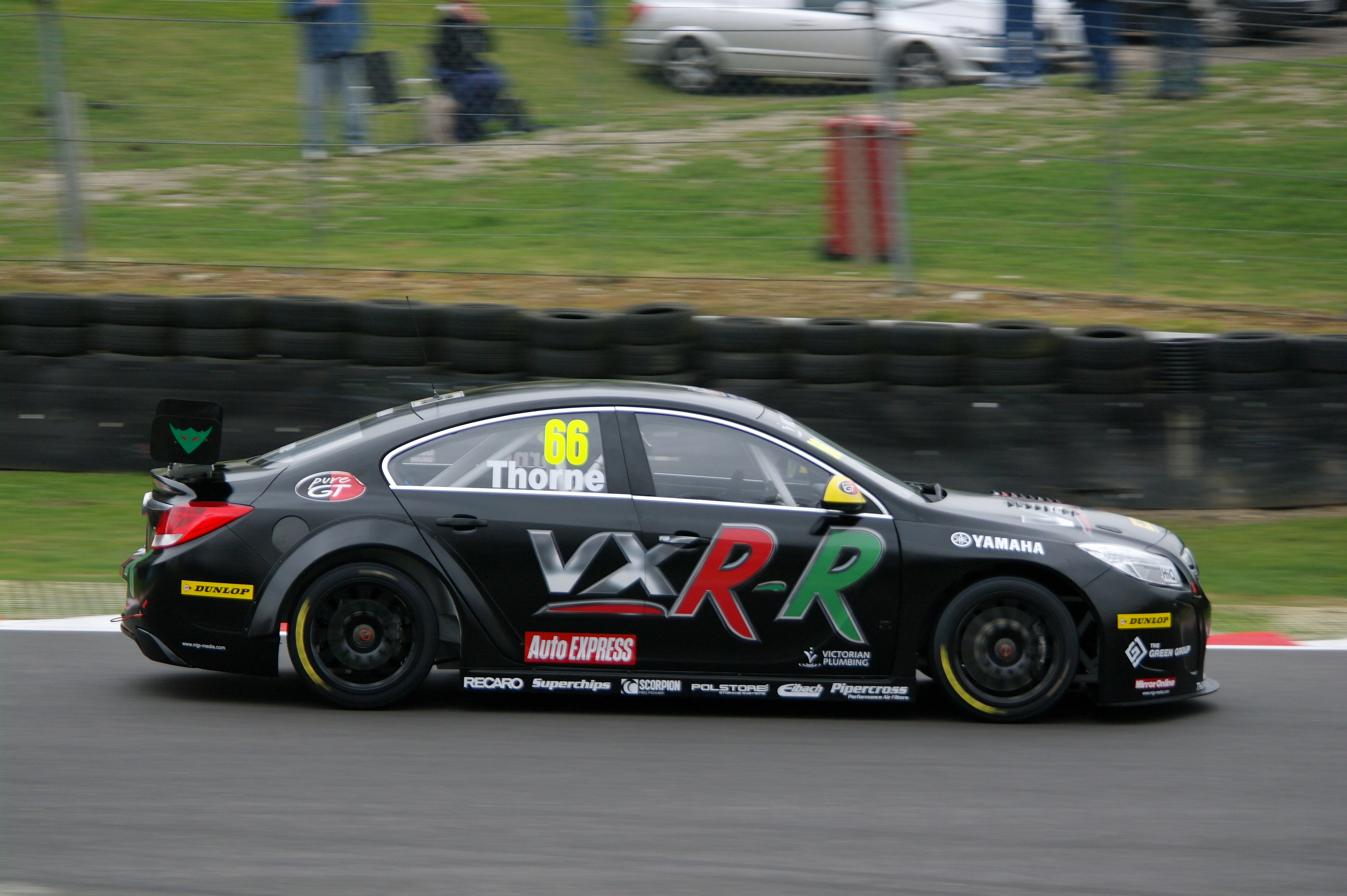
The Vauxhall Insignia VXR-R of John Thorne competing in the 2012 British Touring Car Championship

The Thorney Motorsport team first ran a Vauxhall Insignia VXR in the last round of the 2011 British Touring Car Championship to prepare a two car team for the season of 2012.

Only one car was run in four rounds – 1 and 2 driven by John Thorne, and 6 and 9 driven by Tony Gilham. Tony's Team HARD bought the two Insignias from Thorney Motorsport, and raced one of them himself in the last round of the 2012 season.

Driving both cars for the season of 2013 were James Cole and Jack Goff, running under the RCIB Insurance Racing team name. RCIB Insurance Racing/Team Hard sold the cars to BMR for the 2014 BTCC season, and would be driven by Jack Goff and Warren Scott. The Insignia was not as competitive as hoped and the cars were replaced mid season with Volkswagen CCs.

== Other rebranding ==
In Chile, the Insignia was introduced in 2008 as the Chevrolet Vectra. In 2013, the model line dropped its Chevrolet name, adopting the Opel Insignia nameplate.

In August 2012, the Opel Insignia was introduced to Australia; following the 2013 withdrawal of Opel from Australia by GM, the model line was dropped from the market. For 2015, the Insignia returned to Australia (and for the first time, New Zealand) under the Holden marque, slotted slightly under the Commodore range in market position.

== 2003 Insignia concept ==
2003 Insignia Concept
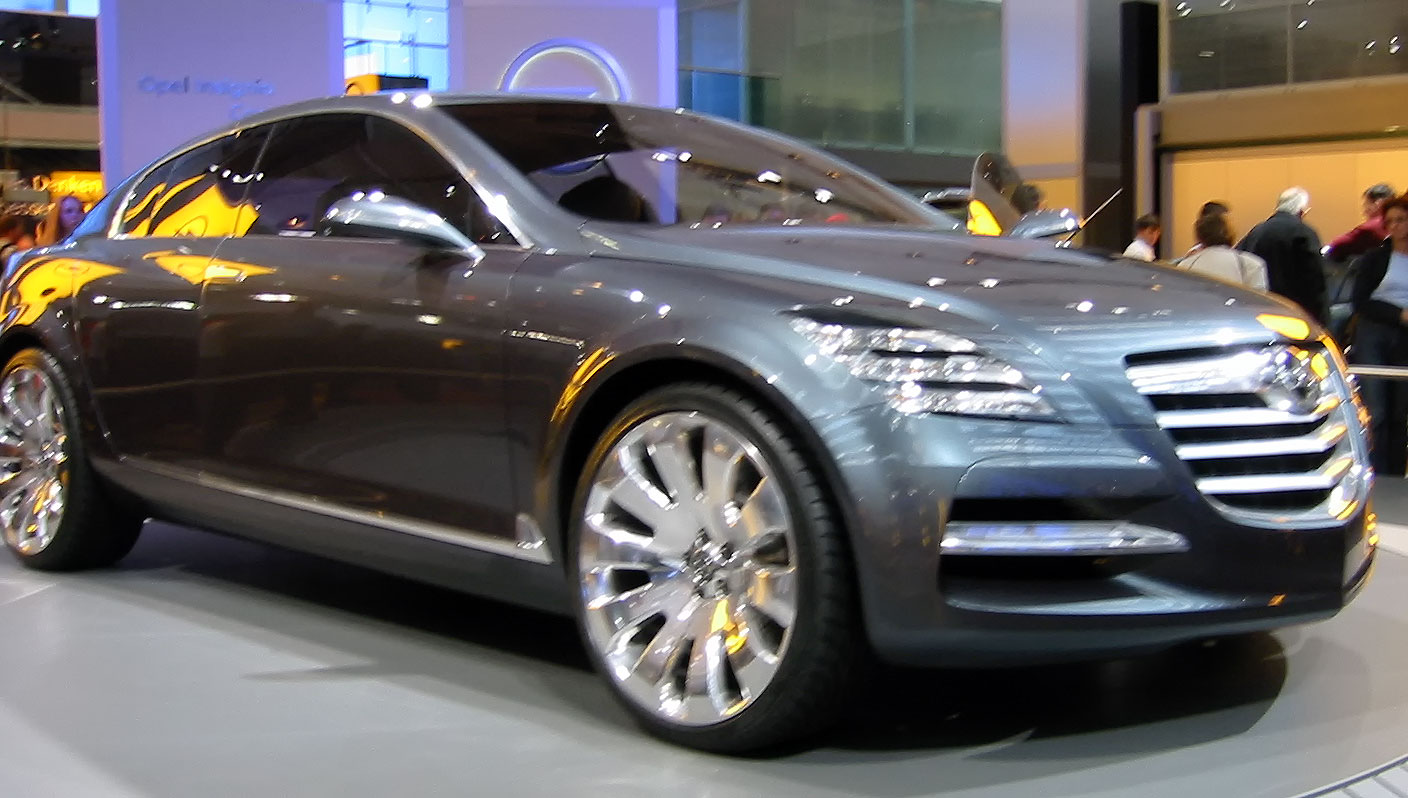

Overview
- Manufacturer: Opel
- Production: 2003 (Concept car)
- Designer: Mark Adams; Malcolm Ward

Body and chassis
- Class: Luxury car
- Body style: 5-door liftback/fastback
- Layout: FR layout
- Platform: GM V platform

Powertrain
- Engine: 5.7 L LS1 V8
- Transmission: 7-speed automatic

Dimensions
- Wheelbase: 2,915 mm (114.8 in)
- Length: 4,803 mm (189.1 in)
- Width: 1,914 mm (75.4 in)
- Height: 1,414 mm (55.7 in)

Chronology
- Successor: Buick Avenir

The Opel Insignia nameplate saw its first use on a 2003 concept car. For the 2003 Frankfurt Motor Show, Opel debuted a concept car previewing a potential mid-2000s full-size luxury car (F-segment) for the brand.

Derived from the rear-wheel drive GM V platform used by the VY Holden Commodore and Statesman, the Opel Insignia concept vehicle was styled as a fastback 5-door liftback. The engine was sourced from the Chevrolet Corvette C5, pairing a 344 hp LS1 V8 with an all-new 7-speed automatic transmission.

The Insignia debuted several notable features, including a reconfigurable rear seat (changing between 5-passenger seating and a 2+2 layout with a rear center console), LED headlamps (powered by 405 LEDs), a reconfigurable dashboard and center console (with air-conditioned storage and humidor). The rear sliding doors were fitted with pantographic hinges, allowing for the deletion of external guide rails.

Intended primarily as a debut of the design language of the Opel brand for the mid-2000s, the Insignia was not officially intended for production. In the beginning of 2005, Opel stated that it would not build a production version of the vehicle, claiming it would be too heavy and expensive. Elements of the Insignia concept design were eventually adopted by other GM vehicles, including the 2015 Buick Avenir concept (sharing a similar fastback/4-door coupe configuration) and the 2008–2017 Opel Insignia/Buick Regal (rear fascia) and the 2010–2016 Buick LaCrosse (roofline); its liftback configuration was adopted by the 2018 Insignia/Regal/Commodore.

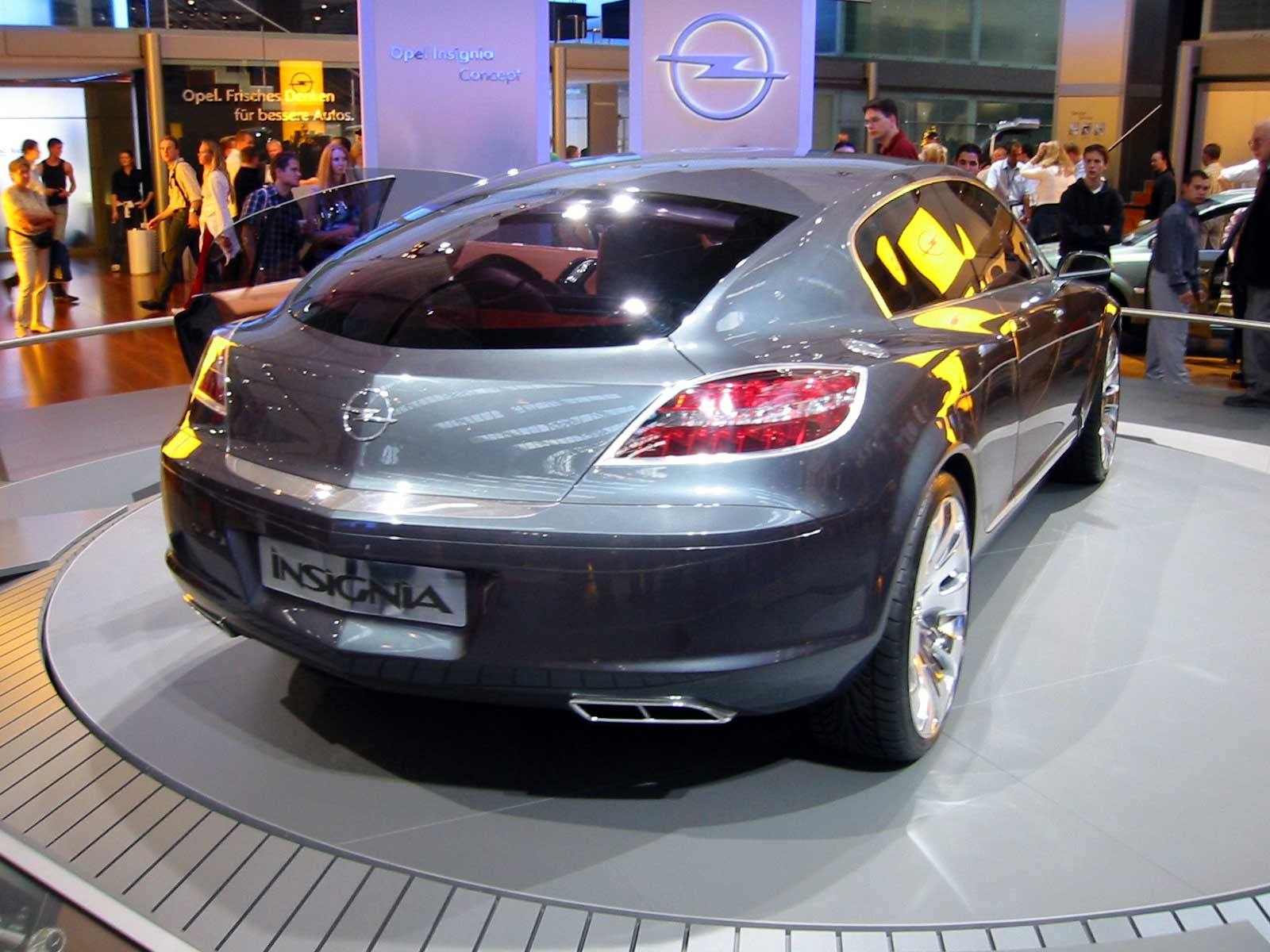
Opel Insignia Concept at the 2003 Frankfurt Motor Show

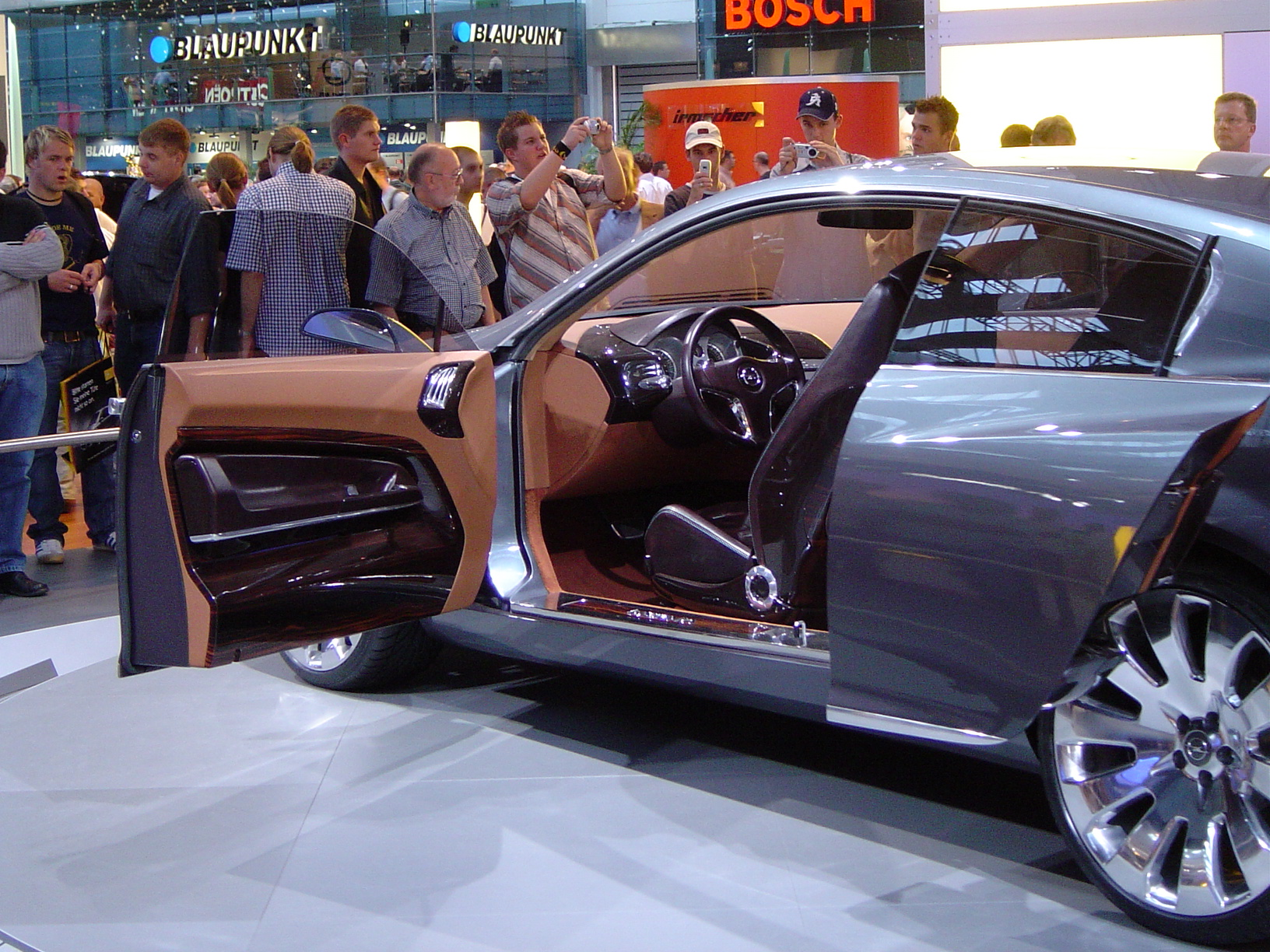
Rear sliding doors

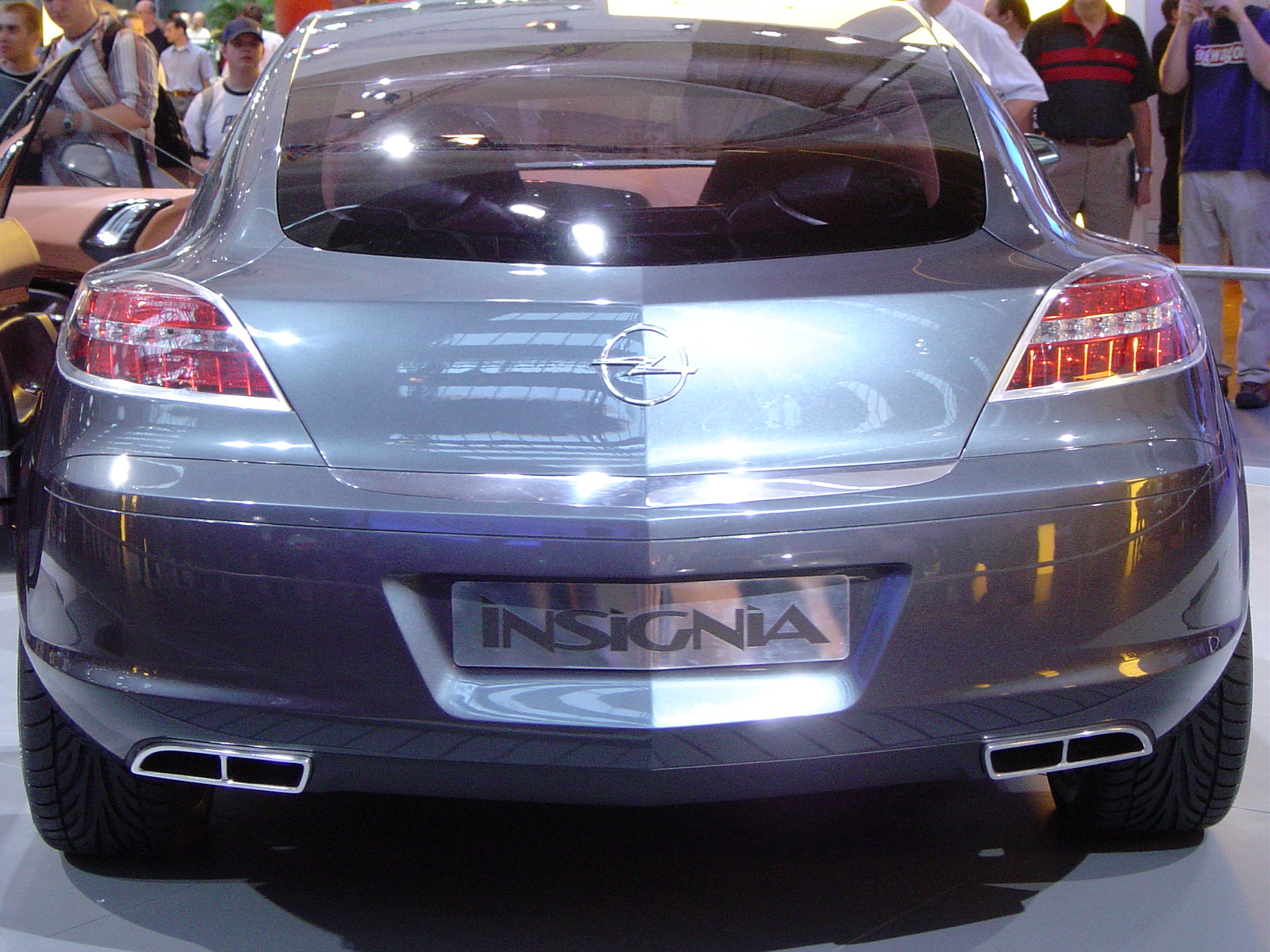
Rear view
