= RX8 =

RX8 may refer to:

- Mazda RX-8, a sports car, made by Mazda
- Roewe RX8, an SUV by Roewe
