= Opel Manufacturing Poland =

Automobile factory in Poland

- Formerly: General Motors Manufacturing Poland
- Type: Subsidiary
- Industry: Automobile
- Founder: General Motors
- Headquarters: Gliwice, Silesian Voivodeship, Poland
- Number of locations: 2
- Products: Light commercial vehicles, engines
- Brands: Opel, Vauxhall
- Revenue: 1,278,000,000 euro (2018)
- Net income: 16,000,000 euro (2018)
- Owner: Stellantis
- Number of employees: 2,853 (2018)
- Parent: Opel
- Website: www.opel.pl

Opel Manufacturing Poland Sp. z o.o. (formerly General Motors Manufacturing Poland Sp. z o.o.) is an automobile manufacturer in Poland. It assembles light commercial vehicles in a factory in Gliwice and builds engines in Tychy. Opel Manufacturing Poland is a subsidiary of Opel Automobile GmbH in Rüsselsheim, Germany which in turn is a subsidiary of Stellantis.

This is not to be confused with the Opel sales company Opel Poland Sp. z o.o. with seat in Warsaw, appearing publicly as Opel Polska.

== Car assembly in Gliwice ==
Opel factory Gliwice
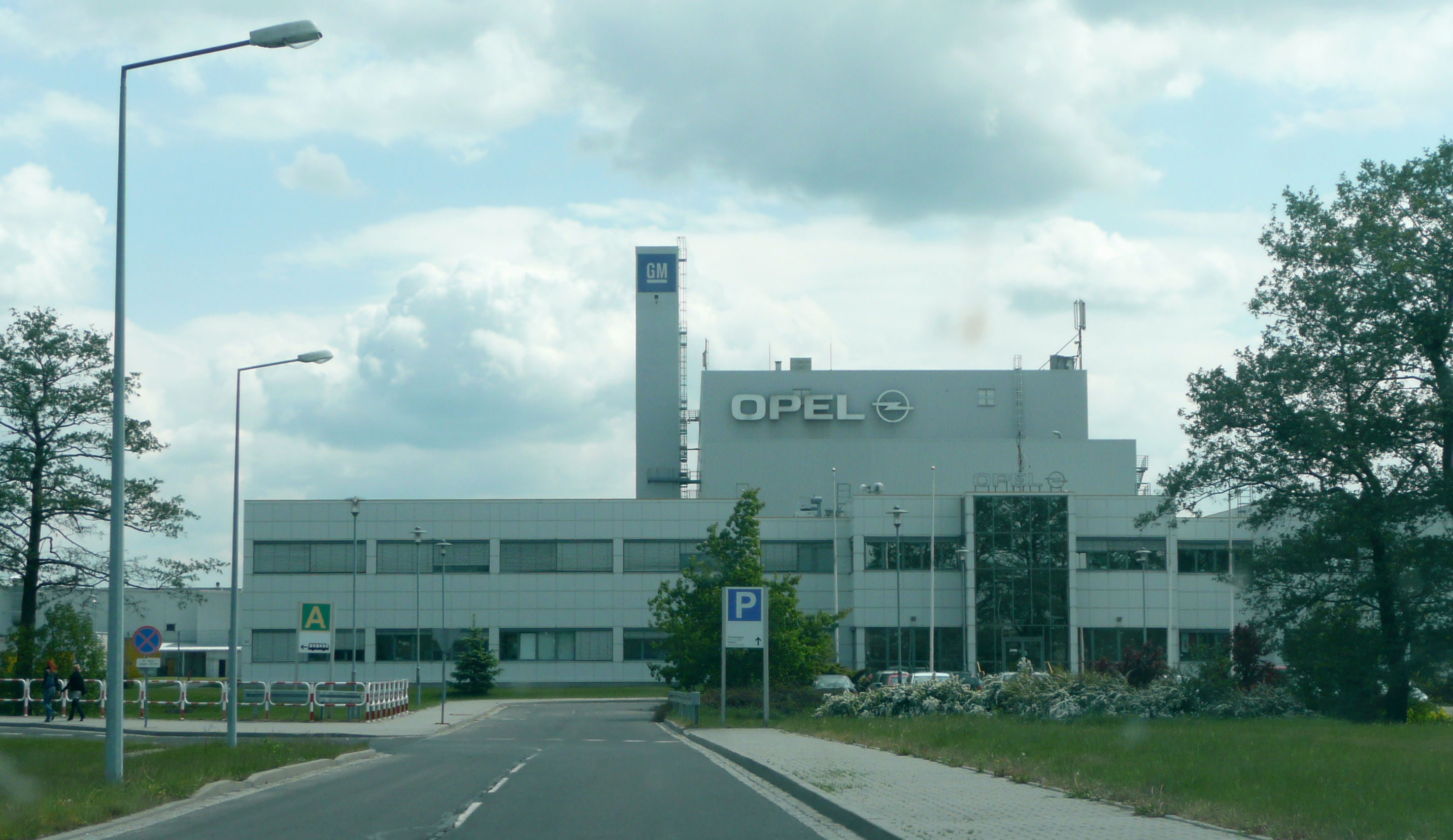
- Gliwice factory

- Location within Silesian Voivodeship
- Location: ul. Adama Opla 1 44-121 Gliwice
- Coordinates: 50°19′7.9″N 18°37′19.8″E
- Industry: Automobile
- Products: Passenger cars
- Area: 731,343 square metres (7,872,110 sq ft)

=== Passenger cars ===
The factory in Gliwice built the compact Opel Astra car for the Opel, Vauxhall and Holden brands and the Opel Cascada for the formerly named brands and as Buick for the North American market.

The passenger car assembly ended on the 30 November 2021.

=== Light commercial vehicles ===
As the production of Opel Astra in Gliwice was reported to end on the 30 November 2021, Stellantis also announced to start the production of light commercial vehicles (Opel/Vauxhall Movano, Peugeot Boxer, Fiat Ducato, Citroën Jumper and Toyota Proace Max) in April 2022 in the new factory next to the old one.

== Engine factory in Tychy ==
Opel factory Tychy
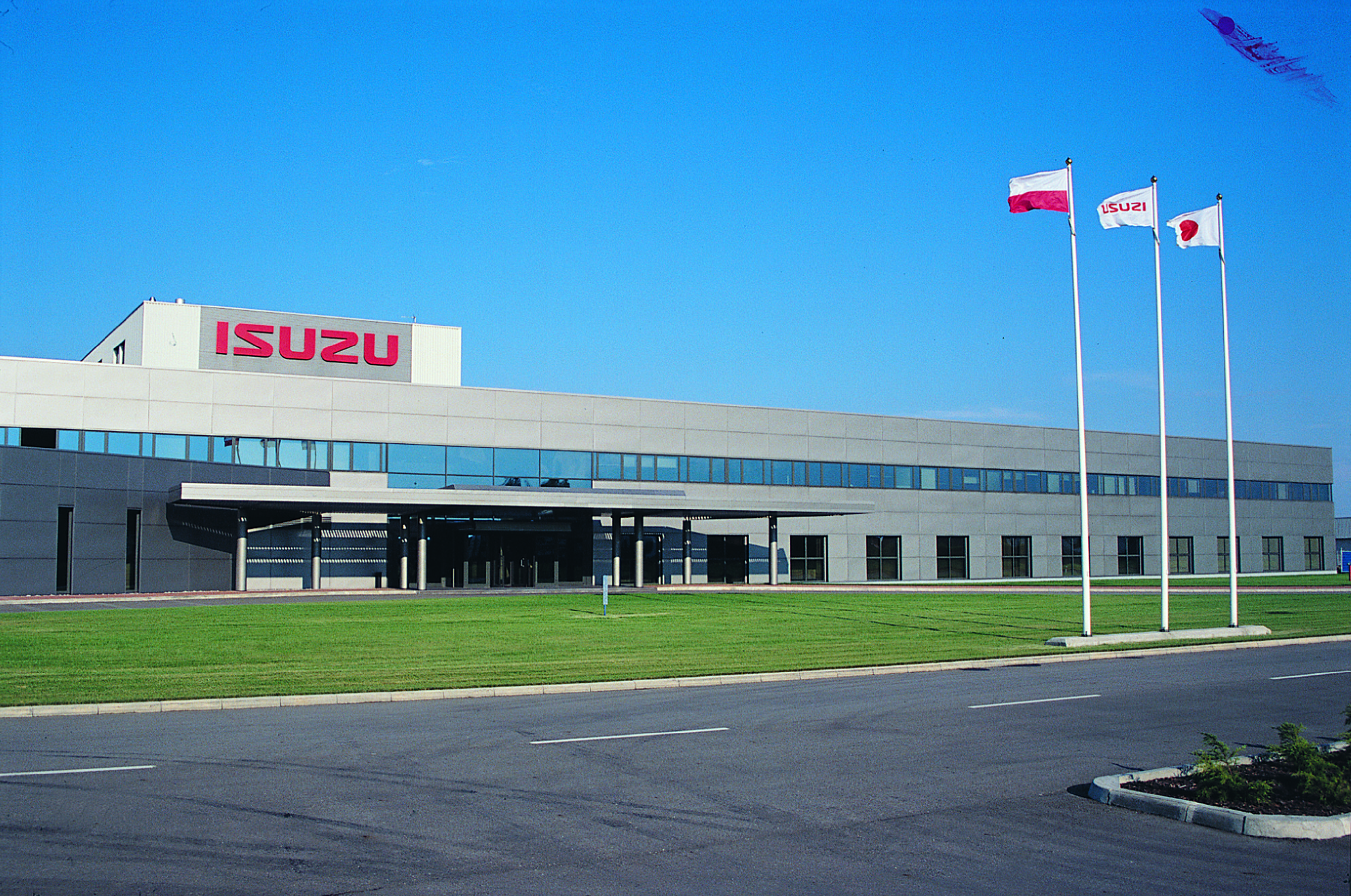
- as the former Isuzu factory

- Location within Silesian Voivodeship
- Built: 1996
- Location: Oddział I ul. Towarowa 50, 43-100 Tychy
- Coordinates: 50.1022359°N 19.0310252°E
- Products: automobile engines: Diesel engines, Petrol engines
- Employees: 490 (2016-12-31)
- Area: 350,000 square metres (3,800,000 sq ft)

Formerly GM Powertrain Poland and before that Isuzu Motors Polska Sp. z o.o. or ISPOL was opened in 1996 by Isuzu as a production site for Diesel engines, beginning with the Circle L engine. However, Isuzu's financial troubles caused General Motors to take control with 60% of ISPOL's capital in 2002. Since then the plant manufactured over two million engines for Opel/Vauxhall. The engines are for various Opel/Vauxhall models.

In 2013, General Motors purchased the remaining 40% shares of the Tychy plant from Isuzu Motors Ltd.

In preparation for the sale by GM of the brands Opel and Vauxhall with the whole of the Opel/Vauxhall automobile business in Europe per August 1, 2017, this factory was transferred in the property of Opel Automobile GmbH, which was sold to PSA.

On March 21, 2018, PSA announced that this factory would be retooled to produce 3-cylinder "Puretech" petrol engines to be delivered to PSA's factory in Trnava, Slovakia, saving hundreds of kilometers in transport, and avoiding to build an engine factory at the Trnava site.

== Products ==
=== Current models ===
- Fiat Ducato (2022−present)
- Peugeot Boxer (2022−present)
- Citroën Jumper (2022−present)
- Opel Movano C (2022−present)
- Vauxhall Movano C (2022−present)
- Toyota Proace Max (2024−present)
- Iveco eSuperJolly (2025−present)

=== Past models ===
- Opel Astra F Classic (1998−2002)
- Opel Agila A (2000−2007)
- Opel Astra G Classic (2003−2009)
- Suzuki Wagon R+ (2005−2007)
- Opel Zafira B (2005−2010)
- Opel Astra H Classic (2006−2014)
- Opel Astra J hatchback (2009−2015)
- Opel Astra GTC (2011−2018)
- Opel Astra J sedan (2012−2020)
- Opel Cascada (2013−2019)
- Opel Astra K hatchback (2015−2021)

== See also ==
- FCA Poland

=== regarding Tychy engine factory ===
- GM Powertrain Torino
- Fiat Powertrain Technologies
- Ecotec
- List of GM engines
- Multijet
