= GM Medium Gasoline Engine =

Medium-displacement 4-cylinder gasoline engine

General Motors Medium Gasoline Engine
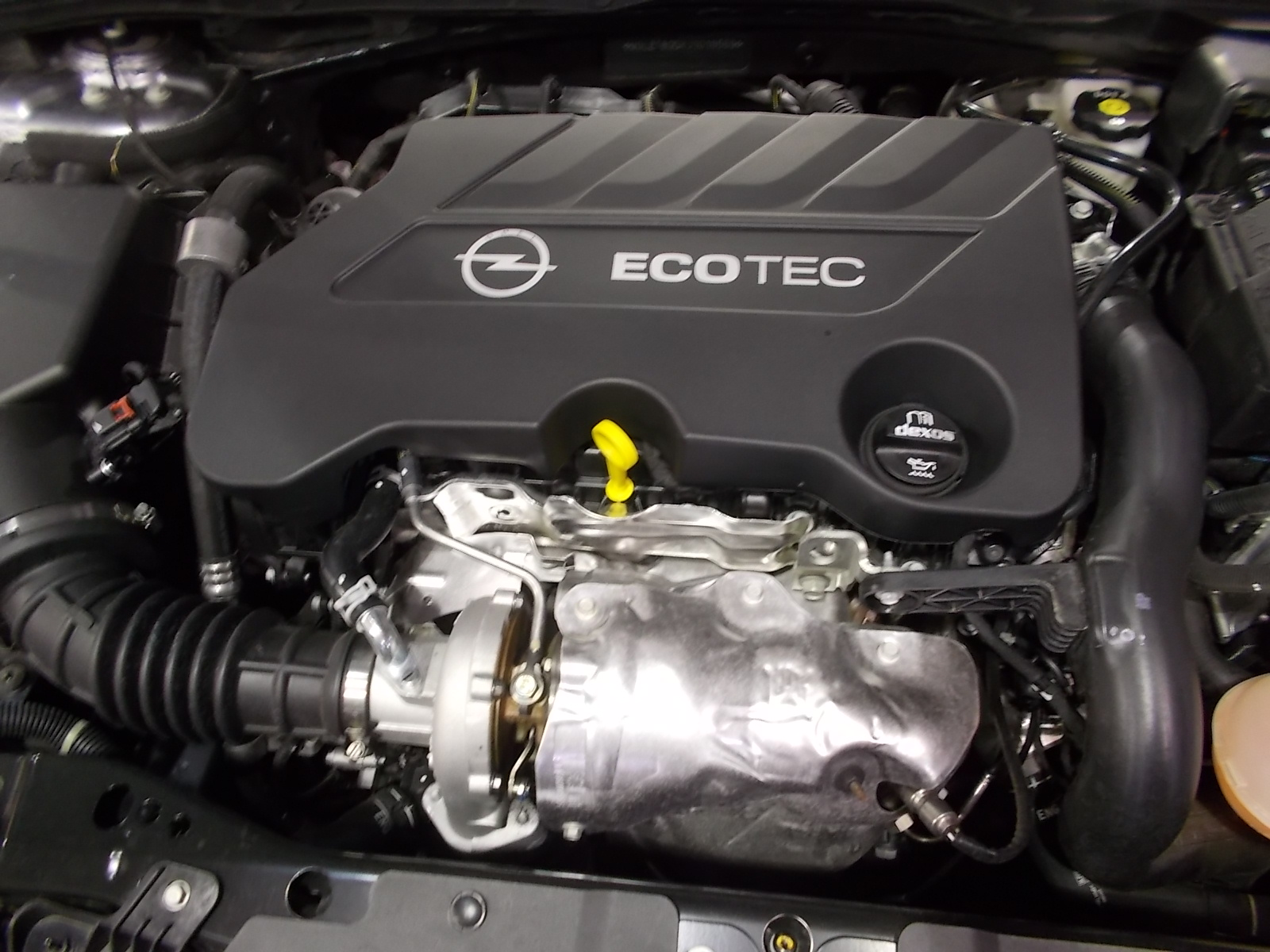
- 1.6 L Ecotec in an Opel

Overview
- Manufacturer: General Motors; SAIC Motor
- Also called: MGE
- Production: 2012–present

Layout
- Configuration: Inline-4
- Displacement: 1,598 cc (97.5 cu in); 1,796 cc (109.6 cu in); 1,995 cc (121.7 cu in)
- Cylinder bore: 79 mm (3.11 in); 80.5 mm (3.17 in); 86 mm (3.4 in)
- Piston stroke: 81.5 mm (3.21 in); 88.2 mm (3.47 in); 86 mm (3.4 in)
- Cylinder block material: Cast iron
- Cylinder head material: Aluminum
- Valvetrain: DOHC
- Compression ratio: 9.5:1; 10:1; 11.5:1

Combustion
- Turbocharger: In 1.6 L and 2.0 L
- Fuel system: SIDI
- Fuel type: Gasoline
- Oil system: Wet sump
- Cooling system: Water-cooled

Output
- Power output: 122–261 PS (90–192 kW; 120–257 hp)
- Torque output: 175–405 N⋅m (129–299 lb⋅ft)

Dimensions
- Length: 583 mm (23.0 in); 638 mm (25.1 in)
- Width: 643 mm (25.3 in); 564 mm (22.2 in)
- Height: 701 mm (27.6 in)
- Dry weight: 109–142 kg (240–313 lb)

Chronology
- Predecessor: Family 1

Medium Gasoline Engine (MGE) is a medium-displacement 4-cylinder gasoline engine developed by Opel Automobile GmbH and marketed as 'SIDI Ecotec'.

== History ==
Production began in late 2012 at Szentgotthárd, Hungary. The engine features Start/Stop and reduces fuel consumption and CO_{2} emissions by 13 percent comparing to the predecessor, while maintaining Euro 6 emissions standards.

A turbocharged Eco variant delivering 170 PS (125 kW; 168 hp) @ 4250 rpm and 260 N⋅m (192 lb⋅ft) @ 1650-4250 rpm (overboost 280 N⋅m (207 lb⋅ft)) has been introduced at 2012 Moscow International Automobile Salon (MIAS); a Performance version with maximum torque 300 N⋅m (221 lb⋅ft) and peak power 200 PS (147 kW; 197 hp) will also be available. Each version features unique turbine aerodynamic, and aggressive boost strategies improve low-end torque.

The high-performance turbocharged 1,995 cc (2.0 L) 20A4E engine with central direct injection has 79 mm × 81.5 mm (3.11 in × 3.21 in) bore and stroke, with cylinder pressure of 130 bar (1,900 psi) and compression ratio of 9.5:1 for Performance version and 10.5:1 for Eco version is developed and manufactured by Chinese Saic Motor company. It uses a grey cast-iron block with die-cast aluminum bedplate, aluminum cylinder head, chain-driven DOHC valvetrain with hydraulic tensioners, dual continuous variable cam phasing, and forged steel crankshaft. The engine has twin balance shafts and specially designed cam cover to improve NVH, while optimized compressor geometry, acoustic resonators and overall air handling help reduce noise by 2 dB. Centrally placed injector allows optimal operation in both stratified and homogeneous charge ignition. Optimized main bearing journal diameter, roller cam followers, and PVD coated piston rings reduce friction.

Starting in 2013, the engine began to replace turbocharged 1.6 L Family I Ecotec engine in Opel cars, and in 2014-2015 it will replace naturally aspirated 1.6 L and 1.8 L Family 1 engines in Chevrolet cars. Starting with 2020 model year, this engine is no longer available for the United States market, due to Buick Cascada and Chevrolet Malibu Hybrid being phased out because of low sales and high importation taxes from Europe.

== Models ==
Name	Displacement	Bore x Stroke	Compression Ratio	Power	Torque
A16XHT (LVP)	1,598 cc (97.5 cu in)	79 mm × 81.5 mm (3.11 in × 3.21 in)	9.5:1	170 PS (125 kW) at 4750-6000 rpm	260 N⋅m (192 lb⋅ft) at 1650-4250 rpm; 280 N⋅m (207 lb⋅ft) (overboost)
A16SHT/B16SHT (LWC)	1,598 cc (97.5 cu in)	79 mm × 81.5 mm (3.11 in × 3.21 in)	9.5:1	200 PS (147 kW) at 5500 rpm	280 N⋅m (207 lb⋅ft) at 1650-5000 rpm; 300 N⋅m (221 lb⋅ft) at 1700–4700 rpm (overboost)
(LKN)	1,796 cc (109.6 cu in)	80.5 mm × 88.2 mm (3.17 in × 3.47 in)	11.5:1	122 PS (90 kW) at 5000 rpm	175 N⋅m (129 lb⋅ft) at 4750 rpm
SAIC 20L4E 2.0 TGI (NetBlue)	1,995 cc (121.7 cu in)	88 mm × 82 mm (3.5 in × 3.2 in)	10.0:1	231 PS (170 kW) at 5300 rpm 218 PS (160 kW) at 5300 rpm (Euro 6); 224 PS (165 kW) at 5000 rpm (Euro 5)	350 N⋅m (258 lb⋅ft) at 2500–4000 rpm 360 N⋅m (266 lb⋅ft) at 2000–4000 rpm (Euro 6); 350 N⋅m (258 lb⋅ft) at 2500–3500 rpm (Euro 5)
SAIC 20A4E 2.0 TGI (NetBlue)	1,986 cc (121.2 cu in)	82.5 mm × 92.9 mm (3.25 in × 3.66 in)		261 PS (192 kW) at 5500–6000 rpm	405 N⋅m (299 lb⋅ft) at 1750–3500 rpm

== Applications ==
The 170 PS (125 kW) Eco version of the engine (code A16XHT) is used in:

- 2013 Opel Insignia
- 2013 Opel Astra J
- 2013 Opel Cascada
- 2013 Opel Zafira Tourer

The 200 PS (147 kW) Pro version of the engine (code A16SHT) is used in:

- 2014 Opel Astra J
- 2014 Opel Cascada
- 2014 Opel Zafira Tourer
- 2016 Buick Cascada (code LWC)
- 2016 Opel Astra K

The 200 PS (147 kW) Pro version of the engine (code B16SHT - Euro 6) is used in:

- 2018–present Opel Astra K
- 2018–present Opel Insignia B

The LKN is used in:

- 2016 - 2019 Chevrolet Malibu Hybrid
- 2016 - 2018 Buick LaCrosse 30H
- 2016 - 2019 Buick Regal 30H

The 224 PS (165 kW) SAIC 20L4E (NetBlue) is used in:

- 2014–present Maxus G10 (LDV G10 Australia)
- 2015–2019 MG GS
- 2016–present Roewe RX5
- 2017–present Maxus T60 (LDV T60 Australia)
- 2018–present Maxus D90 (LDV D90 Australia)
- 2018–present Roewe RX8
- 2018–present MG HS
- 2019–present Maxus G20
- 2019–present Maxus T70

The 234 PS (172 kW) SAIC 20A4E (NetBlue) is used in:

- 2020–present Roewe iMAX8
- 2022–present Roewe RX9
- 2023–present MG7
