= Roewe RX9 =

Mid-size crossover SUV

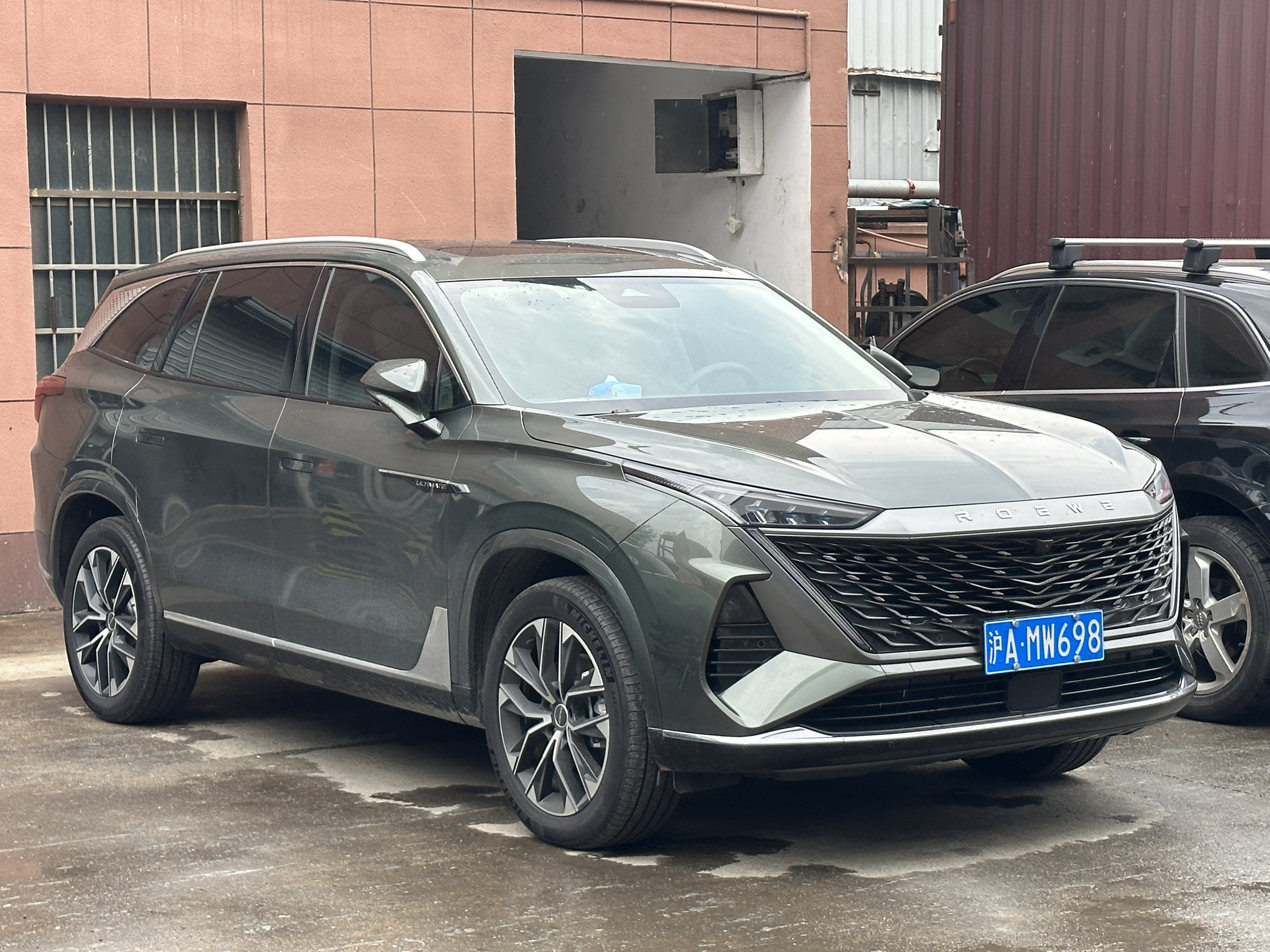

Overview
- Manufacturer: Roewe (SAIC Motor)
- Model code: IS31
- Also called: MGS9 PHEV (Europe); MG RX9 (export); MG QS (Australia and New Zealand); Moskvitch M90 (Russia)
- Production: 2023–2025 (China); 2024–present (export)
- Assembly: China: Pukou, Nanjing (SAIC Motor Pukou); Russia: Moscow (Moskvitch)

Body and chassis
- Class: Mid-size crossover SUV
- Body style: 5-door SUV
- Layout: Front-engine, front-wheel-drive; Front-engine, all-wheel-drive

Powertrain
- Engine: Petrol: 2.0 L 20A4E turbo I4; Petrol plug-in hybrid: 1.5 L GS61H turbo I4 (MGS9 PHEV)
- Electric motor: Permanent magnet synchronous motor (MGS9 PHEV)
- Power output: 147 kW (200 PS; 197 hp) (Moskvich M90); 178 kW (242 PS; 239 hp) (2.0 L); 220 kW (299 PS; 295 hp) (MGS9 PHEV)
- Transmission: 9-speed automatic (2.0 L); Single speed automatic (MGS9 PHEV)
- Hybrid drivetrain: PHEV
- Battery: 24.7 kWh CATL LFP (PHEV)

Dimensions
- Wheelbase: 2,915 mm (114.8 in)
- Length: 4,983 mm (196.2 in)
- Width: 1,967 mm (77.4 in)
- Height: 1,786 mm (70.3 in)
- Kerb weight: 1,940–2,030 kg (4,277–4,475 lb)

Chronology
- Predecessor: Roewe RX8

The Roewe RX9 (Chinese: 荣威RX9; pinyin: Róngwēi RX9) is a mid-size crossover SUV produced by SAIC Motor under the Roewe brand. It is marketed outside China under the MG brand as the MGS9 PHEV, MG RX9 and MG QS.

== Overview ==
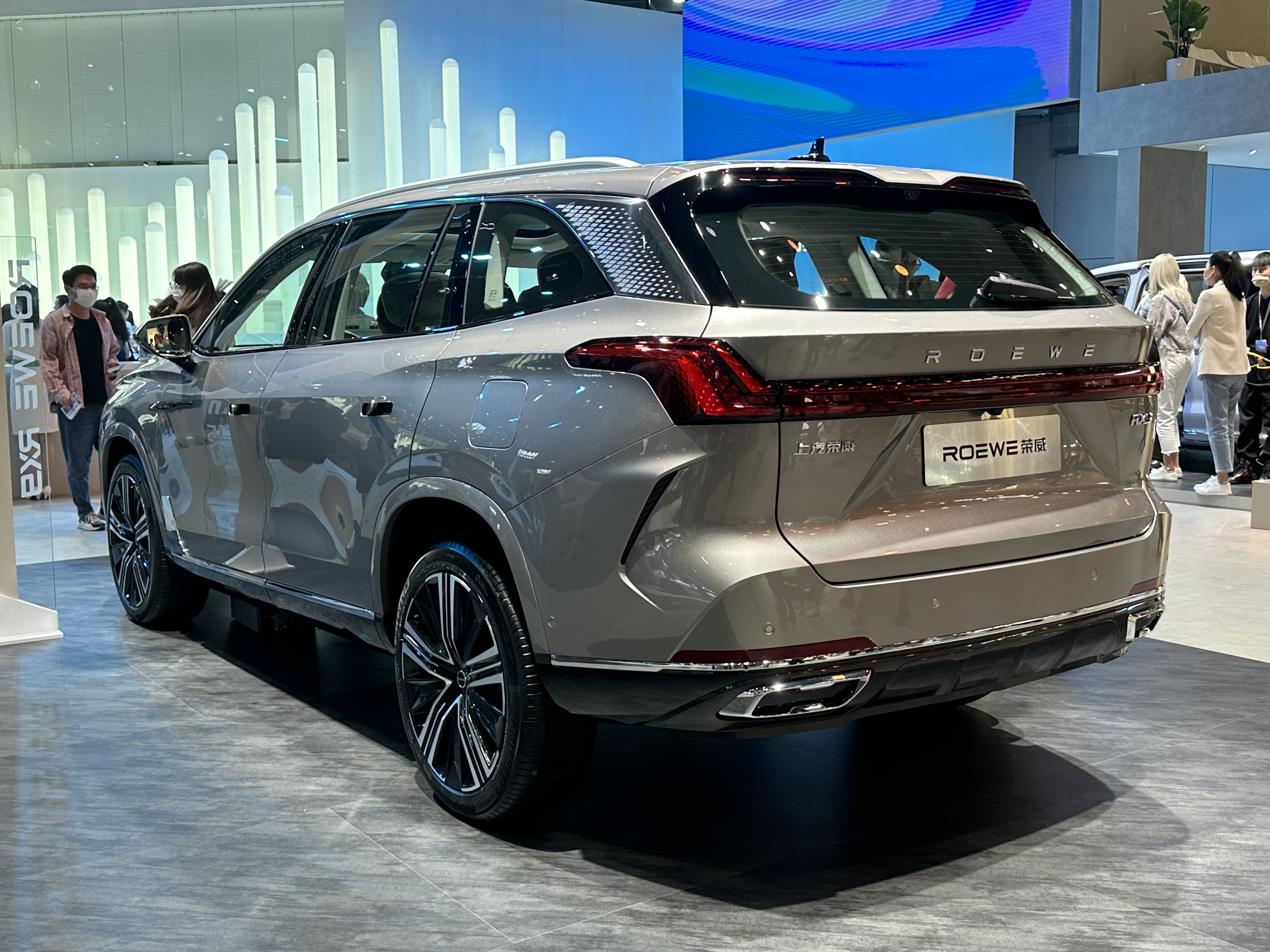
Rear view

In August 2022, Roewe introduced the RX9 to expand its presence in the premium SUV segment with a model positioned above the Roewe RX8. Although originally planned for a third-quarter release that year, delays pushed its market launch to February 2023, as announced by the company in December 2022. The RX9 is available with three rows of seating, offering space for six or seven passengers.

Unlike more traditional design of the RX8 launched in 2018, the new model features a bolder, more modern appearance. It is distinguished by an aggressive front end with a large trapezoidal grille, slim headlights, and angled LED daytime running lights. At the rear, the taillights are connected by a light strip, and the gently sloping roofline ends in a tilted rear window. Aerodynamic efficiency was enhanced through features like flush door handles.

The interior reflects design trends popular among Chinese automakers in the early 2020s, emphasising minimalism and premium materials such as aluminium, leather, and light-toned finishes. A three-part display spanning the dashboard, consists of a digital instrument cluster, a central multimedia touchscreen, and a front passenger screen.

== Markets ==
=== Australia ===
The RX9 was launched in Australia as the MG QS on 14 May 2025. It is the model's first right-hand drive market. It is powered by the 2.0-litre turbocharged petrol engine and it is offered in two grades: Excite (2WD) and Essence (AWD).

=== Europe ===
The RX9 was released in Europe as the MGS9 PHEV in March 2026 starting in the United Kingdom, as the first MG seven-seat vehicle in Europe. In Europe, it is powered by the 1.5-litre turbocharged petrol plug-in hybrid and is available in Comfort and Premium trims.

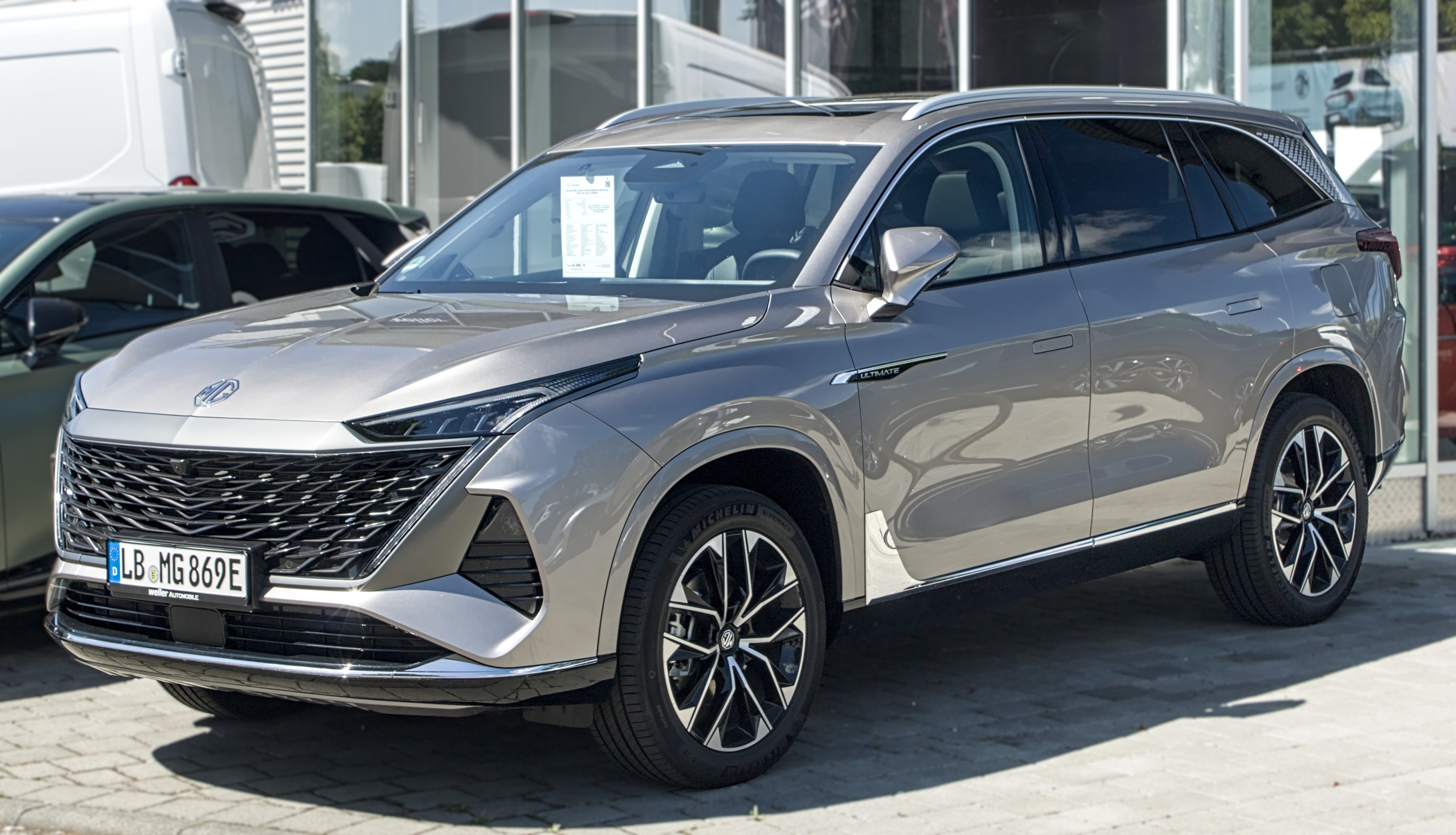
MGS9 PHEV

Rear view

=== Mexico ===
The RX9 was launched in Mexico on 7 November 2024, alongside the MG7. It is available with two trim levels: Elegance and Premier, it is powered by the 2.0-litre turbocharged petrol engine.

=== Middle East ===
The RX9 was launched in the Middle East as the MG RX9 alongside the facelifted MG5 sedan on 29 October 2024, it is powered by the 2.0-litre turbocharged petrol engine and it is offered in three grades; STD (2WD), COM (4WD) and LUX (4WD).

=== Philippines ===
The RX9 was launched in the Philippines as the MG RX9 on 4 June 2026, alongside the HS PHEV and the MG4 EV Urban. It is available in the sole PHEV variant powered by the 1.5-litre turbocharged petrol plug-in hybrid.

=== Russia ===
The model is sold in Russia as Moskvich M90.

== Specifications ==
The RX9 offers a single four-cylinder turbocharged petrol engine. With a capacity of 2 litres, it has a maximum power of 178 kW (242 PS; 239 hp) and is equipped with a 9-speed automatic transmission.

Specs
Model	Years	Layout	Engine	Transmission	Power	Torque	Top speed
RX9	2023–present	FWD	2.0 L Turbo I4	9-speed automatic	178 kW (242 PS; 239 hp) at 5,300 rpm	392 N⋅m (289 lb⋅ft) at 1,750–3,500 rpm	200 km/h (124 mph)
RX9	2023–present	AWD	2.0 L Turbo I4	9-speed automatic	178 kW (242 PS; 239 hp) at 5,300 rpm	392 N⋅m (289 lb⋅ft) at 1,750–3,500 rpm	200 km/h (124 mph)

== Safety ==
ANCAP test results MG QS (2025, aligned with Euro NCAP)
Test	Points	%
Overall:	5 /5 stars	
Adult occupant:	35.23	88%
Child occupant:	42.61	86%
Pedestrian:	48.05	76%
Safety assist:	14.40	80%

== Sales ==
Year	China
2022	8
2023	1,901
2024	2,087
