= Maxus D90 =

Mid-size SUV

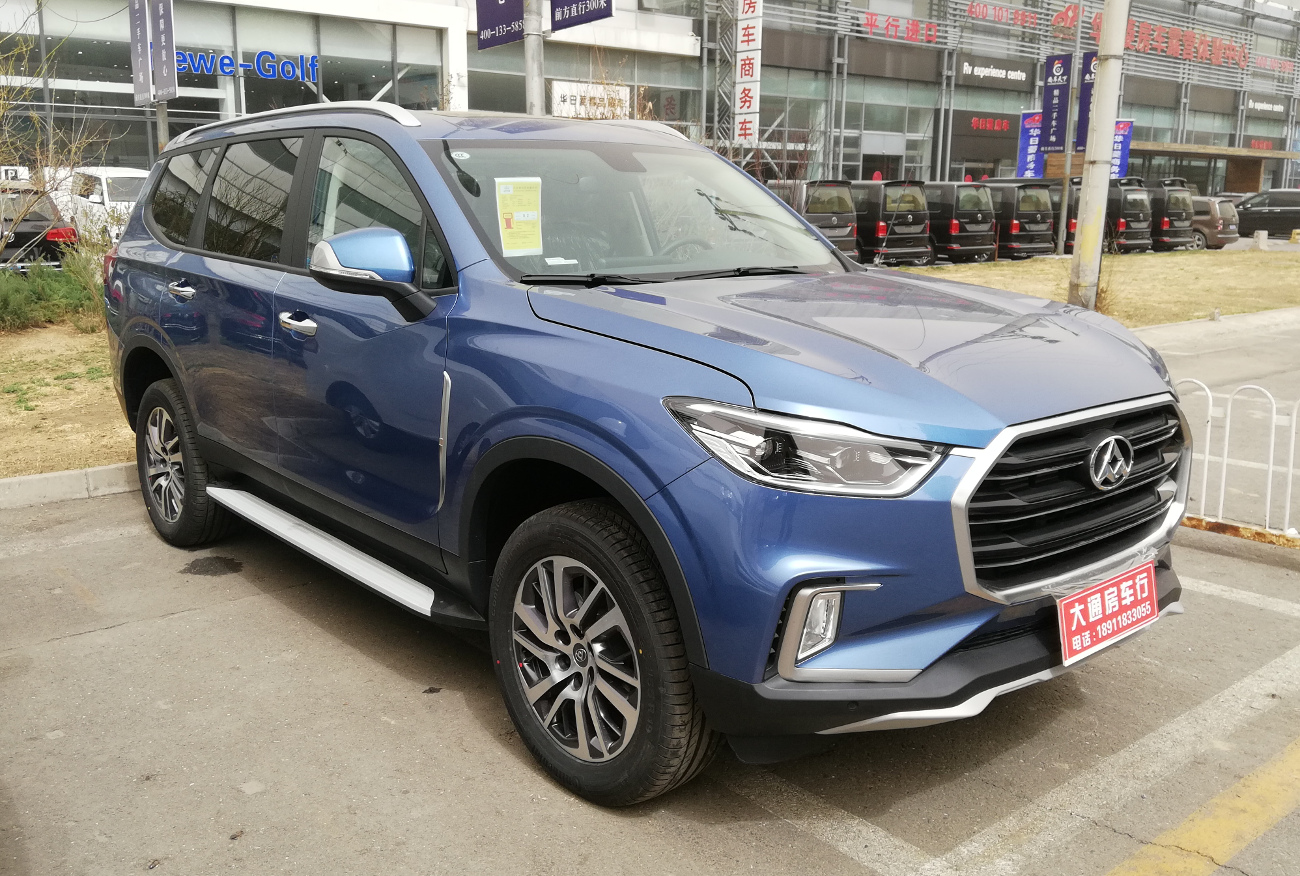

Overview
- Manufacturer: Maxus (SAIC Motor)
- Also called: LDV D90 (Australia); MG Gloster (India); MG Majestor (India); MG Rakan (Kuwait)
- Production: 2017–present
- Assembly: China: Wuxi, Jiangsu (SAIC Maxus Wuxi Branch); India: Halol, Gujarat (JSW MG Motor India)

Body and chassis
- Class: Mid-size SUV
- Body style: 5-door SUV
- Layout: Front-engine, rear-wheel-drive; Front-engine, four-wheel-drive
- Chassis: Body-on-frame
- Related: Maxus T60; Roewe RX8

Powertrain
- Engine: 2.0 L 20L4E turbo I4 (petrol); 2.0 L SC20M turbo I4 (diesel); 2.0 L SC20M twin-turbo I4 (diesel)

Dimensions
- Wheelbase: 2,950 mm (116.1 in)
- Length: 5,005 mm (197.0 in)
- Width: 1,932 mm (76.1 in)
- Height: 1,875 mm (73.8 in)
- Curb weight: 2,370 kg (5,225 lb)

The Maxus D90 is a mid-size SUV produced by Chinese automaker SAIC Motor under the sub-brand Maxus since October 2017.

== Overview ==
The Maxus D90 was previewed by the Maxus D90 concept SUV during the 2016 Beijing Auto Show.

The D90 debuted at the 2016 Guangzhou International Motor Show in Guangzhou, China. It is based on the T60 pick-up ladder frame chassis.

The model comes with a 2.0-litre 20L4E TGI turbocharged petrol engine and 6 speed manual and tiptronic gearbox. It is available in 5 and 7 seater configurations and 8 trim levels It also comes with 5 different grilles called Star Style, Mesh Inlet, Light black tri-grid, Chromium tri-gate and the Mesh Inlet grille with the Maxus logo.

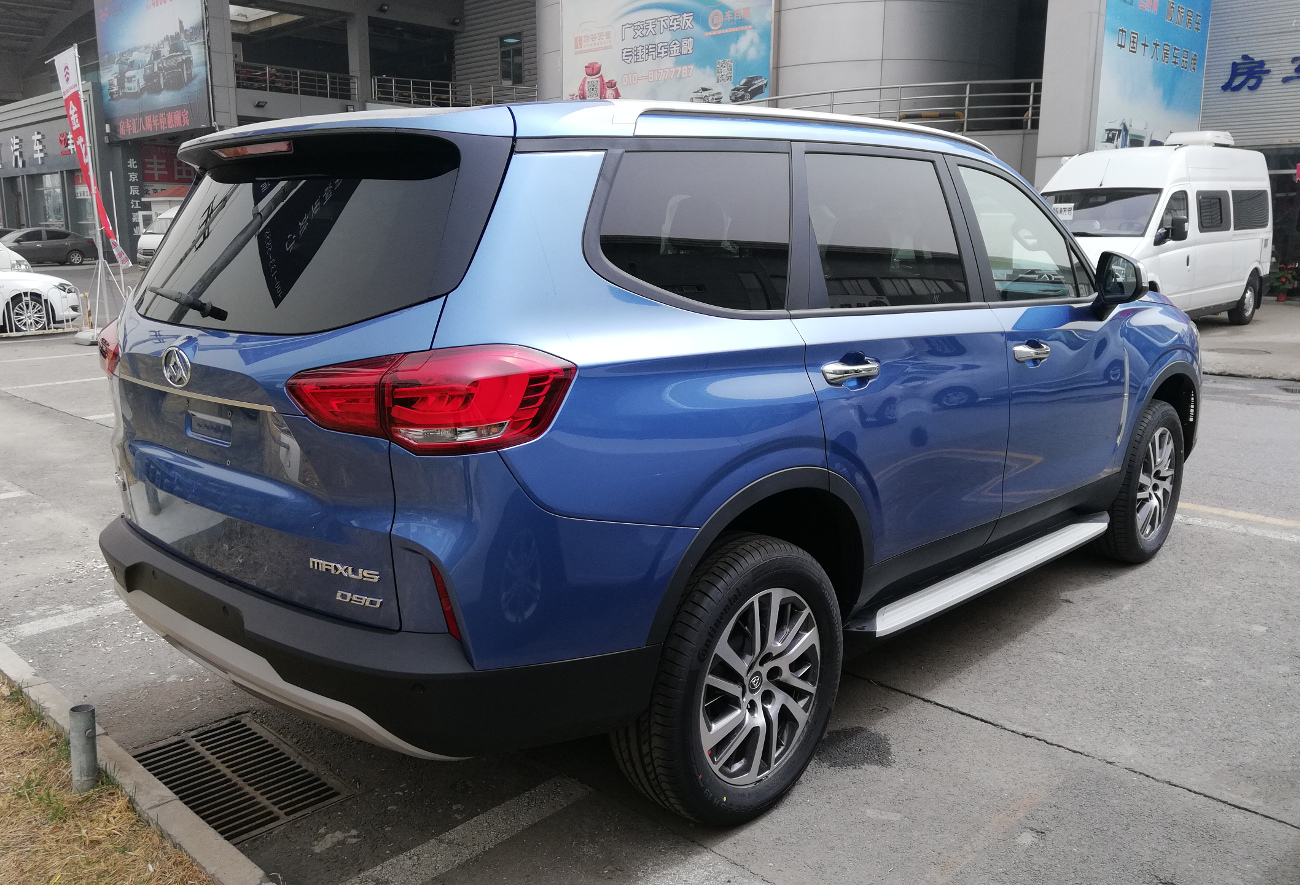
Rear view

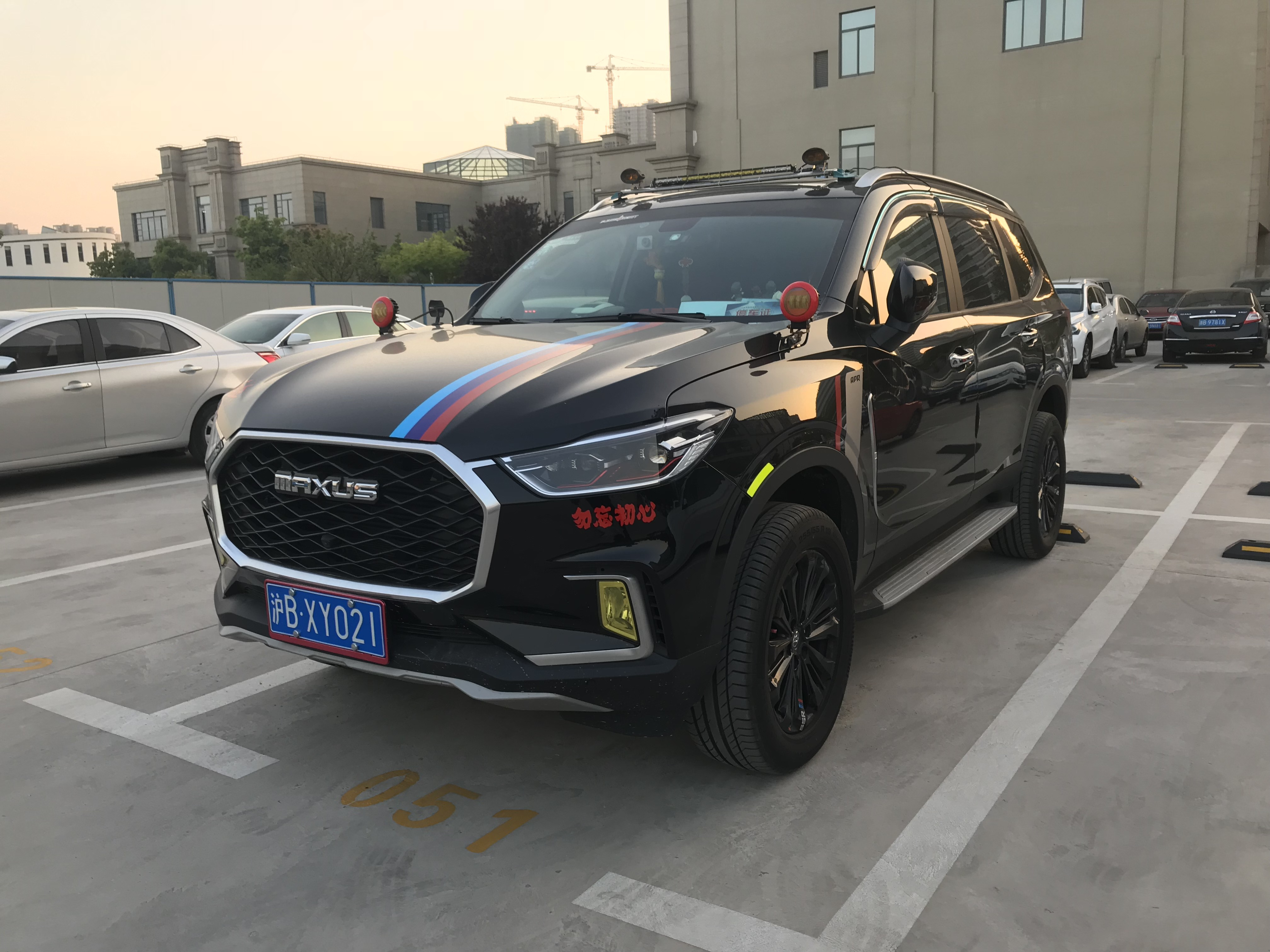
Maxus D90 Pro

== Maxus Territory ==
The Maxus Territory (领地) was presented in August of the Chengdu Motor Show. The Territory is a luxury version of the Maxus D90.

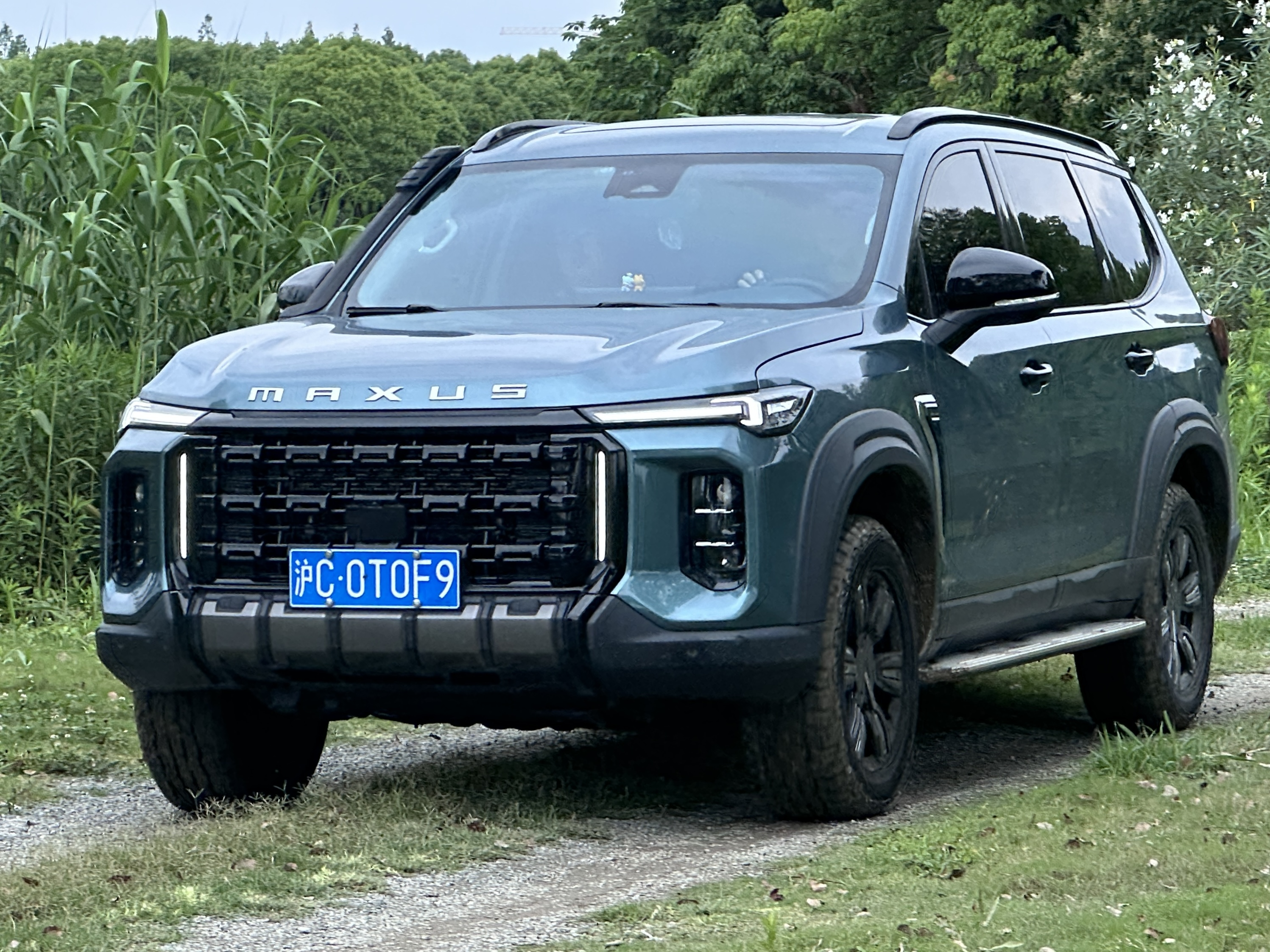
Maxus Territory

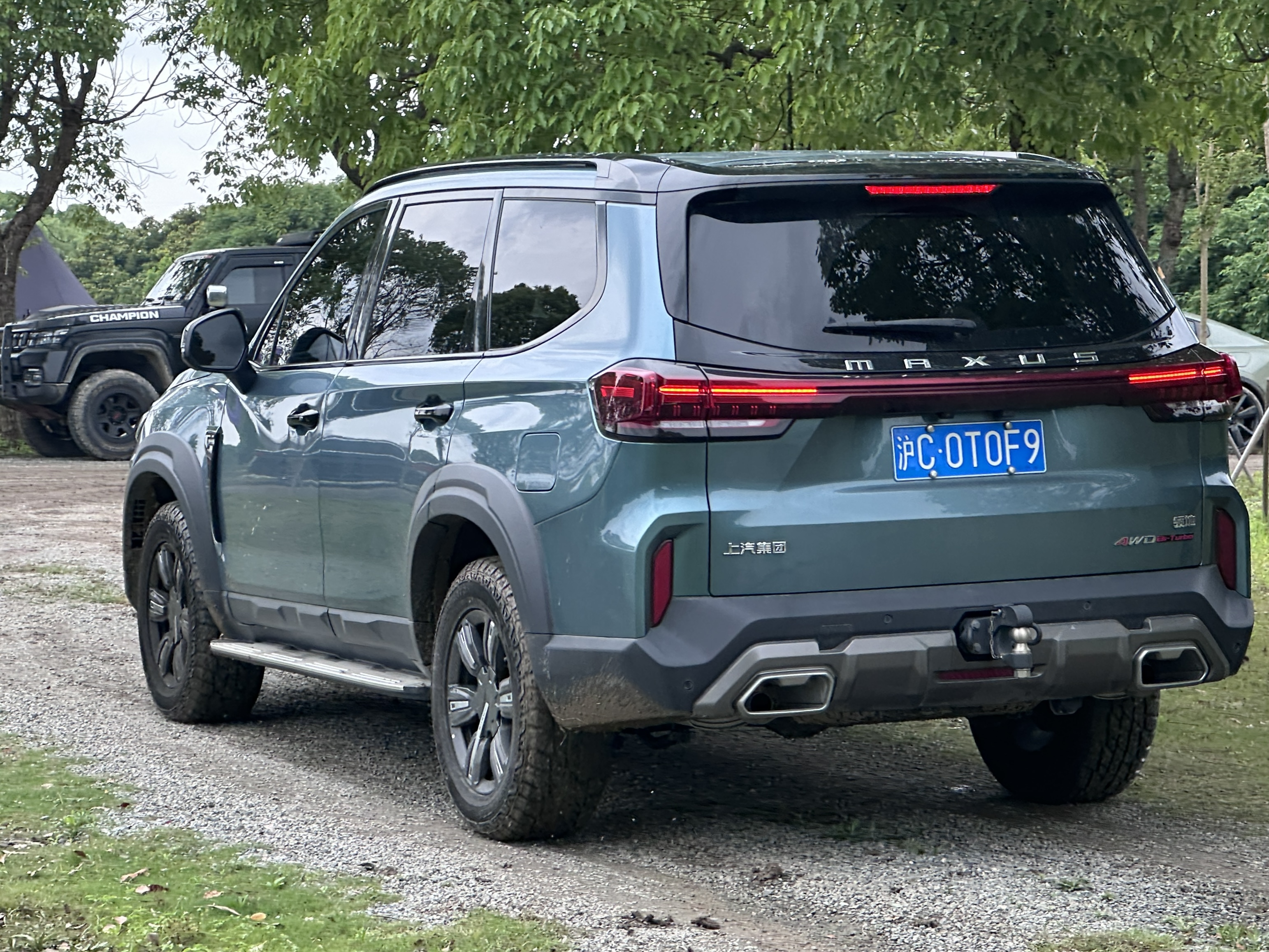
Maxus Territory (rear)

== MG rebadged models ==
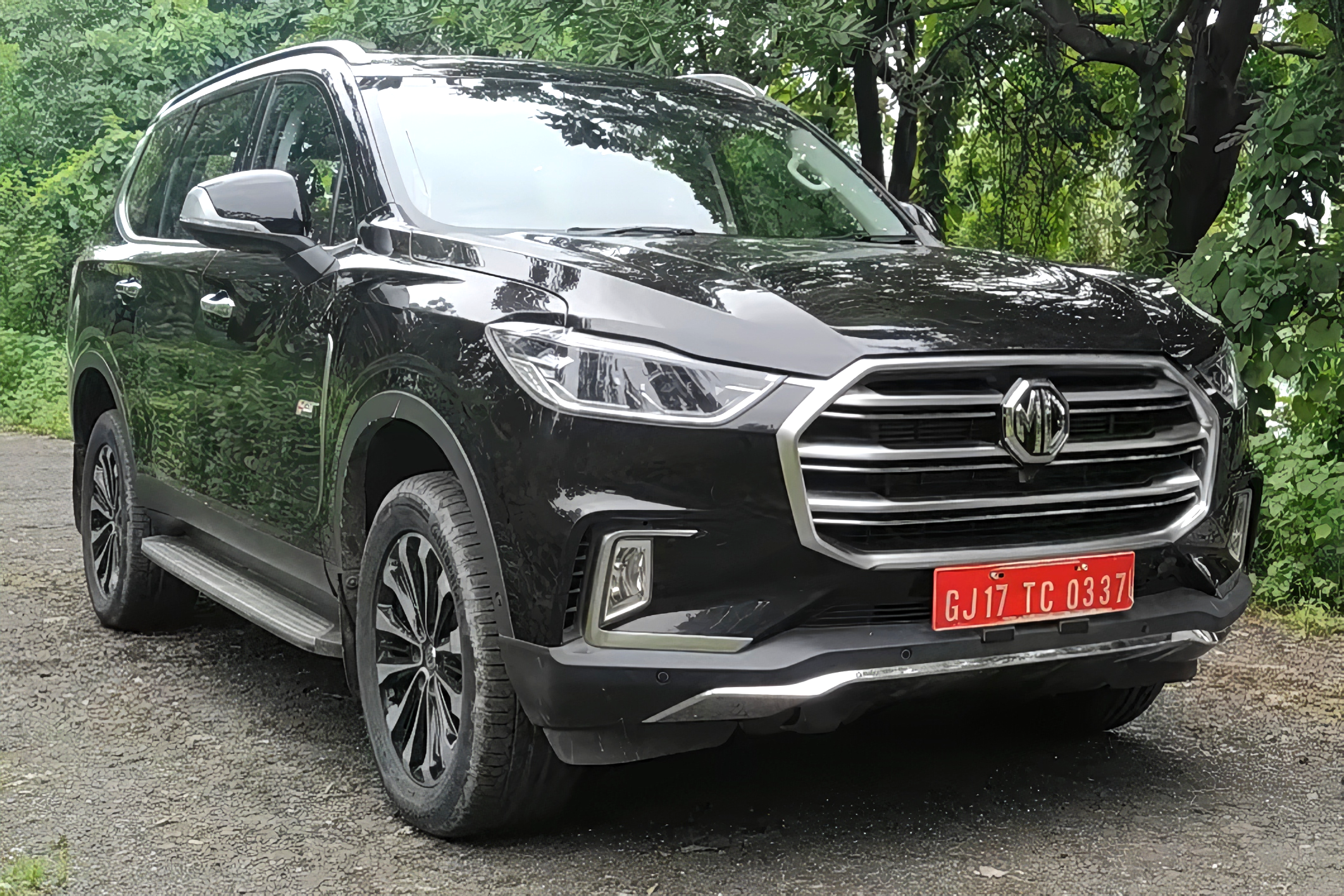
MG Gloster

The MG Gloster is a rebadged version of the D90 produced by MG Motor India for the Indian market.

The MG Majestor was unveiled as a rebadged version of Maxus Territory on 18 January 2025 on Bharat Auto Expo. The car was launched in India on 27 May 2026, with starting price of 40.99L INR (ex. showroom).

In Kuwait, the model was unveiled as the MG Rakan on 23 January 2026, it is also a rebadged version of Maxus Territory. It is the first model to have an Arabic name.

== Powertrains ==
Engines
Model	Transmission	Engine	Displacement	Power	Torque	Emission standard	Fuel
SDEC SC20M 163 Q6A single-turbocharger	6-speed manual & automatic 8-speed automatic	I4	1,996 cc (2.0 L)	120 kW (163 PS; 161 bhp) at 4000 rpm	375 N⋅m (277 lb⋅ft) at 1500-2400 rpm	Euro 6b	Diesel
SDEC SC20M 218 Q6A twin-turbocharger (D90 Pro)	6-speed manual & automatic 8-speed automatic	I4	1,996 cc (2.0 L)	160 kW (218 PS; 215 bhp) at 4000 rpm	480 N⋅m (354 lb⋅ft) at 1500-2400 rpm	Euro 6b	Diesel
SAIC-GM 20L4E TGI	6-speed manual & automatic 8-speed automatic	I4	1,995 cc (2.0 L)	157 kW (213 PS; 211 bhp) at 5500 rpm	350 N⋅m (258 lb⋅ft) at 4000 rpm	Euro 6	Petrol

== Safety ==
ANCAP test results LDV D90 (2017)
Test	Score
Overall	5 /5 stars
Frontal offset	14.05/16
Side impact	16/16
Pole	2/2
Seat belt reminders	3/3
Whiplash protection	Good
Pedestrian protection	Adequate
Electronic stability control	Standard

== Sales ==
	India
	MG Gloster
2021	3,970
2022	2,542
2023	2,848
2024	2,200
