= Opel Cascada =

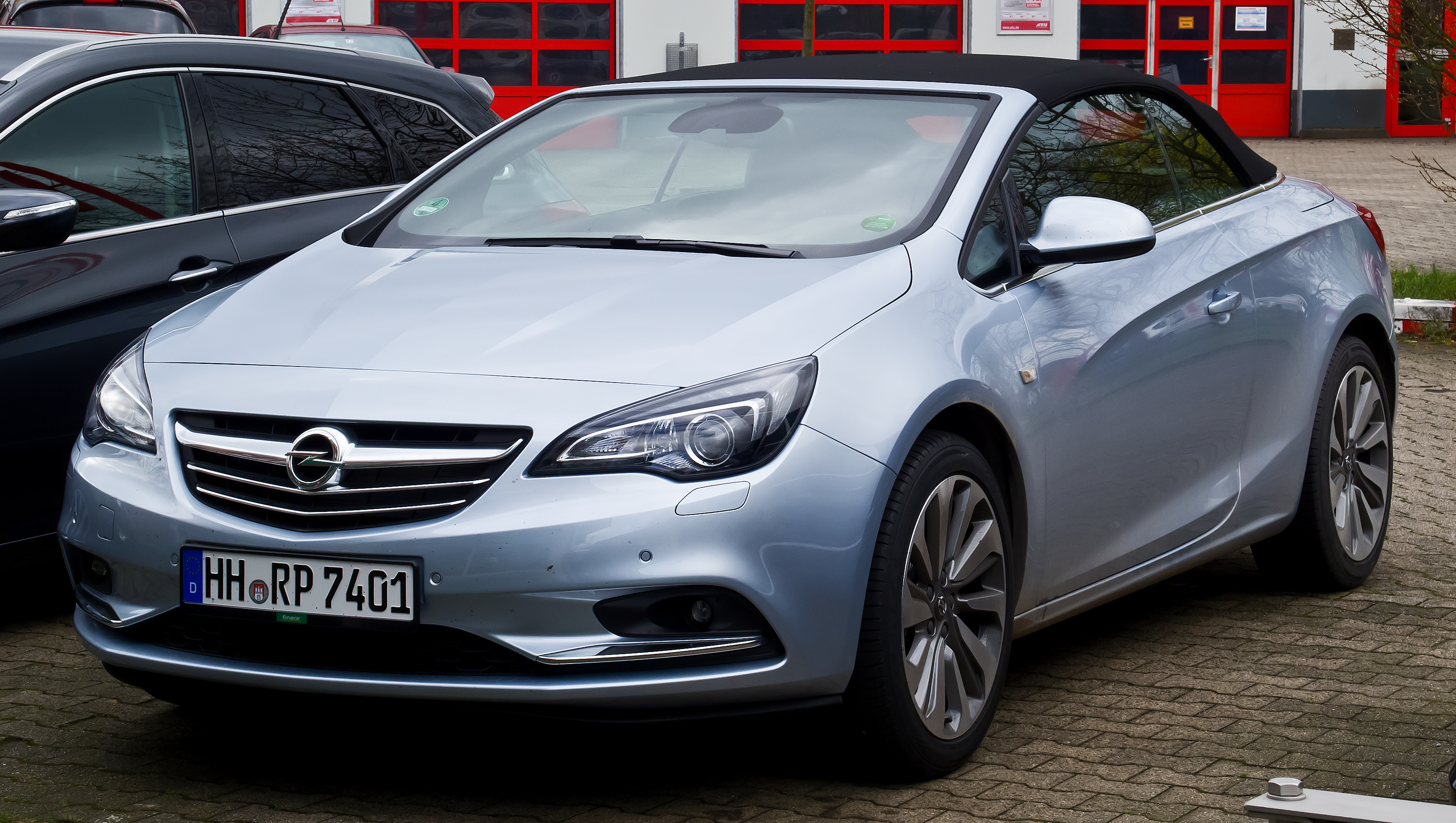

Overview
- Manufacturer: Opel (General Motors)
- Also called: Buick Cascada (US); Vauxhall Cascada (UK); Holden Cascada (Australasia); Opel Cabrio (Spain)
- Production: 2013–2019
- Assembly: Poland: Gliwice (Opel Manufacturing Poland)
- Designer: Andrew Dyson; Elizabeth Wetzel; Mark Adams

Body and chassis
- Class: Compact car (C)
- Body style: 2-door convertible
- Layout: Front-engine, front-wheel-drive
- Platform: Delta II platform
- Related: Opel Astra J Opel Zafira Tourer C

Powertrain
- Engine: petrol: 1.4 L B14NET (LUJ) turbo I4; 1.6 L A16XHT (LVP) turbo I4; 1.6 L A16SHT (LWC) turbo I4; diesel: 2.0 L B20DTH (LFS) turbo I4
- Transmission: 6-speed GM F40 manual 6-speed GM 6T45 (MH7) automatic

Dimensions
- Wheelbase: 2,695 mm (106.1 in)
- Length: 4,696 mm (184.9 in)
- Width: 1,839 mm (72.4 in)
- Height: 1,443 mm (56.8 in)
- Curb weight: 1,701–1,816 kg (3,750–4,004 lb)

Chronology
- Predecessor: Opel Astra H TwinTop

The Opel Cascada is a four-passenger fabric-roof convertible, manufactured and marketed by Opel across a single generation for model years 2013 through 2019, prioritizing year-round touring comfort over sportiness.

Nearly identical badge engineered variants were marketed globally using the Cascada nameplate under four General Motors brands: Opel, Vauxhall, Holden, and Buick. It was also sold under the Opel Cabrio nameplate in Spain.

The 2+2 convertible was engineered at Opel's International Technical Engineering Center in Rüsselsheim, Germany, and was styled under the direction of Mark Adams, head of Opel design, at Opel's Rüsselsheim Design Center, with Andrew Dyson (exterior) and Elizabeth Wetzel (interior).

After debuting at the 2012 Geneva Auto Show, the brand variants were manufactured in Gliwice, Poland, up until assembly ended on 28 June 2019, with a combined total of 48,500 produced and the final Cascada manufactured for the US market.

The Cascada derives its name from the Spanish word for waterfall.

== History and background ==
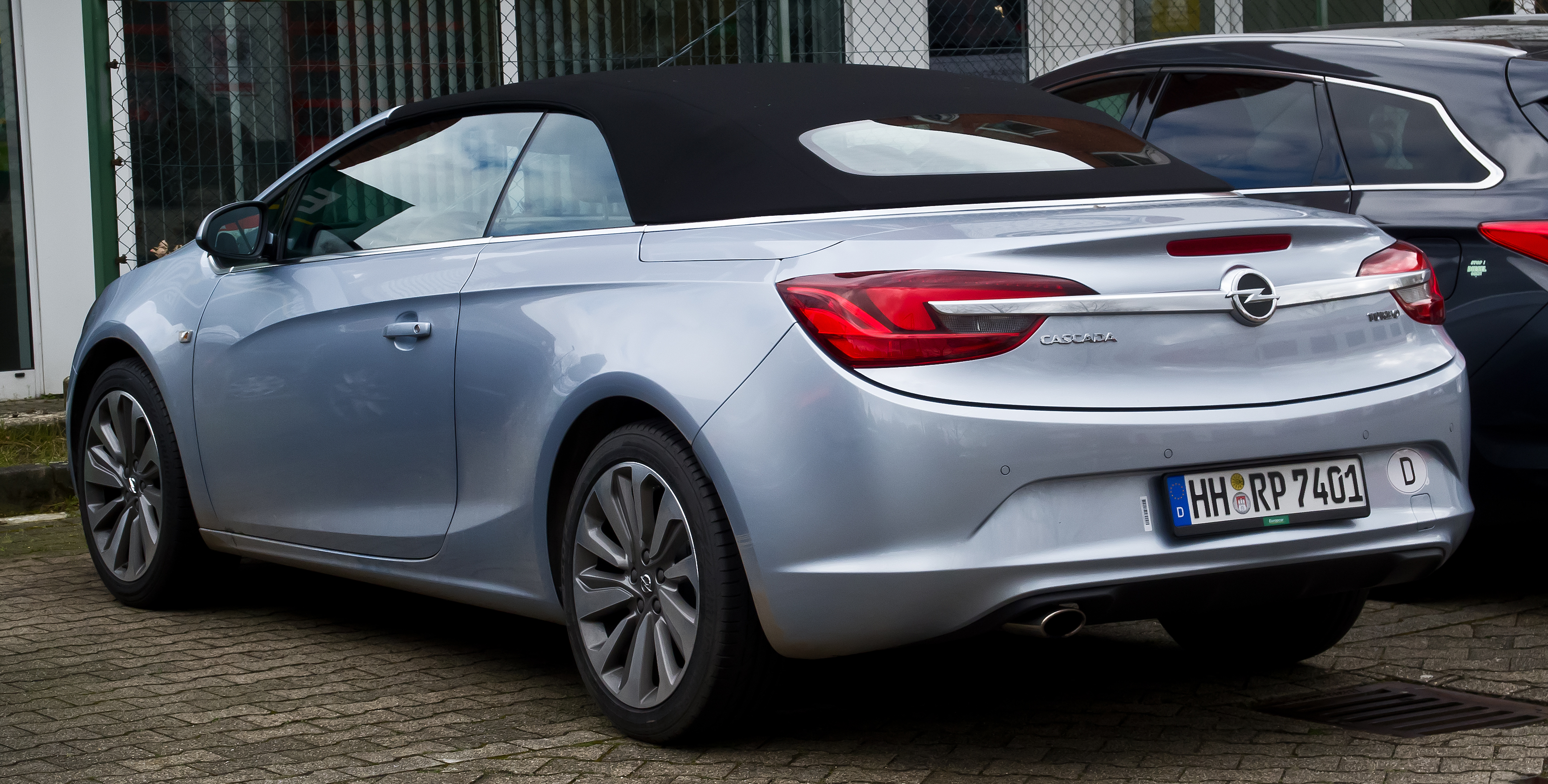
Opel Cascada

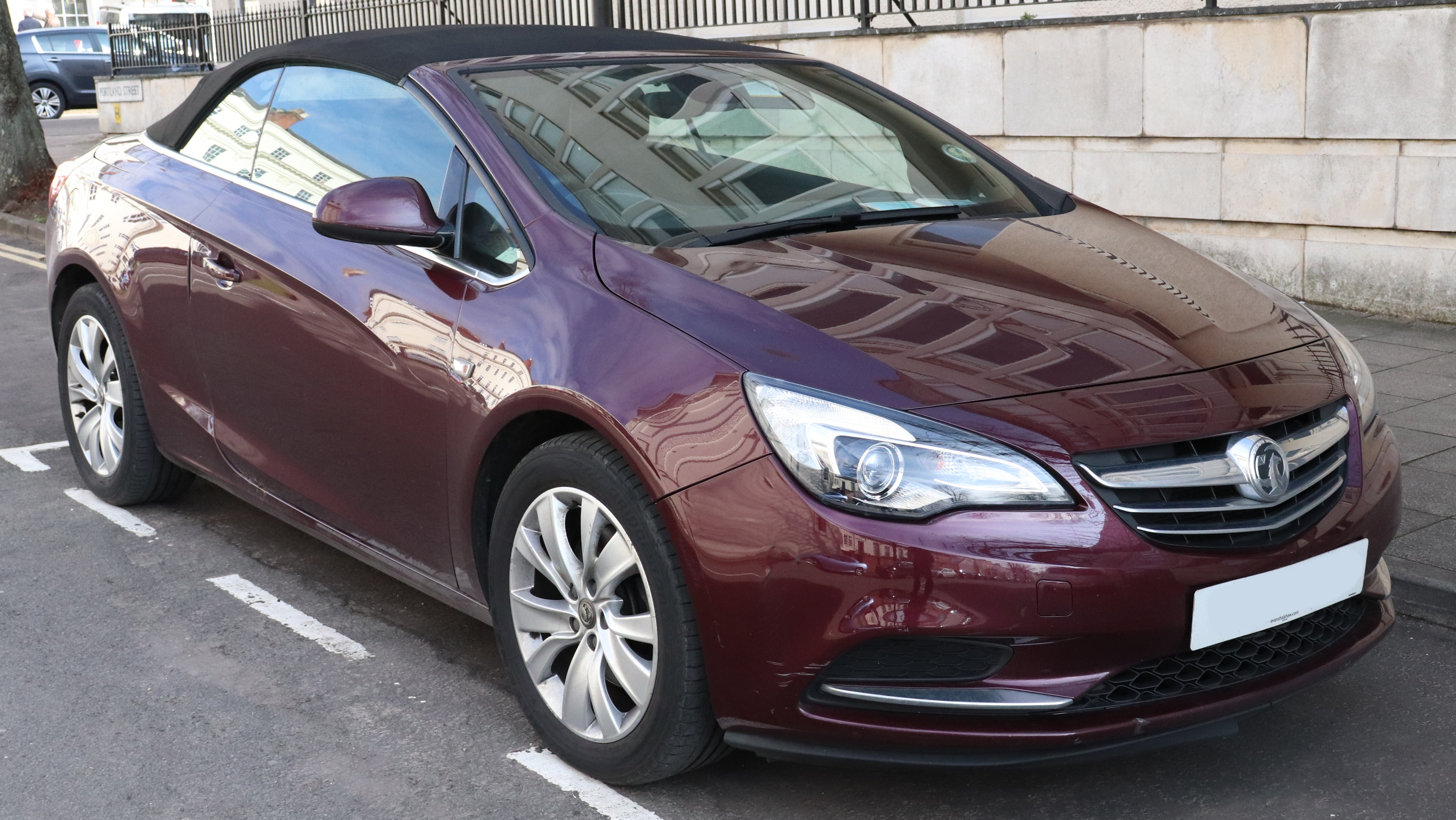
Vauxhall Cascada

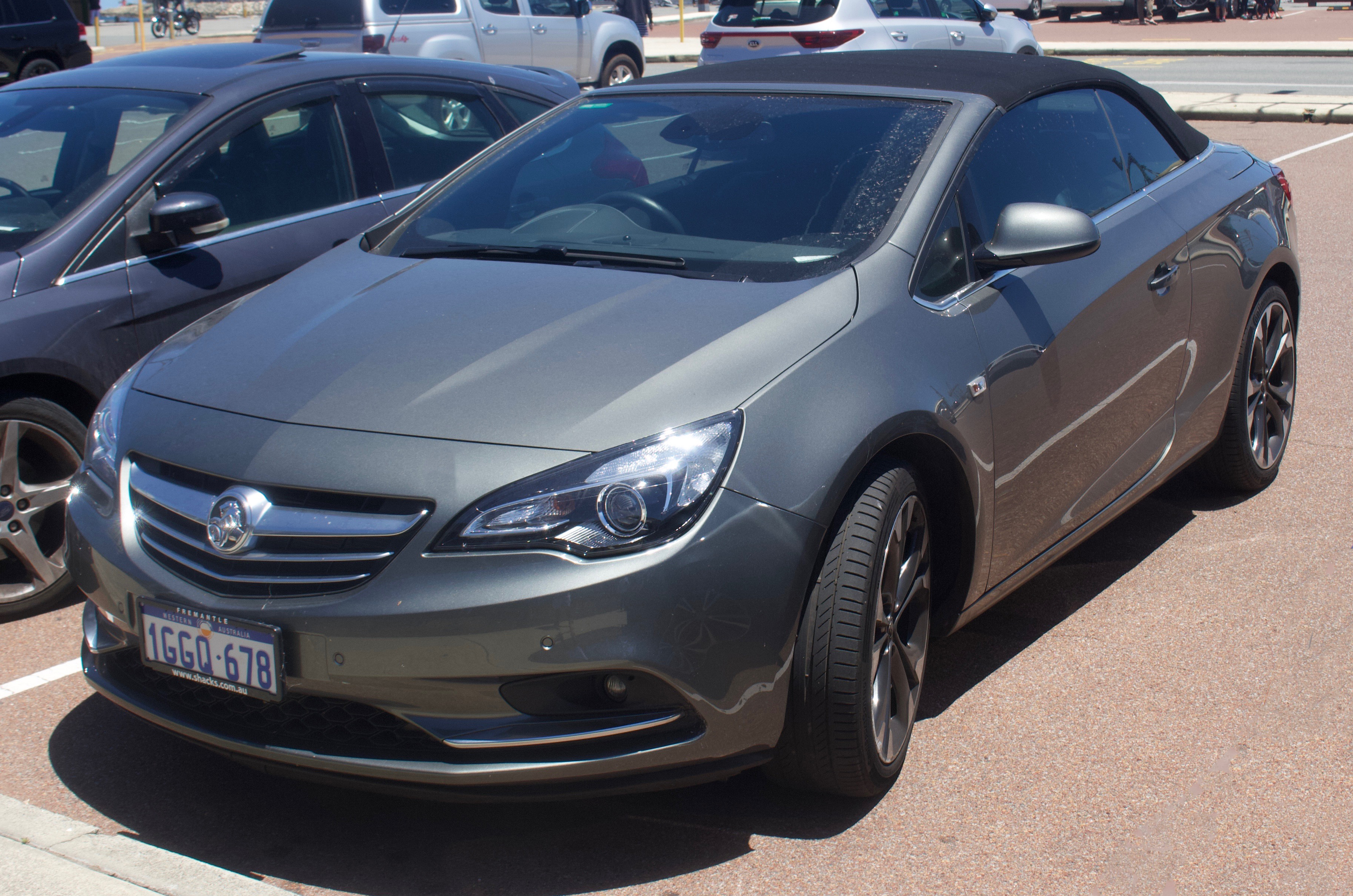
Holden Cascada

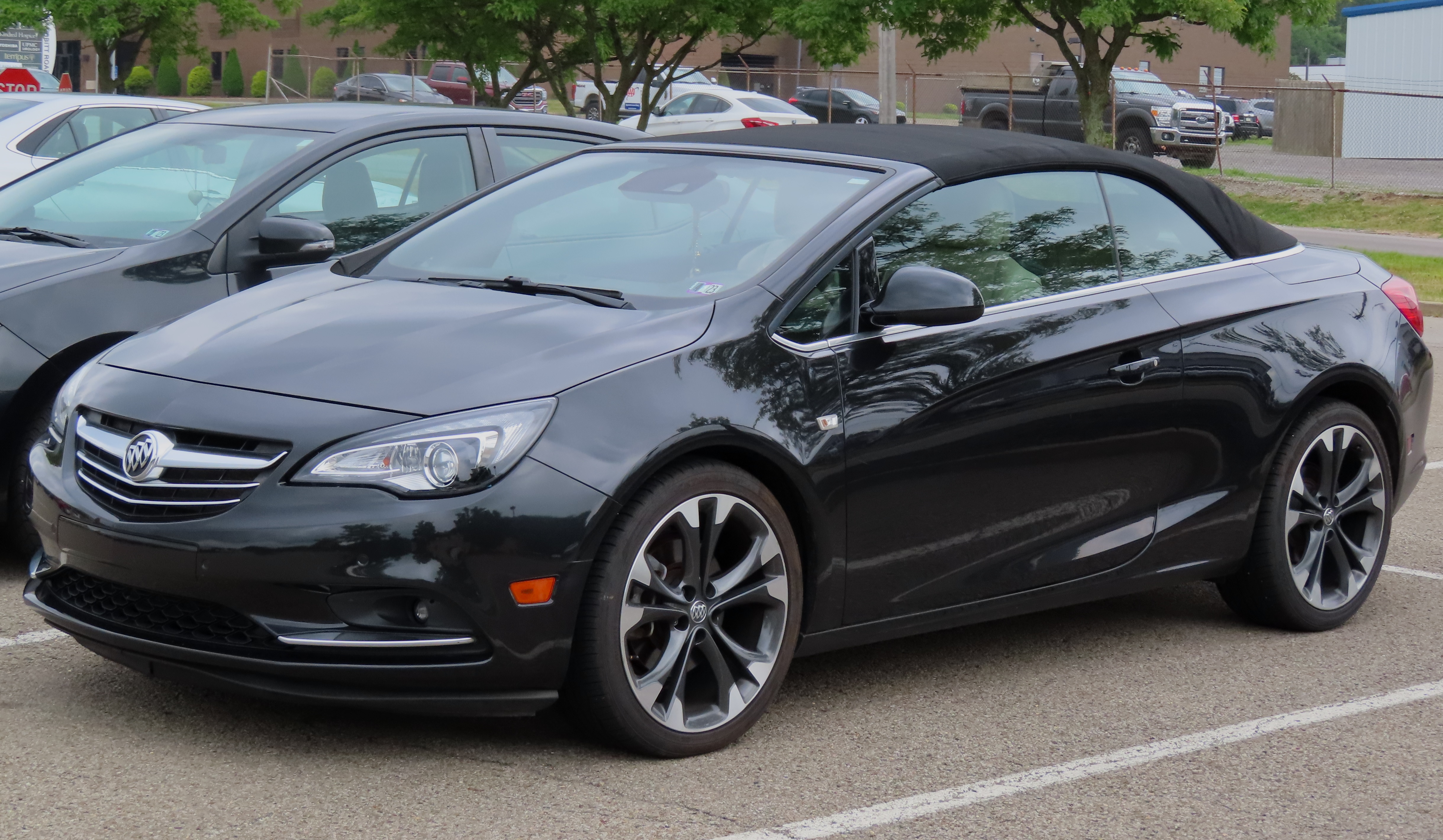
Buick Cascada

Engineered and styled in Germany, and manufactured in Poland (with its 200-hp 1.6 litre engine produced in Hungary and its 6-speed automatic transmission imported from Mexico), the Cascada was marketed globally under four General Motors brands:

- Opel, 2013–2019, Europe
- Vauxhall, 2013–2018, UK
- Holden, 2014–2017, Australia and New Zealand
- Buick, 2016–2019, US and China

The Opel Cascada debuted in late 2012 and was launched on 20 April 2013, offering two four-cylinder petrol engines, 1.4-litre or 1.6-litre, as well as a 2.0-litre diesel. These were offered with either a six-speed manual or six-speed automatic.

The Vauxhall Cascada launched in the UK in March 2013 with a choice of 140PS 1.4-litre and 170PS 1.6-litre turbo petrols. This was followed by a 1.6-litre Spark Ignition Direct Injection (SIDI) engine producing 200PS from October 2013. The line-up also included a 2.0-litre CDTI diesel. These were offered with six-speed manual or automatic gearboxes.

The Buick Cascada debuted at the 2015 North American International Auto Show in January 2015, and went on sale in the US in January 2016, as the brand's first factory convertible since the 1991 Buick Reatta, and first two-door model since the 1999 Buick Riviera. More than 600 changes were necessary to meet U.S. safety and comfort requirements. The Buick was available in three trim levels: Base (1SV), Premium, and Sport Touring—all powered by the 200 hp (150 kW) 1.6-liter inline-four engine and mated to a six-speed automatic transmission. GM did not market the Buick Cascada in Canada and Mexico, making it exclusive to China and the United States.

The Holden Cascada went on sale in Oceania in April 2015 as the successor to Holden's Astra TwinTop, discontinued in 2009. At launch, the Holden variant was offered with only the 1.6L petrol engine and a six speed automatic. Two trim levels were available which are base and launch edition. The Launch edition offered 20-inch alloy wheels, nappa leather sport seats, ventilated front seats, adaptive bi-xenon headlights and LED daytime running lights. Holden ended sales of the Cascada on 1 May 2017.

All Cascada variants were developed during the period when General Motors had filed for Chapter 11 bankruptcy and its restructuring commenced. As the Cascada neared the end of its production, Opel was sold to Groupe PSA (2017), and the convertible segment experienced a sharp decline globally. In February 2019, GM confirmed it would end marketing the Cascada, after Groupe PSA confirmed it would not continue future production—noting also low sales, especially in the United States. Production of the Buick Cascada ended on June 28, 2019.

== Design ==
The Cascada uses GM's Delta II platform shared with its compact front-wheel-drive cars and small crossover SUVs, including the Opel Astra J, with which it shares much of its mechanical componentry as well as much of its instrument panel.

Cascada specifications, trim and equipment levels vary slightly between the Opel, Buick, Vauxhall and Holden badge-engineered variants, with shared standard equipment including electric park brake, sport seats, French stitching on the instrument panel, DAB Radio, auto headlights and wipers, cruise control, and seven-inch Intellilink Infotainment System.

Available ergonomic seats for the driver and front passenger were certified by the Aktion Gesunder Rücken (AGR, "Campaign for Healthier Backs"), an independent panel of back experts. The AGR accredited front seats offered six-way movement and a broad range of adjustment, with a powered, pneumatic lumbar support, a 60 mm (2.4 in) seat cushion extender and a long, 280 mm (11.0 in) fore/aft travel movement.

Where equipped with leather, the Cascada interior uses the Bayer Cool Leather System, which uses specific dyes and pigments to reflect solar infrared; improve thermal comfort, lower the leather surface temperatures up to 20–30 °C (68–86 °F) less and improve shrinkage properties.

Regional differences include ISOFIX points standard both Opel, Vauxhall and Holden models while the Holden Cascada also has top tether mounts. Excluding Holden, all Buick, Opel and Vauxhall (Elite trim from 2016) Cascadas include GM's OnStar System as of 2016 as GM expanded the service into Europe.

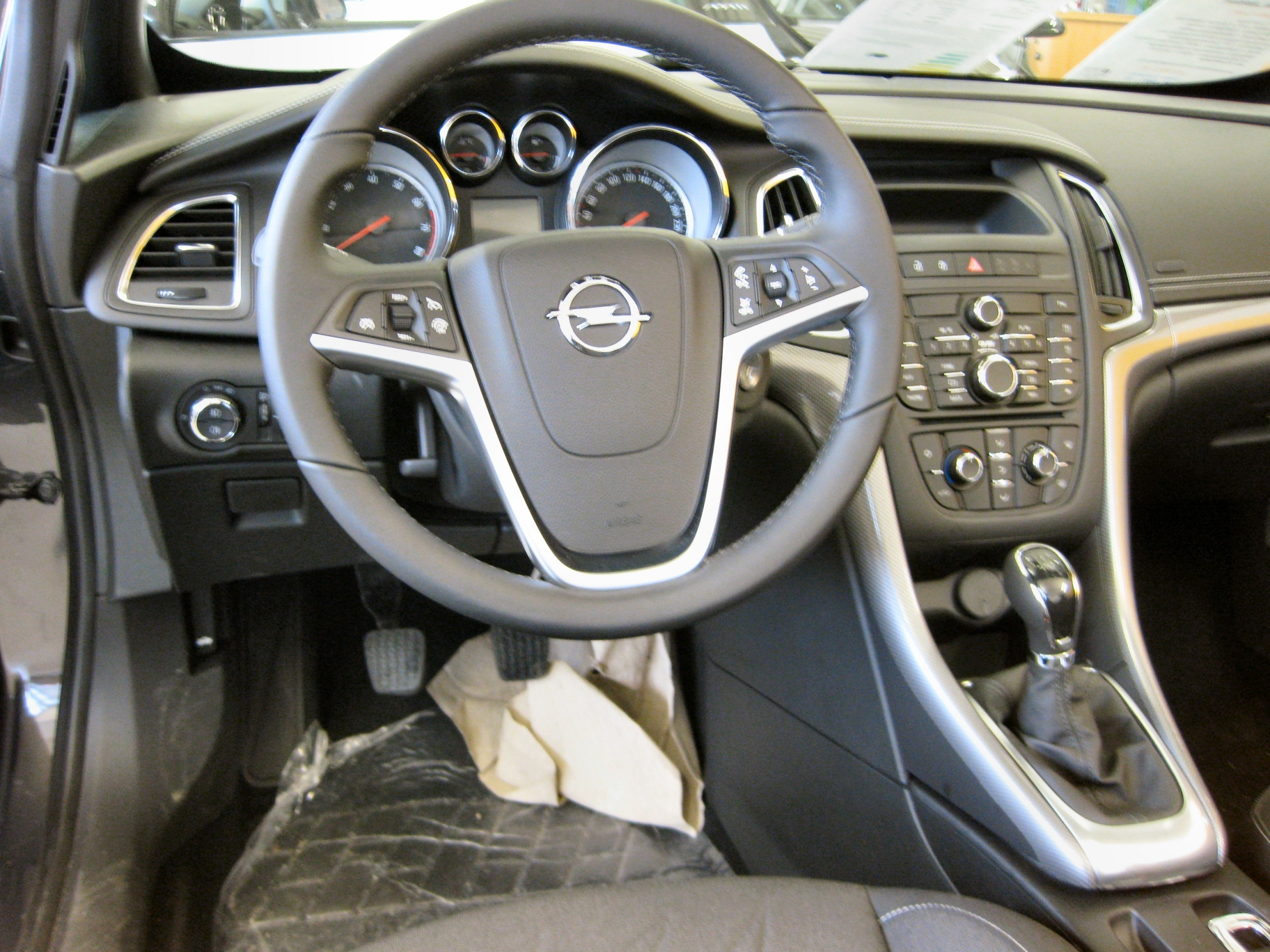
A Opel Cascada interior without IntelliLink infotainment system.

Cargo capacity is 380 litres (13.4 cu ft) with the top raised and 280 litres (9.9 cu ft) with the top stowed. To allow for longer cargo, each side of the 50/50 split rear seatbacks could be lowered by their own control, while standing at the open rear trunk—via an electro-magnetic system, marketed as Flexfold. Because the taillights are entirely located on the trunk lid, a second set of tail lights inside the trunk remain visible when the lid is raised, complying with safety regulations in Europe and other countries.

Front seats have automatic shoulder-belt presenters, where the outboard seatbelt buckle is mounted on an electrically powered telescopic arm, which extends forward, "presenting" the seatbelt to driver or front passenger—triggered when the door is closed and the ignition is switched on. The arm retracts when the seatbelt is fastened.

A system marketed as Easy Entry is activated by manually releasing the front seat back and tilting it forward. This electronically moves the front seats forward to facilitate access to the 2+2 rear seating, which is moved back again by tilting the seat rearward. As the driver or passenger seat moves back and senses the knees of a rear occupant, it stops and returns the seat forward approximately an inch.

Structurally, the passenger cell primarily uses high-strength and ultra-high-strength steels. Built into the doors at the beltline, are diagonally running ultra-strong steel struts and reinforcements. The A-pillars on each sides of the windshield are high-strength press hardening steels, which are surrounded by hot-rolled and then cold-bent, oval-shaped steel tubes. The design also uses reinforced rocker panels with increased cross section; underbody reinforcements including X-braces, V-braces and additional brackets; and a reinforced “torsion box” bulkhead behind the rear seats that incorporates the pop-up roll bars. Opel claimed the body of the Cascada was 43% stiffer than the previous generation Astra H TwinTop, and worked in tandem with the HiPer Strut suspension layout.

=== Convertible top ===
The Cascada was designed from the outset as a convertible, with its top module developed and manufactured by Magna Car Top Systems (Magna CTS). After first manually deploying a trunk-mounted cargo-divider, the soft top can be electro-hydraulically raised or lowered at speeds up to 50 kilometres per hour (31 mph) by a control located between the two front seats. The top includes the automated operation of an articulating rigid tonneau cover that fully conceals the top when lowered—and uses a heated glass rear window flush with the roof fabric. The frameless windows lower slightly on opening the doors or operating the convertible top.

The cloth-faced top itself is double-layered for thermal and acoustic insulation, with an available triple-layered premium top featuring heavier layers and an additional polyester fleece layer for improved thermal and acoustic insulation. Offered in black, tan, brown and burgundy (marketed respectively as Ebony, Sahara, Sweet Mocha and Malbec), availability varies by model year and trim level.

Tested through 15,000 cycles, top operation requires the key be in accessory or on position and requires the driver to hold the top switch until a chime signals completion of the lowering (17 second) or raising (19 second) cycle. When stationary, the roof can be opened and closed via an optional remote control button on the key fob. As an option, side windows can be raised, lowered and locked via a single four-window switch.

The top was engineered to be weatherproof under extreme conditions. Each Cascada is individually tested in specialized water test booths at the end of the production line, each booth using 124 individual nozzles subjecting the car to 1.9 gallons of water per minute for ten minutes, equal to 1.23 inches of rain per minute.

In the event of imminent rollover, pyrotechnically activated, spring-loaded rollover protection bars—connected to the vehicle's airbag system—deploy behind rear seats, raising 14" to the height of the windshield.

When the rear seats are unoccupied, a large foldable windbreaker can be manually mounted behind the front seats, anchored into recesses in the rear side trim. The upper section of the windbreaker can be raised vertically to deflect wind, while the horizontal section remains fixed. With rear passengers aboard, a smaller windbreaker can be mounted between the rear head-rests to reduce drafts. Each windbreaker comes in its own bag, storable in the trunk.

== Suspension ==
The Cascada uses suspension systems similar to its Delta II platform siblings, the Cadillac ELR and Opel Astra GTC.

The front suspension, marketed as HiPer Strut, reduces the kingpin inclination angle and shortens the kingpin offset compared to a MacPherson strut design—helping to prevent torque steer, increase front axle grip during cornering, and optimize tire contact with the road. The design reduces unwanted steering system disturbances over bumps and on rough roads and allows the Cascada to employ 20" tires.

The rear suspension, for packaging efficiency and lower cost compared to a fully independent suspsension, uses a semi-independent twist beam (or torsion beam) rear suspension with a Watt's linkage, marketed as a compound crank system with Watt's Z-link. The torsion beam itself is a U-shaped, doubled-walled profile attached to trailing links via a 'magnetic-arc' welding process—which uses magnetic forces to drive the components together for welding while allowing the beam's thickness and attachment angles to be varied according to different engine and vehicle weights.

The Watt's linkage centers the car's rear axle during turns and provides increased lateral stiffness during turns, to help keep the rear suspension aligned with the front suspension. On straightaways, the linkage allows the suspension to freely travel vertically while continuing to locate the suspension laterally. The Watt's linkage is carried on a small cross-member attached to the underside of the car, just behind the rear-wheel center line. It comprises a short, pivoting center link with a ball joint at each end, to which the lateral links from the wheels are bolted.

== Engines ==
The Cascada in all its variants primarily used the turbocharged 1.6 litre four cylinder Medium Gasoline Engine with Spark Ignition Direct Injection technology, which reduces fuel consumption. In the Cascada, it achieves a 0 to 60 mph time in the 8–9 second range.

The only available engine in the Buick Cascada was the 200 PS (147 kW; 197 hp) turbocharged 1.6 litre four cylinder with Spark Ignition Direct Injection technology and variable valve timing. The Holden Cascada was only available with the 170 PS (125 kW; 168 hp) version.

Other engines include two 1.4 L Family 0 petrol, with 120 PS (88 kW) and 140 PS (103 kW), both with 200 Nm (220 Nm with overboost) torque; and a 2.0 L CDTI diesel with 165 PS (121 kW) and 380 N⋅m (280 lbf⋅ft) torque.

Petrol engine
| Model | Engine | Displacement | Power | Torque | Note | CO_{2} emission (g/km) | Years |
|---|---|---|---|---|---|---|---|
| 1.4 Turbo VVT | I4 | 1364 cc | 120 PS (88 kW; 118 hp) at 4200 rpm | 200 N⋅m (148 lb⋅ft) at 1850-4200 rpm | N/A in United Kingdom | 153 | 2013–2019 |
| 1.4 Turbo VVT | I4 | 1364 cc | 140 PS (103 kW; 138 hp) at 4900 rpm | 200 N⋅m (148 lb⋅ft) at 1850-4900 rpm | | 148 | 2013–2019 |
| 1.6 Turbo SIDI | I4 | 1598 cc | 170 PS (125 kW; 168 hp) at 6000 rpm | 260 N⋅m (192 lb⋅ft) (overboost 280 (207)) at 1650-4250 rpm | | 148 | 2013–2019 |
| 1.6 Turbo SIDI | I4 | 1598 cc | 200 PS (147 kW; 197 hp) at 5500 rpm | 280 N⋅m (207 lb⋅ft) (overboost 300 (221)) at 1650-3500 rpm | | 158 | 2014–2019 |
Diesel engine
| Model | Engine | Displacement | Power | Torque | Note | CO_{2} emission (g/km) | Years |
| 2.0 CDTI | I4 | 1956 cc | 165 PS (121 kW; 163 hp) at 4000 rpm | 350 N⋅m (258 lb⋅ft) at 1750–2500 rpm | | 138 | 2013–2019 |
| 2.0 CDTI BiTurbo | I4 | 1956 cc | 195 PS (143 kW; 192 hp) at 4000 rpm | 400 N⋅m (295 lb⋅ft) at 1750–2500 rpm | | 138 | 2014–2019 |
