= Mark Adams (designer) =

English car designer

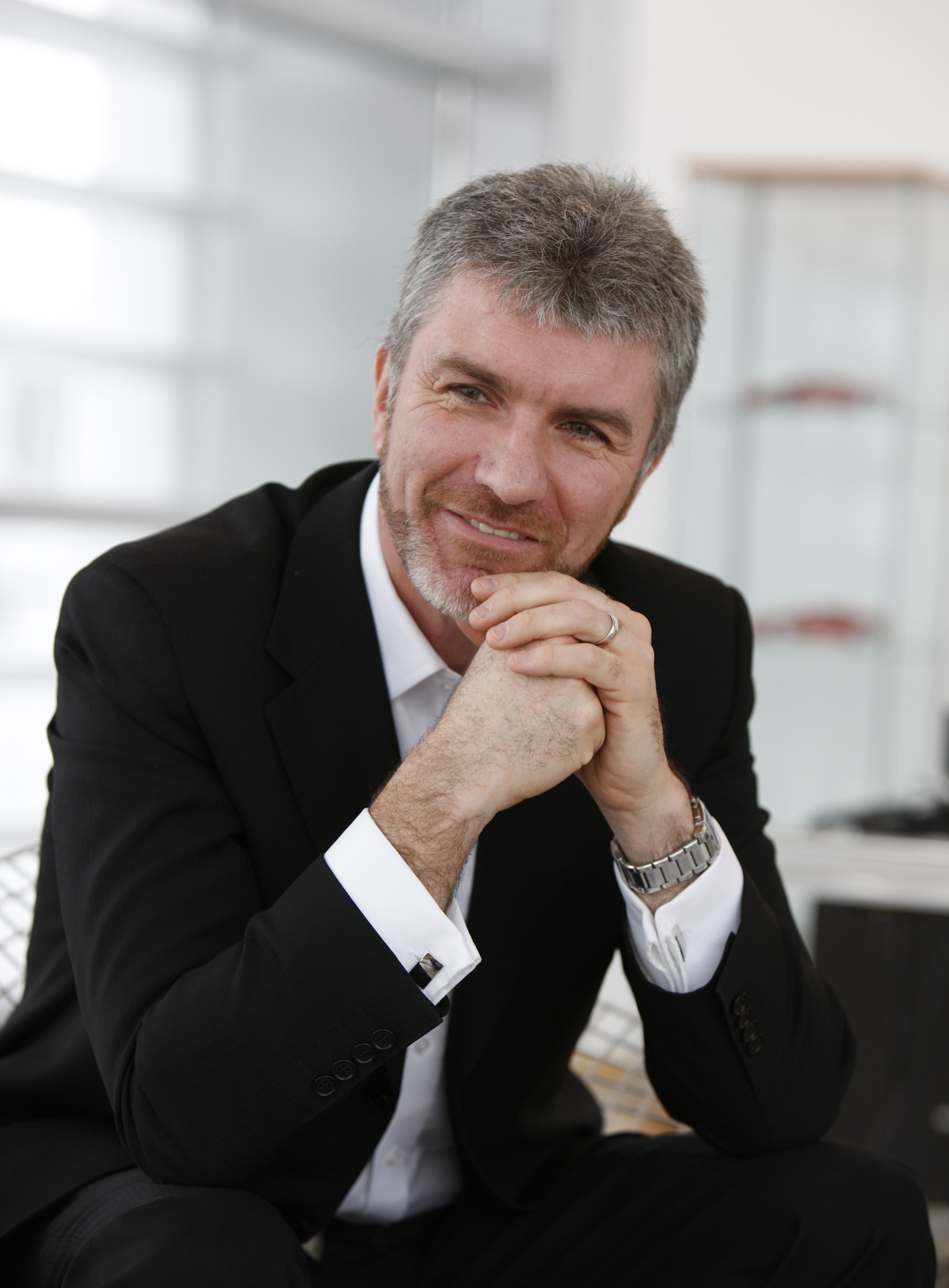
- Adams in 2009
- Born: 11 December 1961 (age 64); London, England
- Education: Royal College of Art
- Occupation: Car designer
- Employer: Opel Automobile

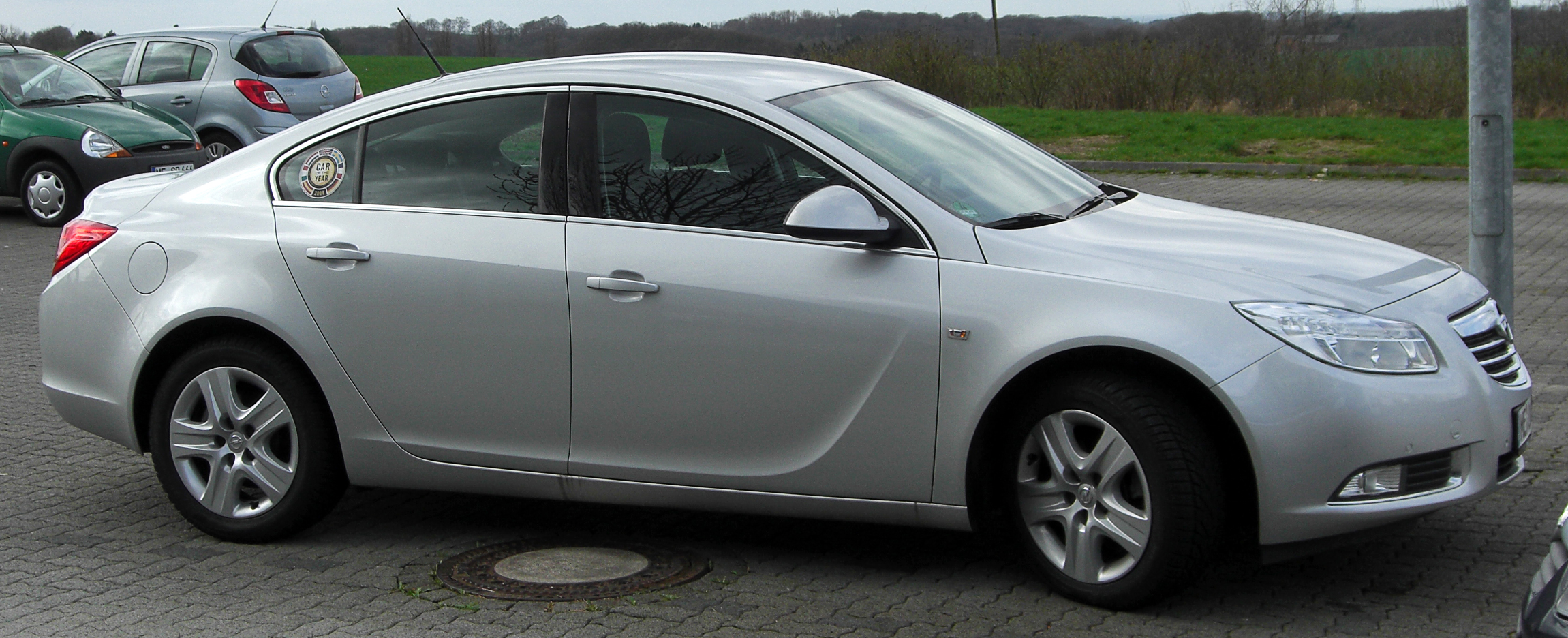
Opel Insignia A / Mk I

Mark Adams (born 11 December 1961) is an English car designer. He is current senior car designer at Opel Automobile and has worked as for brands including Cadillac, Buick and Opel.

== Career ==
Adams was born, in London. He studied both engineering and design and has a master's degree in automotive design from the Royal College of Art in London.

Adams started his career with Ford.

Adams joined GM's former German brand Opel in 2002 as the newly created Director of Exterior Design role, responsible for exterior design of all Opel vehicles. He was appointed Vice President GM Europe Design in June 2007 where he created the consolidated GM Europe Design Center in Rüsselsheim, Germany and was responsible for designing cars across GM's Opel, Saab and Saturn marques.

In August 2012 he became executive director of design for Cadillac and Buick in the US.

In August 2013 Adams returned to Europe to work with Opel to develop better links between the German marque and Buick.

== Design work ==
- Ford Motor Company
  - Ford Fiesta Mk V
  - Ford Fusion (Europe)
- Opel
  - Opel Ampera
  - Opel GTC Concept
  - Opel Cascada
  - Opel Insignia Concept
  - Opel Insignia A / Mk I
  - Opel Insignia B / Mk II
  - Opel Karl
  - Opel Meriva B
  - Opel Monza Concept
  - Opel Zafira Tourer Concept
- Cadillac
  - Cadillac CTS saloon/sedan
