= Roewe RX8 =

Chinese mid-size SUV

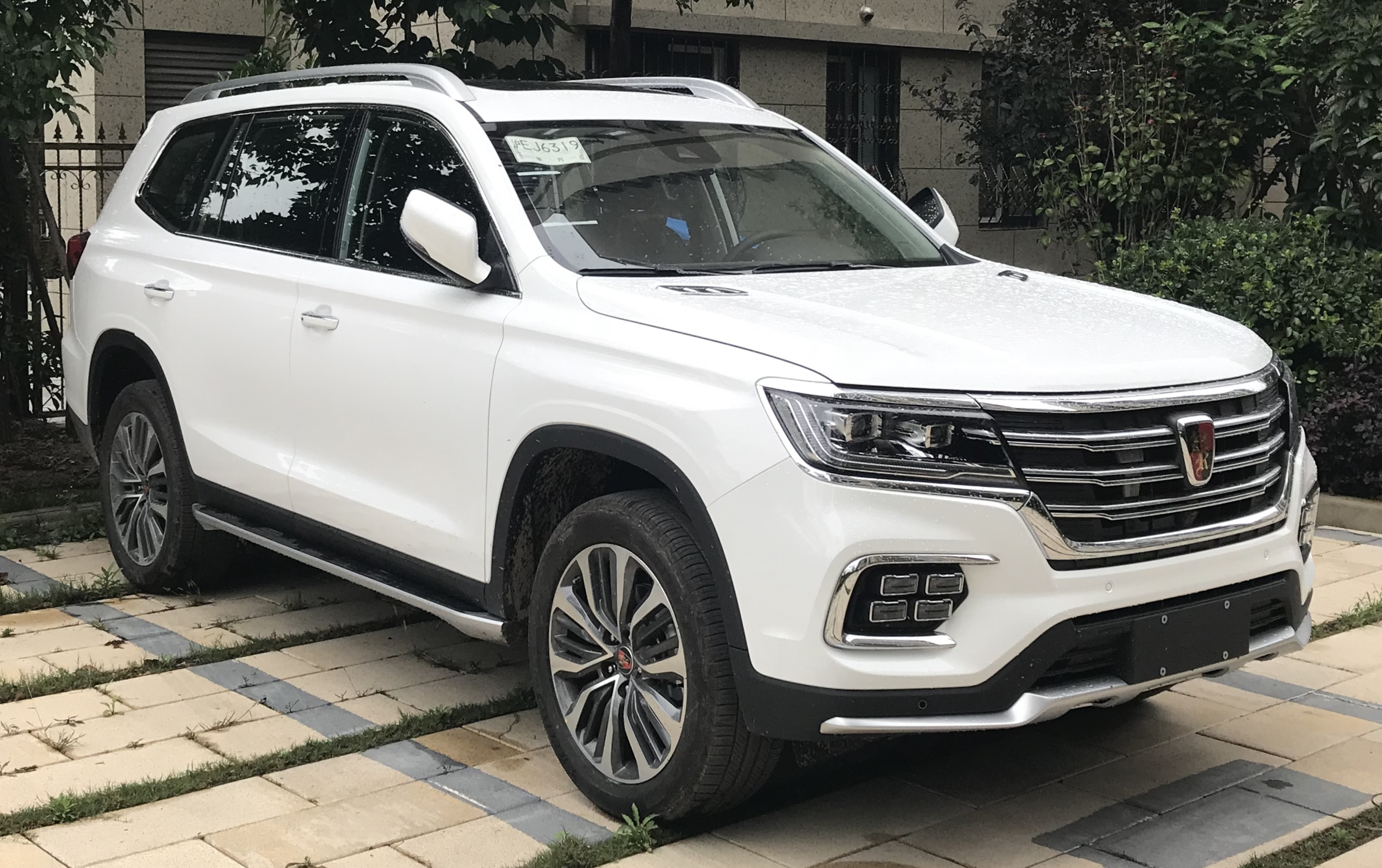

Overview
- Manufacturer: SAIC Motor
- Model code: IS21
- Also called: MG RX8
- Production: 2018–2023; 2019–present (export)

Body and chassis
- Class: Mid-size SUV
- Body style: 5-door SUV
- Layout: Front-engine, rear-wheel-drive; Front-engine, four-wheel-drive
- Chassis: Body-on-frame
- Related: Maxus D90

Powertrain
- Engine: 2.0 L 20L4E turbo I4
- Transmission: 6-speed automatic

Dimensions
- Wheelbase: 2,850 mm (112.2 in)
- Length: 4,923 mm (193.8 in)
- Width: 1,930 mm (76.0 in)
- Height: 1,810–1,840 mm (71.3–72.4 in)
- Curb weight: 1,980–2,115 kg (4,365–4,663 lb)

Chronology
- Predecessor: Roewe W5
- Successor: Roewe RX9

The Roewe RX8 is a mid-size SUV produced by SAIC Motor. It is the flagship SUV of the brand of Roewe, replacing the Roewe W5. It is also marketed as the MG RX8 in overseas markets.

== Overview ==
The Roewe RX8 debuted in April 2018 at the Beijing Auto Show. The Roewe RX8 comes in five and seven seat variants, and shares a shortened, but same body-on-frame platform with the Maxus D90 full size SUV, which is also produced by SAIC Motor.

The engine of the RX8 is a 2.0-litre turbo engine producing 224 horsepower (167 kW; 227 PS) and 360 N⋅m (266 lb⋅ft; 37 kg⋅m) of torque, mated to a 6-speed automatic gearbox, with both the gearbox and engine shared with the Maxus D90 SUV. Base Roewe RX8 models are rear-wheel drive and higher trim levels are all wheel drive.

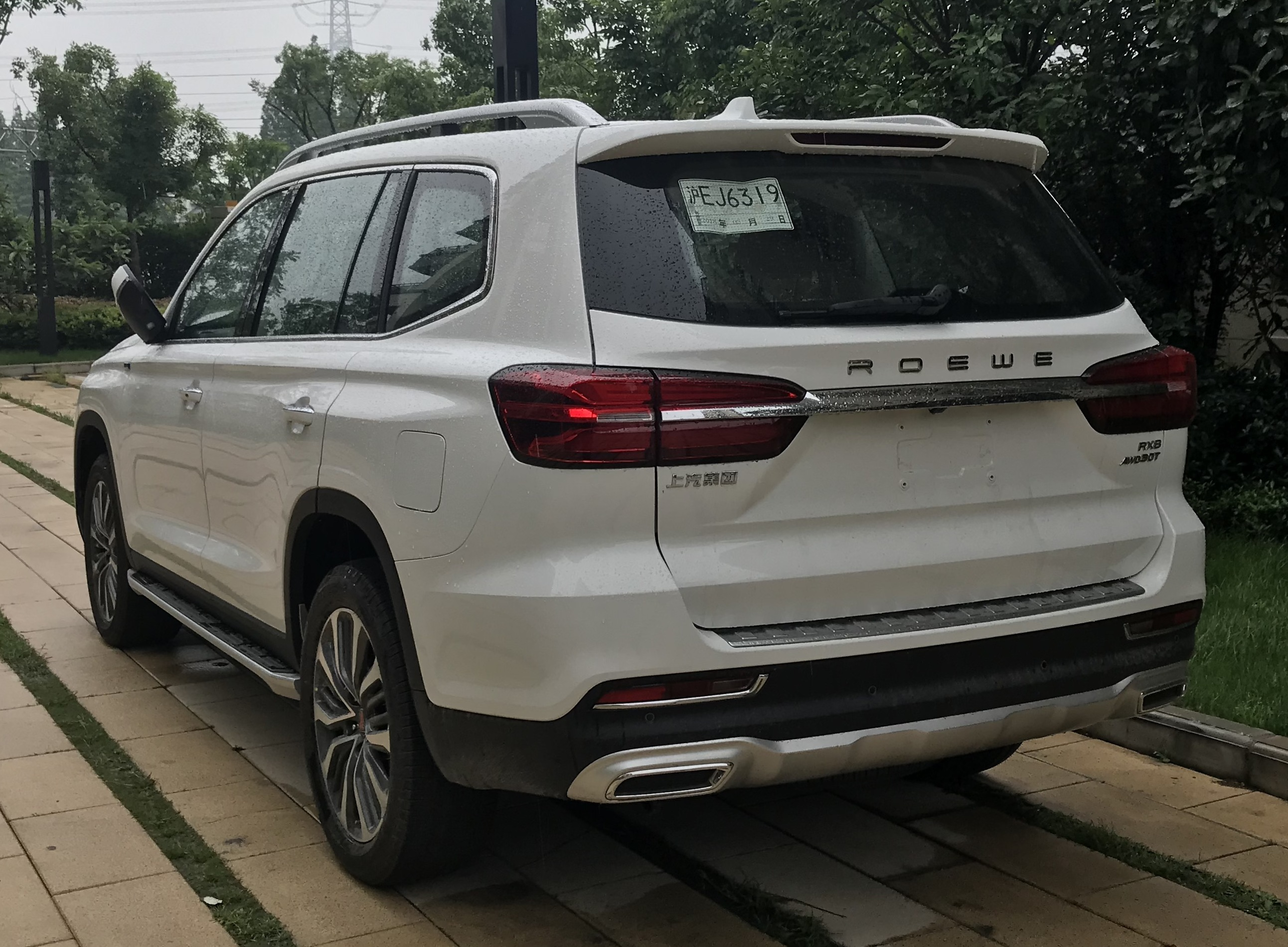
Roewe RX8 (rear)

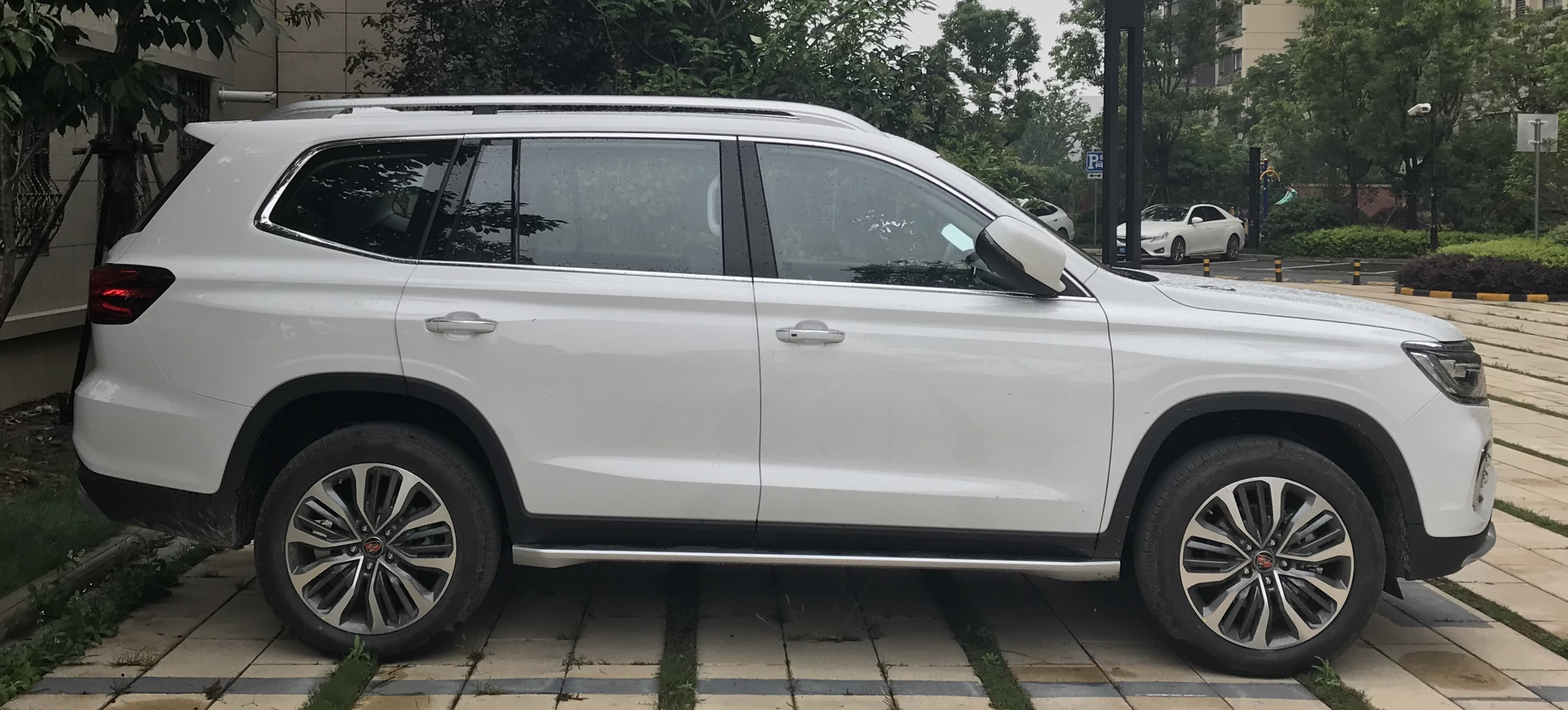
Roewe RX8 (side)

== MG RX8 ==
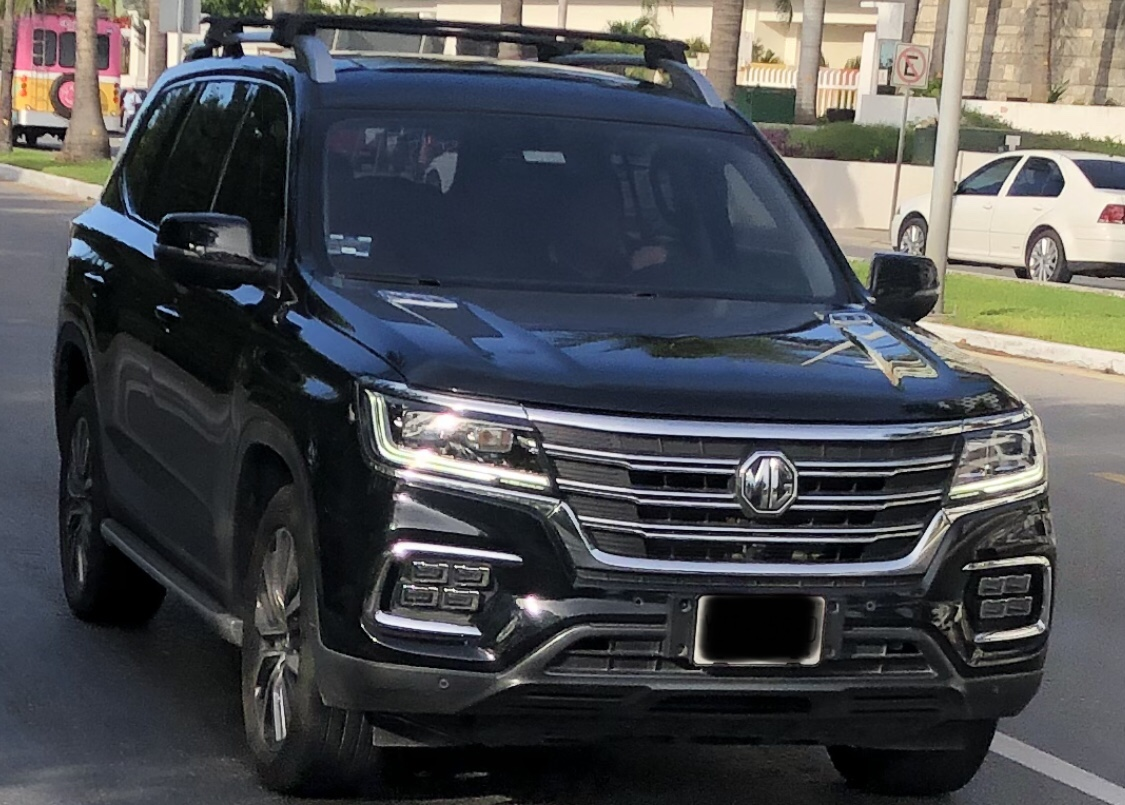
MG RX8 (Mexico)

Launched in September 2019 for the Middle Eastern market, the MG RX8 is a rebadged version of the Roewe RX8. It is powered by the same 2.0-litre turbo petrol engine shared by the Roewe RX8 and Maxus D90 mated to a 6-speed automatic transmission producing 224 horsepower (167 kW; 227 PS) of power and 360 N⋅m (266 lb⋅ft; 37 kg⋅m) torque. The MG RX8 features a ground clearance of 202 mm (8.0 in) and a wading depth of 800 mm (31.5 in), combined with a truck-chassis frame. It was also launched for the Mexican market on 27 September 2021 with sales starting on 1 October 2021, only offered in the Elegance trim. A launch edition will also be sold limited to 300 units.

== Powertrain ==
Specs
Model	Years	Layout	Engine	Transmission	Power	Torque	0–100 km/h (0–62 mph) (Official)	Top speed
RX8	2018–present	RWD	2.0L Turbo I4	6-speed automatic	162 kW (220 PS; 217 hp) at 5,500 rpm	360 N⋅m (266 lb⋅ft) at 2,500–3,000 rpm	9.1s	186 km/h (116 mph)
RX8	2018–present	AWD	2.0L Turbo I4	6-speed automatic	162 kW (220 PS; 217 hp) at 5,500 rpm	360 N⋅m (266 lb⋅ft) at 2,500–3,000 rpm	9.9s	186 km/h (116 mph)
