= Opel Movano =

Light commercial vehicle

The Opel Movano, a light commercial vehicle, made its first debut in 1997. It is sold in the United Kingdom as the Vauxhall Movano, which may refer to:

- The first generation Movano A, based on the second generation Renault Master, was produced between 1998 and 2010.
- The second generation Movano B, based on the third generation Renault Master, was produced between 2010 and 2021.
- The third generation Movano C, based on same platform as the third generation Fiat Ducato, is currently produced since 2021.
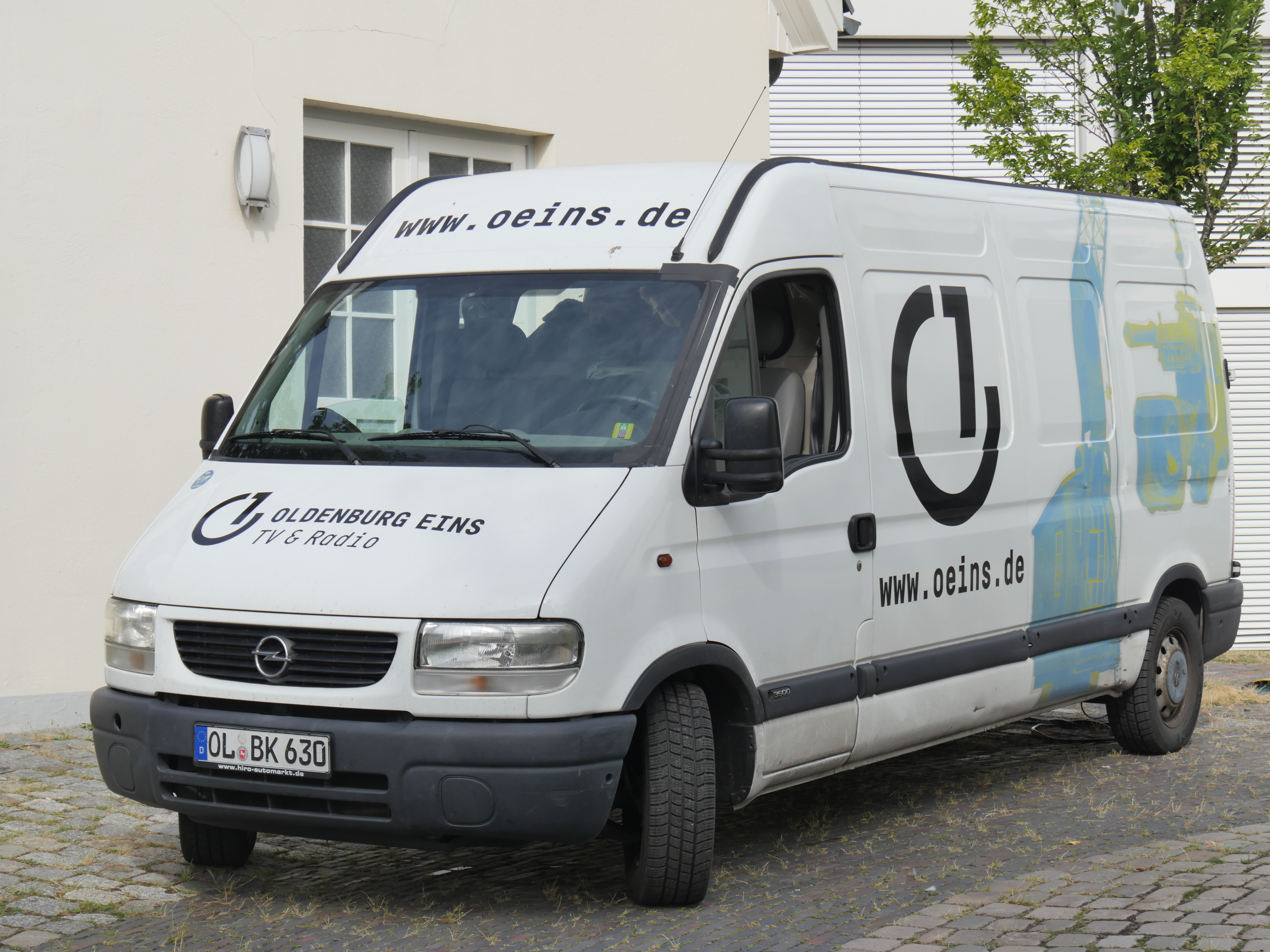
Opel Movano A (pre-facelift)

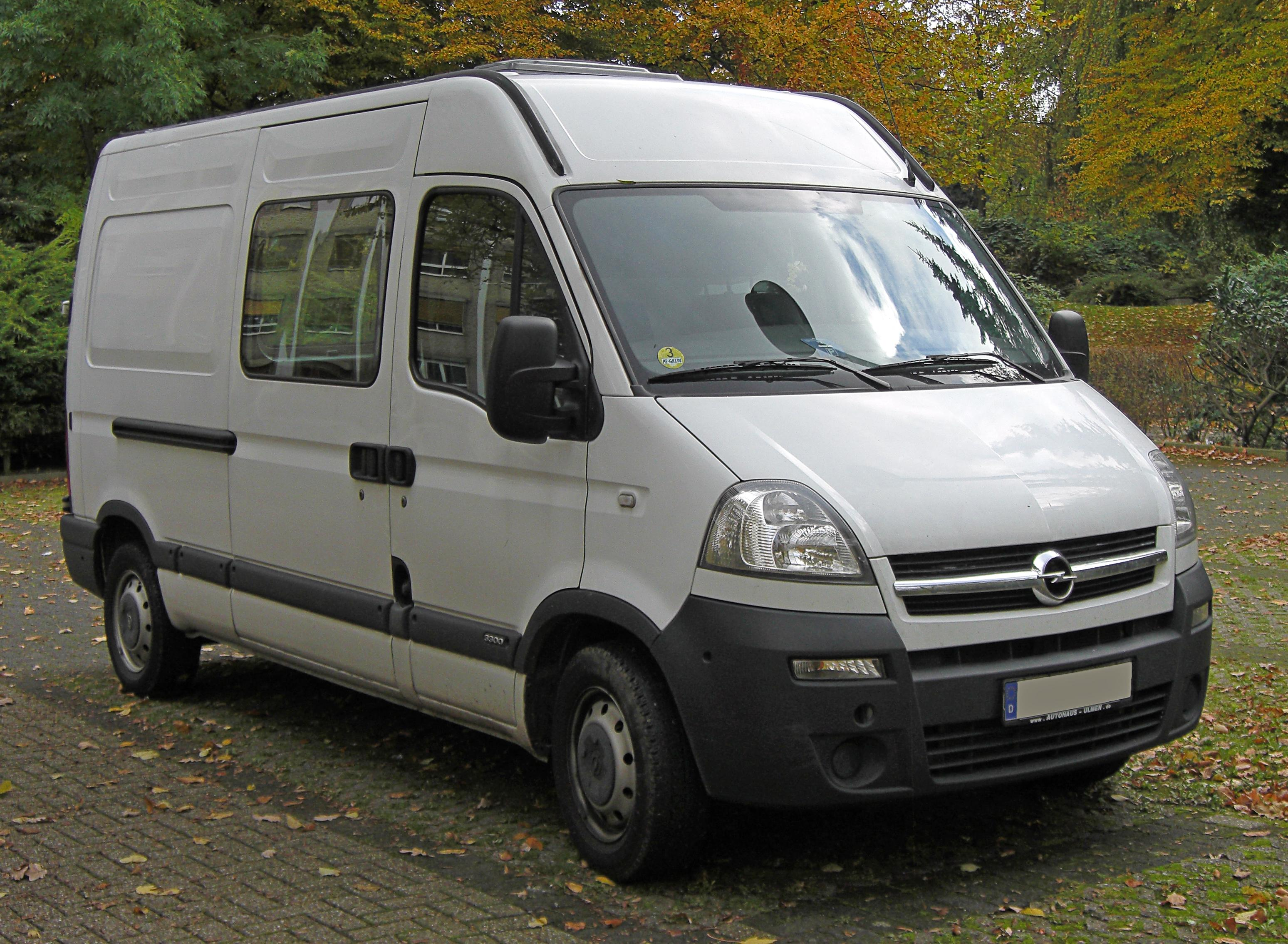
Opel Movano A (facelift)

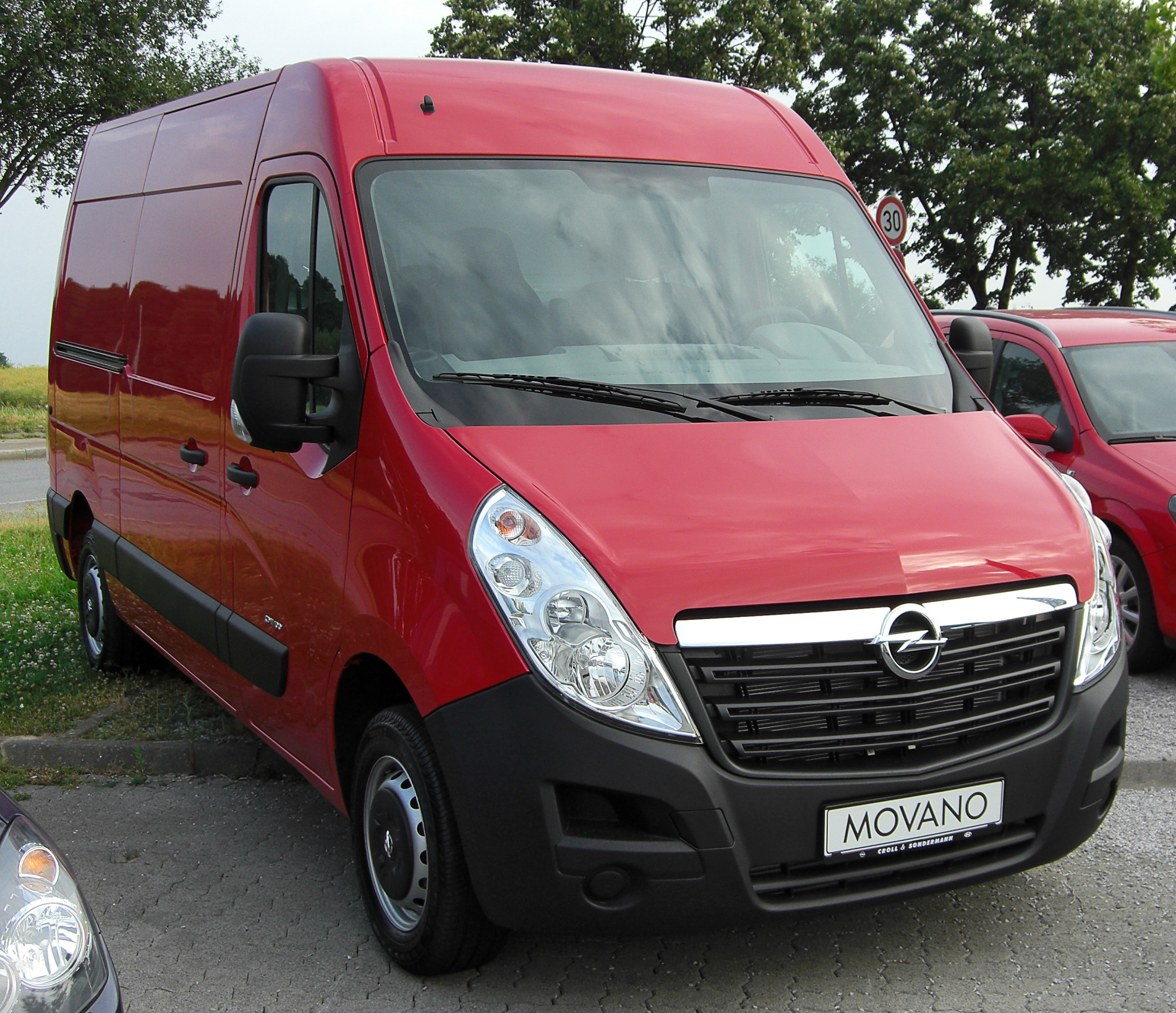
Opel Movano B (built on a Renault Master chassis)

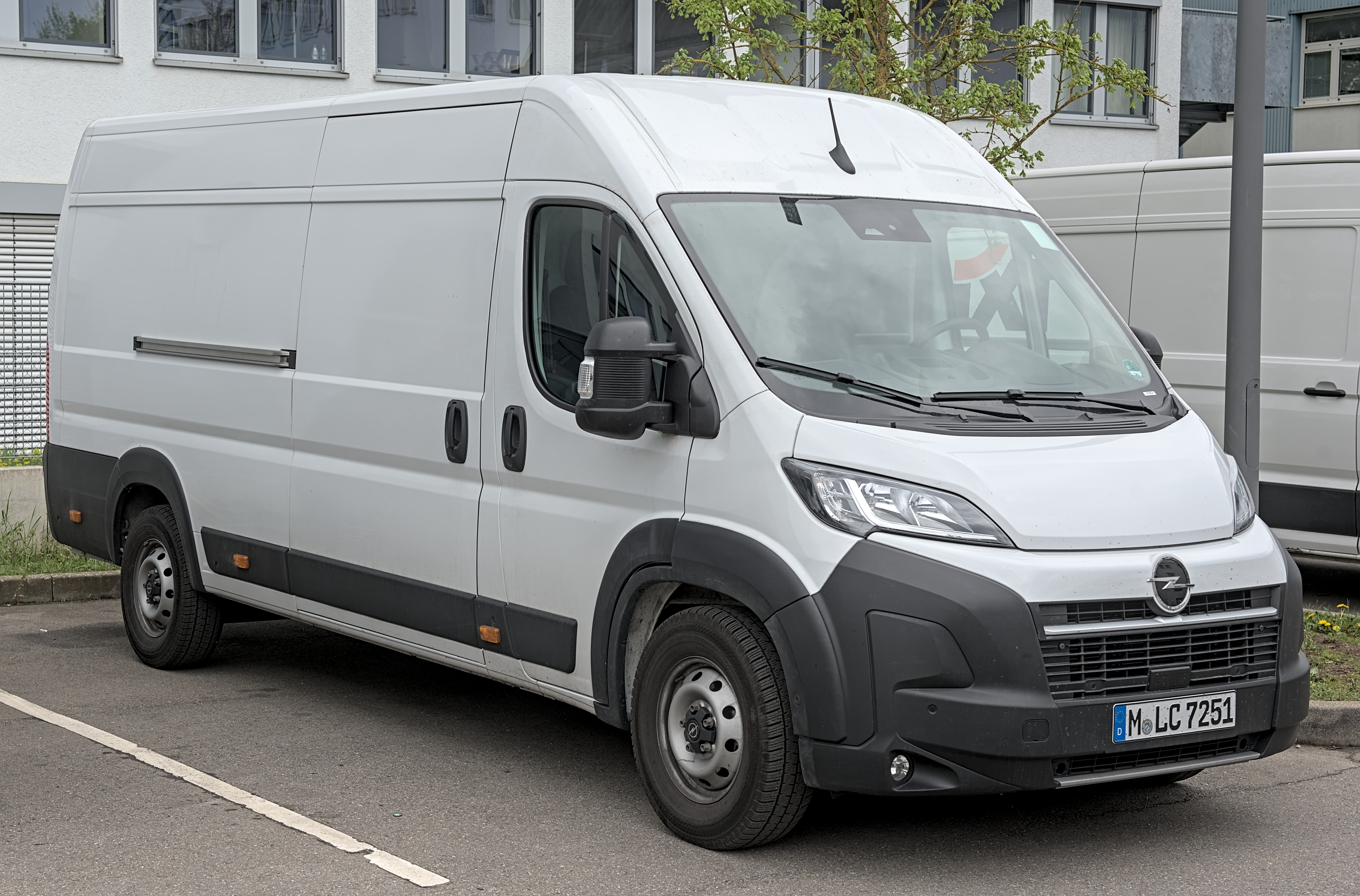
Opel Movano C (built on a Fiat Ducato chassis)
