= Maxus T60 =

Mid-size pickup truck

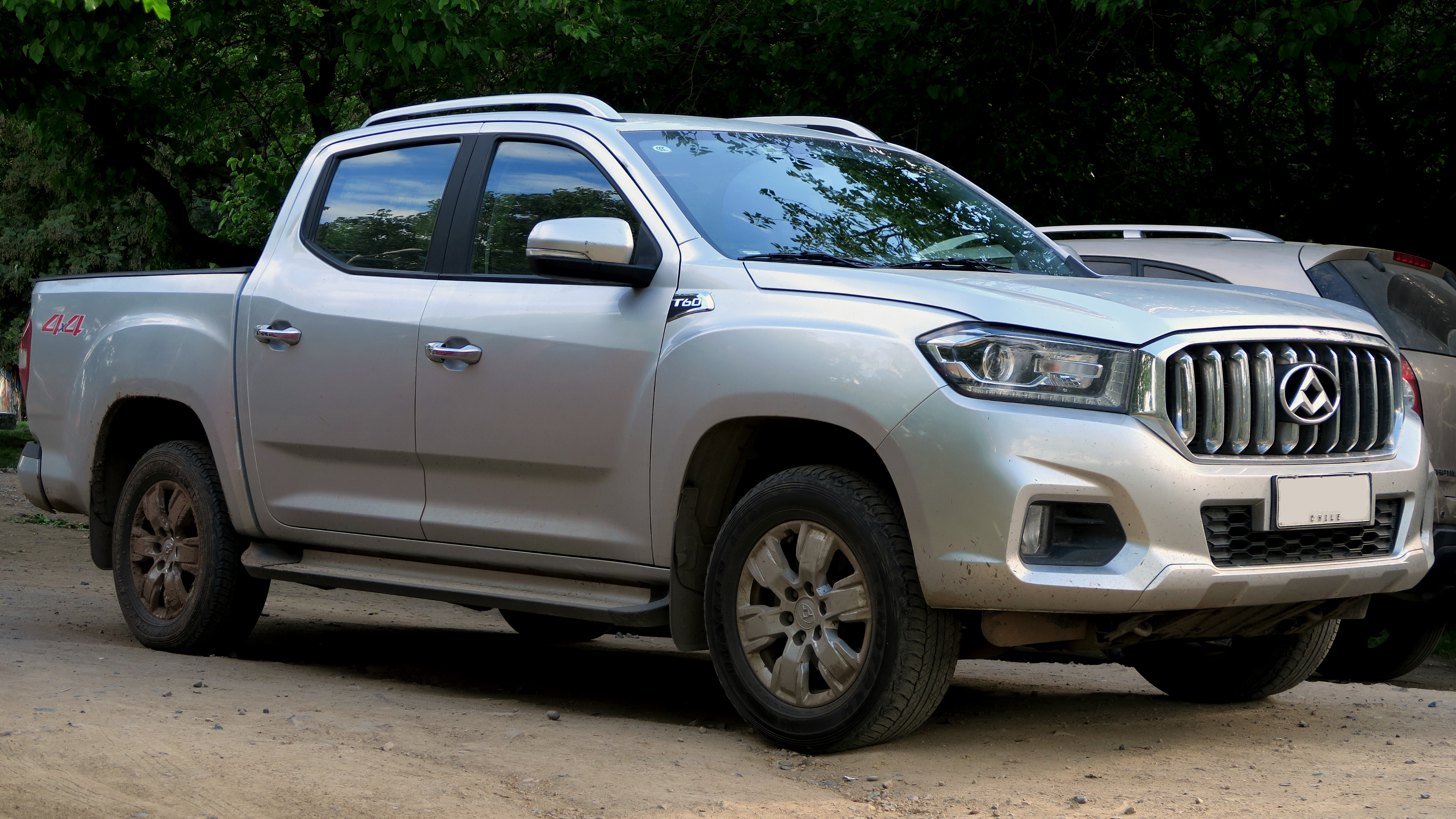

Overview
- Manufacturer: SAIC Motor
- Also called: LDV T60 (Australia and New Zealand); Maxus Interstellar L/R (China, 2023–present); Maxus Tornado 60 (Saudi Arabia); Maxus Tornado 70 Pro (Saudi Arabia); MG TRQ L (Philippines); Maxus T90 (facelift); Chevrolet S10 Max (Mexico); Chevrolet D-Max (Ecuador, since 2025); Maxus T60 D20 (Chile and Paraguay); MG Extender (Thailand, Laos and Pakistan); MG T60 (Middle East)
- Production: 2016–present
- Assembly: China: Wuxi, Jiangsu (SAIC Maxus Wuxi Branch); Thailand: Laem Chabang (SAIC-CP); Malaysia: Kuala Lumpur (Weststar Maxus)

Body and chassis
- Class: Mid-size pickup truck
- Body style: 2-door single cab 2-door extended cab 4-door crew cab 4-door crew cab extended
- Layout: Front-engine, rear-wheel-drive or four-wheel drive Rear-motor, rear-wheel-drive (LDV eT60 2WD EV)
- Platform: Maxus T platform (SK81)
- Related: Maxus D90; Roewe RX8; Maxus T90

Powertrain
- Engine: Petrol: 2.0 L 20L4E turbo I4; 2.4 L 4G69 I4; Diesel: 2.0 L D20 turbo I4; 2.8 L SC28R turbo I4
- Transmission: 5-speed Aisin manual 6-speed DYMOS manual 6-speed SAGW manual 6-speed Punch automatic 1-speed direct-drive (EV)
- Battery: 88.5 kWh (LDV eT60 2WD EV)
- Electric range: WLTP 330 km (205.05 mi) (LDV eT60 2WD EV)
- Plug-in charging: 11 kW AC, 80 kW DC (LDV eT60 2WD EV)

Dimensions
- Wheelbase: 3,155 mm (124.2 in) (short wheelbase); 3,470 mm (136.6 in) (long wheelbase)
- Length: 5,365 mm (211.2 in) (short wheelbase); 5,680 mm (223.6 in) (long wheelbase)
- Width: 1,900 mm (74.8 in)
- Height: 1,722 mm (67.8 in) (low chassis); 1,809 mm (71.2 in)-1,845 mm (72.6 in) (high chassis)
- Curb weight: 1,950–2,060 kg (4,299–4,542 lb) (dual cab); 1,720 kg (3,792 lb) (chassis cab)

Chronology
- Predecessor: Chevrolet D-Max (Ecuador)
- Successor: Maxus T90

The Maxus T60 is a mid-size pickup truck manufactured by SAIC Motor under the Maxus brand since November 2016. It is the first pickup truck from SAIC built for the global market.

In April 2019, an upgraded version called the Maxus T70 was unveiled at the 2019 Auto Shanghai. The T60/T70 is also marketed as the MG Extender in Thailand, Laos and Pakistan, Maxus Tornado 60/70 in Saudi Arabia, Chevrolet S10 Max in Mexico and Chevrolet D-Max in Ecuador.

== Overview ==
The original 2.8-litre T60 debuted at the 2016 Guangzhou International Motor Show in Guangzhou, China. The T60 is the first pickup from SAIC and it is the first Chinese-built pickup truck with 6 airbags. Early test models were equipped with a LFB479Q 1.8L petrol engine coupled with a 5-speed manual transmission, as stated by SAIC to the Chinese Ministry of Industry and Information Technology. The T60 was one of the first SAIC vehicles to be sold under the consumer-to-business (C2B) model, with the customer having the possibility to fully customize the truck on the Maxus website before buying it.

On June 12, 2017, the first batch of 300 T60 pickups were exported to Chile.

Due to government emission regulations, all T60 models from 2020 that are on sale in China are powered by the new 2.0 Euro 6 SAIC-GM Phi diesel engine, and are called "Pioneer edition".

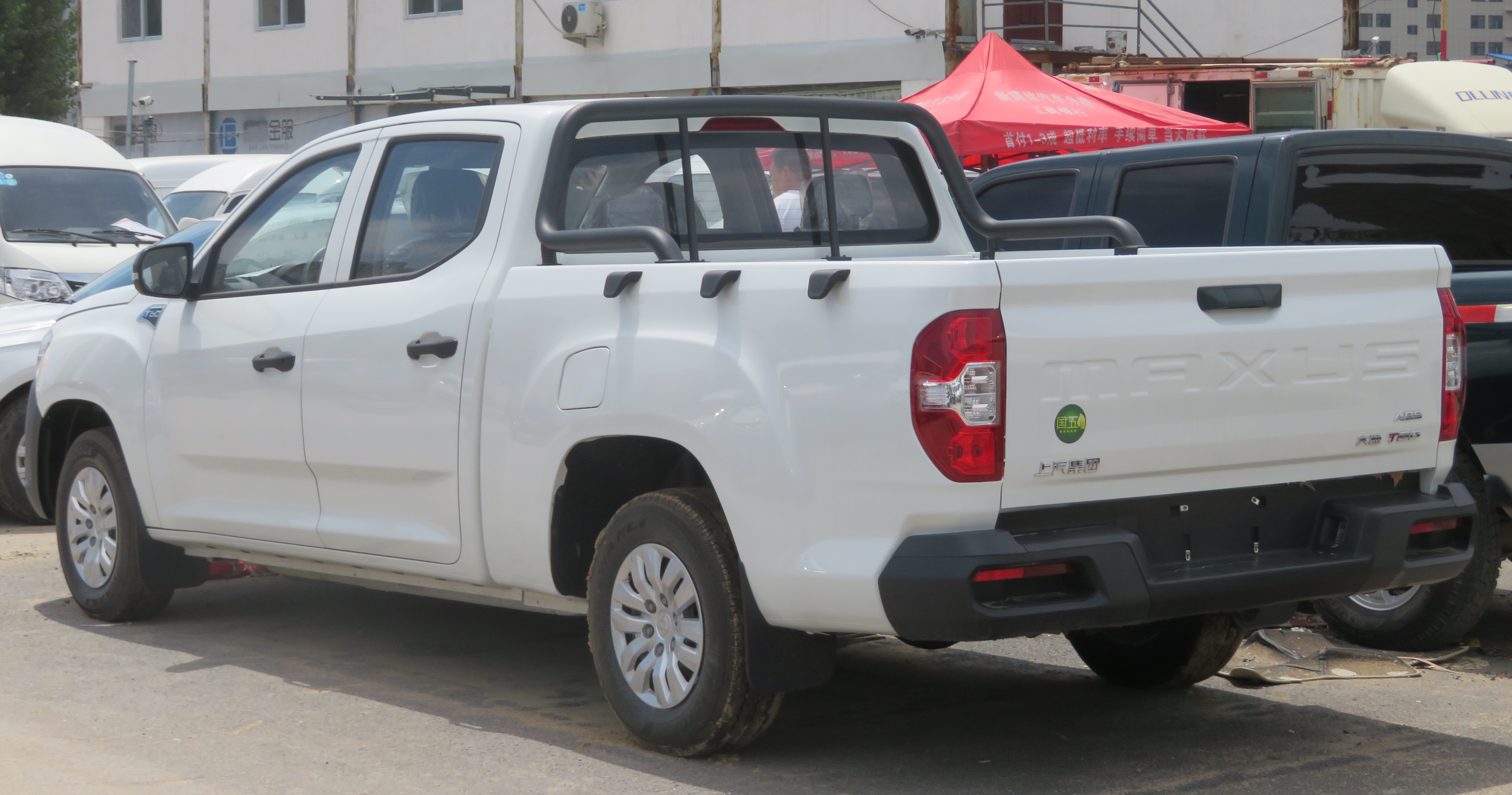
T60 dual cab extended rear

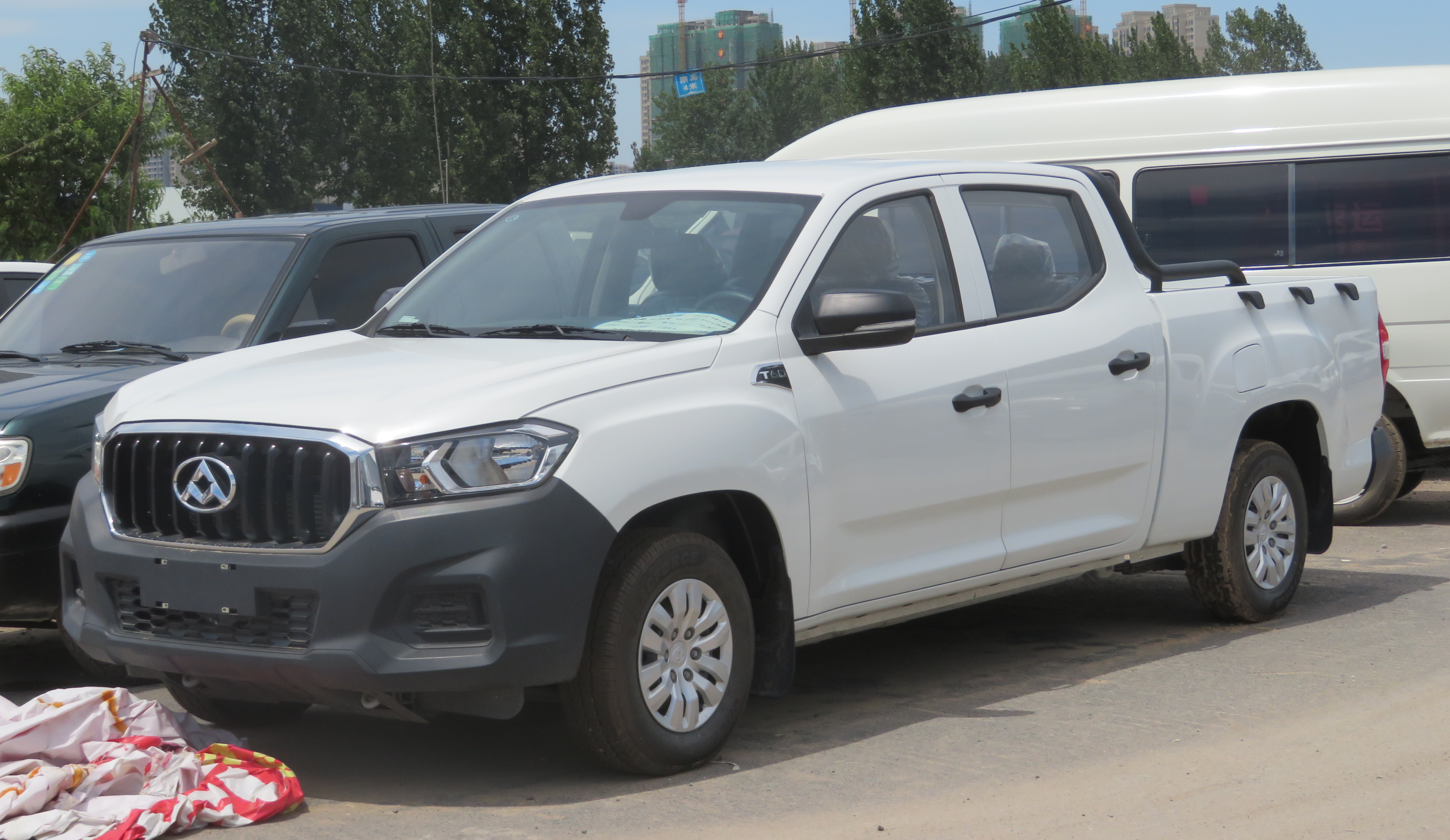
T60 dual cab extended front

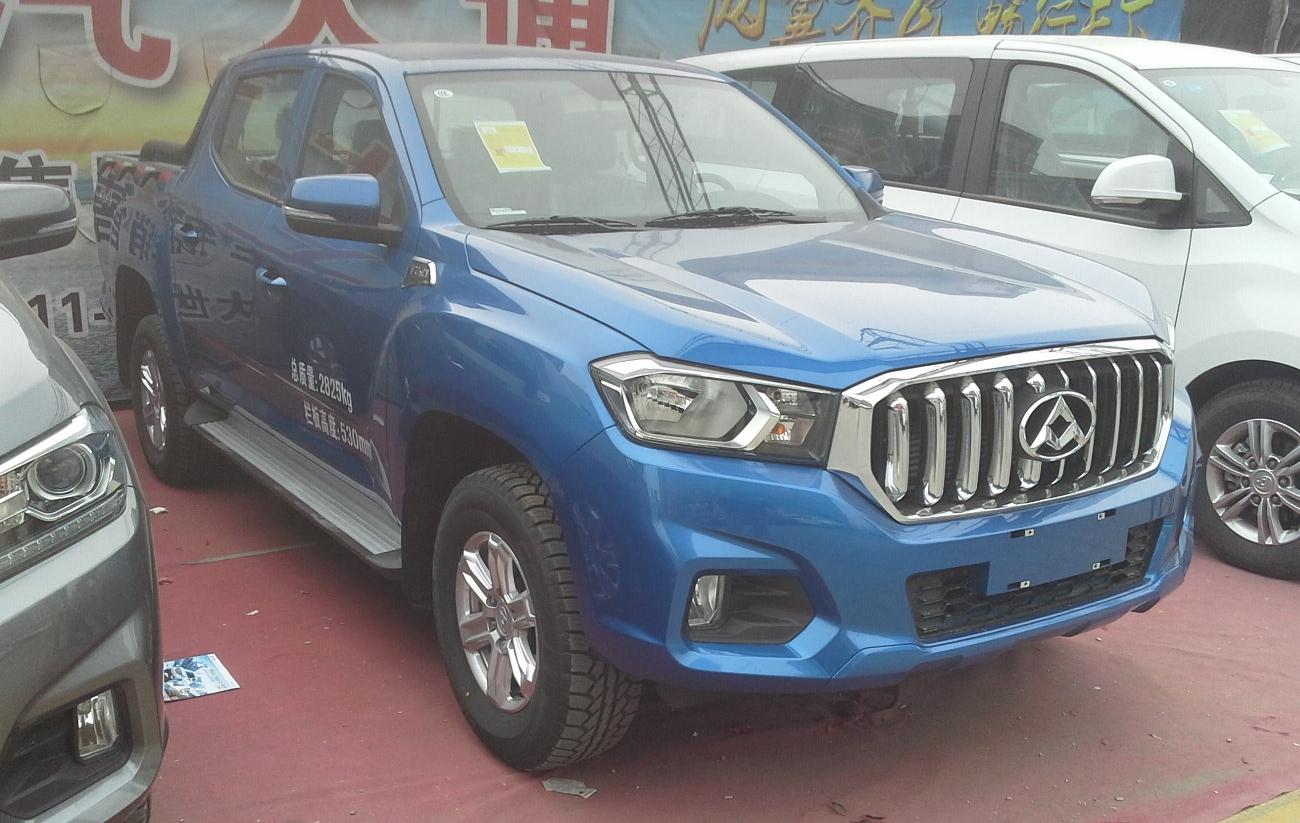
T60 on display in Yinchuan, Ningxia province, China.

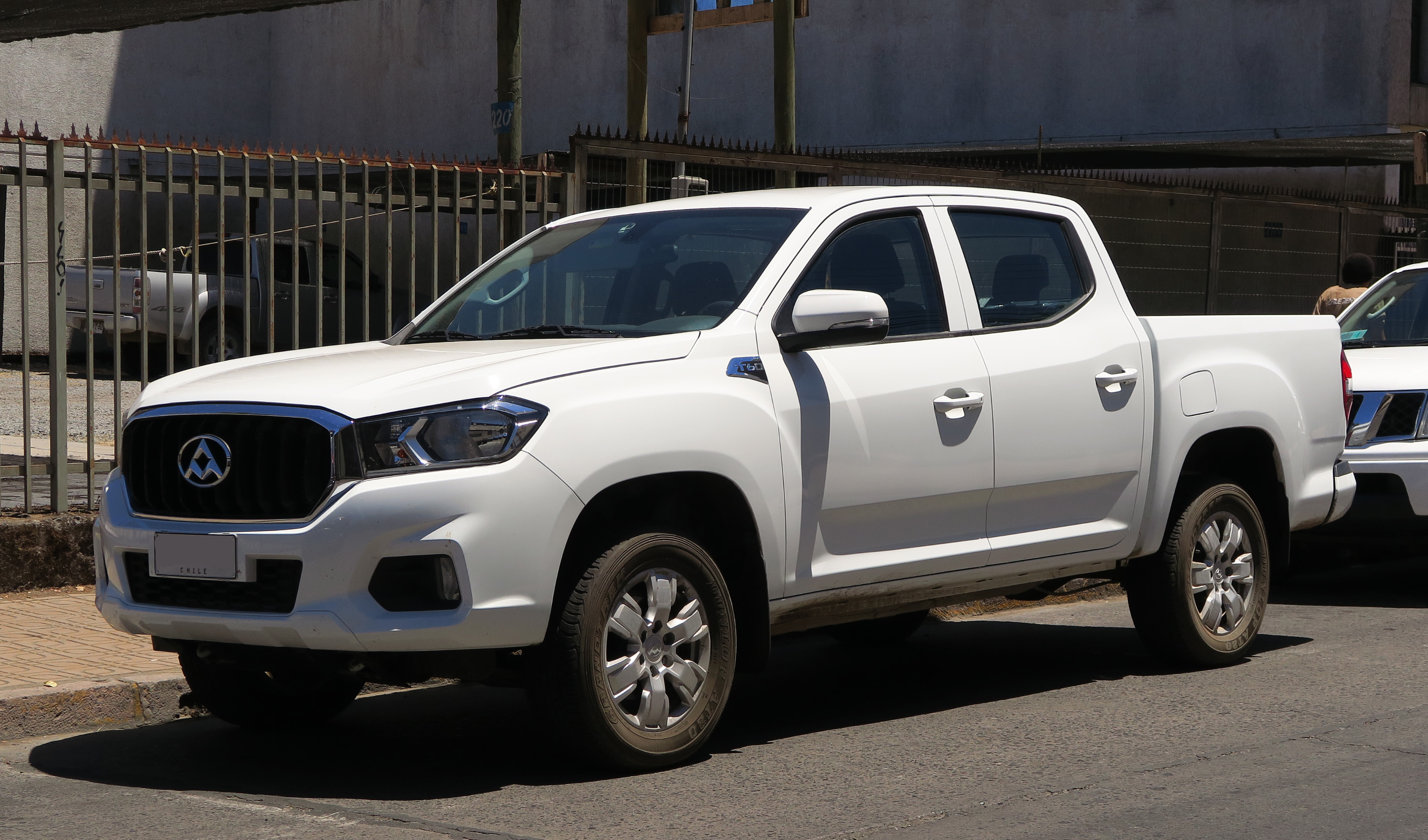
T60 2.8 GL (Chile)

T60 Max

European model

== Maxus T70 ==
At the 2019 Auto Shanghai, SAIC Maxus introduced a new pickup truck, the Maxus T70. The truck, as presented at the 2019 Auto Shanghai, is based on the "T60 Cross" model of the T60, as both trucks have identical paint kit and similar accessories. The T70 is the first Maxus pickup to include the new SAIC-GM π engine that will be used in all new Maxus vehicles.

The T70 is sold as "Maxus Tornado 70 Pro" in Saudi Arabia, with a unique front grille.

In July 2020, the Maxus NEW Concept pickup truck was unveiled at the Chengdu Auto Show, intended as a test-bed for the successor of the T70.

The T70 is powered by either a 160 kW (218 PS; 215 bhp), 350 N⋅m (260 lbf⋅ft) twin-turbo or 120 kW (163 PS; 161 bhp), 375 N⋅m (277 lbf⋅ft) single turbo 2.0 litre "SAIC π" Euro 6b diesel engine, developed jointly with GM and manufactured by SDEC. A six-speed automatic is paired with both engines. The T70 is the first Maxus truck with an electronic power steering system.

The T70 includes a larger set of wheels (17-inch 6x130 Maxus "Tomahawk") and 255/55R19 Continental ContiSportContact high performance tires, front guard bars, integrated roll cage, rear trailer bar, two-color interior and new Raptor-style front grille with "MAXUS" lettering.

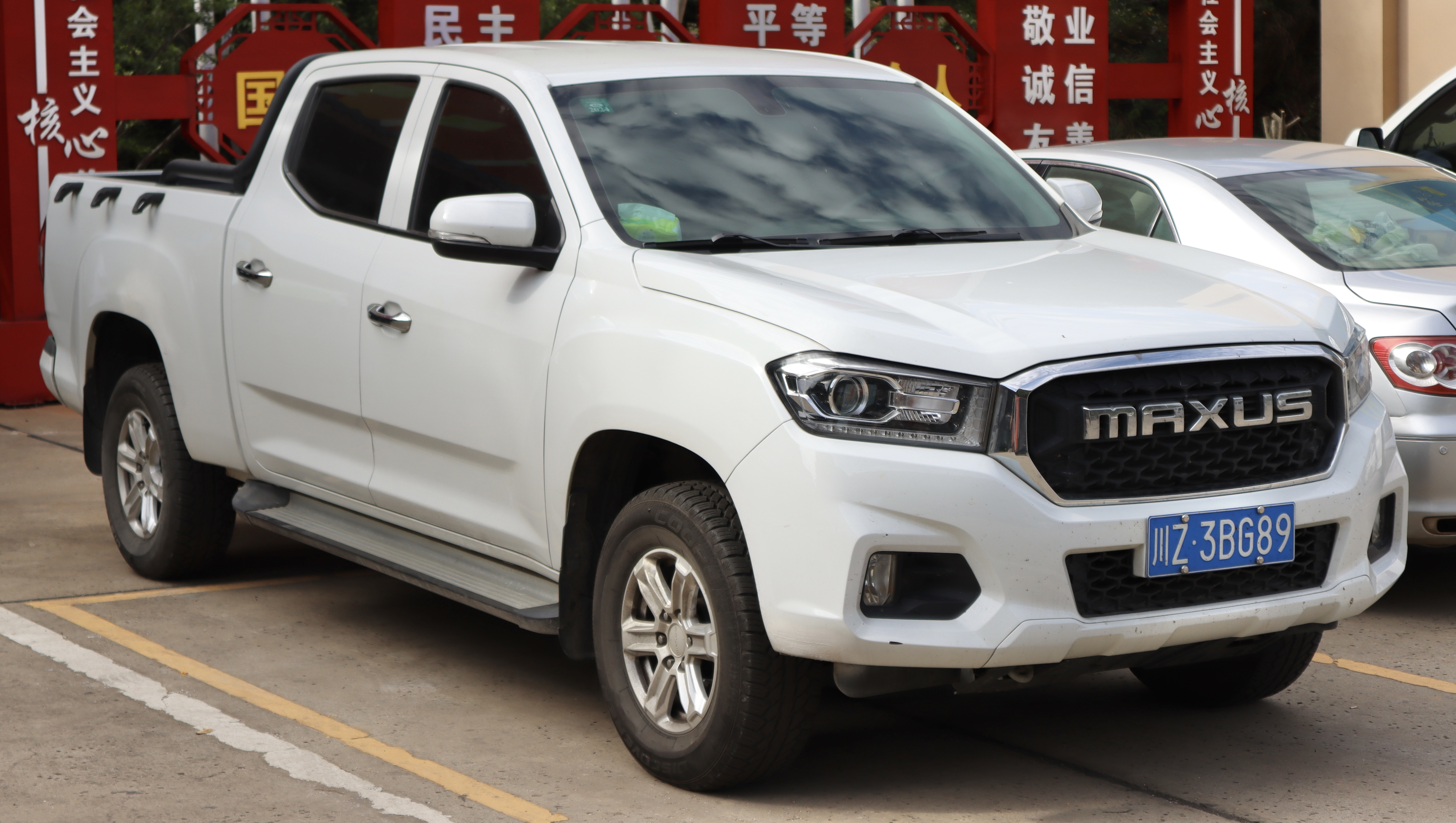
Maxus T70

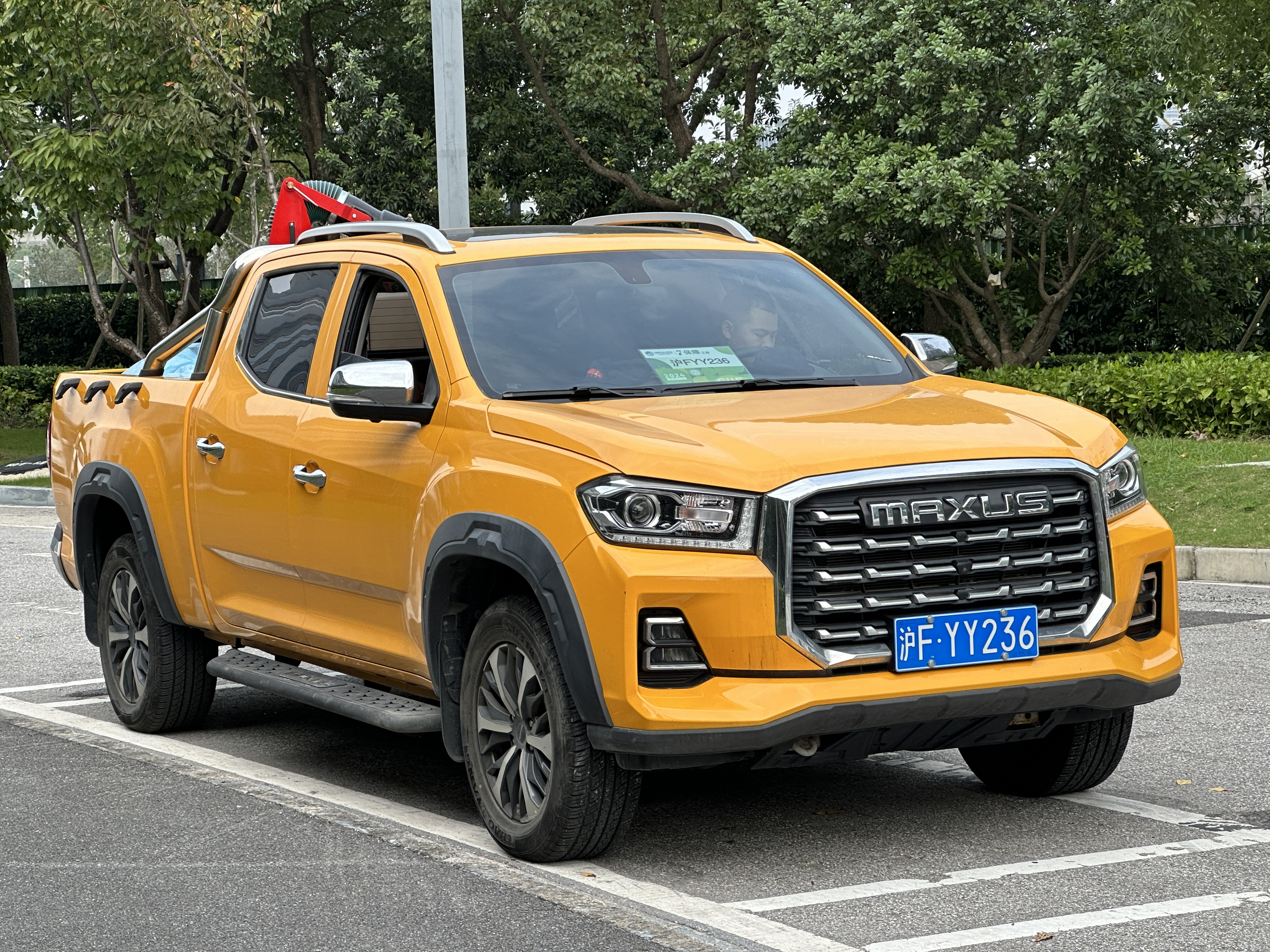
2023 Maxus T70 facelift

== MG Extender ==
The MG Extender a rebadged version of the T70 assembled in Thailand by SAIC-CP since 2019. Besides replacing the badges, the changes MG made to the T70 is a reworked grille and wheel design. It received a facelift in 2021 based on the T90.

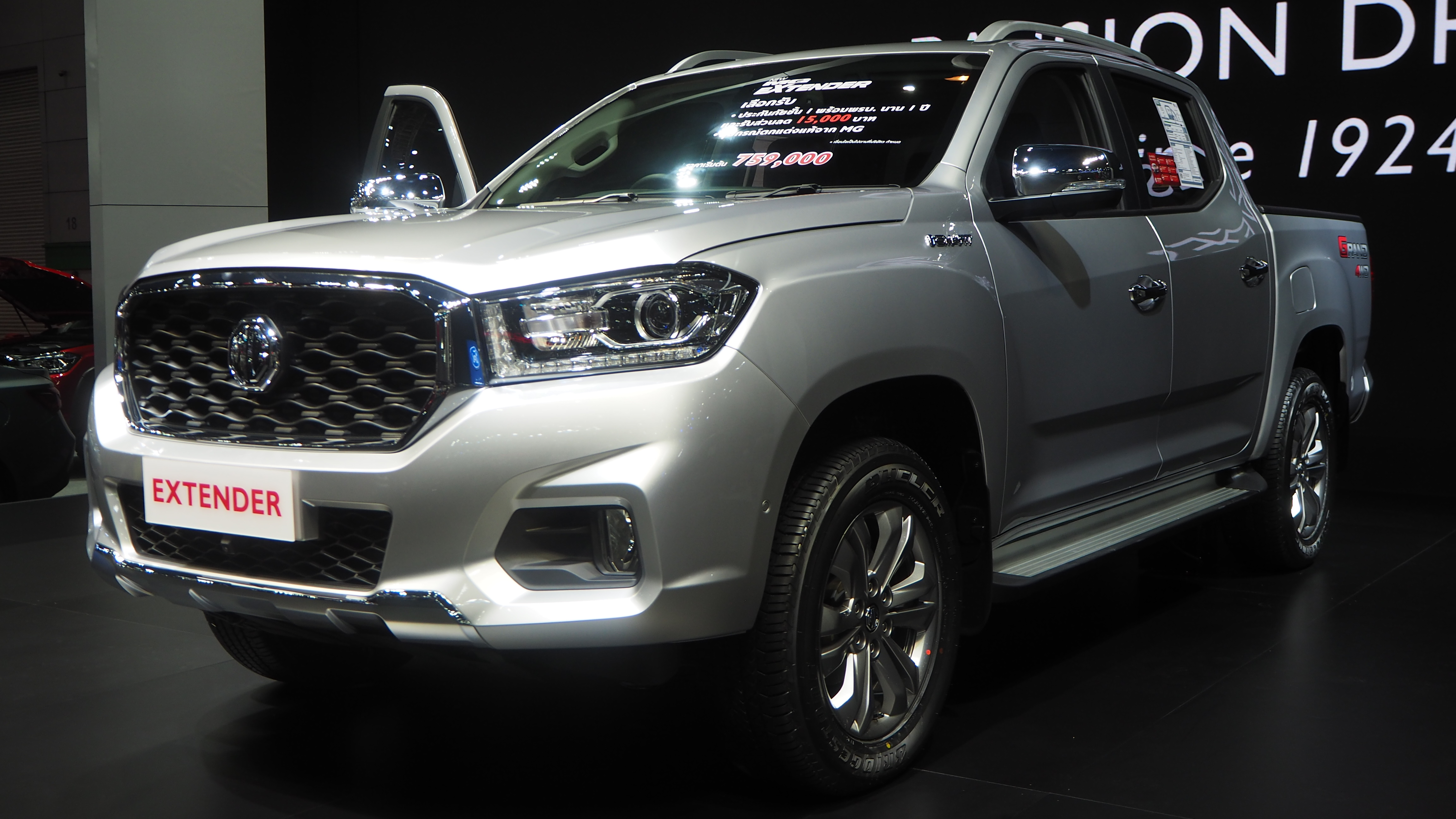
2019 MG Extender DC 2.0X Grand 4WD

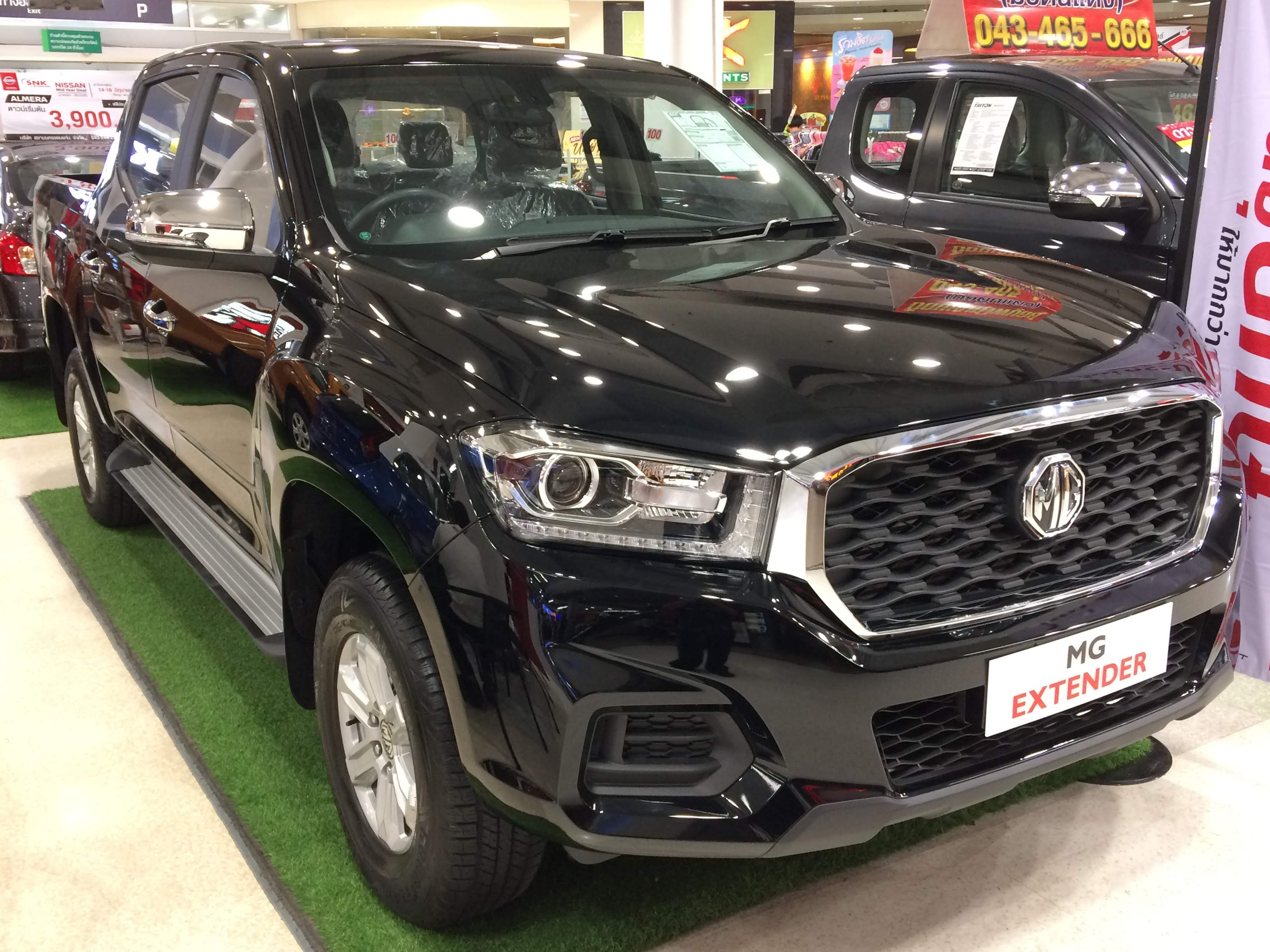
2020 MG Extender DC 2.0D Grand

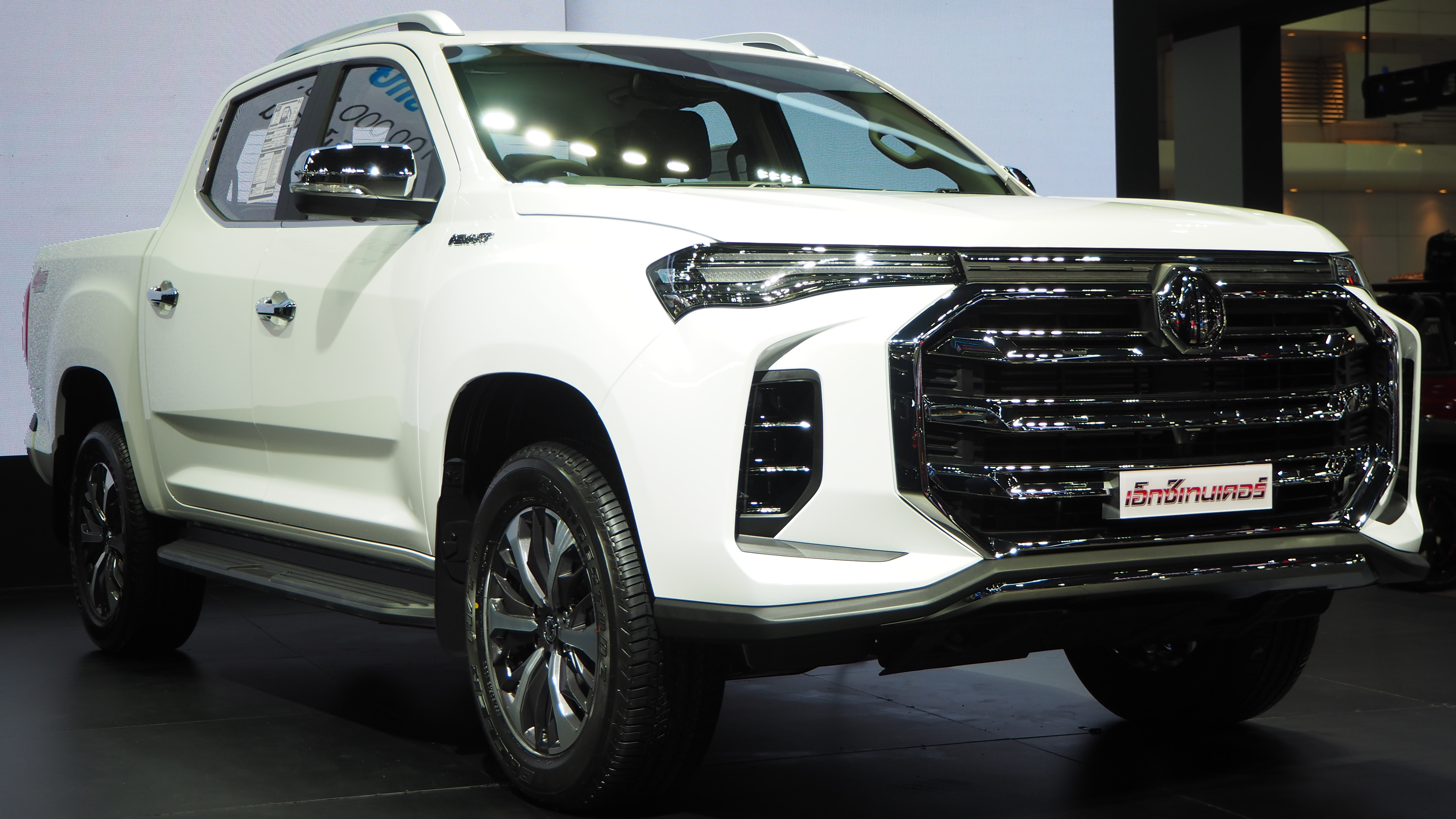
2021 MG Extender DC 2.0X Grand 4WD (facelift)

== Chevrolet S10 Max / Chevrolet D-Max ==
In late 2021, General Motors introduced the Maxus T60 as the Chevrolet S10 Max for the Mexican market, powered by the 2.0 20L4E or 2.4 4G69S4N engine.

Since March 2025, the T60 is sold as the Chevrolet D-Max for the Ecuadorian market as a replacement for the Chevrolet D-Max that was produced in the closed GM OBB assembly plant in Quito.

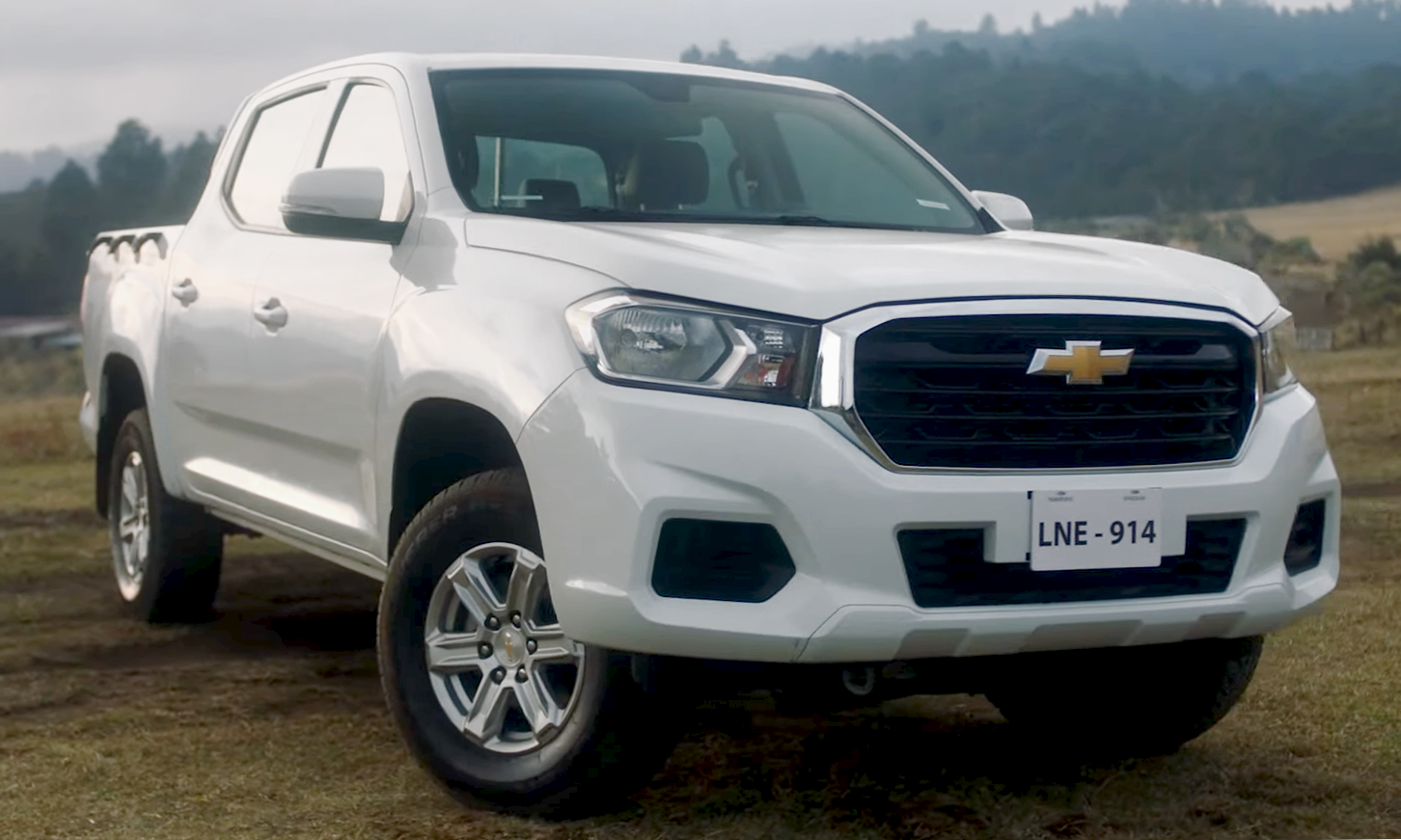
Chevrolet S10 Max Crew Cab (Mexico)

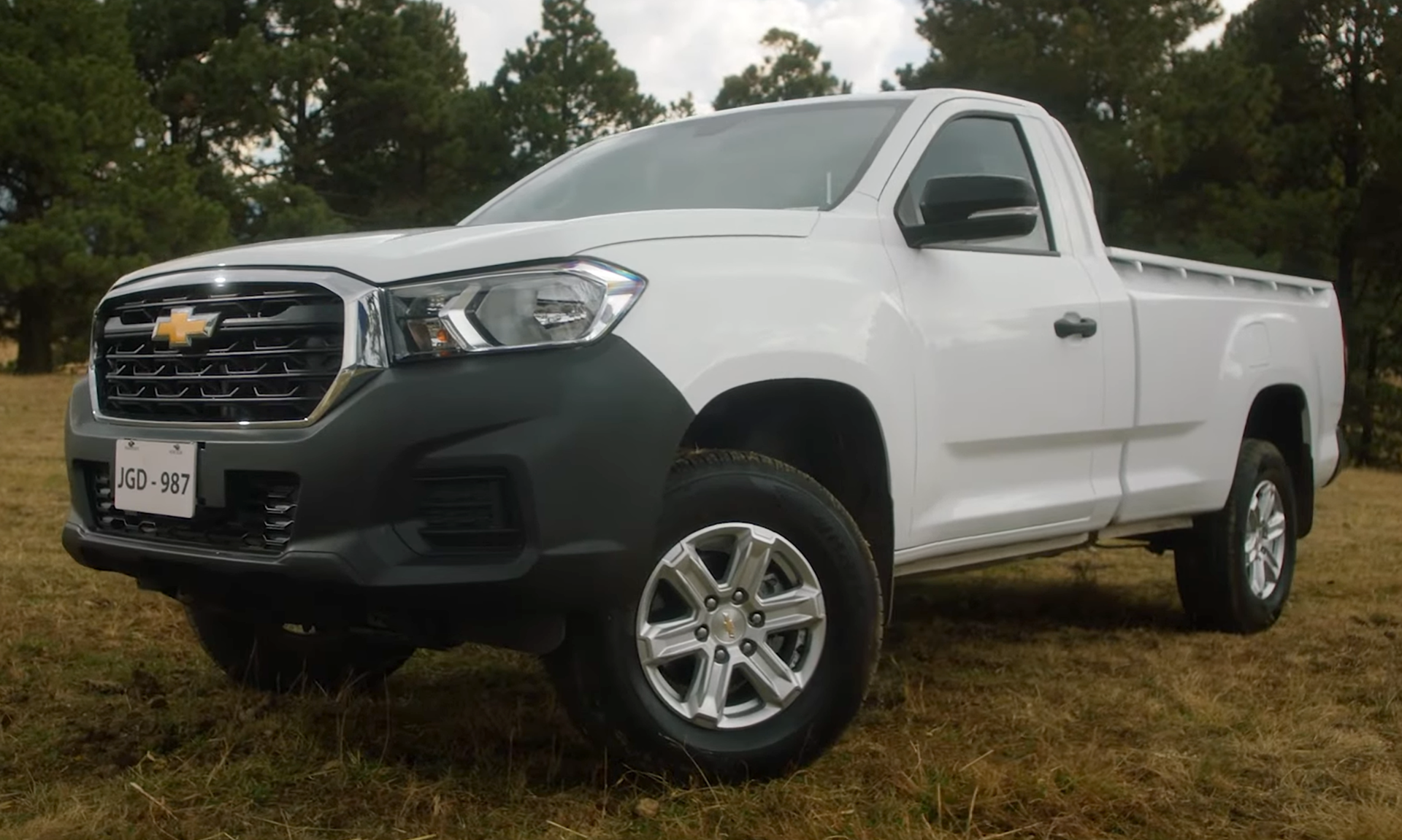
Chevrolet S10 Max Regular Cabin (Mexico)

== Specifications ==
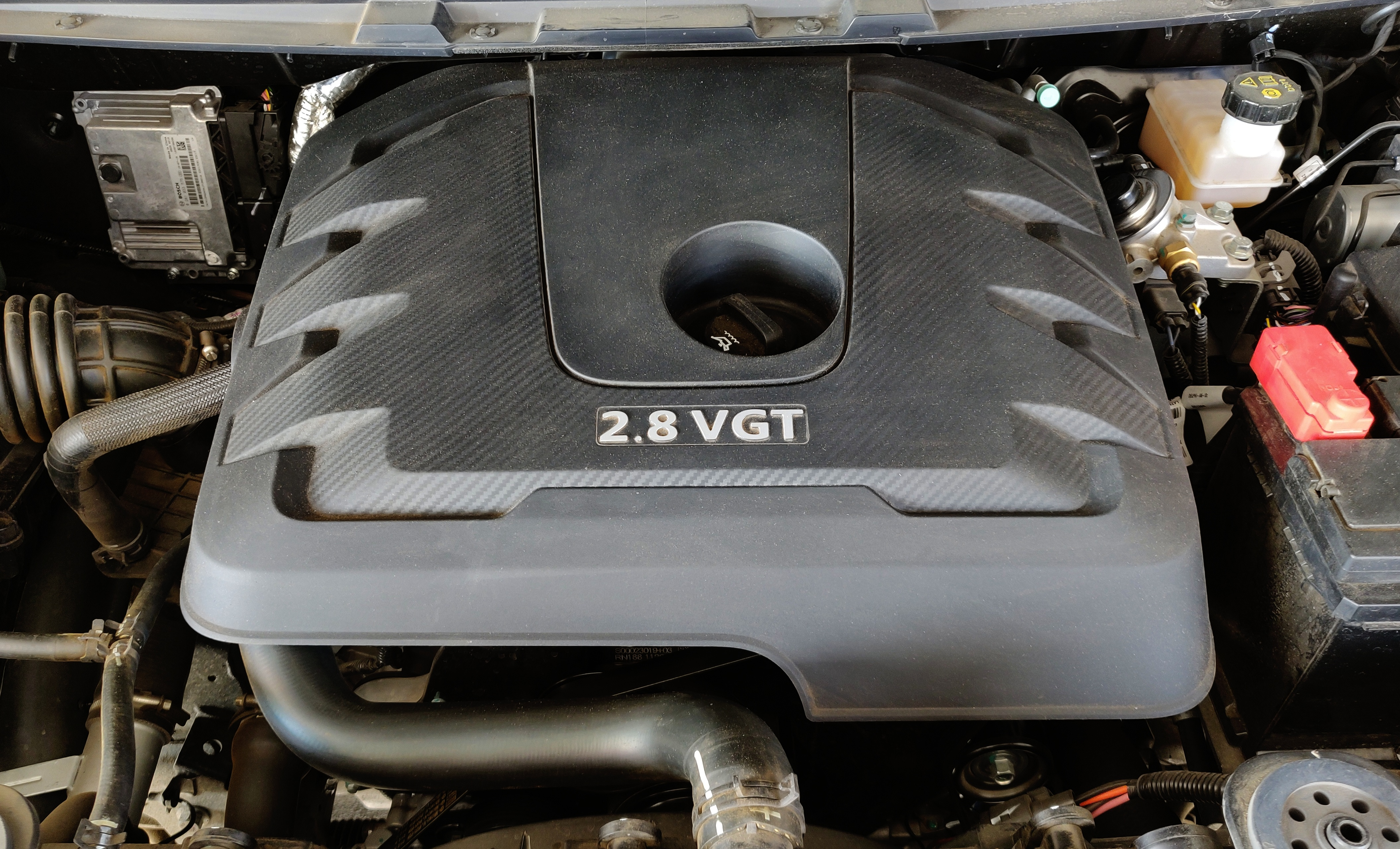
SDEC R-series SC28R 150 Q5 VGT diesel engine from a Maxus T60

The original Maxus T60 is powered by a 2.8 liters R series SC28R engine based on a VM Motori RA 428 engine licence. It is an I4 intercooled, variable-geometry turbocharged diesel engine manufactured by SDEC. In November 2017, two new engine options were added; a 2.0 litre SAIC-GM MGE 20L4E Inline 4 turbocharged engine producing 224 horsepower, with 6 speed manual or 6 speed automatic transmission and an older 2.4 litre Mitsubishi Sirius-family SAIC 4G69S4N Inline 4 naturally aspirated petrol engine, producing 136 horsepower with a 5 speed Aisin manual gearbox.

The T60 is a traditional body-on-frame truck with double wishbone suspension at the front and leaf springs at the rear. The T60 range consists of single cab, extended cab, double cab and extended double cab, combined with either rear-wheel drive or four-wheel-drive, and is powered by turbocharged gasoline or turbocharged direct injection (TDI) diesel engines.

The T60 includes a BorgWarner part-time transfer case, in conjunction with an Eaton automatic differential lock matched with a Shanghai GKN driveshaft. The automatic gearbox is built under licence from Punch Powertrain while the 6-speed manual transmission is built by Hyundai DYMOS (Now Hyundai TRANSYS).

The T60 has a Bosch 9.1 electronic stability control system.

The T60 has an approach angle of 27.2 degrees and a "low speed four-wheel drive" mode, which can amplify the maximum torque to 900 N·m and maximum grade of climb to 54%. The T60 has a maximum wading depth of 800mm.

All versions include three driving modes; Normal, Eco (for increased fuel efficiency), and Power (for increased torque and speed). Luxury versions include a lane departure warning system, 360º surround camera and hill start assist.

The 2.0L Petrol models are equipped with a sunroof.

== Powertrains ==
Engines
Model	Transmission	Configuration	Displacement	Power	Torque	Emission standard	Fuel
SAIC-GM 20L4E TGI	GM 6L50 6-speed manual	I4	1,995 cc (2.0 L)	160 kW (218 PS; 215 bhp) at 5300 rpm	350 N⋅m (258 lb⋅ft) at 2000-4000 rpm	Euro 6	Petrol
SAIC-GM 20L4E TGI	GM 6L50 6-speed manual	I4	1,995 cc (2.0 L)	165 kW (224 PS; 221 bhp) at 5000 rpm	360 N⋅m (266 lb⋅ft) at 2500-3500 rpm	Euro 5	Petrol
SAIC D20 (SDEC SC20M 163 Q6A) single-turbocharger	SAGW SC48M6B 6-speed manual	I4	1,996 cc (2.0 L)	120 kW (163 PS; 161 bhp) at 4000 rpm	375 N⋅m (277 lb⋅ft) at 1500-2400 rpm	Euro 6b	Diesel
Mitsubishi 4G69 S4N	Aisin 5-speed manual	I4	2,378 cc (2.4 L)	100 kW (136 PS; 134 bhp) at 5750 rpm	200 N⋅m (148 lb⋅ft) at 2500-3000 rpm	Euro 5	Petrol
Mitsubishi 4G69 S4N	Aisin 5-speed manual	I4	2,378 cc (2.4 L)	104 kW (141 PS; 139 bhp) at 5750 rpm	200 N⋅m (148 lb⋅ft) at 3500 rpm	Euro 4	Petrol
SDEC SC28R 150 Q5; Variable-geometry turbocharger	Hyundai DYMOS 6-speed manual Punch Powertrain 6-speed automatic	I4	2,776 cc (2.8 L)	110 kW (150 PS; 148 bhp) at 3400 rpm	360 N⋅m (266 lb⋅ft) at 1600–2800 rpm	Euro 5	Diesel
SDEC SC28R 136.2 Q4; Fixed-geometry turbocharger	Hyundai DYMOS 6-speed manual Punch Powertrain 6-speed automatic	I4	2,776 cc (2.8 L)	100 kW (136 PS; 134 bhp) at 3200 rpm	350 N⋅m (258 lb⋅ft) at 1800–2500 rpm	Euro 4	Diesel

== Special models ==
=== Maxus T60 Off-road Edition ===
Introduced at the 2017 Auto Shanghai, the T60 Off-Road Edition (Chinese: T60越野版) is an off-road oriented version of the original 2.8 T60. The T60 Off-Road Edition is first pickup truck in China to comply with the official off-road modification legislation of the Ministry of Industry and Information Technology and legal to drive in China.

This special edition T60 includes off-road equipment such as front and rear metal bumpers, winch, trailer hook, off-road spotlights, engine compartment buckles, new wheels, A/T tires, snorkel and nitrogen shock absorbers.

=== Maxus T60 Cross ===
At the 2018 Chengdu Auto Show, Maxus introduced the T60 Cross as a new off-road oriented version of the T60, with less radical customizations than the 2017 T60 Off-road Edition, initially offering it as an upgrade kit. The T60 Cross includes a large snorkel air intake, new "Tomahawk" wheels, 255/55R19 high performance tires, front guard bars, new integrated roll cage, armored chassis, rear trailer bar and new luggage racks. The T60 Cross is offered both as an upgrade kit for 2.8L T60s and in 12 stock models.

=== Trailrider ===
Special edition for Australia with an updated suspension tuned by Walkinshaw Automotive Group, larger wheels (17-inch 6x130 Maxus "Tomahawk"), 255/55R19 Continental ContiSportContact tires and front guard bars.

The Trailrider 2, launched in May 2020, is powered by the new SAIC-GM SC20M diesel engine found in the new Maxus T70.

=== Pioneer Edition ===
The T60 Pioneer Edition (Chinese: T60先锋版) is a special 2020 edition sold in Mainland China, powered by the new SAIC D20 "Phi" engine.

== Export markets ==
As of 2019, the Maxus T60 is sold in Australia, Bahrain, Bolivia (4G69 S4N engine), Brunei, Chile, Mainland China, Costa Rica (SC28R 136.2 Q4 engine), Dominican Republic, Kuwait, Libya (4G69 S4N engine), Malaysia, Myanmar, New Zealand, Panama (SC28R 136.2 Q4 engine), Peru (2.8L diesel), Philippines (SC28R 136.2 Q4 engine), Saudi Arabia, Tahiti (2.8L diesel), Thailand, the UAE and Venezuela.

Sales are set to start in the United Kingdom in Q4 2019.

=== Australia ===
On 25 September 2017, the T60 was officially launched in Australia as the LDV T60. It became the first Chinese-manufactured utility pickup truck to score 5 stars on the ANCAP rating. It undercuts many other utility trucks in the Australian market.

The Australian delivered models also come with a 5-year, 130,000-kilometre (81,000 mi) warranty including roadside assistance. In March 2022 it was announced an electric model, known as the LDV eT60, would be released in Australia by the end of the year. In November 2022, the LDV eT60 and LDV eDeliver 9 were launched in Australia.

3 trim levels are available in Australia. All of include 2.8L SC28R 150 Q5 VGT (Euro 5) diesel engine, 6 airbags, disc brakes, ABS, EBA, EBD, Hill Descent Control, Traction Control System, hill start assist, TPMS, TCS and VCD.

- Cab Chassis (4WD) manual transmission. (Special order through LDV dealers, not sold on showroom floors)
- PRO (4WD) dual cab, manual & automatic transmission.
- LUXE (4WD) dual cab, manual & automatic transmission.
- Trailrider (4WD) dual cab, manual & automatic transmission. (Special edition limited to 300-500 units per year, not released in 2021 due to supply chain constraints)

=== Chile ===
Chile became the first foreign market to sell the T60. Kaufmann Group subsidiary Andes Motor is the official distributor of the Maxus brand for Chile.

Pre-sales started in July 2017, with the first units being delivered in September 2017 with a 3-year, 100,000-kilometre (62,000 mi) warranty.

In April 2018, Andes Motor reported already having sold more than a thousand units and by the end of the year it became the 10th most-sold pick up truck of 2018, outpacing all Chinese competitors according to the National Automotive Association of Chile.

By 2021, the T60 became the third most sold pickup truck in the country, and by 2022, the second.

==== Available trim levels ====
There are 3 trim levels available in Chile. Models include the 2.8L SC28R 150 Q5 VGT (Euro 5) diesel engine for standard version and the 2.0 SC20M163 (Euro 5) for the "D20" version.

- DX (2WD, 4WD) Single cab, dual cab, manual
- GL (2WD, 4WD) dual cab, manual & automatic (2WD only)
- GLX (4WD) dual cab, automatic

== Safety ==
ANCAP test results* LDV T60 all variants excluding eT60 (2017)
Test	Score
Overall	5 /5 stars
Frontal offset	14.46/16
Side impact	16/16
Pole	2/2
Seat belt reminders	3/3
Whiplash protection	Good
Pedestrian protection	Adequate
Electronic stability control	Standard

== Sales ==
Year	Australia	Chile	Thailand
Year	LDV T60	Maxus T60	MG Extender
2017		641	
2018	3,210	2,334	
2019	3,529	2,775	482
2020	5,581	2,742	5,387
2021	6,705	7,688	5,333
2022		12,026	2,562
2023	9,106	7,280	930
2024	6,330	5,137	1,124
