= Maxus T90 =

Mid-size pickup truck

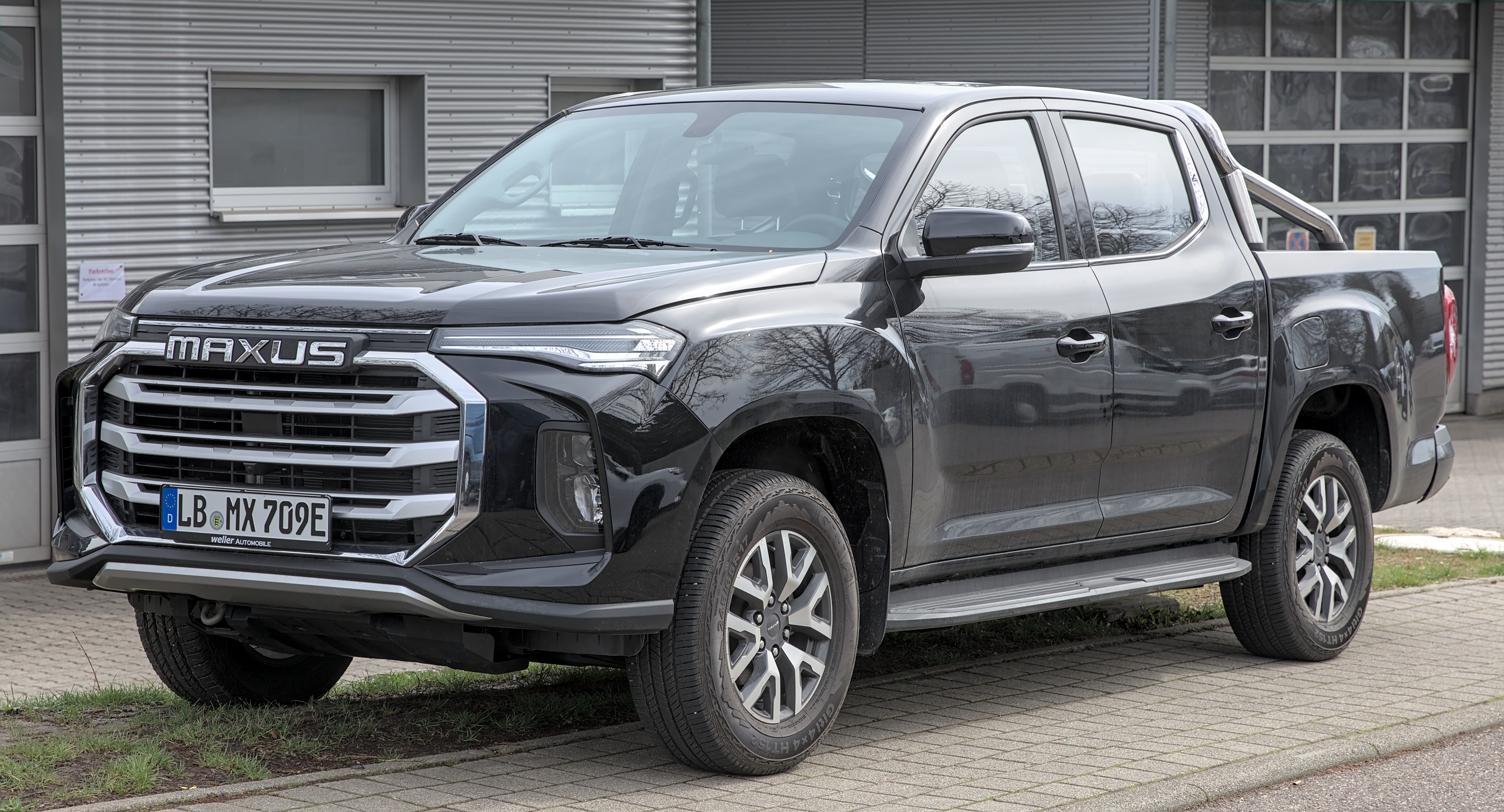

Overview
- Manufacturer: Maxus (SAIC Motor)
- Also called: LDV T60 Bi-turbo (New Zealand); LDV T60 MAX (Australia); Maxus Interstellar H/Bull Demon King (China, 2023–present); Maxus Interstellar EV (China, Electric); Maxus Tornado 90 (Saudi Arabia); MG Extender (facelift; Laos, Thailand and Pakistan)
- Production: 2021–present
- Model years: 2022–present
- Assembly: China: Wuxi, Jiangsu (SAIC Maxus Wuxi Branch); Thailand: Laem Chabang, Chonburi (SAIC-CP)

Body and chassis
- Class: Mid-size pickup truck
- Body style: 4-door pickup truck
- Layout: Front engine, rear-wheel drive / four-wheel drive
- Platform: Maxus T platform (SK8C)

Powertrain
- Engine: 2.0 L SAIC D20 biturbo I4 (diesel); 2.0 L 20A4E turbocharged I4 (petrol); 130 kW (174 hp; 177 PS) EV Electric
- Electric motor: Permanent magnet synchronous (EV)
- Transmission: 6-speed SAGW SC48M6B manual 6-speed GM 6L50 automatic 8-speed ZF 8HP50 automatic 1-speed direct-drive (EV)
- Battery: 88.55 kWh (EV)
- Range: 321 km (199 mi) (EV)

Dimensions
- Wheelbase: 3,155 mm (124.2 in) (Short wheelbase); 3,470 mm (136.6 in) (Long wheelbase)
- Length: 5,365 mm (211.2 in) (Short wheelbase); 5,680 mm (223.6 in) (Long wheelbase)
- Width: 1,900 mm (74.8 in)
- Height: 1,845 mm (72.6 in)
- Curb weight: 2,300 kg (5,071 lb)

Chronology
- Predecessor: Maxus T70
- Successor: Maxus Terron 9

The Maxus T90 is a mid-size pickup truck produced by SAIC Maxus. The T90 is the flagship Maxus pickup truck, sitting above the more affordable Maxus T60 and Maxus T70 series.

== Overview ==
In November 2021, the Maxus T90 Bull Demon King pickup truck was unveiled as the production version of the July 2020 concept Chengdu Auto Show.

== Specifications ==
The cabin of the Maxus T90 has a 10.25-inch digital dash cluster and a 12-inch central display which are both slightly turned to face the driver, resulting in an asymmetrical instrumental panel design. The Maxus T90 sold in China is equipped with the Zebra Zhixing system, which is equipped with remote control, voice recognition, car navigation, Bluetooth key, online clips, online music, group travel, video projection and smart home control.

== Powertrain ==
There are two ICE powertrains available; one petrol and one diesel. The 2.0 litre π bi-turbo diesel produces 160 kW (215 hp; 218 PS) of power and 500 N⋅m (369 lb⋅ft; 51 kg⋅m) of torque. There is also a SAIC 20A4E turbo petrol that produces 184 kW (247 hp; 250 PS) of power and 410 N⋅m (302 lb⋅ft; 42 kg⋅m) of torque. The engines are mated to 6-speed manual, 6-speed automatic and 8-speed ZF automatic transmissions. Upper trim models support 12 driving modes. The driver can switch between 2H, 4H, AUTO and 4L driving modes with Eco, Power, and Normal driving modes through a simple button control. Four-wheel-drive is available as an optional feature,

An electric version with a 177 PS (175 hp; 130 kW) electric motor and 535 kilometres (332 mi) of NEDC range is also offered.

Engines
Model	Transmission	Engine	Displacement	Power	Torque	Emission standard	Fuel
SAIC D20	6-speed manual (SC48M6B) & automatic (6L50); 8-speed ZF 8HP50 automatic	I4	1,996 cc (2.0 L)	120 kW (163 PS; 161 hp) at 4000 rpm	400 N⋅m (295 lb⋅ft; 41 kg⋅m) at 1500-2400 rpm	Euro 5 & 6b	Diesel
SAIC "π" bi-turbo	6-speed manual (SC48M6B) & automatic (6L50); 8-speed ZF 8HP50 automatic	I4	1,995 cc (2.0 L)	160 kW (218 PS; 215 hp) at 4000 rpm	500 N⋅m (369 lb⋅ft; 51 kg⋅m) at 1500-2400 rpm	Euro 5 & 6b	Diesel
130KW EV	-	-	-	130 kW (177 PS; 174 hp)	310 N⋅m (229 lb⋅ft)	-	Electric

== Markets ==
=== Australia ===
The diesel powered T90 launched in Australia and New Zealand as the LDV T60 Max in November of 2021 for the 2022 model year. In November 2022, the electric Maxus T90 (LDV eT60) and LDV eDeliver 9 were launched in Australia.

The diesel was initially offered in either Pro ($35,779 with three pedals, or $37,884 in auto form for private buyers, drive-away) or Luxe ($40,516 with a manual transmission or $42,621 with an auto) specification. The Luxe was later replaced by the Plus specification, with different styling to the Luxe and Pro.

The eT60 is offered only in one specification. Pricing is steep, at $92,990 before on-road costs.

The petrol never made its way to either nation, all prices are in AUD.

== Gallery ==
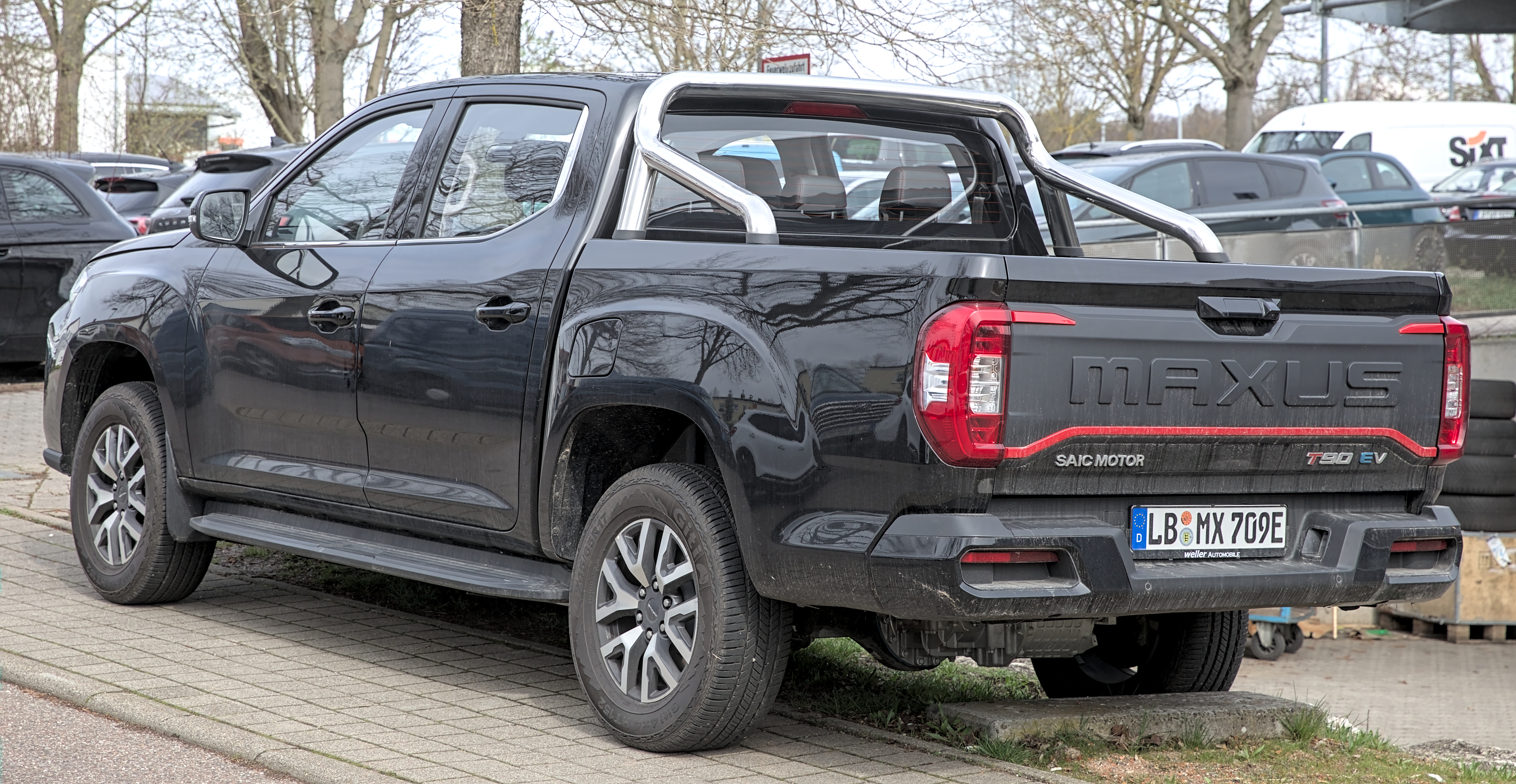
Rear view

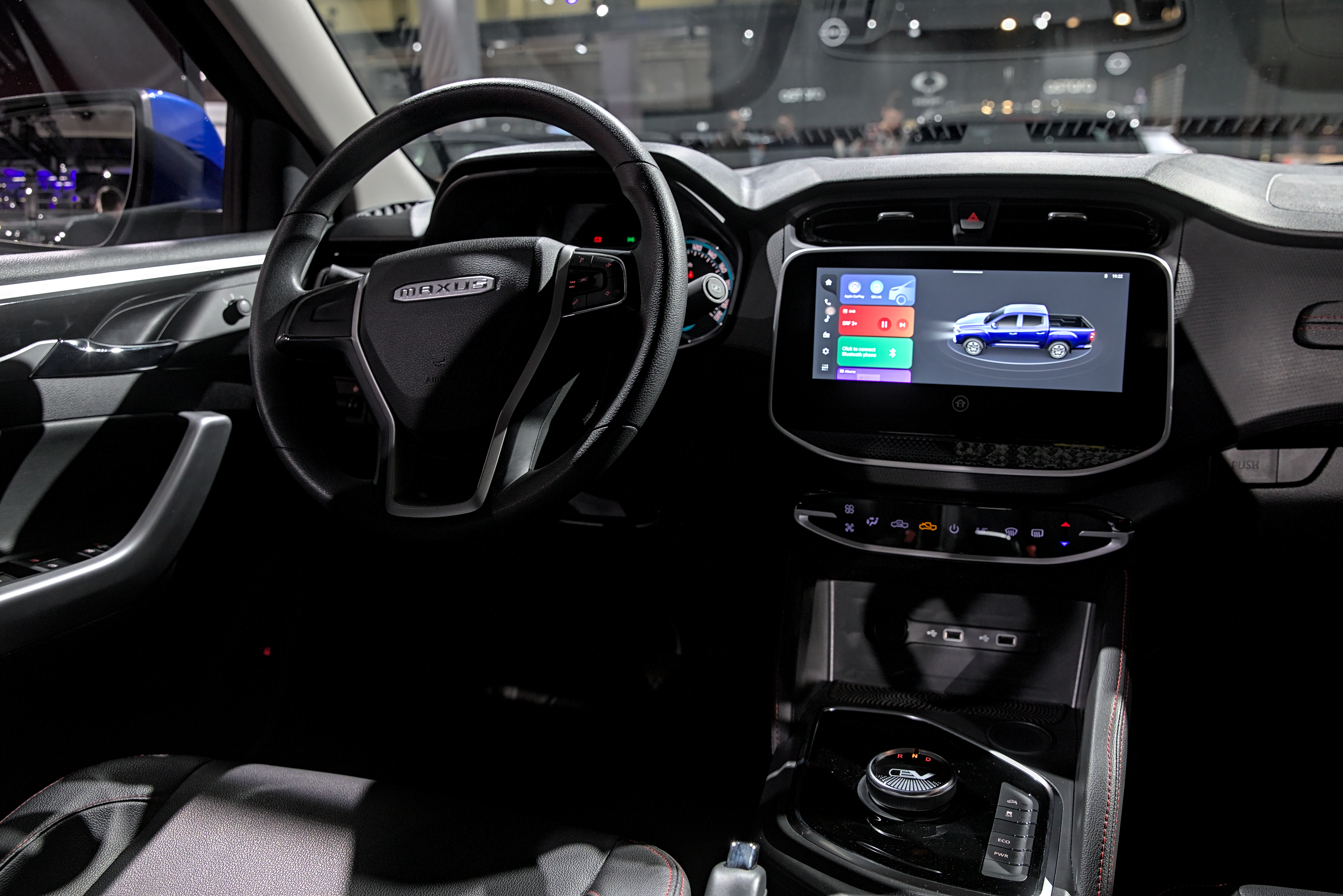
Interior

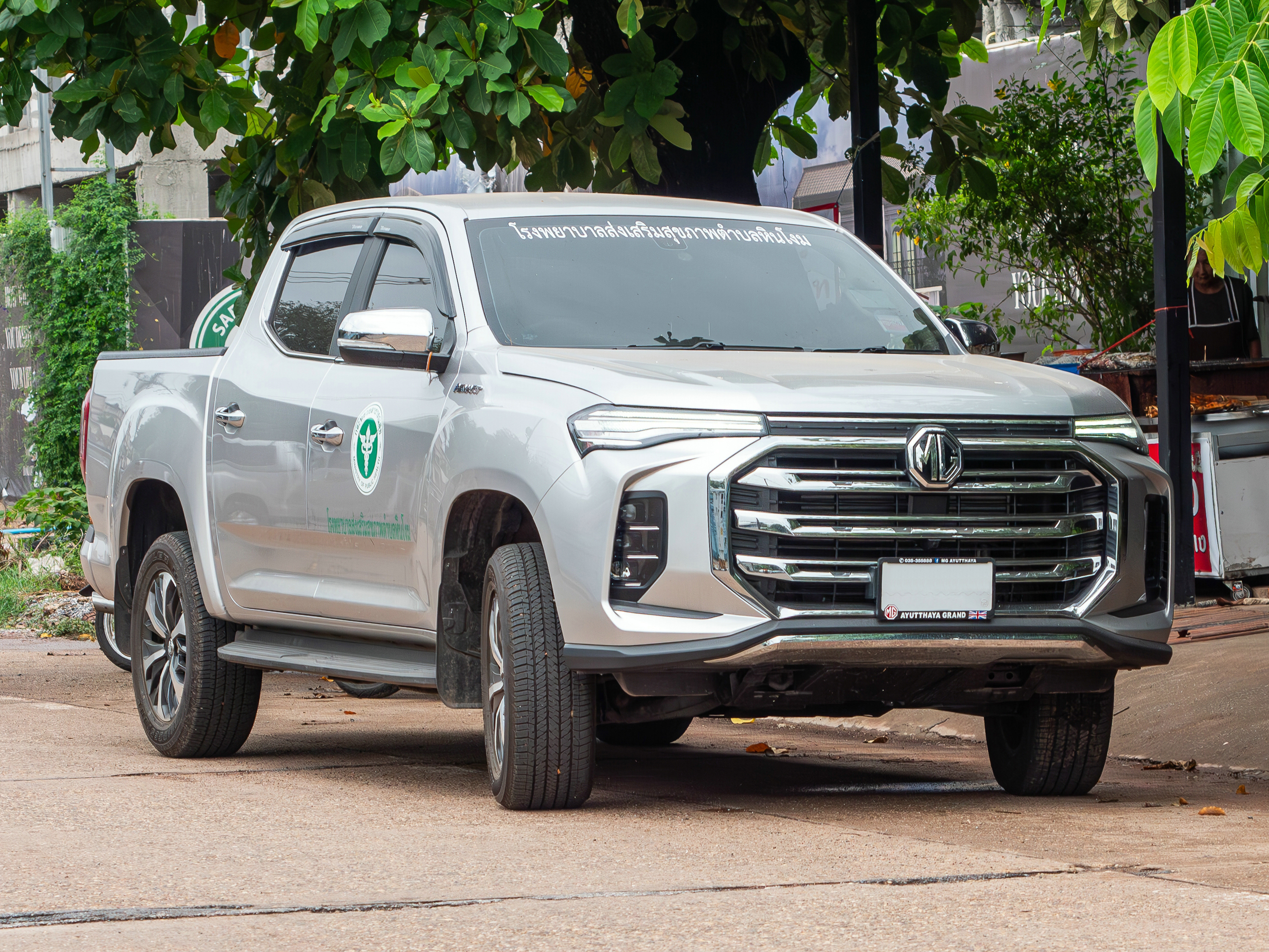
MG Extender (facelift)
