= SAIC Hongyan =

Chinese truck manufacturing company

SAIC Hongyan Automotive Co., Ltd.
- Trade name: Hongyan
- Formerly: Chongqing Hongyan Motor Co., Ltd.; SAIC Iveco Hongyan Commercial Vehicle Co., Ltd.
- Company type: Subsidiary
- Industry: Automotive
- Predecessor: Sichuan Automotive Manufacturing Plant
- Founded: January 2003; 23 years ago
- Headquarters: Chongqing, China
- Area served: Worldwide
- Key people: Lou Jianping (General manager)
- Products: Trucks
- Production output: ▲55,697 (2018)
- Number of employees: 5,000
- Parent: Shanghai New Power Automotive Technology

Chinese name
- Simplified Chinese: 上汽红岩汽车有限公司
- Traditional Chinese: 上汽紅岩汽車有限公司
Transcriptions
Standard Mandarin
- Hanyu Pinyin: Shàngqì Hóngyán Qìchē Yǒuxiàn Gōngsī

Hongyan
- Simplified Chinese: 红岩
- Traditional Chinese: 紅岩
- Literal meaning: Red rock
Transcriptions
Standard Mandarin
- Hanyu Pinyin: Hóngyán
- Wade–Giles: Hung^{2}-yen^{2}
- IPA: [xʊ̌ŋjɛ̌n]
other Mandarin
- Sichuanese Pinyin: Hong^{2}-ngai^{2}
Wu
- Romanization: Ghon^{平}yie^{平}
Yue: Cantonese
- Yale Romanization: Hùhngngàahm
- Jyutping: hung4 ngaam4
- IPA: [hʊŋ˩ŋam˩]
- Website: www.hongyantruck.com/en/

SAIC Hongyan Automotive Co., Ltd. is a Chinese truck manufacturing company headquartered in Chongqing, China and owned by Shanghai New Power Automotive Technology, a subsidiary of SAIC. The company was established in January 2003 as a joint venture co-owned by the Chongqing municipality with the name Chongqing Hongyan and traces its origins back to a Chinese manufacturer established in 1965. In 2007, it was renamed SAIC Iveco Hongyan Commercial Vehicle after SAIC and Iveco bought shares in the venture. In September 2021, it adopted its present name after becoming a wholly owned subsidiary of Shanghai New Power Automotive Technology. The company is focused on producing Iveco-based heavy trucks which are mostly marketed under the Hongyan marque.

== History ==
=== Sichuan Automotive an CNHTC era (1965–2001) ===
On 1 October 1965, the Chinese government started building an assembly plant for military vehicles in Chongqing, the Sichuan Automotive Manufacturing Plant. The plant began production in 1966, initially assembling Hongyan-badged military vehicles based on Berliet technology. In the 1980s, the plant used Steyr technology for heavy-duty trucks and entered into the civilian market. The plant launched new products and diversified its heavy truck offer during the 1990s, increasing exports to foreign markets.

=== Chongqin Hongyan era (2003–2005) ===
The Sichuan plant was part of CNHTC until 2001, when financial difficulties forced CNHTC to divest it. In December 2002, Xiang Torch, a publicly traded company involved in the automotive industry, and state-owned Chongqing Heavy Vehicle Group formed the Chongqing Hongyan company as a joint venture based on the Chongqing plant. The official establishment was in January 2003. Xiang Torch owned 51%, its parent Delong 4% and the rest was owned by Chongqing Heavy Vehicle Group. Following Delong's stock collapse, Xiang Torch purchased its parent's stake. In December 2003, Xiang Torch signed a cooperation agreement with the Italian company Iveco, and Iveco and Chongqing Hongyan jointly developed and produced high-end heavy-duty vehicles. In 2005, Delong, the major shareholder of Xiang Torch, was broken. At this point, the Chongqing Municipal State-owned Assets Supervision and Administration Commission (ultimate owner of Chongqing Heavy Vehicle Group) forced out Xiang Torch and started the restructuring of Chongqing Hongyan.

=== SAIC Iveco Hongyan era (2005–2021) ===
In December 2005, SAIC, Iveco and Chongqing Hongyan signed the "Joint Venture Cooperation Framework Agreement" in Chongqing, officially kicking off the joint venture cooperation. Iveco ended another Chinese joint venture, Changzhou Iveco, to avoid Chinese restrictions over more than two joint ventures producing the same type of vehicle, as it was already operating a joint venture with Nanjing Auto. In June 2006, the three parties signed a memorandum of understanding on the joint venture. In July 2006, Iveco announced that it had reached a joint venture agreement with SAIC to establish the equally owned SAIC Iveco Commercial Vehicle Investment Co., Ltd. (SAIC Iveco). In August 2006, SAIC Iveco was officially approved by the Ministry of Commerce. On 18 September 2006, SAIC, Chongqing Heavy Vehicle Group and Iveco Commercial Vehicle Investment signed a strategic cooperation agreement at the Great Hall of the People in Beijing. In mid-October, the SAIC Iveco Hongyan company was finally operational and got the final government approvals in May 2007. The official establishment date for the joint venture was on 5 June 2007. SAIC Iveco held a 67% stake and Chongqing Heavy Vehicle Group a 33% stake. SAIC Iveco Hongyan began the construction of a new plant and its first product, the Genlyon heavy truck, was launched in 2009. A second truck, the Kingkan, was launched in 2011 and a third, the Gentruck, in 2015. A medium-duty truck, the Genpaw, was introduced in 2018.

In December 2016, it was announced that SAIC Iveco would reduce its stake in the venture to 12.08% while SAIC would hold a direct 53.92% stake and Chongqing Heavy Vehicle Group's parent a 34%. In 2018, SAIC acquired a further 3.04% from SAIC Iveco.

=== SAIC Hongyan era (2021–present） ===
In September 2021, the company was renamed as SAIC Hongyan Automotive Co., Ltd. after Shanghai New Power Automotive Technology, a SAIC affiliate, took full control of the company's shares and made it a wholly owned subsidiary.

== Operations and products ==
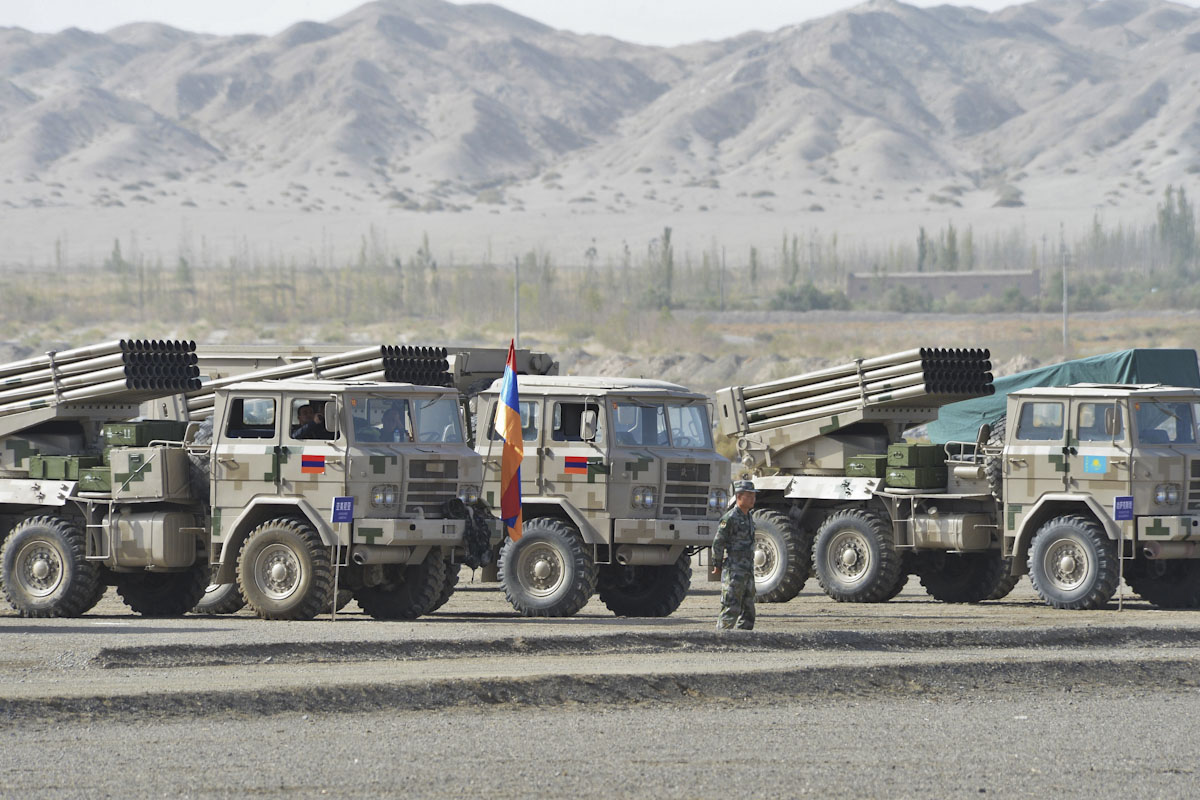
Hongyan OQ261

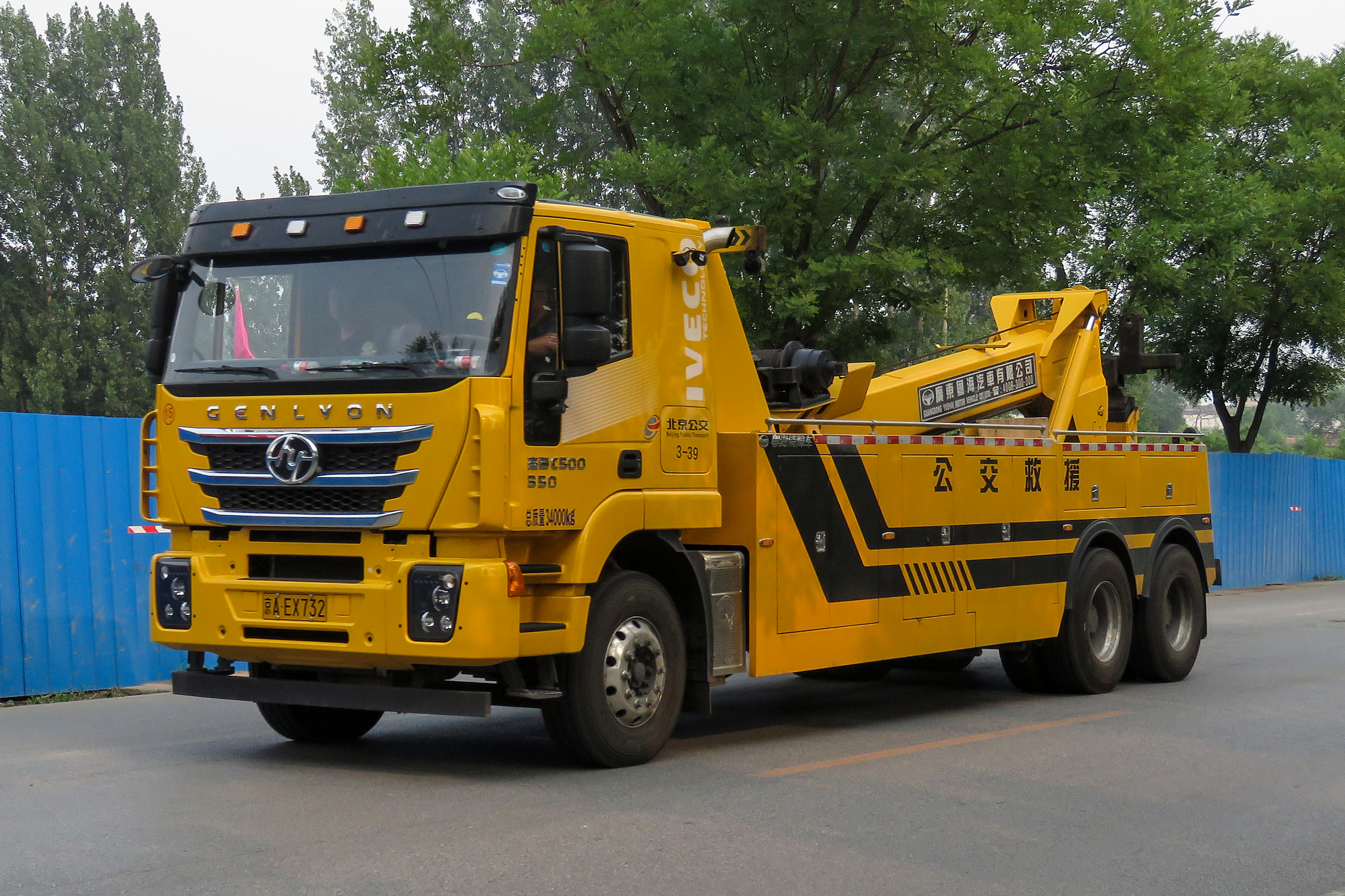
A Hongyan Genlyon truck, pictured in 2018

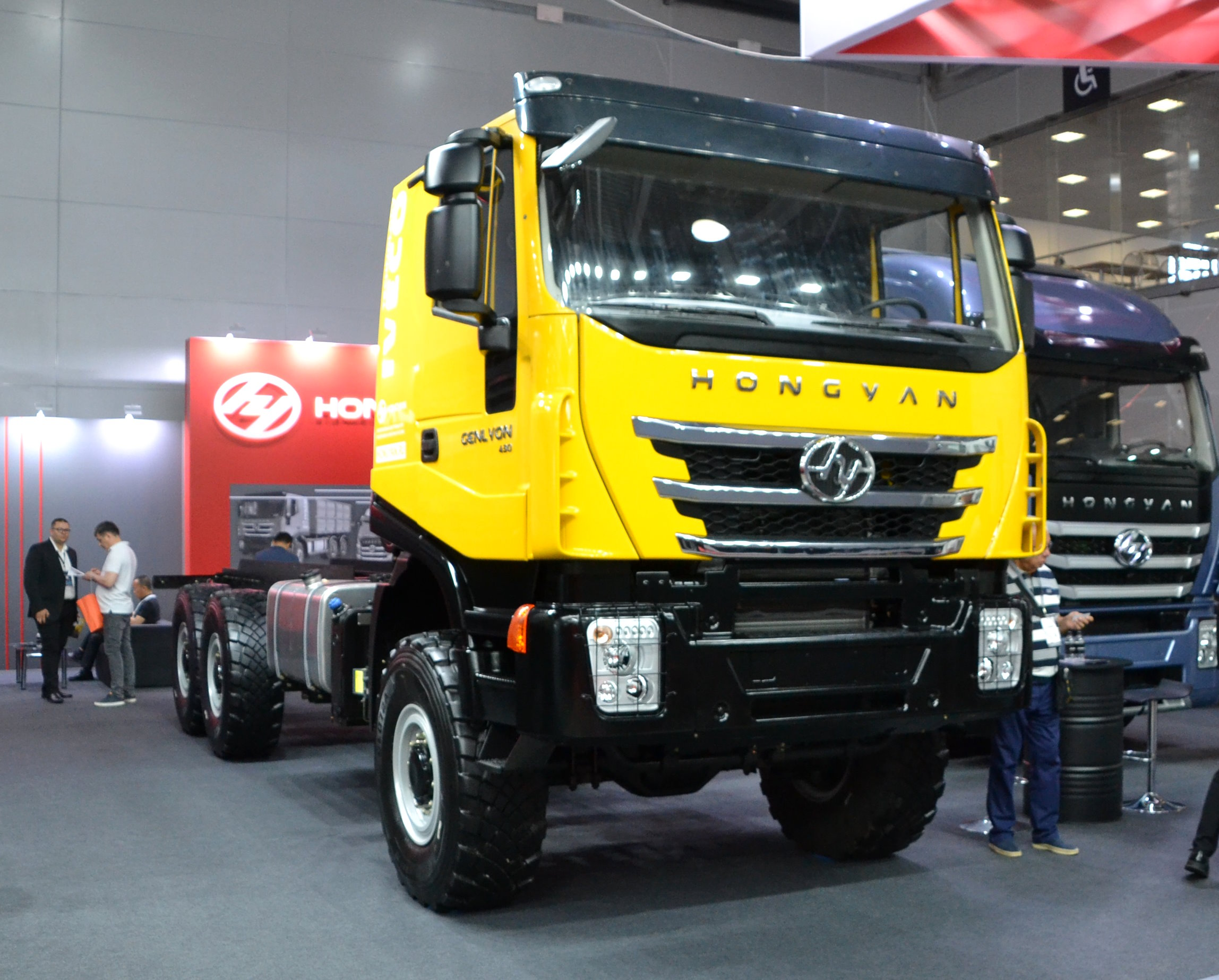
Hongyan Genlyon heavy duty truck, pictured at Moscow in 2024

SAIC Hongyan facilities are in the Liangjiang New District of Chongqing. The manufacturing plant, which has the capacity to assemble up to 80,000 vehicles per year, is modeled after Iveco's Madrid plant. SAIC Hongyan Axle Co., Ltd. is a wholly owned subsidiary able to produce up to 300,000 axles per year. SAIC Hongyan produces medium-heavy trucks ranging between 160 and 560 metric horsepower for highway logistics and engineering, construction and special-purpose heavy vehicles. In China, the company markets its products under the Hongyan marque while that for export markets it uses both the Hongyan and Iveco marques. As of 2019, trucks produced by SAIC Hongyan include the Genlyon (based on the Iveco Stralis AS), the Kingkan, the Genpaw and the Gentruck.
