= SDEC R engine =

SDEC R Series
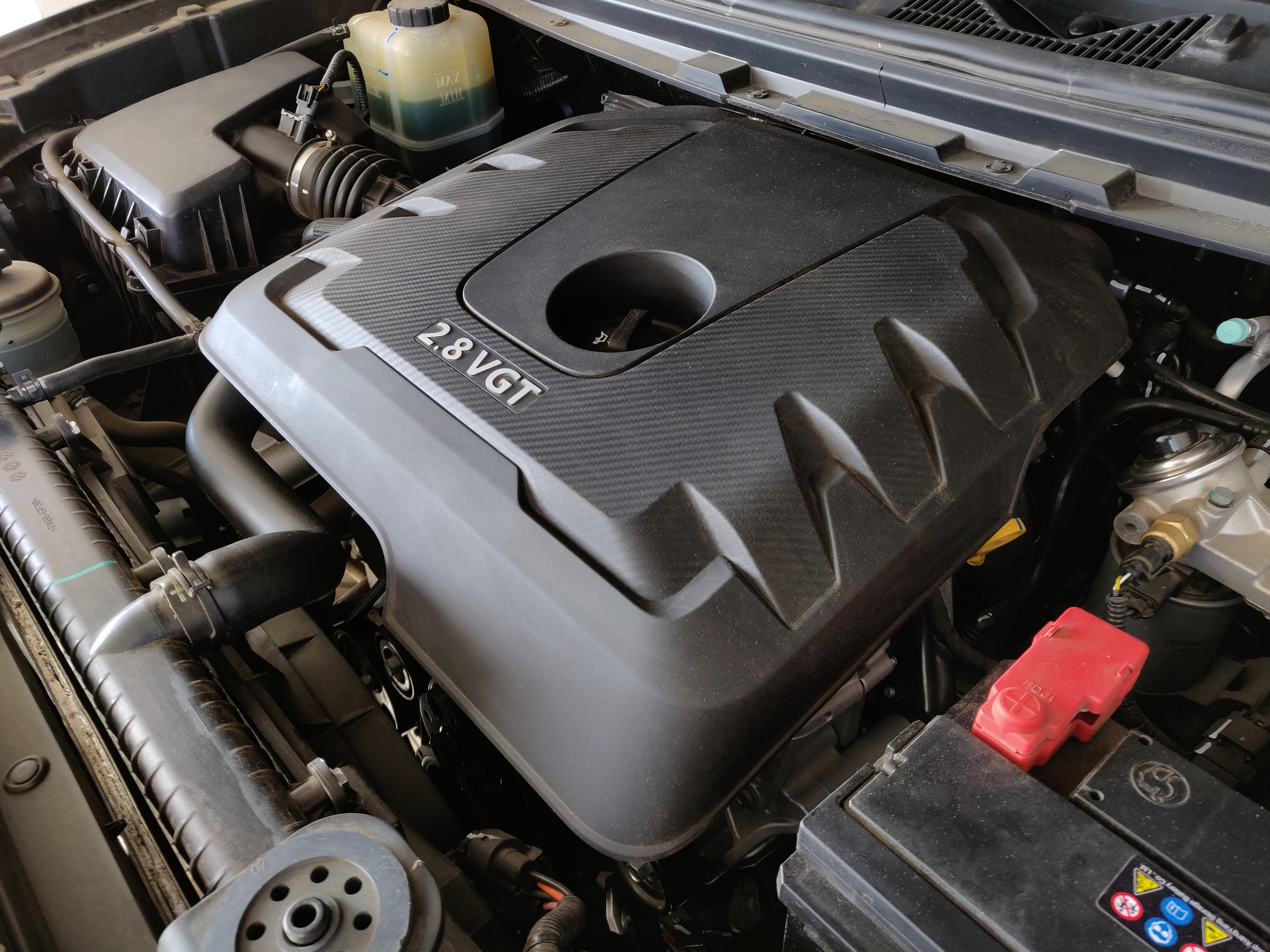
- SDEC SC28R 150 Q5

Overview
- Manufacturer: SDEC

Layout
- Configuration: Inline-4
- Displacement: 2.5–2.8 L (2,499–2,776 cc)
- Valvetrain: DOHC

Combustion
- Turbocharger: variable-geometry turbocharger or fixed geometry turbocharger with intercooler
- Fuel system: Common rail direct injection
- Fuel type: Diesel
- Cooling system: Water-cooled

Output
- Power output: 74–156 PS (54–115 kW; 73–154 hp)
- Torque output: 252–400 N⋅m (186–295 lb⋅ft)

Emissions
- Emissions target standard: Up to Euro 6

The SDEC R Series engines are 2.5–2.8 L (2,499–2,776 cc) Inline-4 diesel engines from SDEC. They are light-duty truck engines based on licensed VM Motori designs.

== Nomenclature ==
SDEC R Series engines use a non-fixed naming convention:

- The first two characters "SC" signifies SDEC-Shangai Diesel Engine Co.
- The next two characters refer to the displacement of the engine; "25" = 2.5L, "28" = 2.8L.
- The next characters indicate peak metric horsepower produced.
- The Q letter indicates the emission standard. "Q4" = Euro/China 4, "Q5A" = Euro 5a, "Q6" = Euro 6.

== SC25R ==
2.5L light-duty truck engine based on VM Motori RA 425 DOHC.

SC25R Engines
Model	Configuration	Displacement	Power	Torque
SC25R101	I4	2,499 cc (2.5 L)	74 kW (101 PS; 99 bhp) at 3200 rpm	252 N⋅m (186 lb⋅ft) at 1800–2800 rpm
SC25R120	I4	2,499 cc (2.5 L)	88 kW (120 PS; 118 bhp) at 3800 rpm	320 N⋅m (236 lb⋅ft) at 1800–2500 rpm
SC25R136	I4	2,499 cc (2.5 L)	100 kW (136 PS; 134 bhp) at 3800 rpm	330 N⋅m (243 lb⋅ft) at 1800–2500 rpm
SC25R150	I4	2,499 cc (2.5 L)	110 kW (150 PS; 148 bhp) at 3600 rpm	360 N⋅m (266 lb⋅ft) at 1800–2500 rpm

=== Applications ===
- Joylong A4
- LDV Maxus/Maxus V80 (2011-present)

== SC28R ==
SC28R Diesel engine

Overview
- Manufacturer: SDEC
- Designer: VM Motori, SDEC
- Also called: RA 428
- Production: 2011 – present;

Layout
- Configuration: Inline 4
- Displacement: 2.8 L; 169.4 cu in (2,776 cc)
- Cylinder bore: 94 mm (3.7 in)
- Piston stroke: 100 mm (3.9 in)
- Cylinder block material: Cast iron
- Cylinder head material: Aluminum
- Valvetrain: DOHC 4 valves x cyl.
- Compression ratio: 17:1

RPM range
- Max. engine speed: 3750

Combustion
- Turbocharger: Honeywell variable-geometry turbocharger or fixed geometry turbocharger with intercooler
- Fuel system: Bosch 1600 bar High-pressure common-rail direct injection
- Management: Bosch EDC17C ECU
- Fuel type: Diesel
- Cooling system: Water-cooled

Output
- Power output: 156 PS (115 kW; 154 hp)
- Torque output: 400 N⋅m (295 lb⋅ft)

Emissions
- Emissions target standard: Euro 6
- Emissions control systems: Oxidizing catalyst, DPF, EGR

Chronology
- Predecessor: R 428

Light-duty truck engines based on VM Motori RA 428 DOHC. Based on a tunnel closed cylinder block design, 4-valves per cylinder, high pressure 1600bar BOSCH common rail system, aluminum alloy cylinder head, double overhead cam system and volute casing fixed geometry turbocharger or electronically controlled variable geometry turbocharger, complying with China/Euro 4, 5A and 6 emission standards.

SC28R Engines
Model	Revision	Emission standard	Configuration	Displacement	Power	Torque
SC28R110	0	Q4	I4	2,776 cc (2.8 L)	82 kW (111 PS; 110 bhp) at 3000 rpm	285 N⋅m (210 lb⋅ft) at 1800–2800 rpm
SC28R110	0	Q5	I4	2,776 cc (2.8 L)	82 kW (111 PS; 110 bhp) at 3000 rpm	285 N⋅m (210 lb⋅ft) at 1800–2800 rpm
SC28R125	0	Q4	I4	2,776 cc (2.8 L)	92 kW (125 PS; 123 bhp) at 3000 rpm	340 N⋅m (251 lb⋅ft) at 1800–2500 rpm
SC28R125	0	Q5A	I4	2,776 cc (2.8 L)	92 kW (125 PS; 123 bhp) at 3000 rpm	340 N⋅m (251 lb⋅ft) at 1800–2500 rpm
SC28R136	0	Q4	I4	2,776 cc (2.8 L)	100 kW (136 PS; 134 bhp) at 3200 rpm	350 N⋅m (258 lb⋅ft) at 1800–2500 rpm
SC28R136	0	Q5A	I4	2,776 cc (2.8 L)	100 kW (136 PS; 134 bhp) at 3200 rpm	350 N⋅m (258 lb⋅ft) at 1800–2500 rpm
SC28R143	0	Q4	I4	2,776 cc (2.8 L)	105 kW (143 PS; 141 bhp) at 3600 rpm	330 N⋅m (243 lb⋅ft) at 1800–2500 rpm
SC28R143	0	Q5	I4	2,776 cc (2.8 L)	105 kW (143 PS; 141 bhp) at 3600 rpm	340 N⋅m (251 lb⋅ft) at 1800–2500 rpm
SC28R143	1	Q5A	I4	2,776 cc (2.8 L)	105 kW (143 PS; 141 bhp) at 3600 rpm	350 N⋅m (258 lb⋅ft) at 1800–2500 rpm
SC28R143	2	Q5A	I4	2,776 cc (2.8 L)	105 kW (143 PS; 141 bhp) at 3600 rpm	380 N⋅m (280 lb⋅ft) at 1800–2500 rpm
SC28R150	0	Q5A	I4	2,776 cc (2.8 L)	110 kW (150 PS; 148 bhp) at 3400 rpm	360 N⋅m (266 lb⋅ft) at 1600–2800 rpm
SC28R150	1	Q5A	I4	2,776 cc (2.8 L)	110 kW (150 PS; 148 bhp) at 3400 rpm	380 N⋅m (280 lb⋅ft) at 1600–2800 rpm
SC28R150	0	Q6	I4	2,776 cc (2.8 L)	110 kW (150 PS; 148 bhp) at 3000 rpm	400 N⋅m (295 lb⋅ft) at 1500–2400 rpm
SC28R156	0	Q5A	I4	2,776 cc (2.8 L)	115 kW (156 PS; 154 bhp) at 3000 rpm	400 N⋅m (295 lb⋅ft) at 1800–2400 rpm

=== Applications ===
- Golden Dragon XML6700J15
- King Long Kaige/Kingo
- Joylong A-series
- Maxus T60 (2016-Present)
- Yuejin SH108 type 2

== See also ==
- SDEC Engines
