= Maxus V90 =

Light commercial van

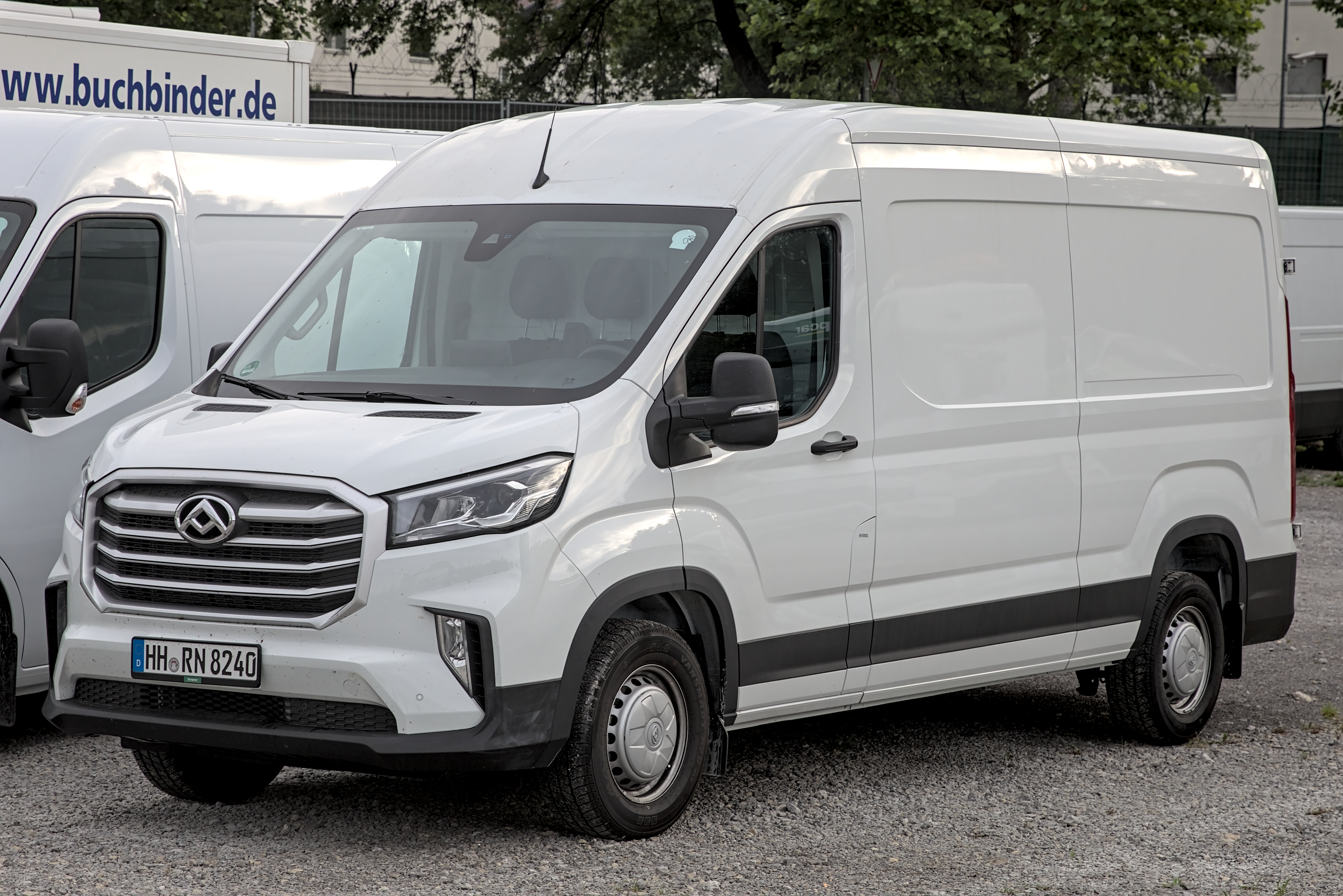

Overview
- Manufacturer: Maxus (SAIC Motor)
- Also called: Maxus Deliver 9 (European markets); Maxus eDeliver 9 (electric version); LDV Deliver 9 (Australia & New Zealand); LDV eDeliver 9 (electric version in New Zealand); LDV e-Deliver 9 (electric version in Australia); Avior V90 (Belarus and Russia); Volkswagen Tempest (Brazil)
- Production: 2019–present
- Assembly: China: Wuxi, Jiangsu

Body and chassis
- Class: Light commercial vehicle (M)
- Body style: Van; Minibus; Chassis cab
- Layout: Longitudinal Front-engine, Front wheel drive (SWB/MWB/LWB); Longitudinal Front-engine, Rear wheel drive (MWB/LWB); Front-motor, front-wheel-drive (EV <3.5 Ton); Rear-motor, rear-wheel-drive (EV 4.5 Ton)

Powertrain
- Engine: 2.0 L SC20M turbo I4 (diesel)
- Electric motor: permanent magnet synchronous electric motor: 150 kW (204 PS; 201 bhp) (FWD); 170 kW (231 PS; 228 bhp) (RWD)
- Transmission: 6-speed manual 6-speed semi-automatic 6-speed automatic
- Battery: 51.5 / 72 / 77 / 88.5 / 100 kWh LFP
- Plug-in charging: 11 kW AC, 80 kW DC

Dimensions
- Wheelbase: 3,366 mm (132.5 in) (standard); 3,760 mm (148.0 in) (LWB)
- Length: 5,546 mm (218.3 in) (standard); 5,940 mm (233.9 in) (LWB)
- Width: 2,062 mm (81.2 in) (standard); 2,110 mm (83.1 in) (LWB)
- Height: 2,555 mm (100.6 in) (standard); 2,525 mm (99.4 in) (LWB); 2,740 mm (107.9 in) (high roof)

Chronology
- Predecessor: Maxus V80

The Maxus V90 is a 2 to 18-seater light commercial van produced by Maxus. It was launched during the Shanghai Auto Show of 2019. The model was aimed to replace the Maxus V80. The vehicle is sold in multiple European markets as the Maxus Deliver 9, including an all-electric version known as the eDeliver 9.

== Overview ==
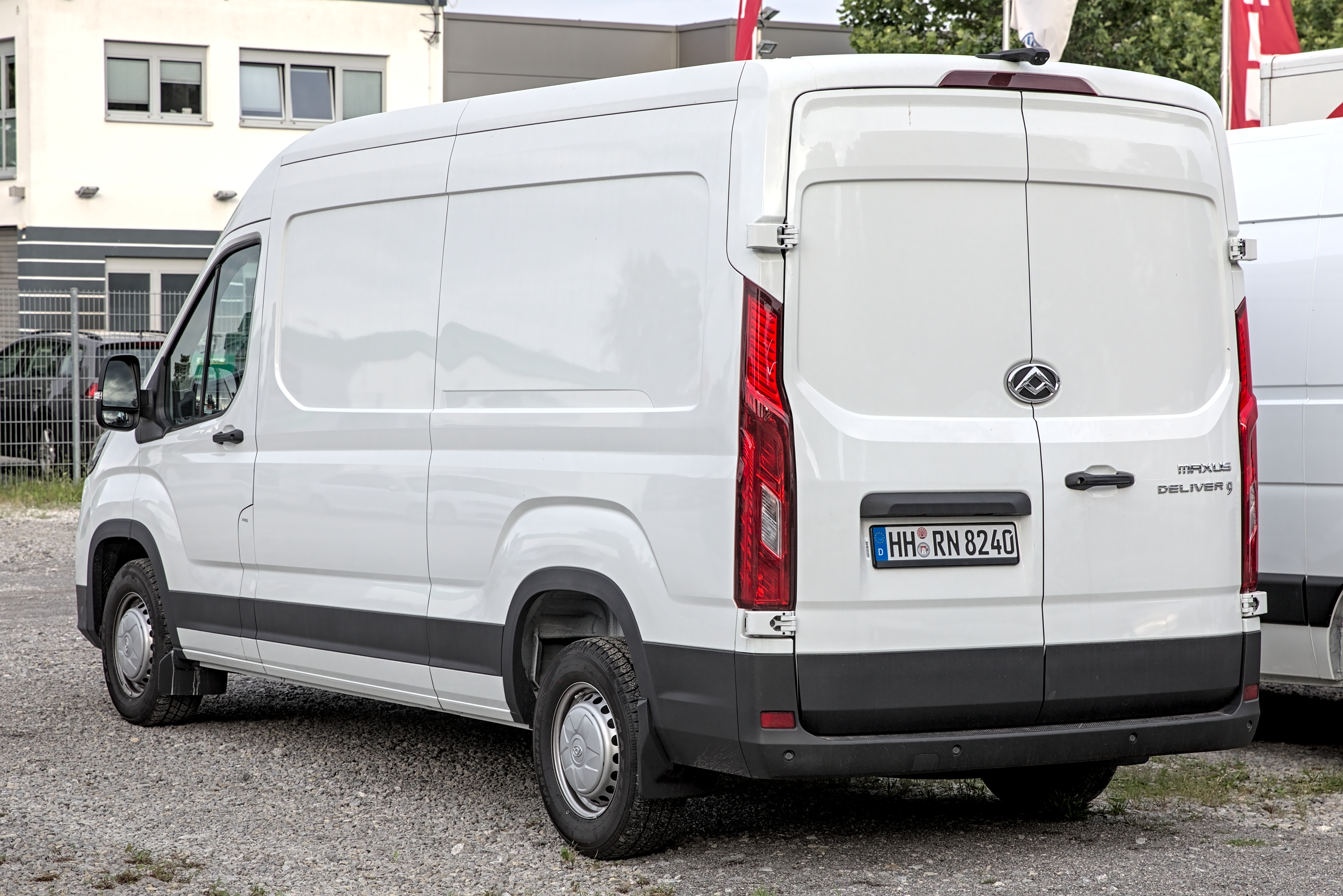
Deliver 9, rear

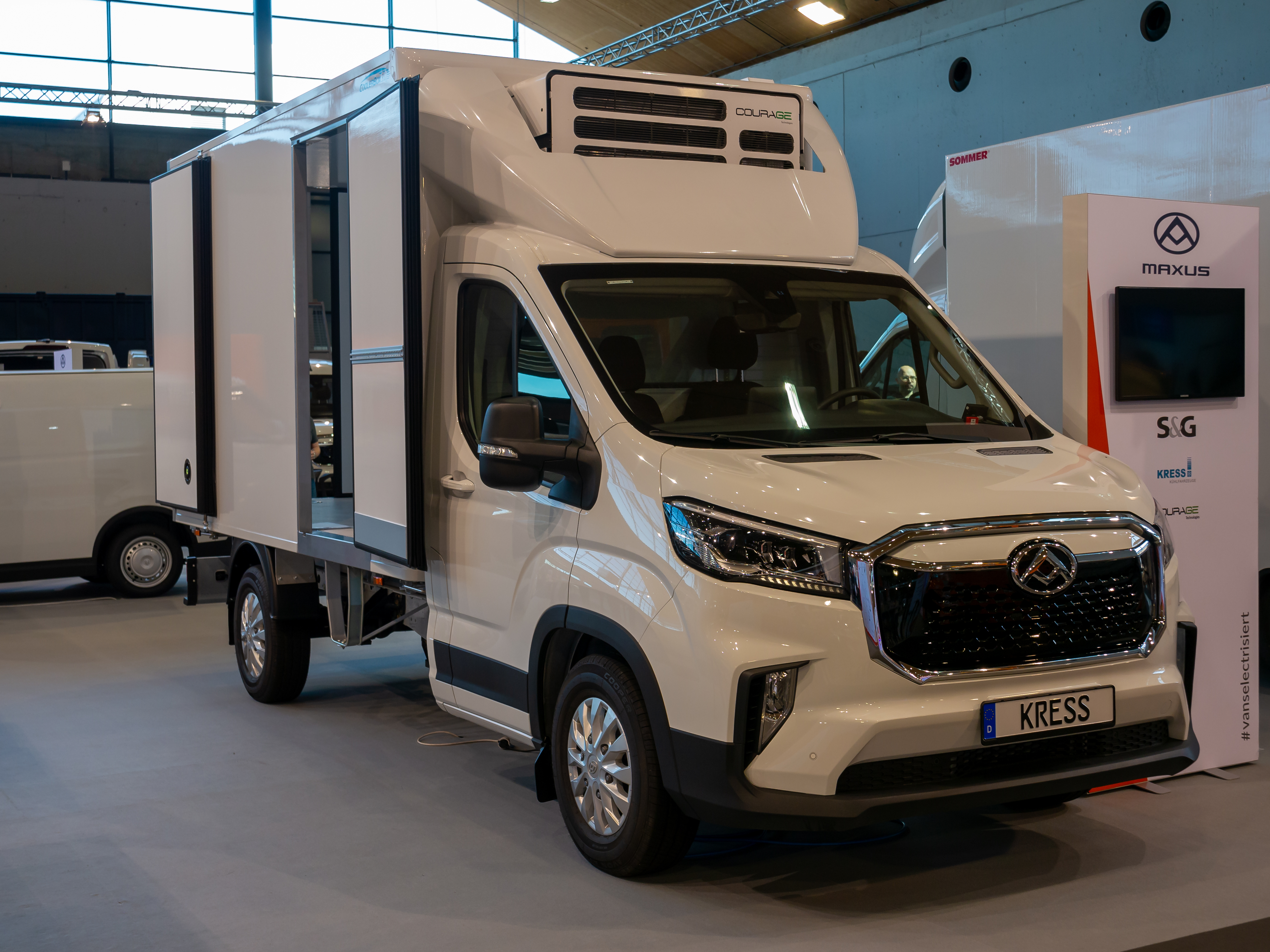
Deliver 9 box van

In March 2019, news of the patent about the Chinese company Shanghai Automotive Industry Corporation (SAIC) launching a new commercial vehicle model called the V90 under the Maxus brand broke out, and the Maxus V90 was later launched during the 2019 Shanghai Auto Show.

Maxus was formed following SAIC's acquisition of the intellectual property of LDV in 2010, and the first model of Maxus is the predecessor of the V90, the V80, which is a rebadged LDV Maxus. The LDV Maxus model was relaunched by SAIC as the V80 in June 2011.

At launch, the price range of the Maxus V90 ranges from 150,000 yuan to 290,000 yuan. The Maxus V90 is equipped with a 2.0 liter turbo diesel engine producing 150 horsepower and 375 N-m and fulfilling the National Standard VI Emission standard of China.

== Electric variant ==
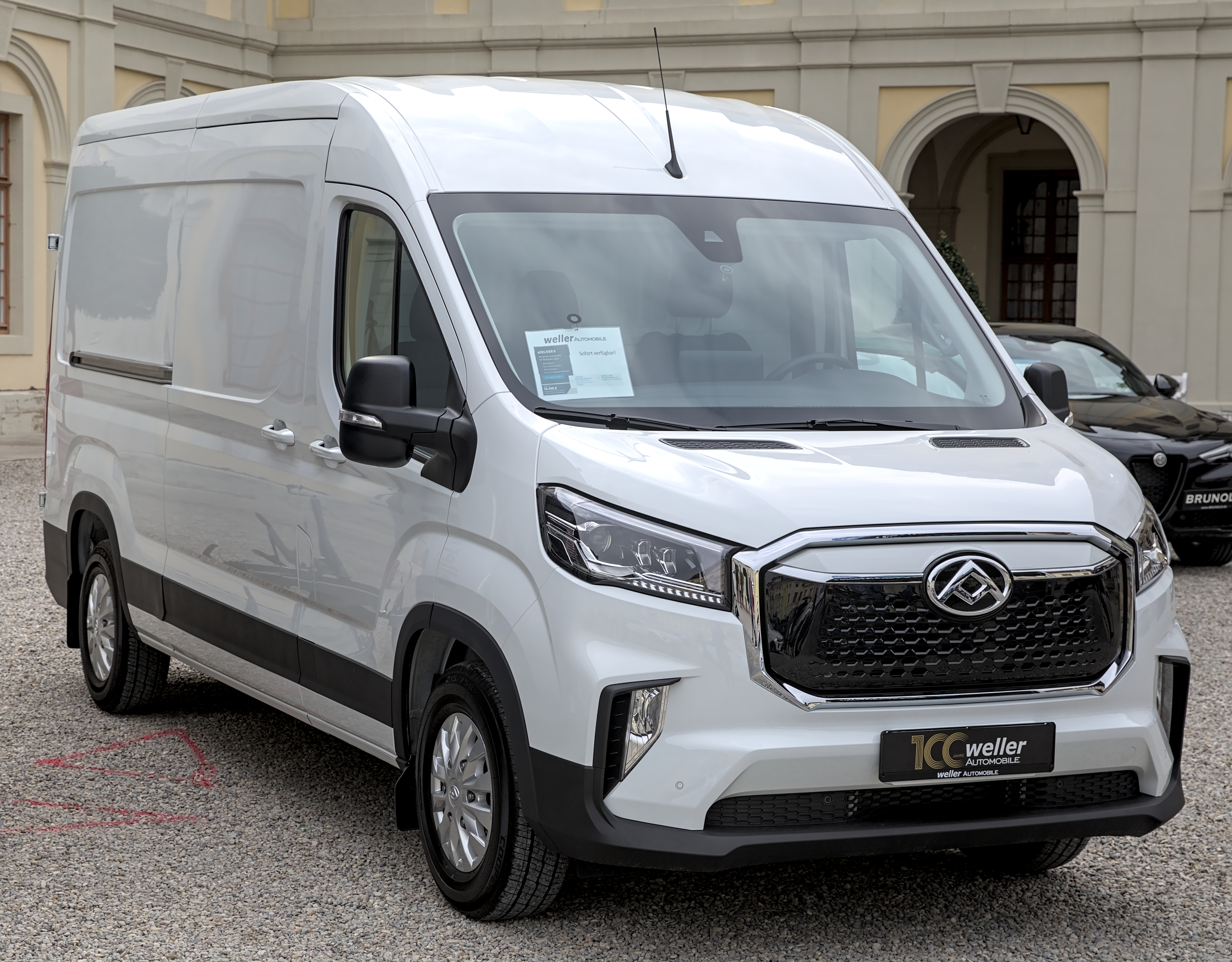
Maxus eDeliver 9

A fully electric variant of the vehicle is sold in Europe, including the UK & Ireland, as the Maxus eDeliver 9. It is not to be confused with the smaller Maxus eDeliver 3 or LDV eDeliver 7.

There are multiple battery size options: 51.5 kWh, 72 kWh or 88.5 kWh.

== Markets ==
In November 2022, the LDV eT60 and LDV eDeliver 9 were launched in Australia. In Australia the eDeliver 9 is limited to a top speed of 90 km/h.

== Powertrains ==
Engines
Model	Transmission	Engine	Displacement	Power	Torque	Emission standard	Fuel
SDEC SC20M 163 Q6A single-turbocharger	6-speed manual & automatic	I4	1,996 cc (2.0 L)	120 kW (163 PS; 161 bhp) at 4000 rpm	375 N⋅m (277 lb⋅ft) at 1500-2400 rpm	Euro 6b	Diesel
Electric motor	Automatic	Electric	-	150 kW (204 PS; 201 bhp) (FWD); 170 kW (231 PS; 228 bhp) (RWD)	310 N⋅m (229 lb⋅ft)	Zero emission	Electricity

== Safety ==
ANCAP test results LDV Deliver 9 diesel variants MY24 onwards (2024)
Overall
Grading:	74% (Gold)

Euro NCAP test results Maxus eDeliver 9 (2025)
Test	Score
Overall:	4 /5 stars
Safe driving	61%
Crash avoidance	71%
Post crash	80%

Euro NCAP test results Maxus eDeliver 9 (reassessed) (2025)
Test	Score
Overall:	5 /5 stars
Safe driving	66%
Crash avoidance	81%
Post crash	80%
