= Shanghai Automobile Gear Works =

Shanghai Automobile Gear Works Co., Ltd.
- Formerly: Zhengxingtai Auto Parts Factory
- Company type: State-owned
- Industry: Automotive components
- Founded: 1925; 101 years ago
- Headquarters: Shanghai, Jiading District, China
- Number of locations: 6 production sites in China (Shanghai, Shenyang, Shandong, Liuzhou, Jiangsu, Chongqing)
- Area served: China and international markets
- Key people: Qian Xiangyang (General Manager)
- Products: Manual transmissions, Automatic transmissions, EV/HEV transmissions, driveline systems
- Production output: Over 3.87 million units annually
- Services: Design, Research and development
- Revenue: CN¥12.8 billion (latest reported)
- Number of employees: Over 7,000 (as of latest data)
- Parent: SAIC Motor
- Divisions: Transmission R&D, Manufacturing, Testing Center, EV/HEV Driveline Systems
- Website: sagw.com

Shanghai Automobile Gear Works Co., Ltd. (SAGW) is a Chinese technology manufacturing company that supplies automotive transmissions and related components. It is headquartered in Shanghai and it is a wholly owned subsidiary of SAIC Motor. The company manufactures products for passenger vehicles, commercial vehicles, and new energy vehicles, with production facilities located in Shanghai, Shenyang, Shandong, Liuzhou, Jiangsu, and Chongqing.

== History ==
SAGW was originally established in 1925 under the name Zhengxingtai Auto Parts Factory. In 2015, the company relocated its headquarters to No. 600 Huiwang Road, Jiading District, Shanghai. As of the latest data, SAGW occupies a land area of approximately 910,000 square meters, with 460,000 square meters of built space, and owns fixed assets valued at approximately RMB 13.8 billion.

SAGW employs over 7,000 people and produces more than 3.87 million transmission units annually. The company reports annual sales revenue of approximately RMB 12.8 billion. It supplies components to both domestic and international automotive manufacturers, including SAIC-GM, SAIC Volkswagen, SAIC-GM-Wuling, Dongfeng Nissan, Dongfeng Motor Corporation, Zotye Auto, BAIC Motor, General Motors, and Ford Motor Company.

== Products ==
The company has developed over 100 transmission types across 21 platforms. Its research and production efforts focus on manual transmissions, dual-clutch transmissions (DCT), continuously variable transmissions (CVT), automated manual transmissions (AMT), and driveline systems for new energy vehicles. Key technologies under development include electronic shift (E-shift), electronic clutch (E-clutch), and electronic parking (E-park) systems.

=== Manual transmissions ===
- SH27G1 – A compact gear unit developed for specific drivetrain applications, with a center distance of 150 mm. It supports up to 270 N·m of torque and features a gear ratio of 11.07 at 16,000 rpm.
- SH32G1 – A compact gear unit developed for specific drivetrain applications, with a center distance of 185 mm. It supports up to 320 N·m of torque and features a gear ratio of 13.10 at 16,000 rpm.

==== Transverse manual transmissions ====
- SH13M5 – A 5-speed transmission with a 63 mm center distance. It supports a maximum input torque of 145 N·m at 6000 rpm. The unit weighs approximately 31 kg and has dimensions of 351×483×417 mm.
- SH17M5/M6 – Available in both 5- and 6-speed variants with a 67.5 mm center distance. It supports up to 180 N·m of input torque and weighs around 35 kg.
- SH20M6 – A 6-speed transmission with a 76.5 mm center distance, supporting a maximum input torque of 280 N·m. It weighs approximately 48 kg.
- SH36M6 – A 6-speed unit with an 87 mm center distance, rated for up to 330 N·m of input torque. The transmission weighs about 63 kg.

==== Longitudinal manual transmissions ====
- SC16M5 – A 5-speed transmission with a 69.5 mm center distance, designed to handle up to 180 N·m of torque.
- SC25M5 – A 5-speed unit with a 76 mm center distance, rated for 230 N·m of input torque. Available in both two-wheel and four-wheel drive configurations.
- SC36M6 – A 6-speed transmission with an 82 mm center distance, capable of handling up to 400 N·m of torque.
- SC48M6 – A 6-speed transmission with an 89 mm center distance and a torque capacity of 480 N·m.

=== Automatic transmissions ===
- SC80A6 – A 6-speed automatic transmission with a center distance of 91 mm, supporting a maximum input torque of 400 N·m.
- SC90A6 – A 6-speed automatic transmission featuring a center distance of 91 mm, capable of handling up to 450 N·m of input torque.
- SC90A8 – An 8-speed automatic transmission with a 91 mm center distance, designed for a maximum input torque of 500 N·m.
- SC180A6 – A 6-speed automatic transmission with a center distance of 91 mm, supporting input torques up to 600 N·m.
- SC200A6 – A 6-speed automatic transmission featuring a center distance of 91 mm, capable of handling a maximum input torque of 700 N·m.

=== BEV/HEV transmissions ===
- SH61D1 – A transmission developed for battery electric vehicles, with a center distance of 185 mm and a maximum input torque capacity of 260 N·m.
- SH70D1 – Designed for electric vehicle applications, this transmission has a center distance of 210 mm and supports up to 320 N·m of input torque.
- SH80D1 – A transmission for BEVs, featuring a center distance of 225 mm and a maximum input torque of 400 N·m.
- SH90D1 – Developed for electric vehicles, this transmission has a center distance of 240 mm and can handle input torques up to 500 N·m.
- SH130D1 – A transmission designed for high-performance electric vehicles, with a center distance of 270 mm and a maximum input torque capacity of 800 N·m.

== Research and Development ==
The company maintains a national-level technical and testing center and operates production lines for both manual and automatic transmissions. As of 2025, SAGW holds 180 patents and engages in research areas such as transmission performance development, durability testing, noise diagnostics, and calibration.

SAGW is implementing digital manufacturing strategies aligned with the "Made in China 2025" national initiative, utilizing systems such as PLM, ERP, and MES to support its industrial digitalization efforts. The company's R&D team consists of over 1000 engineers.
