= Shanghai New Power Automotive Technology =

Chinese automotive manufacturing company

Shanghai New Power Automotive Technology Co., Ltd
- Type: State-owned joint-stock company
- Traded as: SSE: 900920
- Industry: Automotive
- Founded: 1947; 79 years ago
- Headquarters: Shanghai, China
- Key people: Qian Jun (President)
- Products: Diesel engines
- Owner: SAIC Motor
- Website: www.sdec.com.cn

Shanghai New Power Automotive Technology Co., Ltd (SNAT) (formerly known as Shanghai Diesel Engine Co., Ltd. (SDEC); Chinese: 上海柴油机股份有限公司) is a Chinese diesel engine manufacturing company wholly owned by SAIC Motor. SDEC headquarters and main production facilities are located in Yangpu District, Shanghai. Founded as the Wusong Works organization in 1947, it was renamed Shanghai Diesel Engine Factory in 1953. SDEC was restructured into a stock-shared company in 1993.

In 1994, SDEC was the first company in China to receive ISO9001 certification. SDEC has also been awarded QS9000 and TS16949 certification conducted by TÜV Rheinland. In 2002 and 2005, SDEC was awarded the Golden Award of Quality for the 6CT natural gas engine, evaluated as the best engine by the World Passenger Car Association. In 2006, SDEC was awarded "Best Engine Manufacturer" by the World Passenger Car Association.

In 2021, SDE underwent "major asset restructuring" and was renamed Shanghai New Power Automotive Technology (SNAT).

== Products ==
=== Diesel engines ===
==== C Series ====
C series engines are based on the 3306-series diesel engine from Caterpillar Inc. In 2006, SDEC carried out upgrades in cooperation with FEV.

- SC11C
  - SC11CB184
  - SC11CB195
  - SC11CB200
  - SC11CB200.1
  - SC11CB220
  - SC11CB220.1
  - SC11CB220.2
  - SC11CB240
  - SC11CB240.1
  - SC11CB270

==== D Series ====
The D series engine was jointly designed by SDEC and AVL (Austria) based on domestic fuel quality and user habits. In 2005, SDEC carried out a redesign and 4-valve upgrade in cooperation with the Southwest Research Institute (SwRI) of the USA.

- SC8D
- SC9D
- D683

==== E Series ====
The E series engine was jointly designed by SDEC and AVL (Austria).

- SC10E
- SC12E

==== G Series ====
The G series marine engine is based on the 3128 Xinlong diesel engine jointly designed by SDEC and AVL.

- G128
- SC13G
- SC15G

==== H Series ====
Engines jointly designed and developed by SDEC and UK-based Ricardo plc.

- SC4H
- SC7H

==== M Series ====
Light-duty truck engines jointly developed with Volkswagen.

===== SC20M (SAIC D20) =====
The SC20M engine series—also referred to as the SAIC "π" engine family—is a line of 2.0-liter, inline-four, direct-injection turbocharged diesel engines developed by SAIC Motor. The SC20M series is primarily utilized in SAIC Maxus commercial and utility vehicles and is offered in multiple performance variants. These engines are engineered for both two-wheel and four-wheel drive applications. The SC20M architecture is based on the Volkswagen EA288 modular diesel engine platform. The engines are designed to comply with Euro 5 & 6 emission standards.

SC20M Engines
Model	Emission standard	Configuration	Displacement	Power	Torque	Notes
SC20M163	Q6A (Euro 6a)	I4	1,996 cc (2.0 L)	120 kW (163 PS; 161 bhp) at 4000 rpm	375 N⋅m (277 lb⋅ft) at 1500–2400 rpm	
SC20M163	Q6B (Euro 6b)	I4	1,996 cc (2.0 L)	120 kW (163 PS; 161 bhp) at 4000 rpm	410 N⋅m (302 lb⋅ft) at 1500–2400 rpm	
SC20M218	Q6A (Euro 6a)	I4	1,996 cc (2.0 L)	160 kW (218 PS; 215 bhp) at 4000 rpm	480 N⋅m (354 lb⋅ft) at 1500-2400 rpm	Bi-turbo
SC20M218	Q6B (Euro 6b)	I4	1,996 cc (2.0 L)	160 kW (218 PS; 215 bhp) at 4000 rpm	500 N⋅m (369 lb⋅ft) at 1500–2400 rpm	Bi-turbo

==== R Series ====
Engines based on a VM Motori license.

- SC25R
- SC28R

==== T Series ====
===== SC25T =====
The SC25T is a 2.5L turbocharged and intercooled diesel engine developed by SAIC, designed for new Maxus vehicles. Featuring a four-stroke design with a 16:1 compression ratio, the engine delivers a rated power output of 165 kW at 3,800 rpm and a peak torque of 525 Nm between 1,500 and 2,500 rpm. The engine's bore and stroke measure 88.3 mm and 102 mm respectively, and it operates with an idle speed of 775 ±25 rpm. It is designed to meet China's National VI emission standards (Based on Euro 6).

SC25T Engines
Model	Emission standard	Configuration	Displacement	Power	Torque	Notes
SC25T	Euro 6	I4	2,498 cc (2.5 L)	165 kW (224 PS; 221 bhp) at 3800 rpm	525 N⋅m (387 lb⋅ft) at 1500–2500 rpm	Turbocharged and intercooled

==== W Series ====
Marine engine with 4 valves per cylinder, mechanical governor, and P11 high-pressure fuel injection.

- SC33W

=== Diesel generator sets ===
All sets come equipped with an auto-starting device and an optional ATS switch cabinet.

==== D series ====
Powered by D series diesel engines.

- SD-SC200
- SD-SC250

==== E series ====
Powered by E series diesel engines.

- SD-SC325

==== G series ====
Powered by G series diesel engines.

- SD-SC313
- SD-SC375
- SD-SC450
- SD-SC500
- SD-SC563
- SD-SC625
- SD-SC682

==== H series ====
Powered by H series diesel engines.

- SD-SC63
- SD-SC80
- SD-SC100
- SD-SC125
- SD-SC150
- SD-SC188

==== SR series ====
Powered by SR series diesel engines.

- D500MG
- D540MG
- D600MG
- D800MG
- D1000MG
- D1100MG
- D1200MG
- D1360MG
- D1500MG
- D1600MG

==== W series ====
Powered by W series diesel engines.

- SD-SC750
