= Iveco =

Italian commercial vehicle manufacturing company

Iveco Group N.V.
- Logo used since 2023

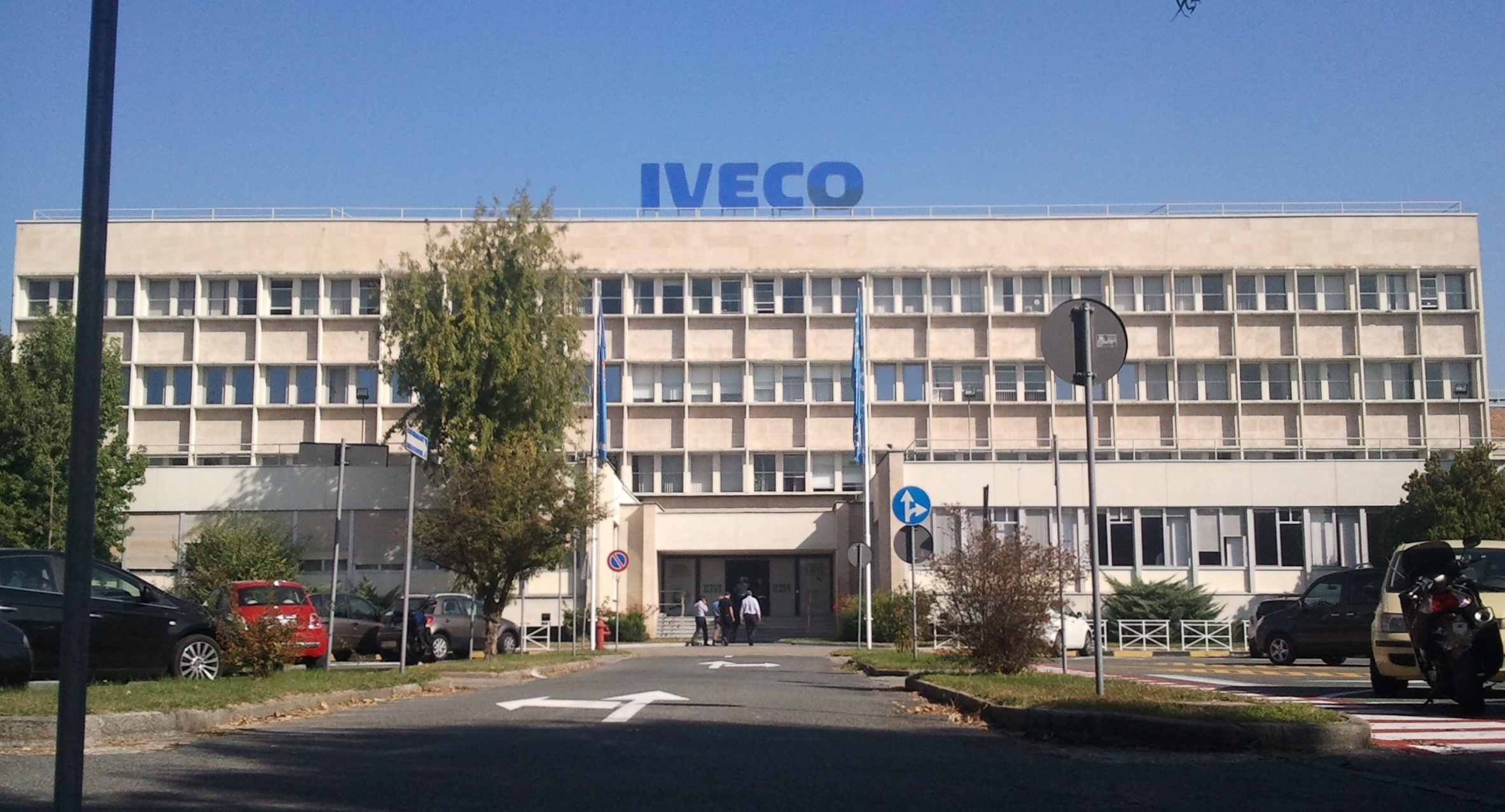
- Headquarters (with old logo) in Turin, Italy
- Type: Public
- Traded as: BIT: IVG; FTSE MIB
- Industry: Automotive
- Founded: 1 January 1975; 51 years ago
- Headquarters: Turin, Italy
- Area served: Worldwide
- Key people: Olof Persson (CEO)
- Products: Vans; Trucks; Buses
- Revenue: ▲€16,000,000,000 (2026)
- Owner: Tata Motors (89.42%)
- Number of employees: Approximately 34,000 (2021)
- Parent: Tata Motors
- Subsidiaries: Iveco Bus; Naveco (50%); Iveco S.p.A; FPT Industrial; SAIC-Iveco FPT Hongyan
- Website: iveco.com

Iveco Group N.V. is the holding company of Iveco S.p.A., an acronym for Industria Veicoli Commerciali or Industrial Vehicles Corporation, an Italian multinational transport vehicle manufacturing company with headquarters in Turin, Italy. It designs and builds light, medium, and heavy commercial vehicles. The Iveco name first appeared in 1975 after a merger of Italian, French, and German brands. Its production plants are in Europe, China, Australia and Latin America and it has about 5,000 sales and service outlets in over 160 countries. The worldwide output of the company amounts to around 150,000 commercial vehicles, with a turnover of about €10 billion.

The company was spun off from CNH Industrial on 1 January 2022. The holding company is incorporated in Amsterdam, Netherlands, and is listed on Borsa Italiana under the ticker symbol IVG.

On 30 July 2025, Iveco announced the sale of its commercial vehicle business to Indian company Tata Motors and its defence business to Leonardo.

== History ==
Iveco (stylized in all caps as IVECO) was incorporated on 1 January 1975, with the merger of five different brands: Fiat Veicoli Industriali (with headquarters in Turin), OM (Brescia, Italy), Lancia Veicoli Speciali (Italy), Unic (France), and Magirus-Deutz (Germany).

Following the merger, the newly founded Iveco began rationalizing its product range, manufacturing plants, and sales network, while keeping the original brands. From 1975 to 1979, the Iveco range included 200 basic models and 600 versions spanning from 2.7 tons of GVW for light vehicles to over 40 tons for heavy vehicles, as well as buses and engines.

In 1977, the light- to medium-weight Iveco Zeta range was introduced, replacing the 20-year-old OM Lupetto. Integrating the Fiat-OM range with the Unic and Magirus lineups was completed by 1980. IVECO moved in to work on increasing productivity and engine development. In 1978, IVECO launched the first product in the range of IVECO-branded light vehicles, the Daily.

In 1980, Iveco built a turbo diesel engine for heavy industrial vehicles. In 1984, Iveco launched the TurboStar, a heavy on-road vehicle that became a best-seller in Italy and also successful in the European market, selling a total of 50,000 units in seven years. In 1985, Iveco made the first light diesel engine with direct injection.

From 1986, Iveco S.p.A. held a 52% stake in Iveco Ford Truck Ltd, a joint venture (and effectively a merger) with Ford of Europe's truck division. Ford plants took over production and sales of the major vehicles in the Iveco range and continued production of the Ford Cargo. In the mid-1980s, Astra Veicoli Industriali, which produces dumpers and construction site/quarry vehicles in Piacenza, became part of Iveco Group. In 1989, the first Diesel engine with EGR to reduce polluting emissions compatible with commercial vehicles was produced, and the new Daily launched that same year was fitted with it.

In 1990, the group purchased 60% control of Spanish industrial company ENASA, which owned the industrial vehicle builder Pegaso. In the 1990s, the EuroCargo, EuroTech, EuroTrakker, and EuroStar vehicles represented a total facelift for the range. The EuroCargo and the EuroTech were named "Truck of the Year" in 1992 and 1993, respectively, and for the first time, this recognition was awarded to the same manufacturer for two years in a row. English company Seddon Atkinson was purchased in 1991 and brought its long heritage of special vehicles for the construction and refuse-collection industries. That same year, the first TurboDaily assembly line was inaugurated at the Nanjing Motor Corporation in China. In 1991, Iveco announced it was withdrawing from the North American market at the end of the year; they had been selling the midrange Iveco Z/Euro there since 1978. In 1992, Iveco took over the primary constructor of industrial vehicles in Australia to form Ital, originally called International Trucks Australia. In 1996 firefighting activities in Germany were structured under the company Iveco Magirus Brandschutztechnik GmbH. The following year, these activities were boosted by the arrival of an Austrian company, Löhr, which then became Löhr Magirus. In 1998, the Cursor 8 was launched, followed the next year by the Cursor 10, the first diesel engine with a variable-geometry turbine and the first common-rail diesel engine for heavy industrial vehicles. The 125th anniversary of the presentation of the first Magirus ladder was celebrated together with the delivery of the 5000th Magirus aerial ladder produced since the Second World War. Magirus was sold to investment group Matares SE in 2024.

In 2000, it was renamed Iveco Trucks Australia Limited. In 2003, Iveco entirely bought out Irisbus, originally part of a joint venture with Renault. In 2004, the Iveco Motors brand was introduced, which became an umbrella for the production of engines; the following year, it was incorporated into the newly founded Fiat Powertrain Technologies. At the end of 2004, an agreement was reached between Iveco and the Chinese company SAIC Motor to form SAIC Iveco Hongyan.

On 1 January 2011, Fiat Industrial was formed, incorporating CNH, Iveco, and FPT Industrial. In September of the same year, the Fiat Industrial Village was inaugurated in Turin, a multipurpose centre belonging to Fiat Industrial and created for the sales, assistance, and product presentation for the Iveco, New Holland, and FPT Industrial brands.

On 11 November 2021, Iveco published the prospectus in order to split from CNH Industrial which will be operated as a publicly separated company named Iveco Group N.V. After the completion of the demerger, on 1 January 2022 Iveco became a part of Iveco Group N.V., the parent company of the trucks and speciality vehicles, powertrain and related financial services businesses previously held by CNH Industrial. As of 2023, the company forms part of the Dow Jones Sustainability Indices.

On 30 July 2025, Iveco announced the sale of its defence businesses, consisting of the IDV and Astra brands, to Leonardo. The remaining commercial vehicle business will be sold to Tata Motors. Both transactions were completed in October 2026.

== Main shareholders ==
The main shareholders of Iveco Group on 3 April 2025 are:

| Name | % |
|---|---|
| Giovanni Agnelli B.V. | 27.06% |
| Norges Bank | 8.91% |
| Own shares | 2.55% |

== Corporate leadership ==
=== Iveco (1975–2021) ===
- Bruno Beccaria (1975–1990)
- Giancarlo Boschetti (1990–2002)

=== Iveco Group N.V (2022–present) ===
- Gerrit Marx (2022–2024)
- Olof Persson (2024–present)

== Facilities ==
Iveco has 27 production plants and 6 research centres located in 16 countries. Outside of Europe, the company operates in China, Russia, Australia (factory ceased production in June 2022), South Africa and Latin America. All the plants have obtained ISO 9001-vision 2000 (quality management by process) and ISO 14000 (environmental management) certification.

== Emissions and alternative fuels ==
=== Euro VI engines with SCR technology ===
Iveco engines from the Cursor and Tector ranges observe the Euro VI standards by adopting High Efficiency SCR (HI-eSCR) technology. This technology optimises the processes of exhaust combustion and after-treatment, reducing consumption and enabling achievement of greater efficiency in the conversion of NOx emissions.

=== Electric drive ===
Iveco developed and built the first Daily with electric propulsion in 1986; Later, the range was broadened to include trucks and city buses. Iveco introduced the New Daily with electric propulsion and zero exhaust emissions, in which a battery system powers an electric three-phase asynchronous motor – through the aid of an inverter – in charge of moving the vehicle directly while recovering energy during braking. The vehicle runs on two to four batteries made with Na/NiCl2 (sodium-nickel chlorine) technology at a nominal 278 Volts. The maximum velocity is electronically limited to 70 km/h, while the vehicle's range is from 90 to 130 km on a fully charged battery, depending on the number of batteries and the mission.

=== Diesel-electric parallel hybrid traction ===
The parallel hybrid solution incorporates both a diesel engine and an electric motor that can be used individually or simultaneously, which makes for greater operating flexibility and allows the vehicle to work under both urban and non-urban conditions. In 2010 Iveco introduced this technology on the Eurocargo Ibrido, a commercial vehicle for the European market with electri-diesel parallel propulsion for distributing and collecting goods in city centres. The payload capacity decreases by 200 kg in comparison to diesel-engine models, but it is possible to save up to 30% on the urban cycle. The Eurocargo hybrid range is made up of two versions:

- The 7.5-ton version uses a Tector Diesel FPT Industrial engine with 16 valves and 4 Euro V cylinders, with a maximum power of 160 hp (118 kW); this is paired with a drive system made of an electric motor-generator with 60 hp (44 kW), a 6-speed automated gearbox and a lithium-ion battery pack (Li-Ion) of rated capacity 1.8 kWh.
- The 12-ton version uses the FPT Industrial Tector engine with 16 valves and 4 EEV cylinders with a maximum power of 180 hp (132 kW), paired with an electric motor-generator with 60 hp (44 kW), a 6-speed automated gearbox and a lithium-ion battery pack (Li-Ion) of rated capacity 1.8 kWh.

=== Diesel-electric hybrid ===
Iveco has been active in this sector since 1990 with 6, 7, 4 and 12 metre buses for urban and suburban transportation. The series hybrid technology features a diesel engine – smaller than that of a traditional vehicle – that acts as a battery charger.

=== CNG – compressed natural gas ===
Iveco's range of light, medium and heavy vehicles and buses can run on methane. Methane makes it possible to save on consumption by 38% per kg transported as compared to that consumed by diesel engines for the same payload and distance travelled. In addition, compared to Euro VI diesel engines, methane engines reduce NOx emissions by approximately 60% and particulate emissions by approximately 70%.

=== Liquefied natural gas ===
In April 2012 Iveco presented its first vehicle with this technology, the Stralis LNG. As opposed to vehicles with compressed natural gas (CNG) technology, liquefied natural gas (LNG) technology takes the vehicle farther on a full tank (up to 750 km) and reduces the vehicle's tare thus increasing the load. The main difference between the two technologies lies in the type of natural gas storage employed, which in this case is kept in a liquid state at −161 °C in cryogenic tanks; it is then heated in a heat exchanger so that once it reaches the engine it is a gas. Also, the noise emitted decreases by 3 to 6 decibels over an analogous diesel engine vehicle.

=== Iveco Trakker Bifuel – diesel-ethanol prototype ===
Iveco created the first prototype of a bifuel, diesel and ethanol-run vehicle. The technology was developed by Iveco together with FPT Industrial and Bosch. The prototype uses a Trakker truck with Common Rail Cursor 9 engine with 360 HP that may be powered by a 40–60% ethanol-diesel blend. The prototype was tested by Raízen, a joint venture between the cane sugar producer Cosan and Shell. In 2011, this prototype earned Iveco the "Prêmio Top Etanol" – for the alternative fuel technology.

=== Heating and air-conditioning systems ===
A prototype of a heat pump system for electric and hybrid vehicles was installed on the Iveco Daily vehicle. The system cools or heats the passenger compartment by transferring low-temperature heat generated by the drive systems. At the same time, the control strategies minimise the energy demand in order to achieve a low impact on consumption.

== Iveco vehicles ==
The brand's range of products include the Daily, a vehicle that covers the 3.3 – 7.2 ton vehicle weight segment, the Eurocargo from 6 – 19 tons and, in the heavy segment above 16 tons, the Iveco Way range with the on-road Iveco S-Way, the off-road Iveco T-Way and the Iveco X-Way for light off-road missions.

In 2023, Iveco announced their new Driveway Bodybuilder Programme, allowing customers to have a choice of stock tippers and tipper grabs available on X-Way chassis.

=== Current models ===
==== Commercial vehicles ====
- Acco
- Daily
- eDaily
- eJolly
- eMoovy
- eSuperJolly
- EuroCargo
- Fidato
- S-Way
- T-Way
- X-Way
- Tector

==== Military (Iveco Defence Vehicles) ====
- B1 Centauro
- GFF4
- Guarani
- LMV
- MTV
- NJ-series
- SuperAV
- VM 90

=== Former models ===
- Campagnola
- CityClass
- Effeuno
- EuroClass
- EuroRider
- EuroStar
- EuroTrakker
- Massif
- MyWay
- PowerStar
- Stralis
- T-series
- TurboCity
- Trakker
- X-series
- Zeta

== Sponsorships ==
Iveco sponsored the 1980 Olympic Games in Moscow, the Davis Cup in 1982, the 1982 FIFA World Cup, the Jacques Cousteau expeditions in the Amazon basin in 1983 and the Raid Pigafetta, during which the Iveco-Fiat 75 PC 4x4 was first to make a full circle of the globe. Two new divisions were also formed: bus diesel engines and firefighting vehicles. It also sponsored the first of two fights between Sugar Ray Leonard and Tommy Hearns and between Aaron Pryor and Alexis Argüello.

In 2006, Iveco sponsored the 2006 Winter Olympic Games in Turin with a fleet of 1,200 Irisbus buses. The year after, Iveco became sponsor of the All Blacks, New Zealand's rugby team. In 2009, Iveco became the truck and commercial vehicle supplier for the Moto GP, together with the historical sponsorship to the Scuderia Ferrari.

Iveco won the 2012 Dakar Rally with the Petronas De Rooy team and Dutch driver Gerard De Rooy, behind the wheel of an Iveco Powerstar. De Rooy was followed by drivers Stacey and Biasion behind the wheel of two Iveco Trakker Evolution 2 vehicles, equipped with an FPT Industrial C13 engine with over 900 hp. De Rooy won the 2016 Dakar Rally for Iveco, whereas Janus van Kasteren won the 2023 Dakar Rally.

== Gallery ==
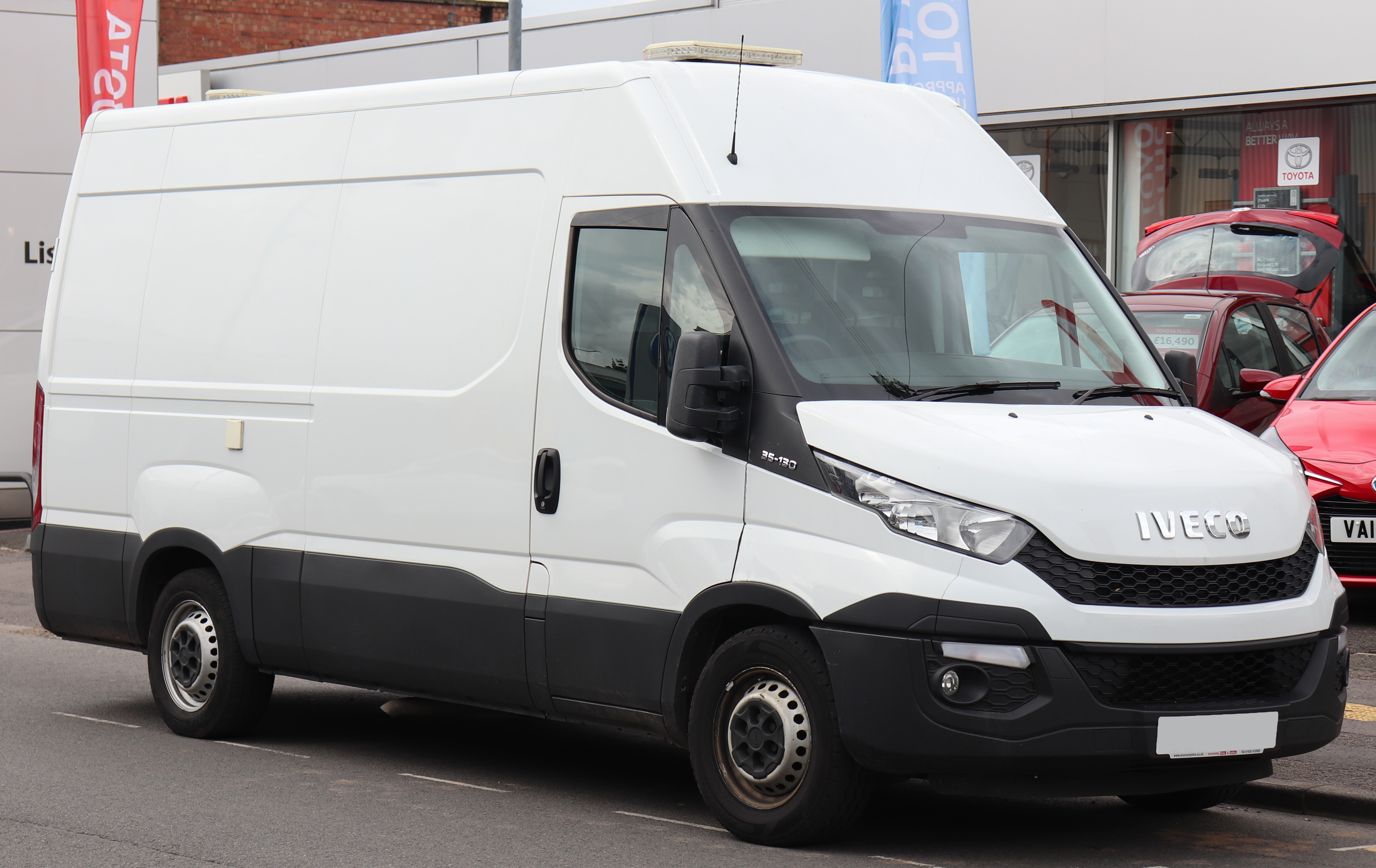
2014 Iveco Daily 35 S13 Van

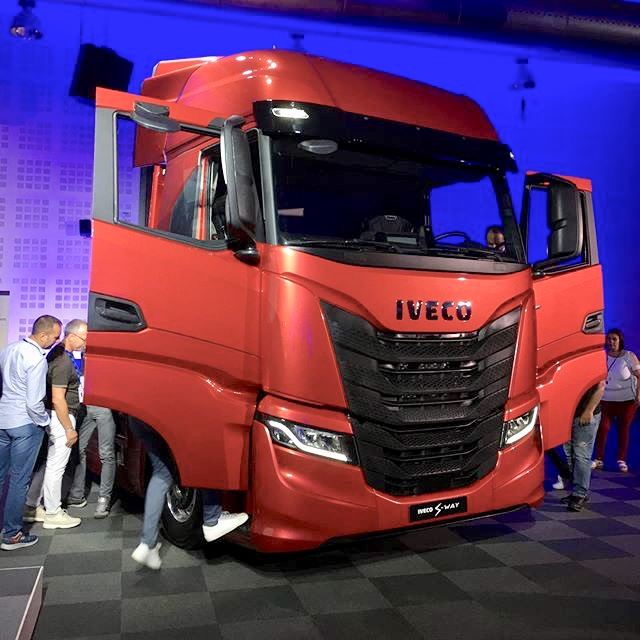
2019 Iveco S-Way

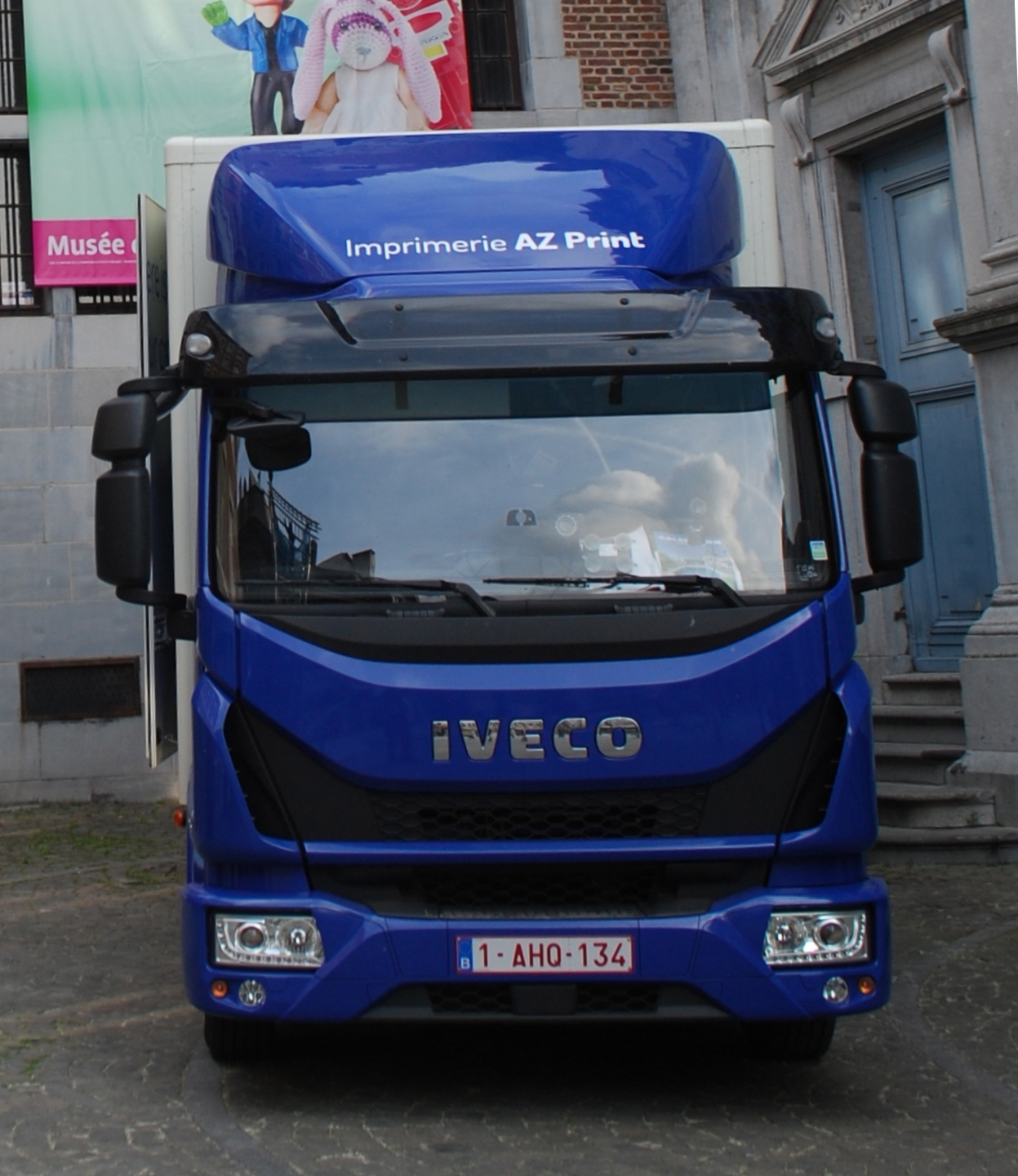
2015 Iveco Eurocargo

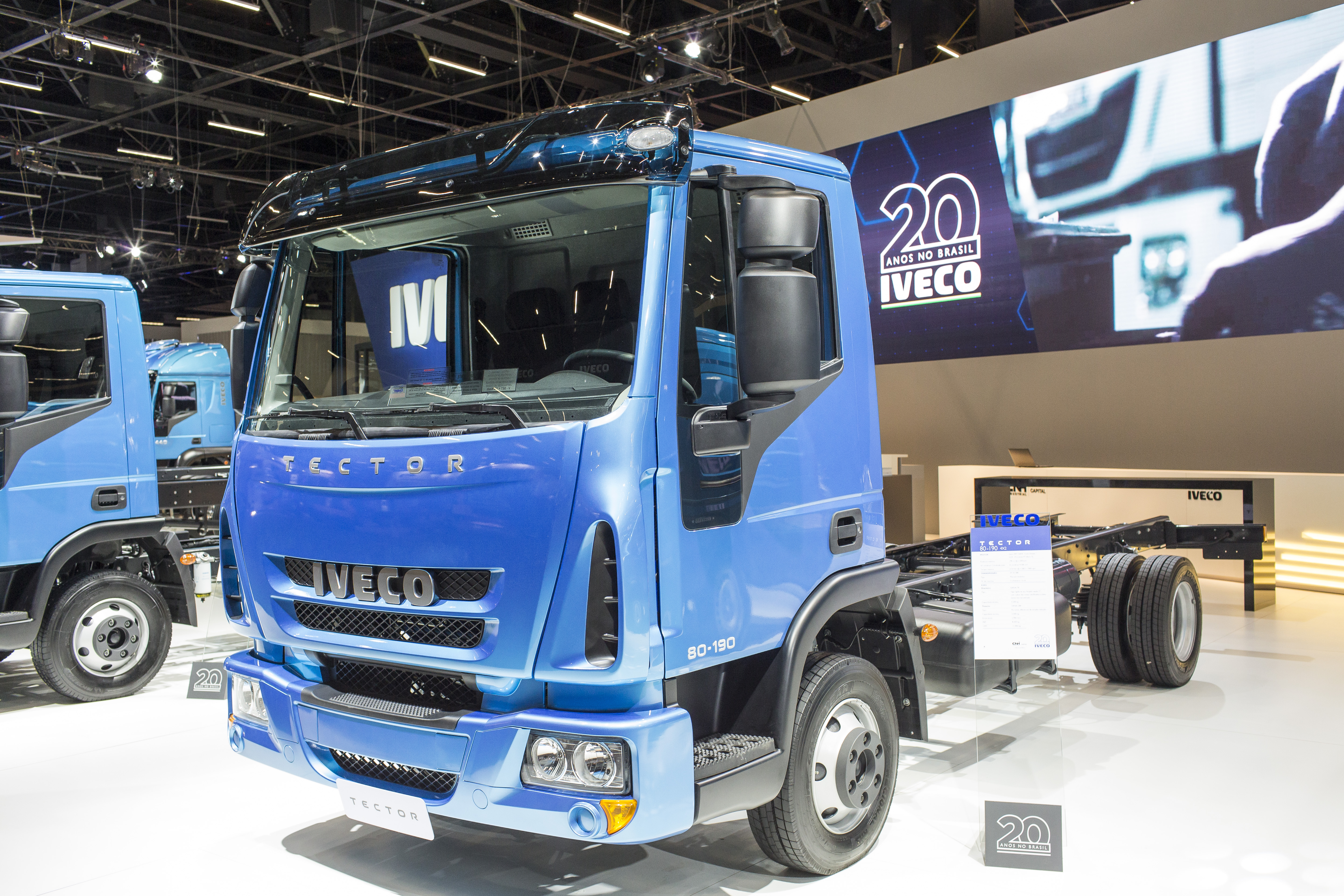
2017 Iveco Tector

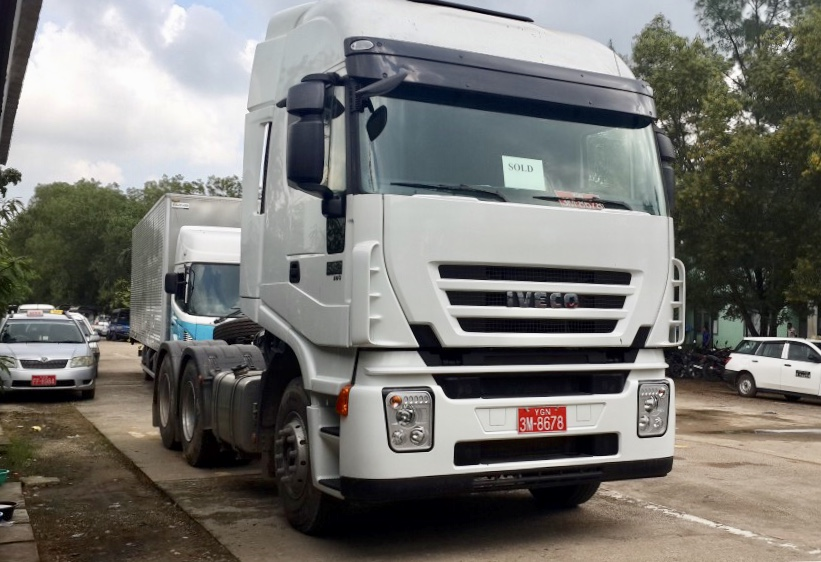
2018 Iveco 682

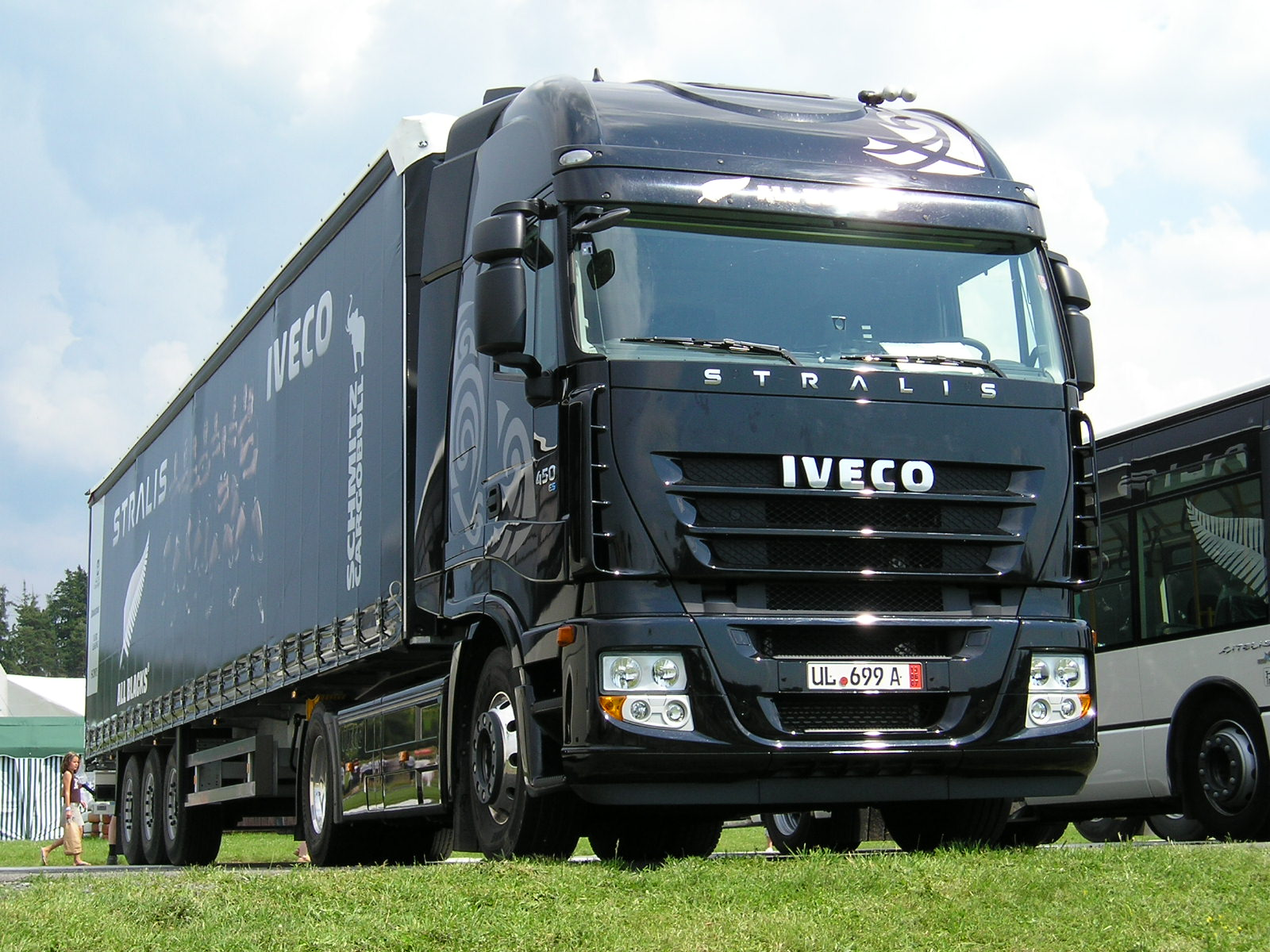
2007 Iveco Stralis

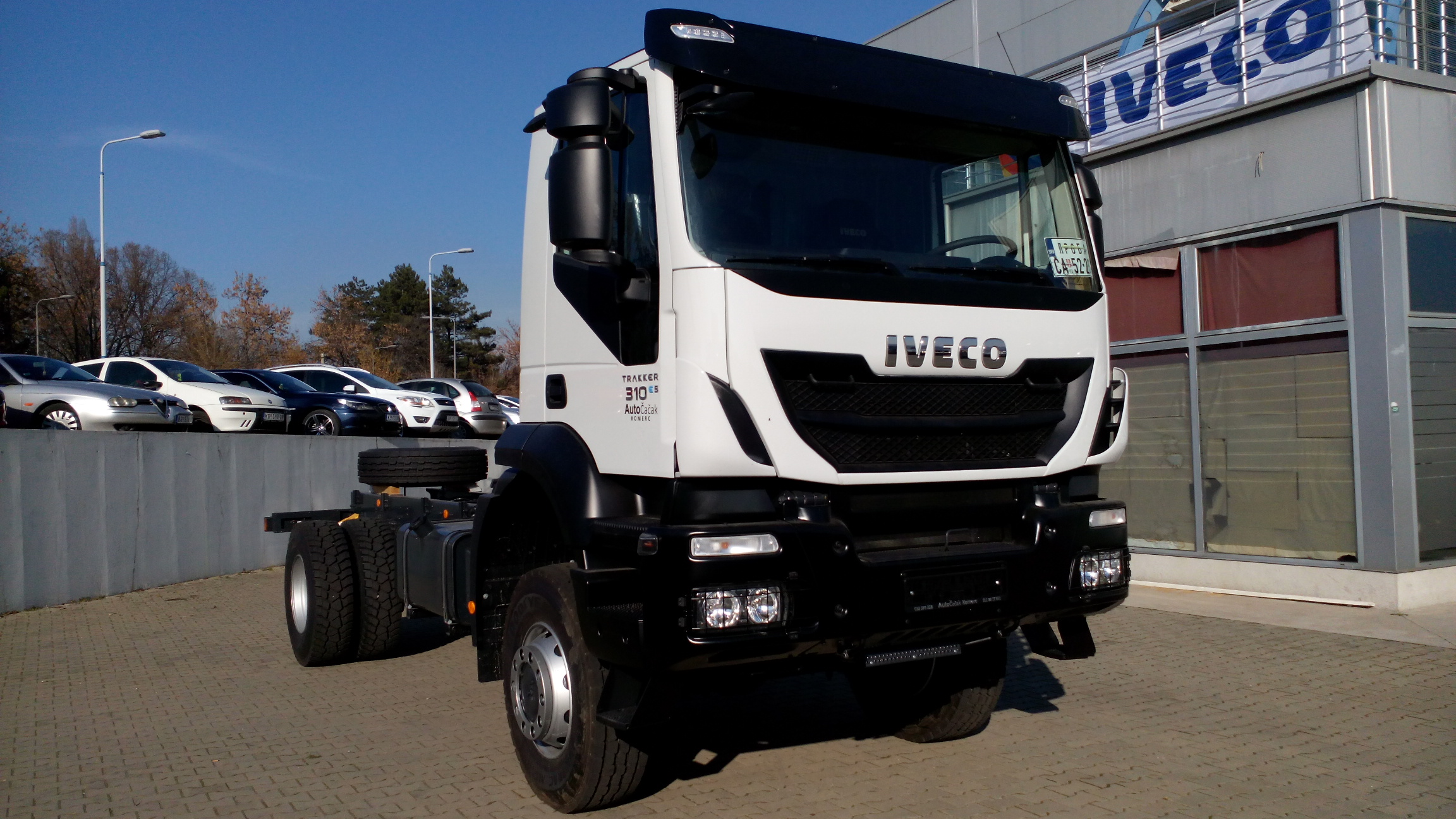
2016 Iveco Trakker

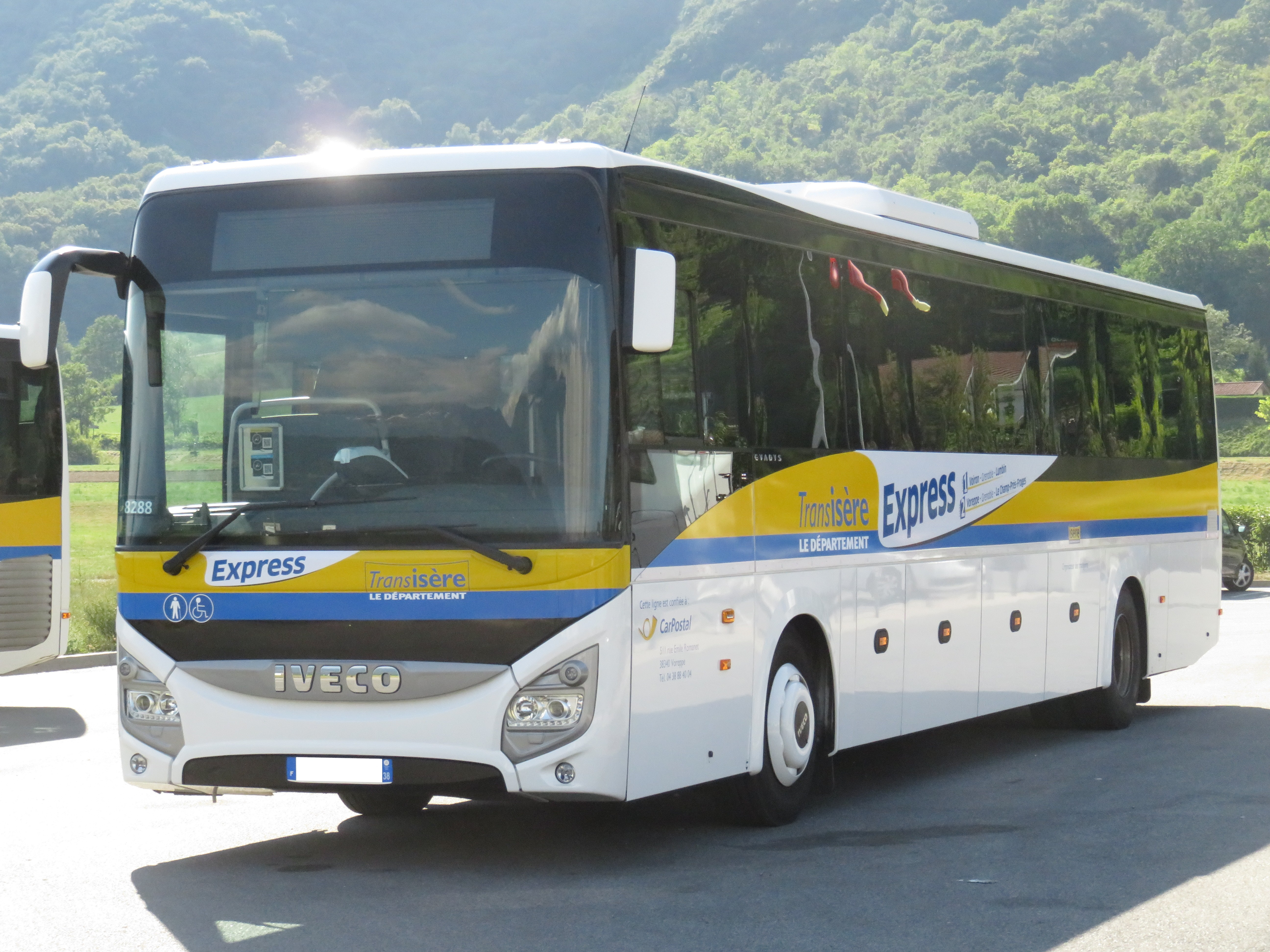
2016 Iveco Bus Evadys

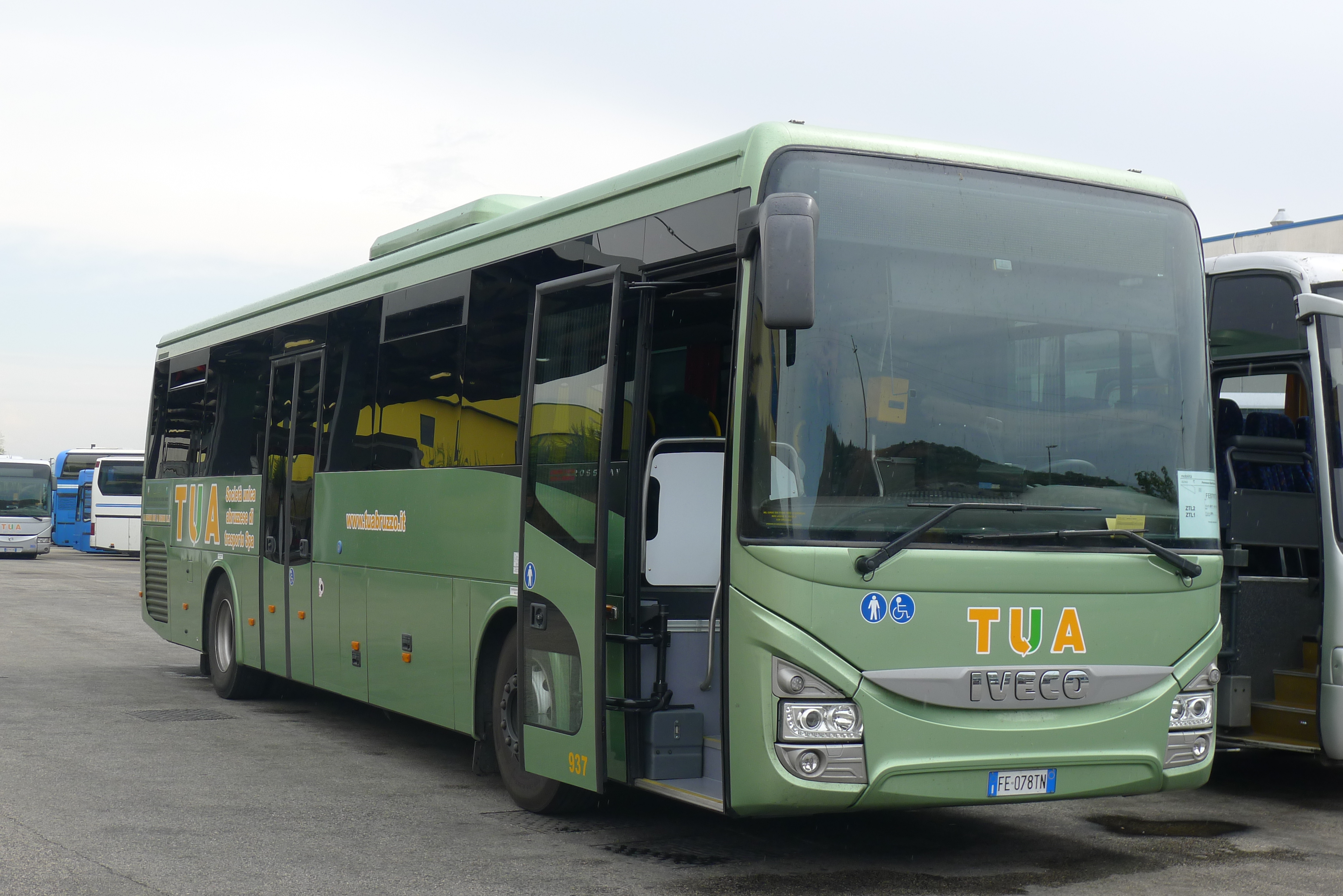
2017 Iveco Bus Crossway

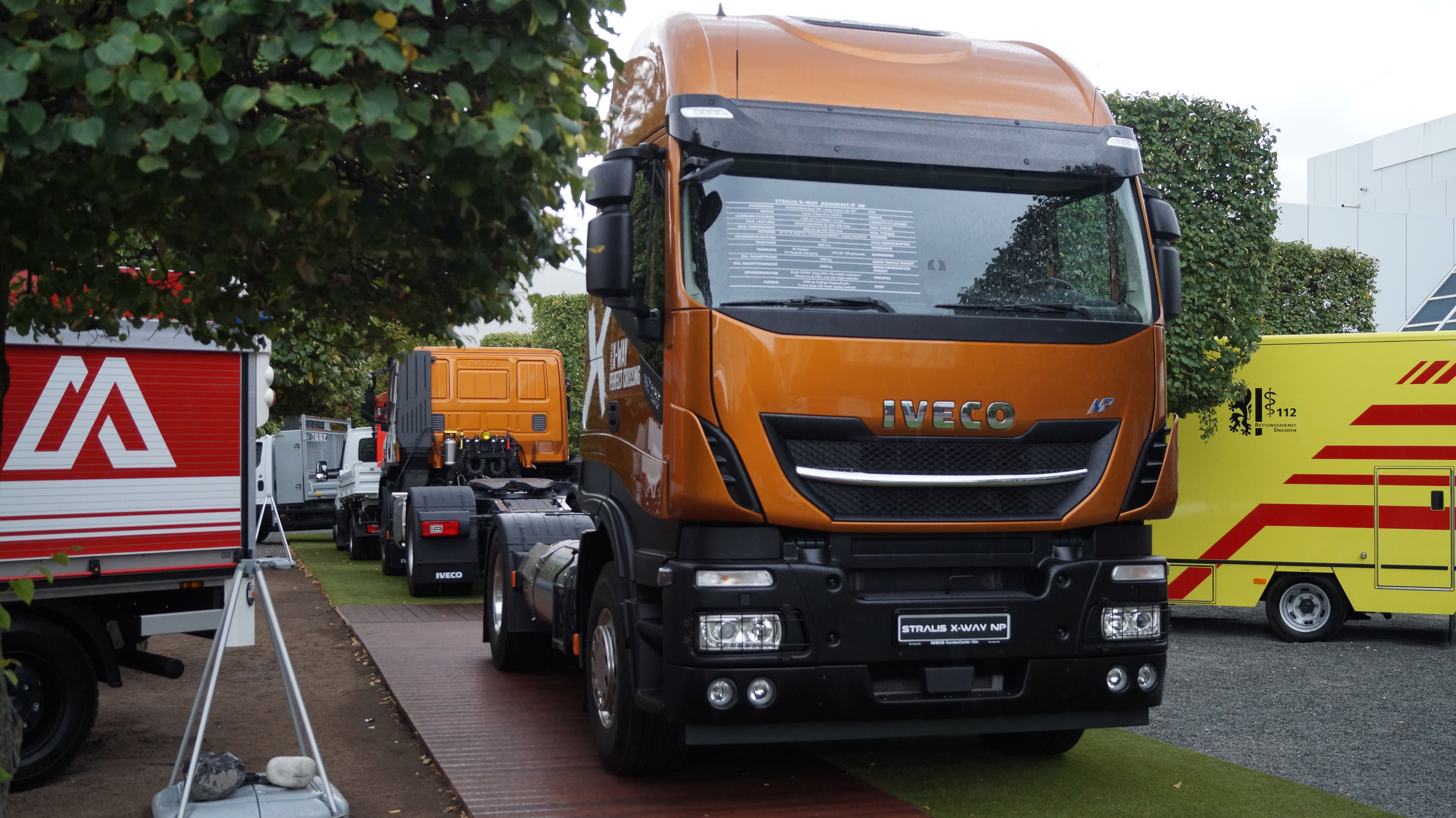
2018 Iveco Stralis X-Way

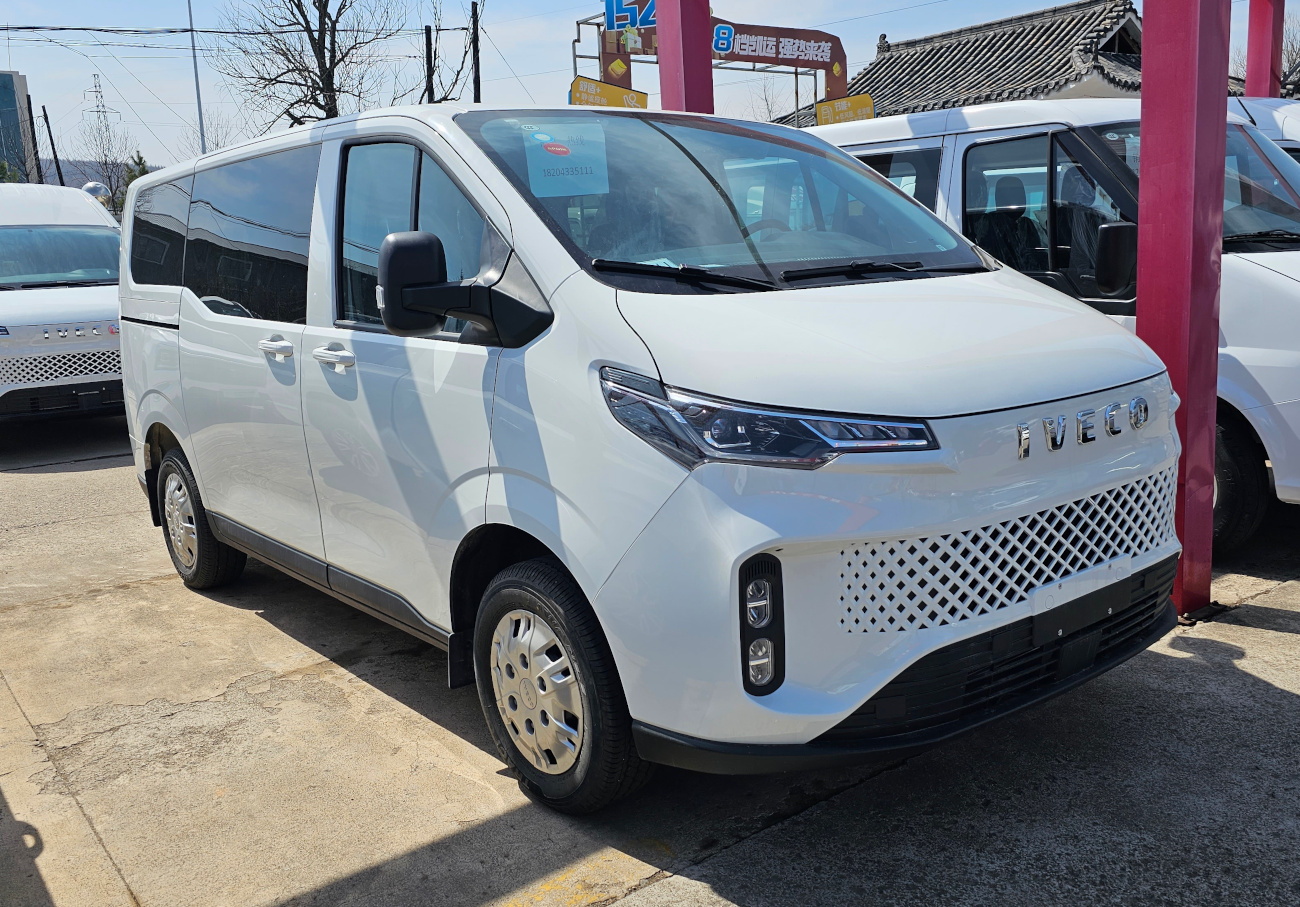
2023 Iveco Fidato

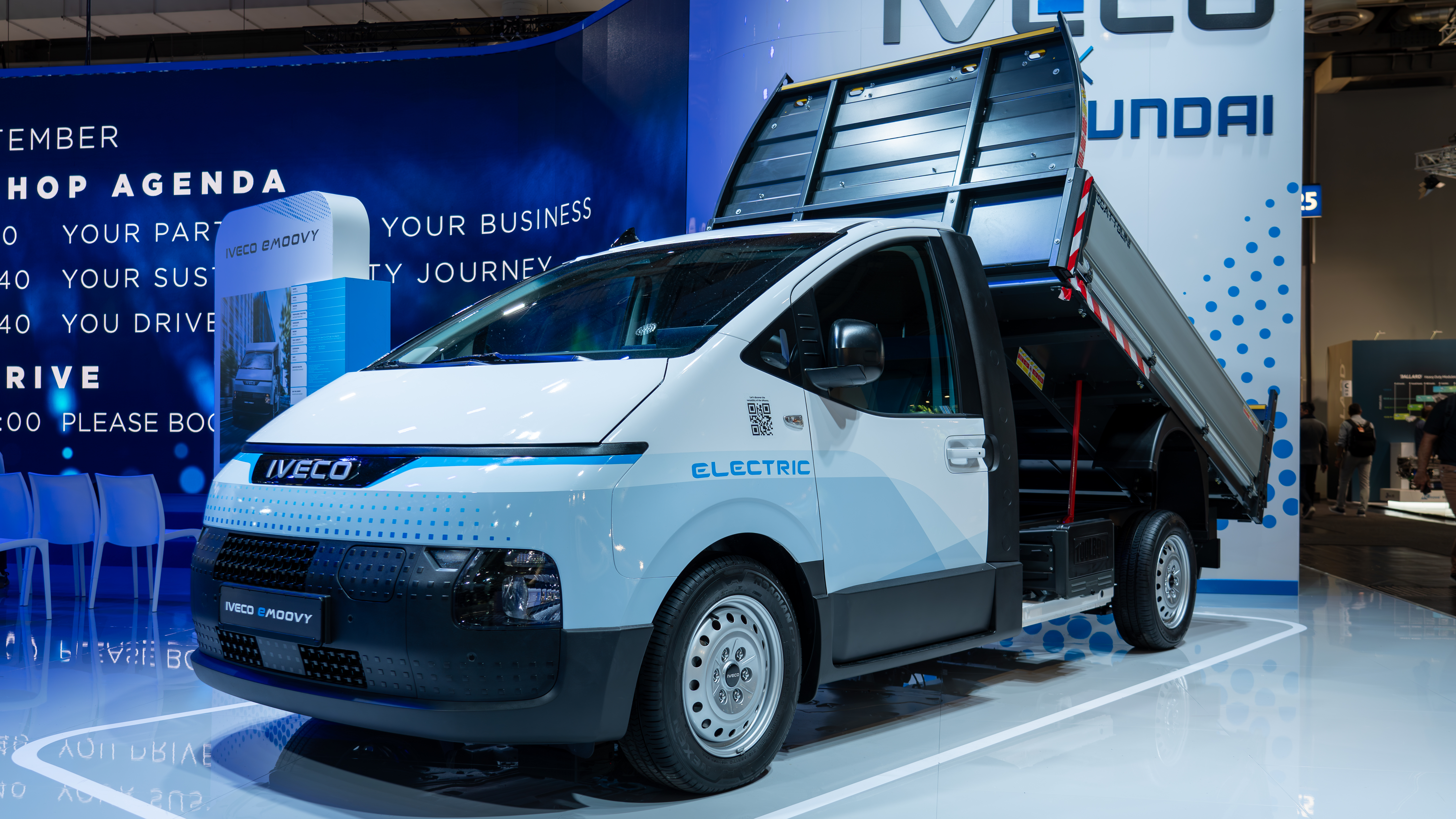
2025 Iveco eMoovy
