= Iveco Stralis =

Heavy-duty truck

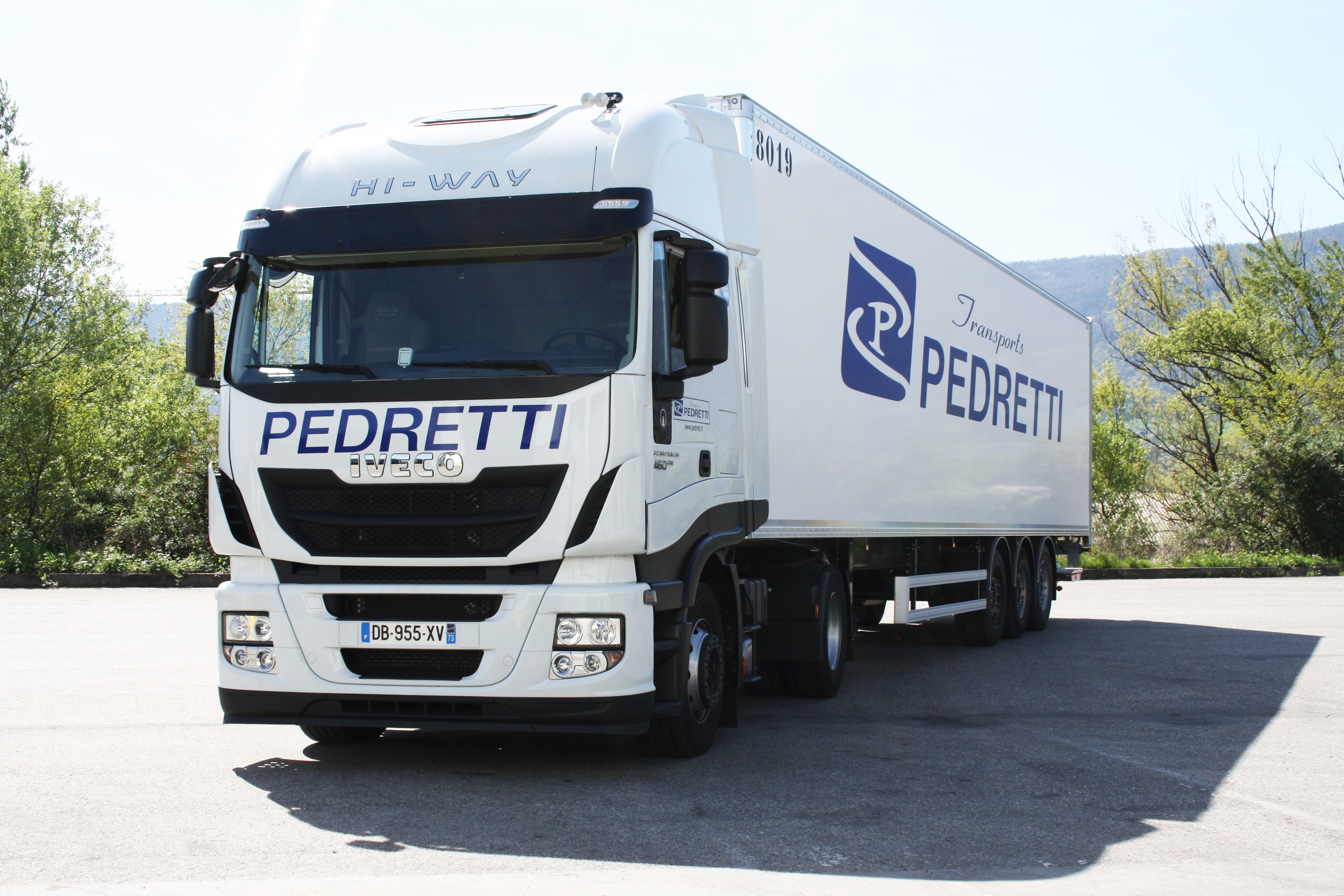

Overview
- Manufacturer: Iveco
- Production: 2002–2021
- Assembly: Spain: Madrid; South Korea: Gwangju; Australia: Dandenong; Argentina: Córdoba; Russia: Chelyabinsk

Body and chassis
- Class: Truck
- Body style: Active Day (urban) Active Time (regional) Active Space (long distance)

Powertrain
- Engine: Iveco Cursor
- Transmission: ZF; Allison

Chronology
- Predecessor: Iveco Eurostar and Iveco Eurotech
- Successor: Iveco S-Way

The Iveco Stralis is a heavy-duty truck produced by the Italian manufacturer Iveco between 2002 and 2021. The Stralis replaced the EuroStar and EuroTech models; it covers the range above the Eurocargo, between 19 and 44 tonnes. The fire version of the Stralis released with the German based Iveco Magirus.

In 2007, the Stralis received minor changes to cabin and front of the vehicle. All models have the EuroTronic gearbox, which have full or semi-automatic modes. The original Stralis, introduced in 2002, was the first heavy truck with an automated gearbox as standard equipment.

An updated version known as Stralis Hi-Range debuted in 2012, featuring Euro 6 engines, improved cabin ergonomics and facelifted design. It was available with three different cabs: Hi-Way (long haul sleeper), Hi-Road (sleeper) and Hi-Street (day cab).

All engines are four-valve straight-6 with modern pump nozzle injection.

Different performance levels from three different capacity variants are available:

- Cursor 8, 7.8 L capacity: 228-265 KW (310-360 PS)
- Cursor 10, 10.3 L capacity: 309-331 KW (420-450 PS)
- Cursor 13, 12.9 L capacity: 368-412 KW (500-560 PS)

All engines are equipped with a high performance decompression exhaust brake known as Iveco Turbobrake.

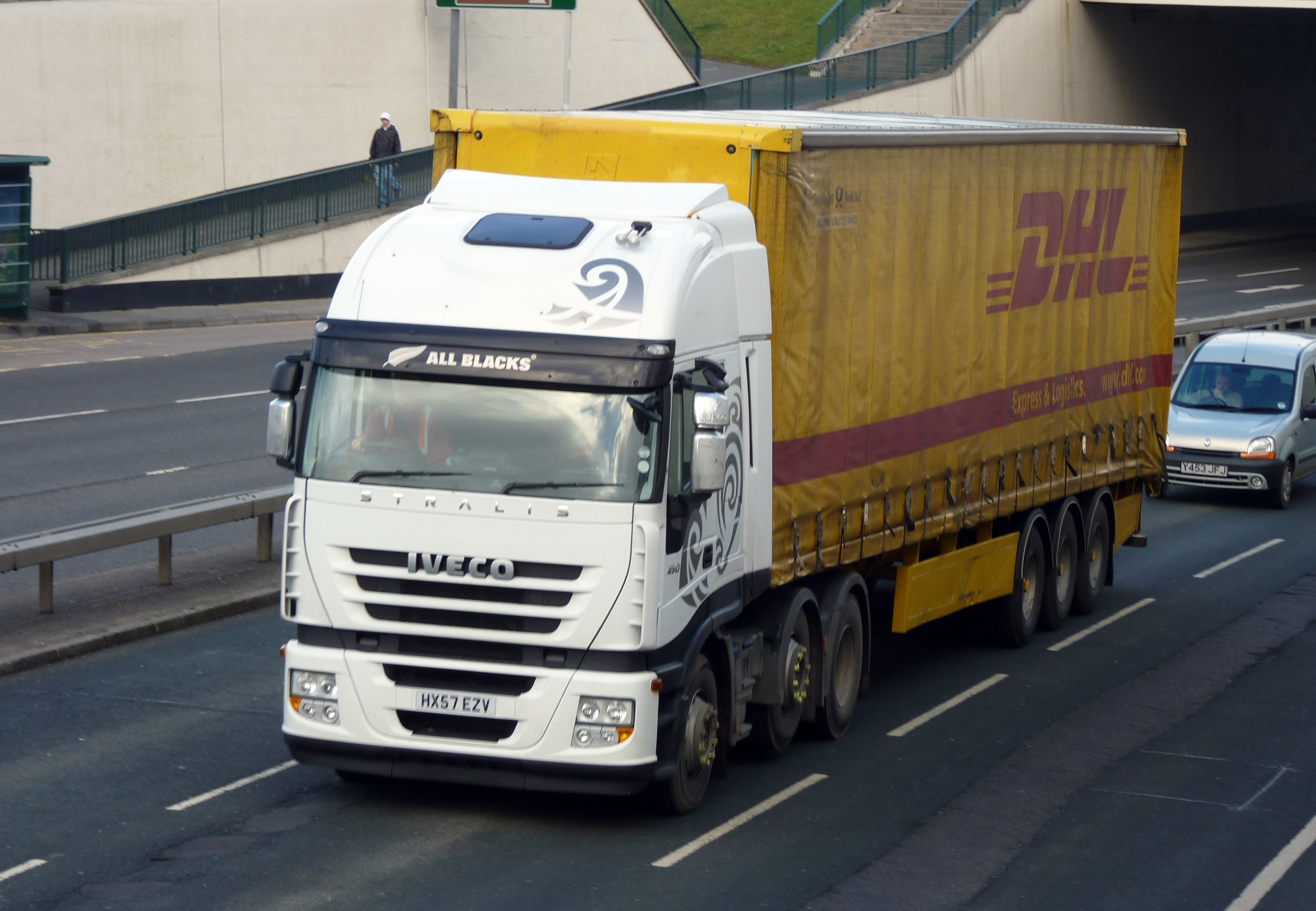
An Iveco Stralis lorry in the UK

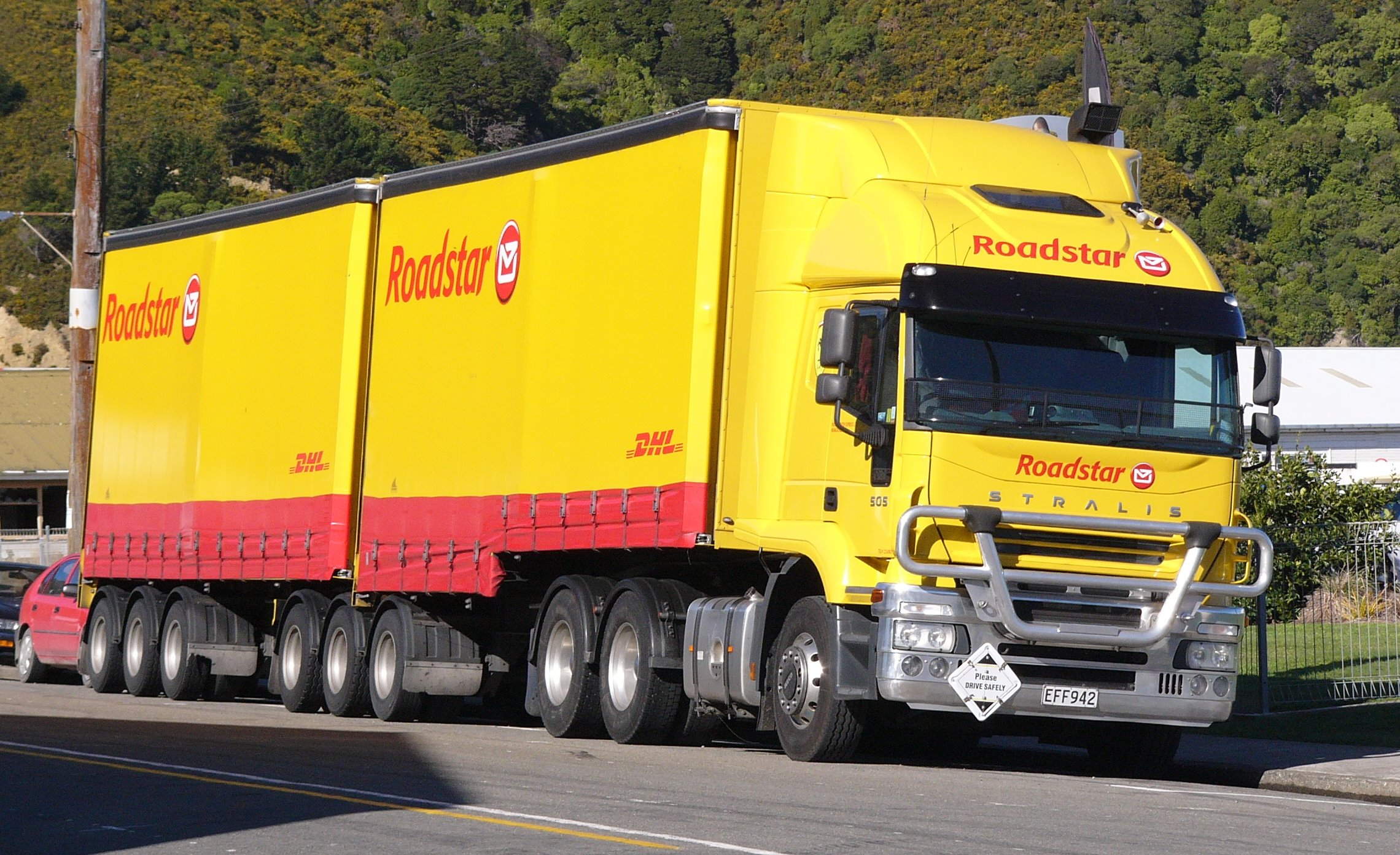
An Iveco Stralis lorry in New Zealand

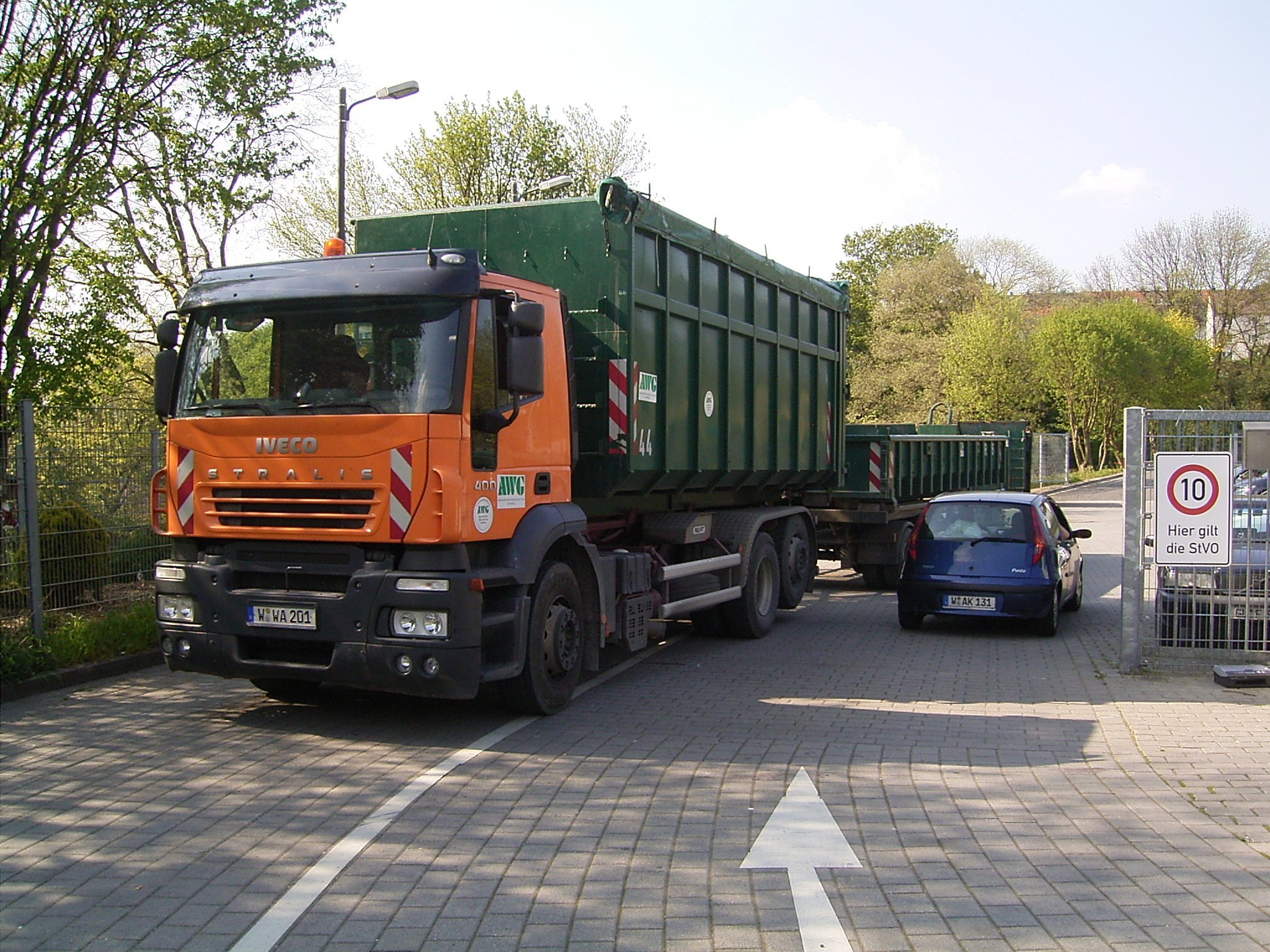
An Iveco Stralis recycling truck in Germany

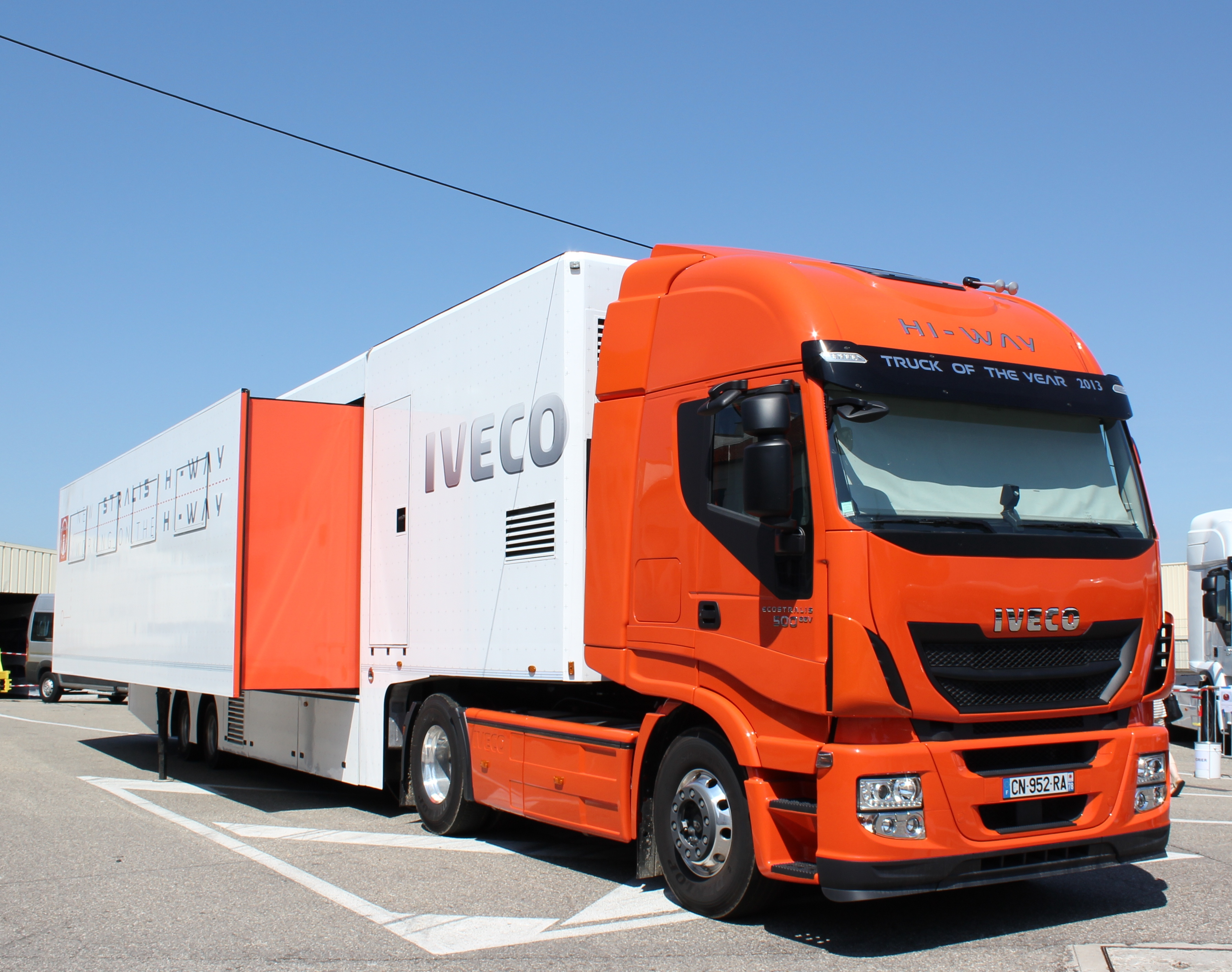
Iveco Stralis Hi-Way
