= Iveco S-Way =

Heavy-duty truck

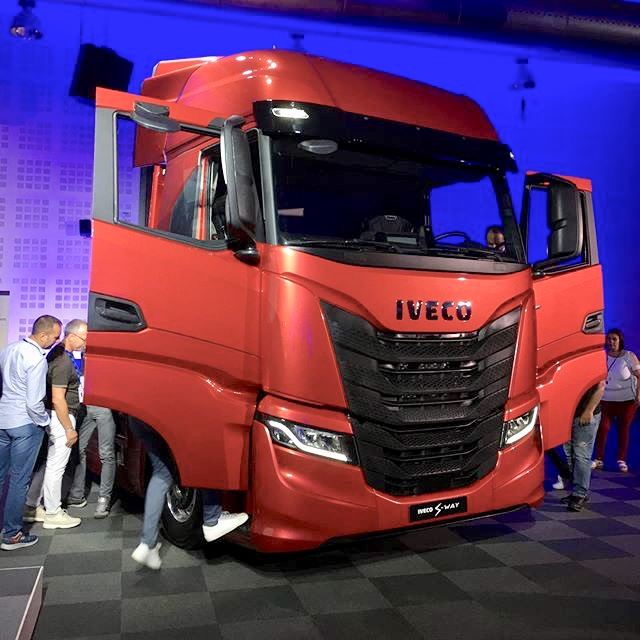

Overview
- Manufacturer: Iveco
- Also called: Nikola Tre
- Production: 2019–present
- Assembly: Spain: Madrid; Brazil: Sete Lagoas (Iveco Sete Lagoas)

Body and chassis
- Class: Large goods vehicle
- Body style: Cab over
- Related: Nikola Tre

Powertrain
- Engine: Diesel; 8.7 L Cursor 9 I6; 11.1 L Cursor 11 I6; 12.9 L Cursor 13 I6; Natural gas; 8.7 L Cursor 9 NP I6; 12.9 L Cursor 13 NP I6
- Transmission: 12 speed automatic (HI-TRONIX)

Dimensions
- Width: 2,300 mm (2.3 m); 2,500 mm (2.5 m)

Chronology
- Predecessor: Iveco Stralis

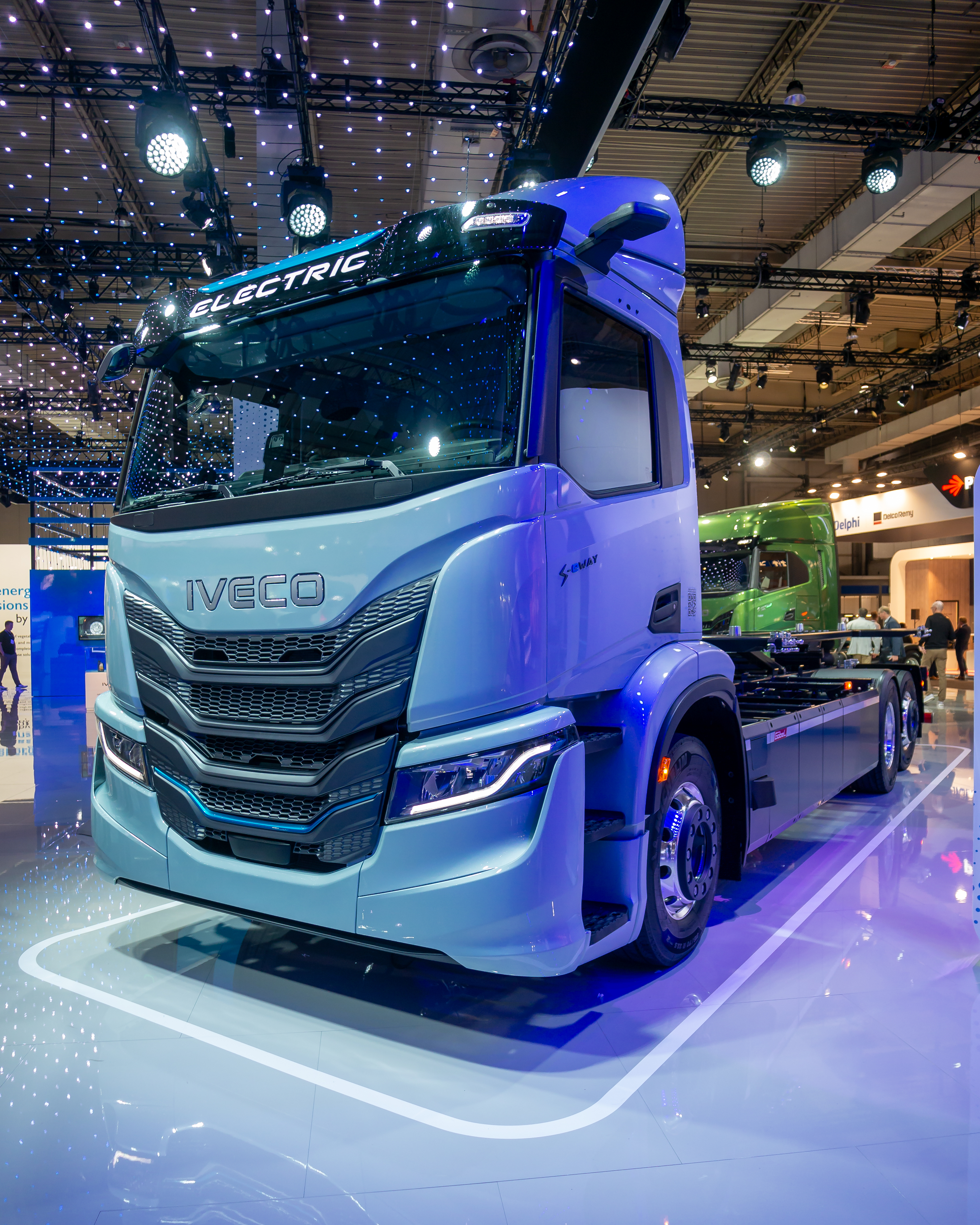
Iveco S-eWay at IAA Transportation 2024

The Iveco S-Way is a large goods vehicle manufactured by the Italian vehicle manufacturer Iveco. It was introduced in 2019 as a successor to the Iveco Stralis and is currently assembled in Madrid, Spain.

In November 2022, the S-Way was launched in South America, produced at the Iveco Sete Lagoas plant.

== Overview ==
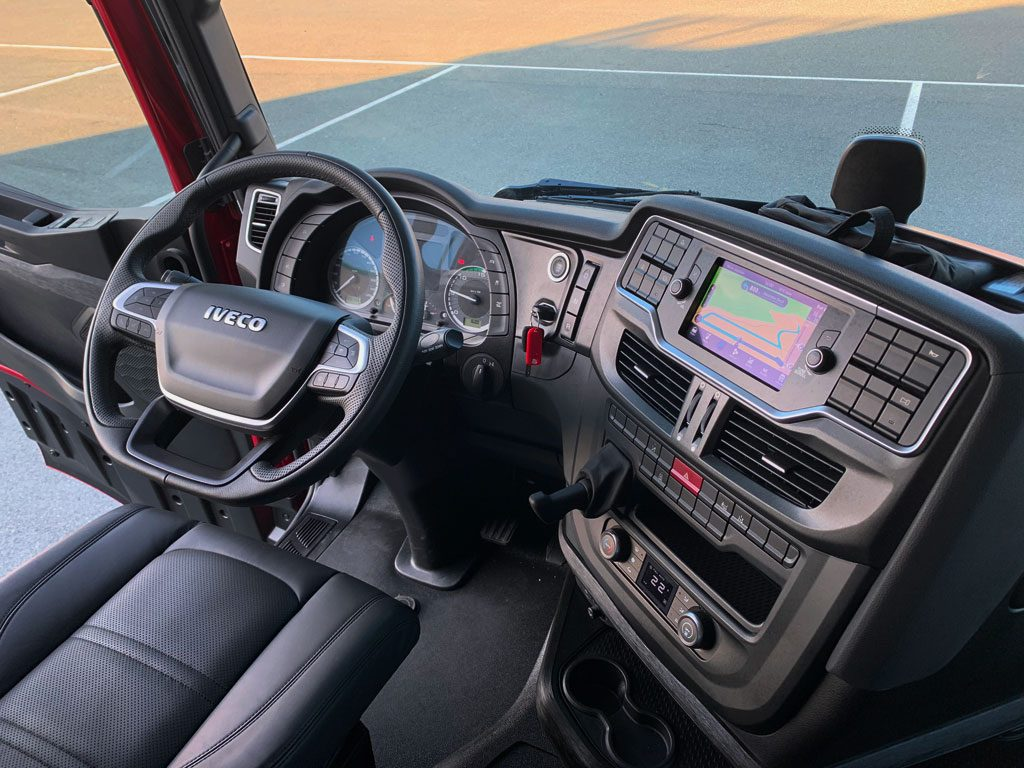
Interior

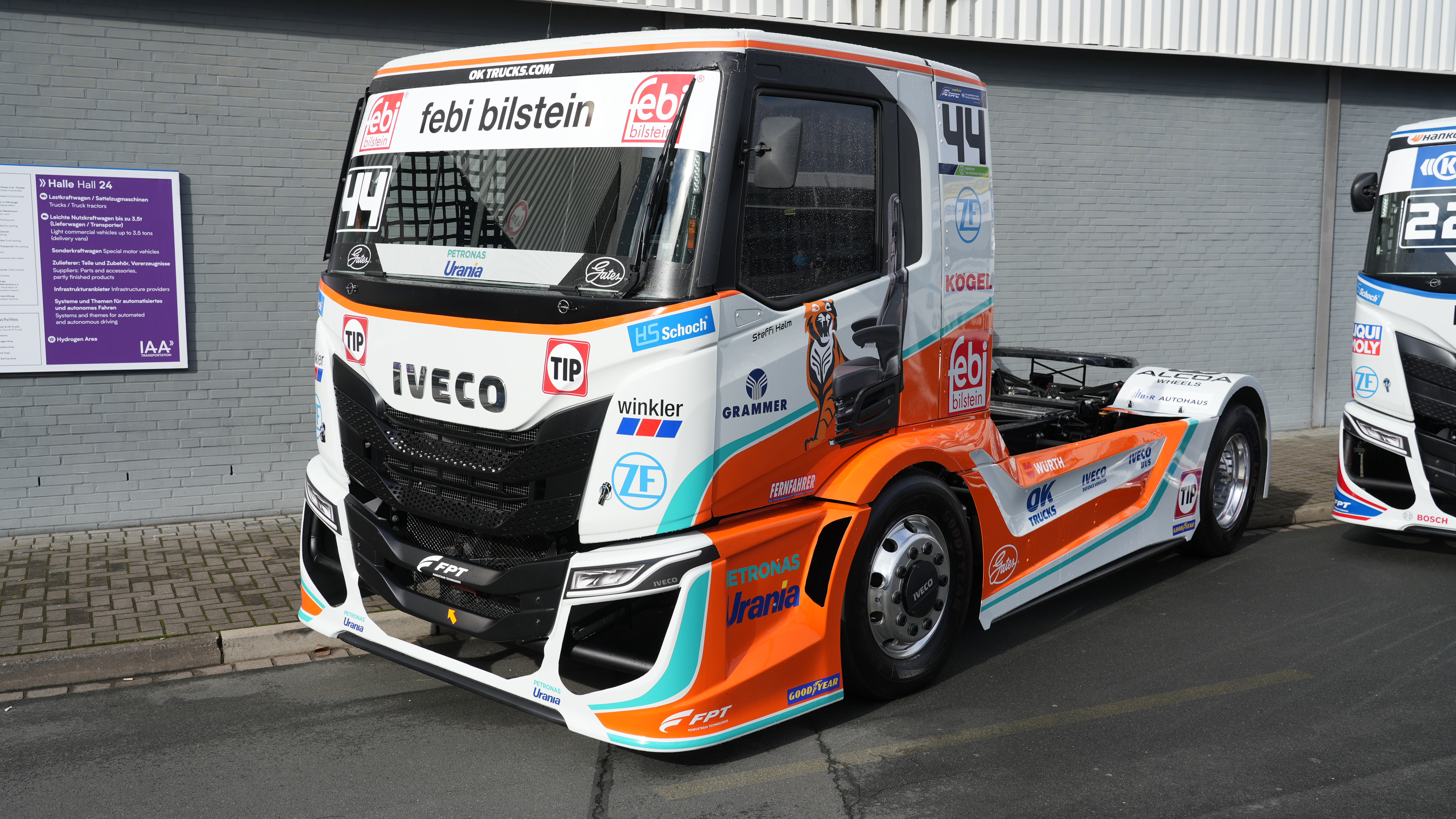
Iveco S-Way R Steffi Halm

The S-Way debuted on 2 July 2019 with a new cabin and digital technologies.

=== X-Way ===
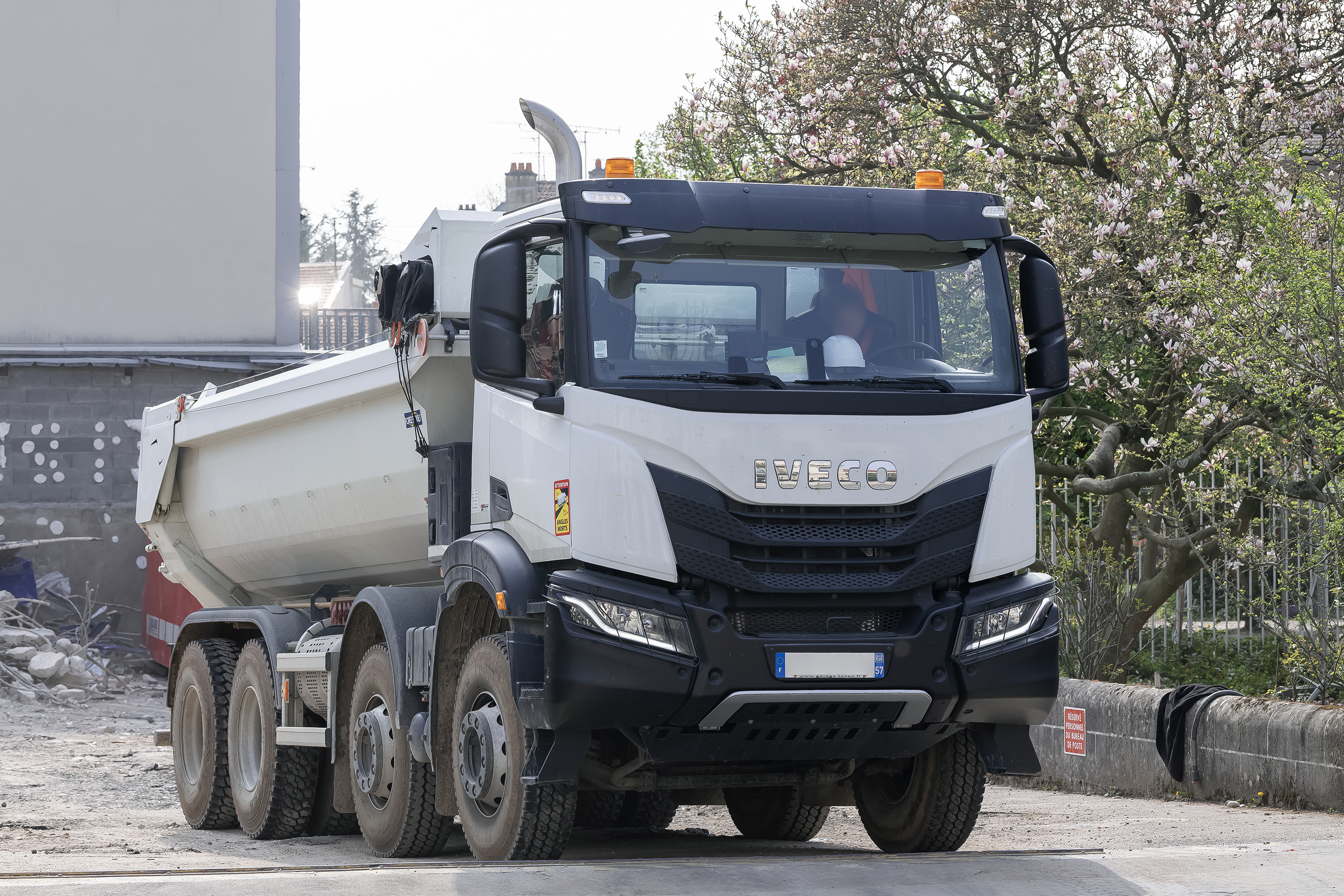
Iveco X-WAY 480

The Iveco X-Way is a light construction truck based on the S-Way. In the past, the X-Way was equipped with the Stralis cab, but from Q4 2020, the S-Way cab is used instead.

=== Nikola Tre / S-eWay ===
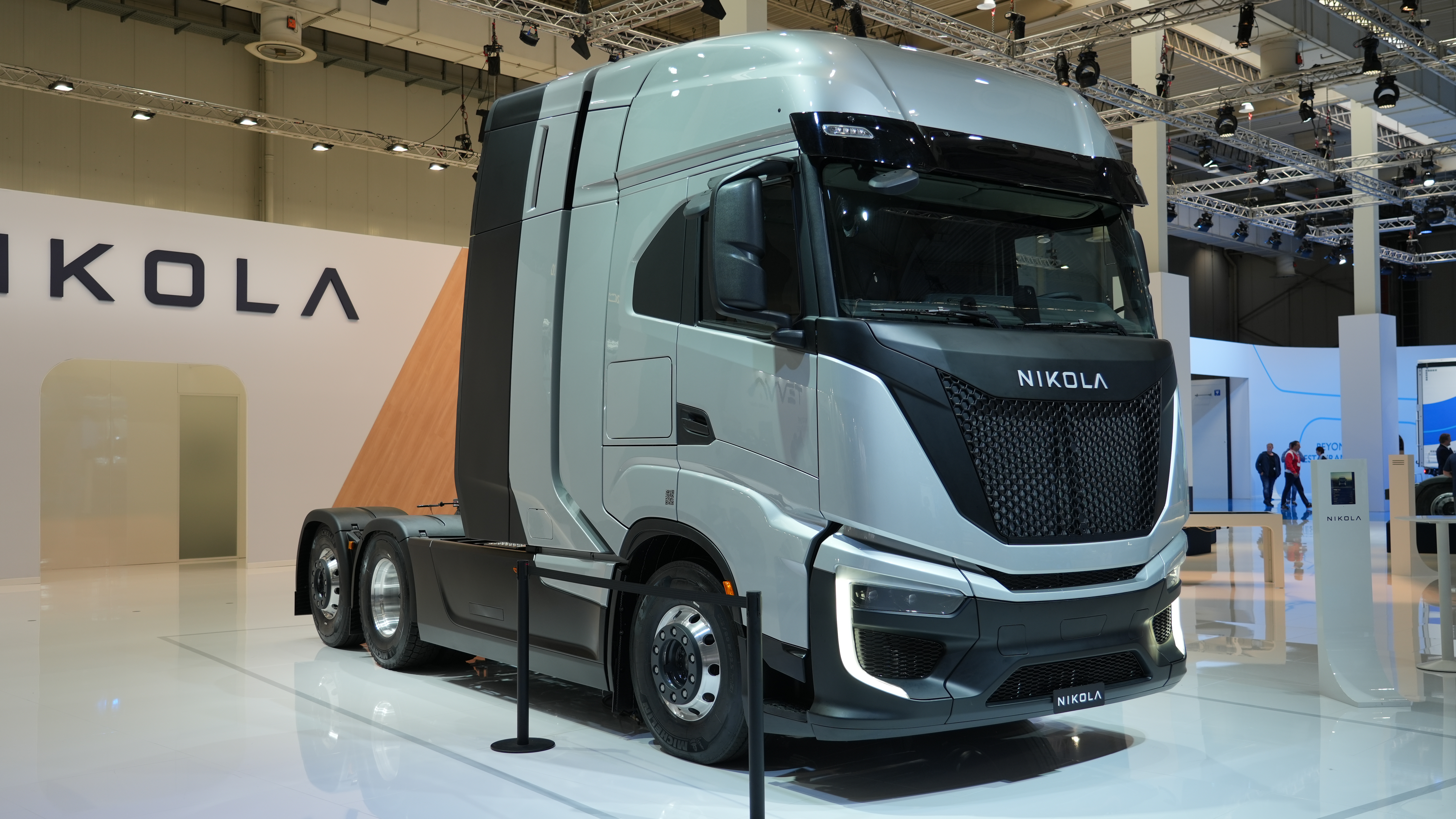
Nikola Tre FCEV

In November 2019, Nikola Motor Company and Iveco presented the jointly developed Nikola Tre electric truck, with a power of 644 hp (480 kW), a maximum torque of 1,800 N⋅m (1,300 lbf⋅ft), a battery of 720 kWh and a range of up to 400 km (250 mi). It is developed on the basis of the Iveco S-Way.

On 21 September 2022, at the IAA Transportation 2022 exhibition in Hanover, the production version of the Nikola Tre BEV 4x2 was presented, with a range of up to 530 km (330 mi) without recharging.

A hydrogen fuel cell prototype, the Nikola Tre FCEV 6×2, which has an autonomy of up to 800 km (500 mi), was also presented at the exhibition.

In the European market, the truck is known as IVECO S-eWay.

== Engines ==
All engines use SCR-Systems and meet Euro 6d.

| Engine | Displacement (l) | Power (kW) at n (R/min) | Torque (Nm) at (R/min) |
Diesel
| Cursor 9 | 8.7 | 243 at 1655–2200 | 1400 at 1100–1655 |
| Cursor 9 | 8.7 | 265 at 1530–2200 | 1650 at 1200–1530 |
| Cursor 9 | 8.7 | 294 at 1655–2200 | 1700 at 1200–1655 |
| Cursor 11 | 11.1 | 309 at 1475–1900 | 2000 at 870–1475 |
| Cursor 11 | 11.1 | 338 at 1500–1900 | 2150 at 925–1500 |
| Cursor 11 | 11.1 | 353 at 1465–1900 | 2300 at 970–1465 |
| Cursor 13 | 12.9 | 375 at 1560–1900 | 2300 at 900–1560 |
| Cursor 13 | 12.9 | 420 at 1605—1900 | 2500 at 1000–1605 |
Natural gas (methane)
| Cursor 9 NP | 8.7 | 250 at 2000 | 1500 at 1100–1600 |
| Cursor 9 NP | 8.7 | 294 at 2000 | 1700 at 1200–1575 |
| Cursor 13 NP | 12.9 | 338 at 1900 | 2000 at 1100–1600 |

== Safety ==
Euro NCAP test results Iveco S-Way 4x2 Tractor Unit (2024)
| Test | Score |
|---|---|
| Overall: | 1 /5 stars |
| Safe driving | 32% |
| Crash avoidance | 19% |
| Post crash | 80% |

Euro NCAP test results Iveco S-Way 4x2 Tractor Unit (2024)
| Test | Score |
|---|---|
| Overall: | 3 /5 stars |
| Safe driving | 85% |
| Crash avoidance | 35% |
| Post crash | 80% |

Euro NCAP test results Iveco S-Way 4x2 Tractor Unit (2026)
| Test | Score |
|---|---|
| Overall: | 2 /5 stars |
| Safe driving | 68% |
| Crash avoidance | 20% |
| Post crash | 80% |

Euro NCAP test results Iveco S-Way 6x2 Rigid (2026)
| Test | Score |
|---|---|
| Overall: | 2 /5 stars |
| Safe driving | 68% |
| Crash avoidance | 20% |
| Post crash | 80% |

Euro NCAP test results Iveco S-Way 4x2 Rigid (2026)
| Test | Score |
|---|---|
| Overall: | 2 /5 stars |
| Safe driving | 67% |
| Crash avoidance | 20% |
| Post crash | 80% |

== Gallery ==
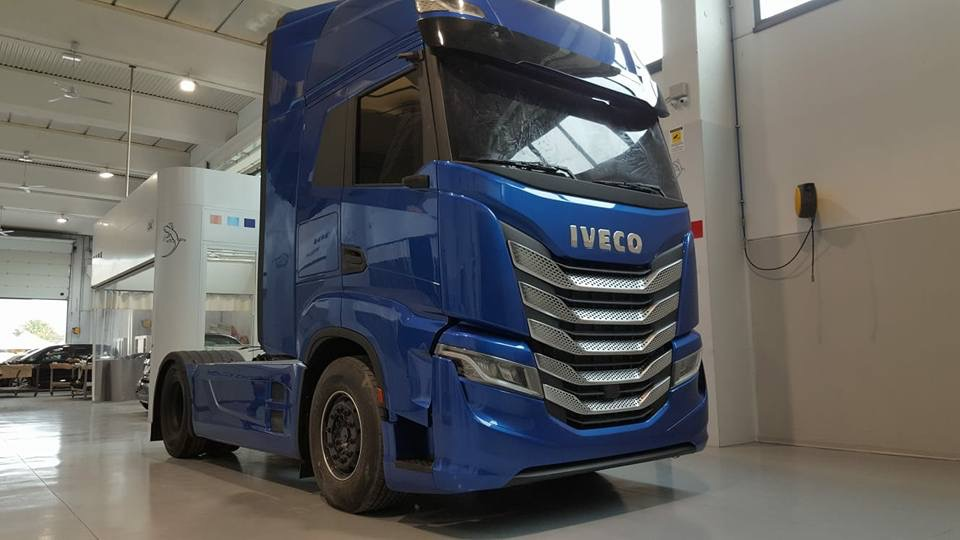
2019 Iveco S-Way Prototype

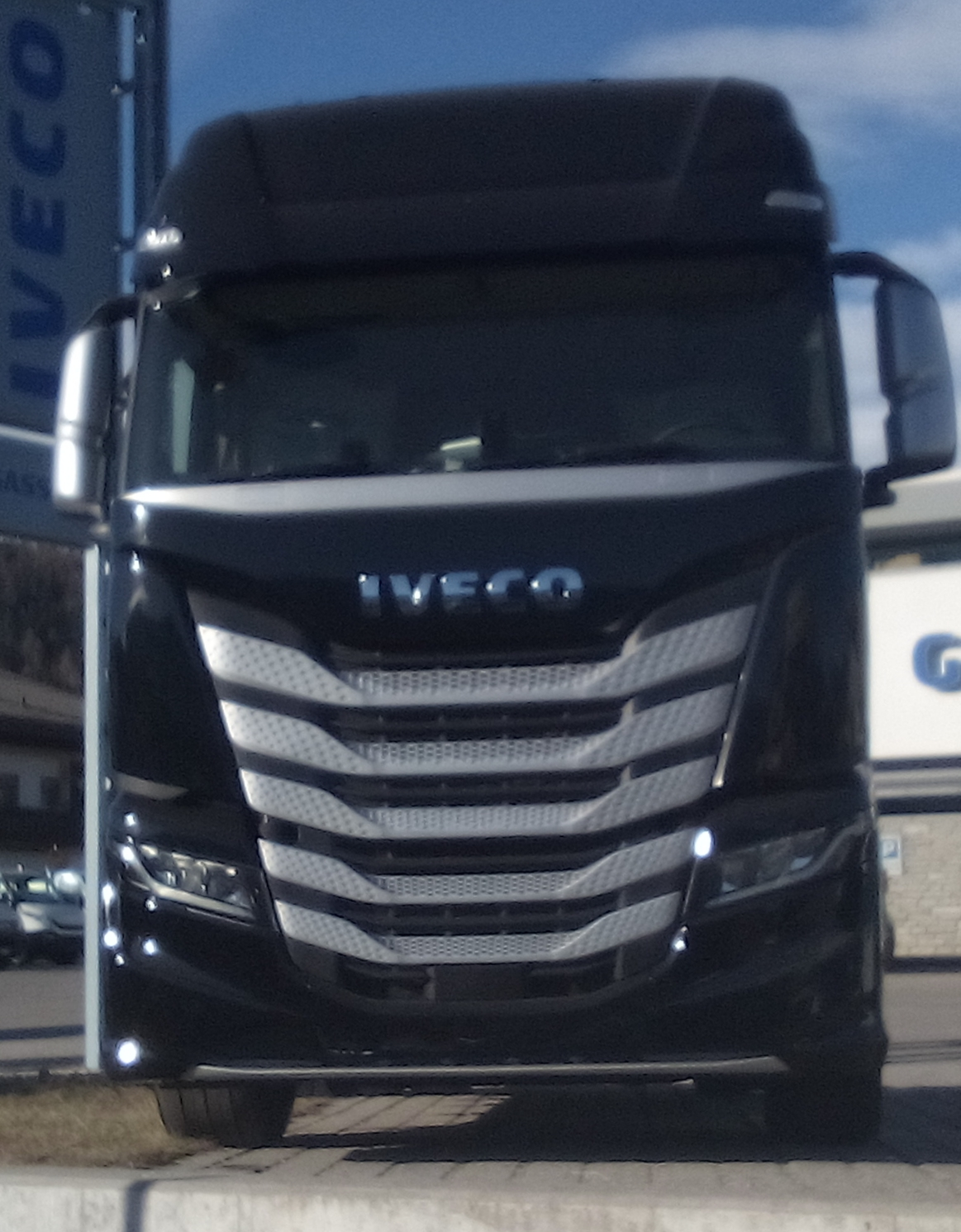
2020 Iveco S-Way

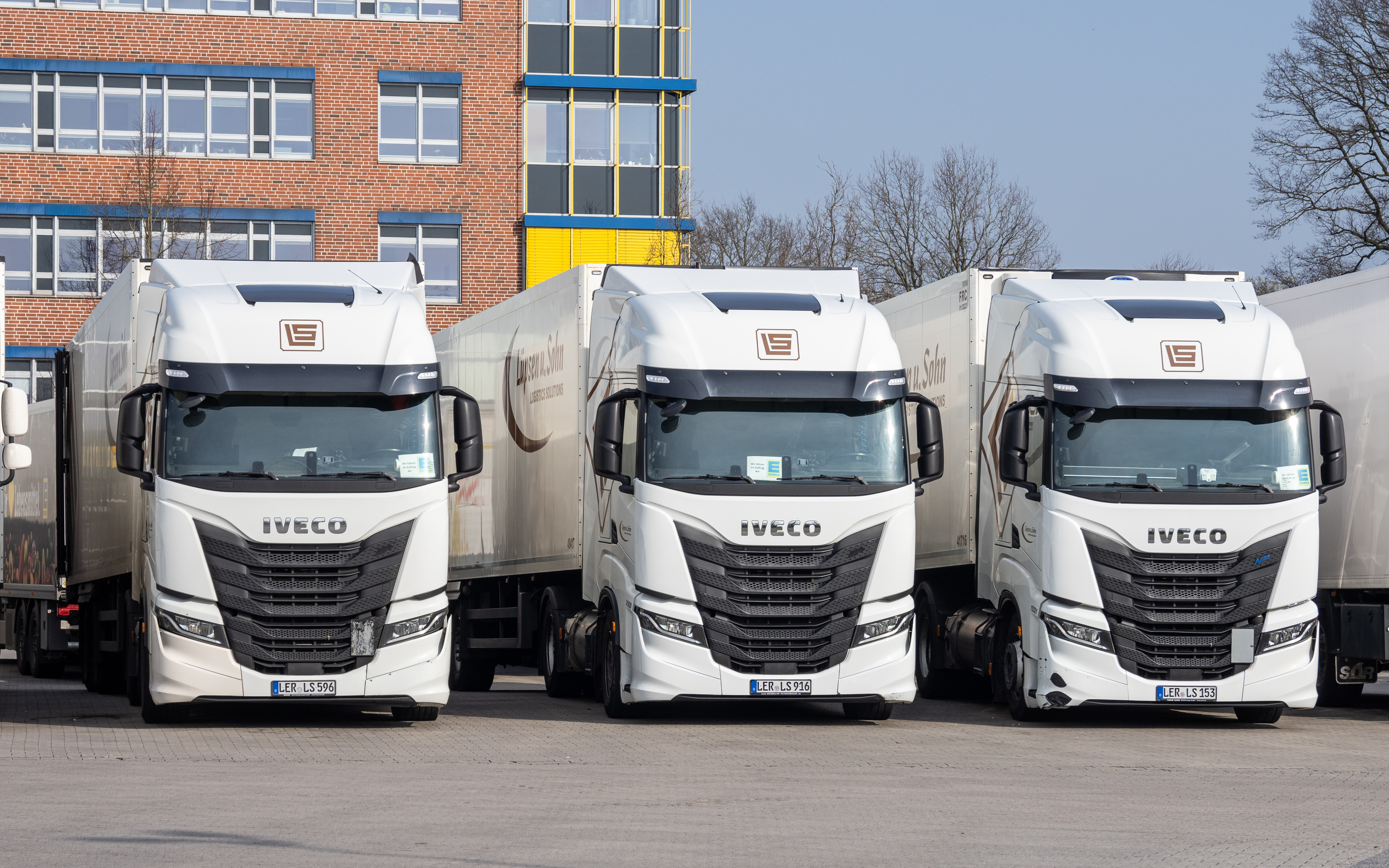
IVECO S-Way NP trucks
