= Iveco EuroStar =

Iveco Eurostar
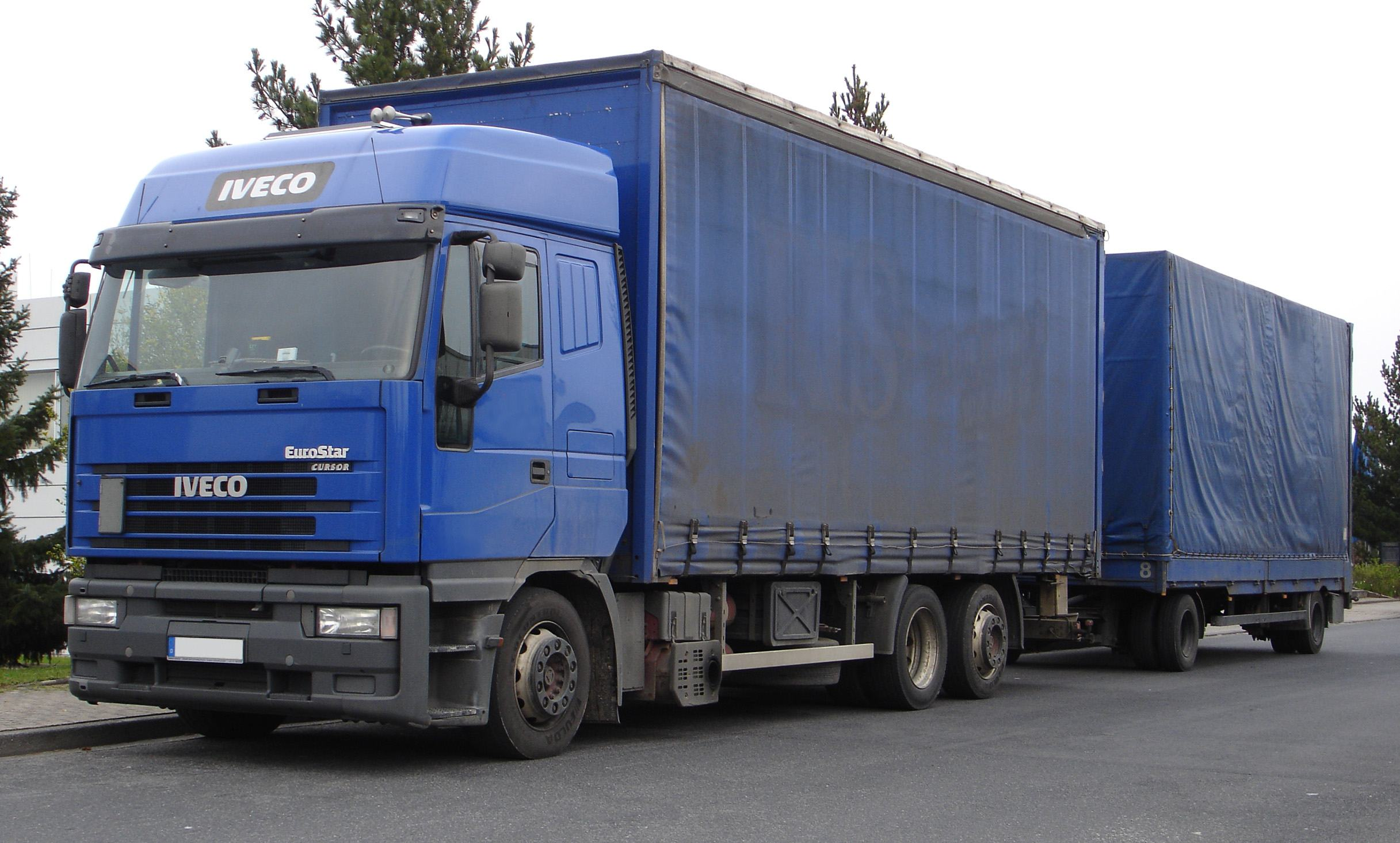

Overview
- Manufacturer: Iveco
- Production: 1993–2002

Body and chassis
- Class: Truck

Chronology
- Predecessor: Iveco Turbostar
- Successor: Iveco Stralis

The Iveco EuroStar was a heavy-duty truck model that was produced as the flagship by Iveco from 1993 until 2003, when it got replaced by the Stralis. It replaced the 1980s-designed Turbostar.

== Variants ==
=== Cab layout ===
During its initial launch in 1993, multiple variations on the design were available:

Roofs were able to be specified in three variations: Flat, high, or extra-high roofed, making Iveco one of the first manufacturers to offer more than one high-roof variation.

Both sleeper and day cabs were available on order, however the day cab was far less popular.

=== Engines ===
Multiple engine options were also available initially:

- 6-cylinder 9.5L engine, the 8460.41L, rated at 375 HP & 1700Nm of torque- Also available on the smaller Eurotech model
- 6-cylinder 13.8L engine, the 8210.42L, rated at 420HP & 1900Nm- Note, according to contemporary user questioned by author this was the most popular variant. As with the other 6-cylinder, also available on the Eurotech
- V8 17.2L engine, the 8280.42S, rated at 514 hp & 2200Nm- Only available on the Eurostar.

All three engines met Euro 1 standard on release.

Later on, in order to fill the large power gap between the mid-range 6-cylinder model and the flagship V8, a third 6-cylinder was added: The 8210.42M variant of the 13.8L 6-cylinder previously mentioned, rated at 469HP

In 1999, to comply with the newly introduced Euro 2 legislation, previous engine models were replaced with the emissions compliant Cursor engine family, which replaced the previous four options with 4 engine ratings from two different engines:

- 6-cylinder 10.3L engine, the Cursor 10, rated at 400 or 430HP
- 6-cylinder 12.9L engine, the Cursor 13, rated at 460 or 480HP

Due to limited sales with the previously available V8, no new V8 was introduced with the Cursor range.

=== Gearboxes ===
At release, only one gearbox was available: the ZF 16-speed Ecosplit. In 1997, the Eurotronic automated gearbox was introduced as an option, acting as a part-time automatic gearbox depending on situation.

== Note ==
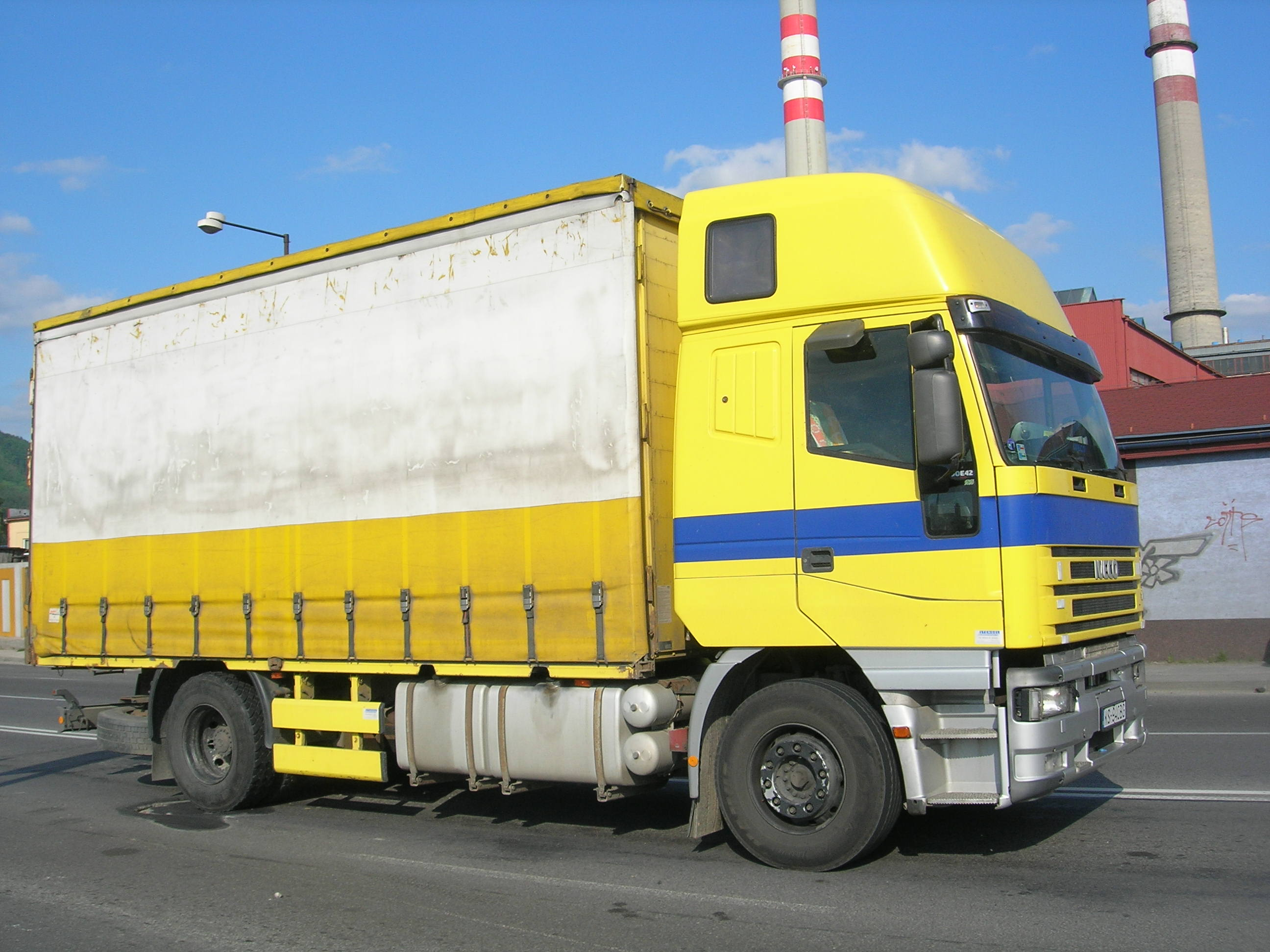
An Iveco EuroStar

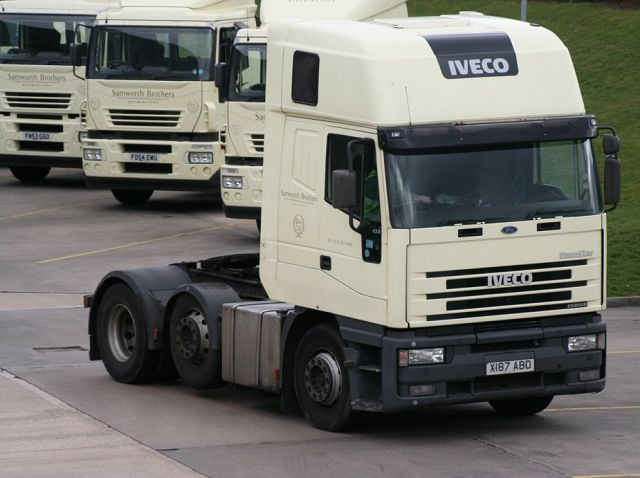
An Iveco-EuroStar cab

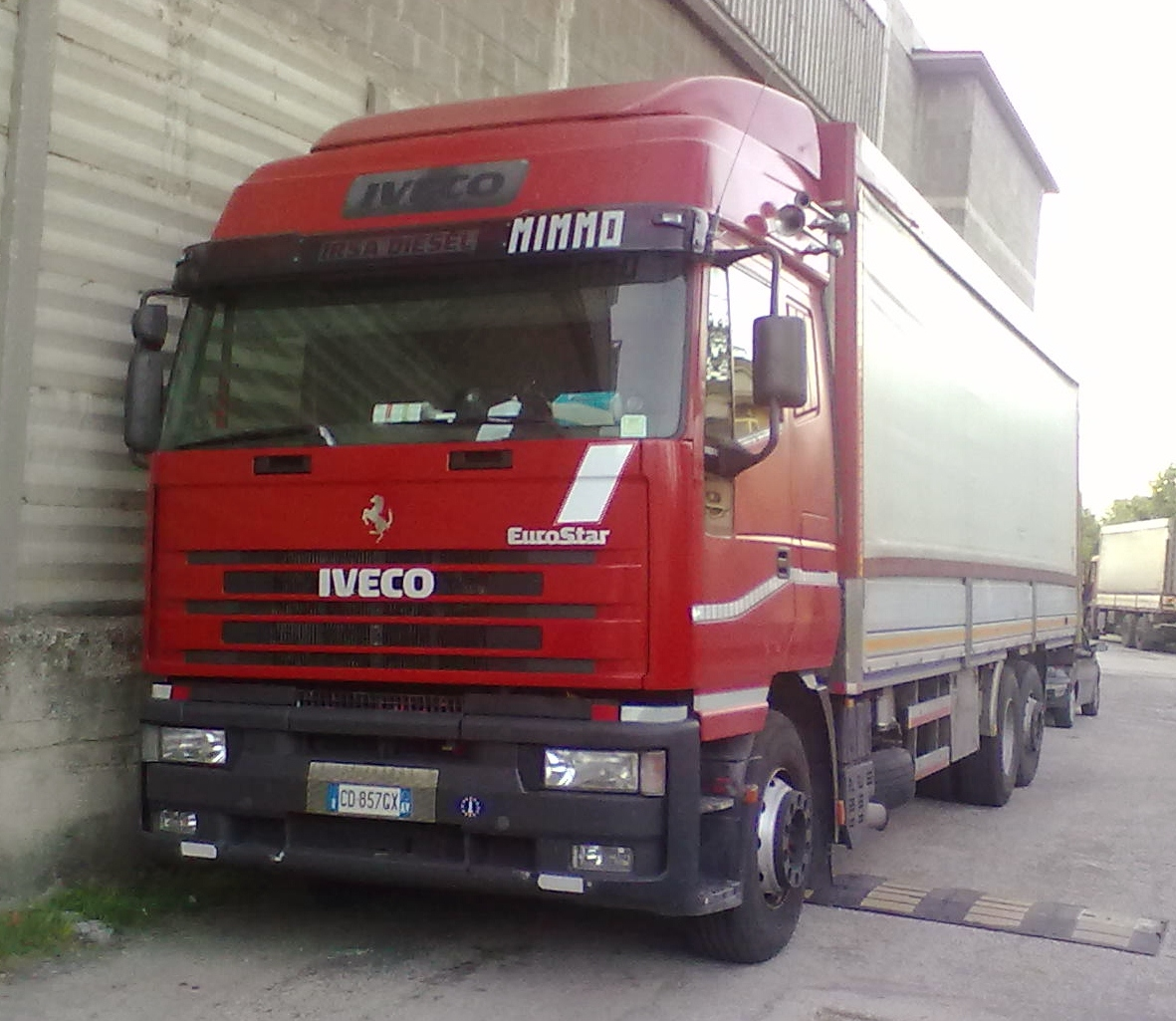
An Iveco EuroStar
