= Lancia Veicoli Speciali =

Italian commercial vehicle maker

Lancia Veicoli Speciali was an Italian commercial vehicle maker with origins in Lancia. It was merged into Iveco in 1975. Lancia remained the property of the founding family until 1955, when it was taken over by Carlo Pesenti who later, in 1969, sold it to FIAT. In 1970 the Lancia Industrial Vehicles division became Lancia Veicoli Speciali, offering complementary models to the Fiat V.I. until the establishment of IVECO.
