= Olof Persson (businessman) =

Swedish corporate executive (born 1964)

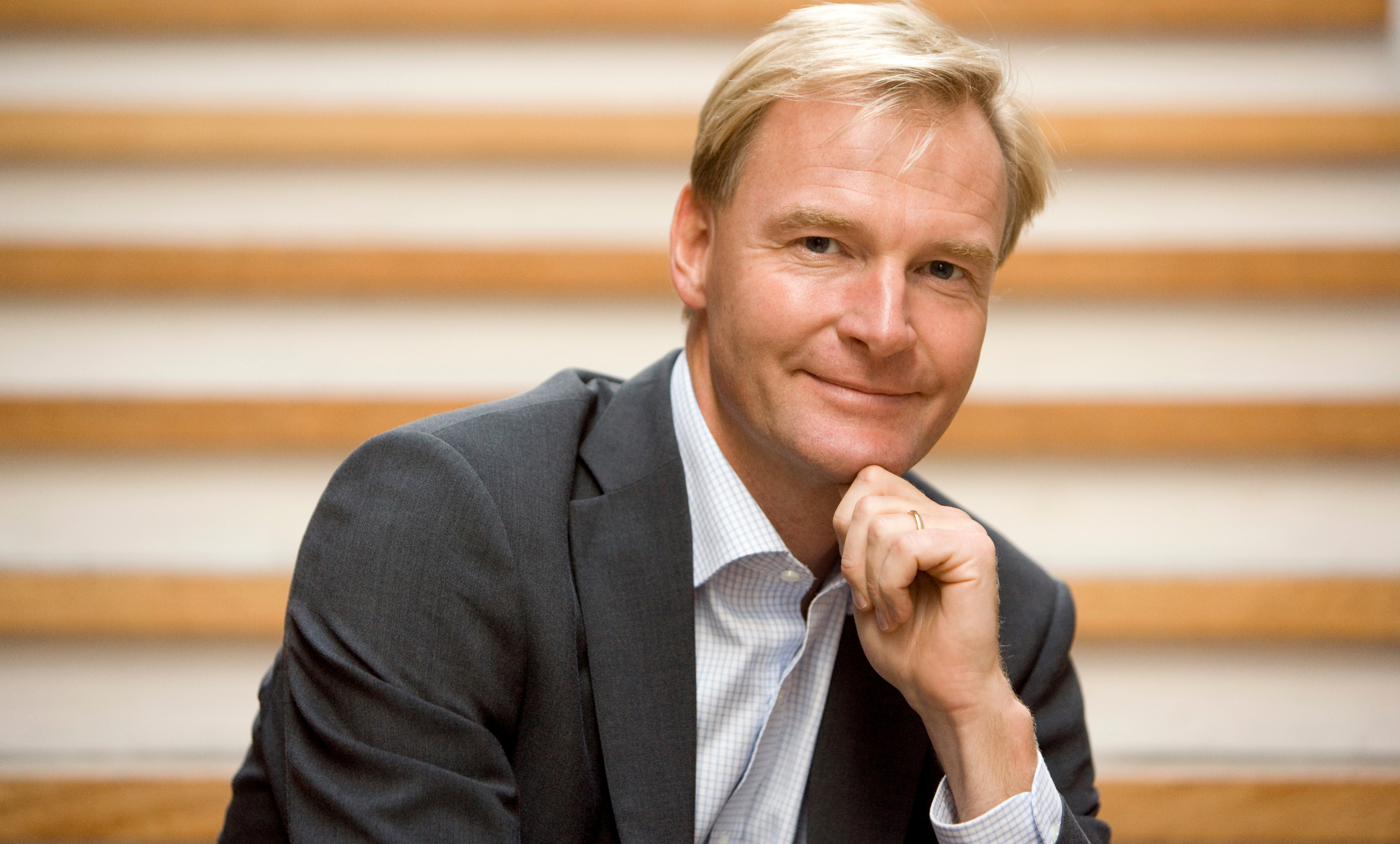
- Born: Olof Persson; June 22, 1964 (age 62); Sweden
- Education: Bachelor of Science, Economics, Karlstad University
- Occupations: CEO Iveco Group (2024-present) former CEO - Volvo Group (2011-2015); CEO - Volvo Construction Equipment (2008-2011); CEO - Volvo Aero (2006-2008)

Olof Erland Persson (born June 22, 1964) is a Swedish manager. He was the president of Volvo and CEO of the Volvo Group until April 22, 2015, having been in the role since September 1, 2011. He was also a member of the Volvo Group and executive team since 2006. In 2022 he joined the board of Iveco Group before assuming the role of CEO on July 1, 2024. In addition to these duties, he is also the chairman of the board of the German-Swedish Chamber of Commerce.

== Education ==
Born and raised in Sweden, Persson went on to study at Karlstad University where he graduated with a Bachelor of Science in business administration and economics.

== Career ==
Olof Persson began his career at ABB in 1988 and, among other assignments, held a number of executive positions at Adtranz and Daimler-Chrysler.

In 2004, he was appointed the president of the mainline and metros division of Bombardier, where he remained until 2006, when he was offered the job as president and CEO of Volvo Aero. In 2008, Persson was made the president and CEO of Volvo Construction Equipment in Brussels, until his appointment as president of the entire group in 2011 until April 22, 2015, when he was replaced by Martin Lundstedt.
