= Chevrolet Cruze =

Compact car (2008–2023)

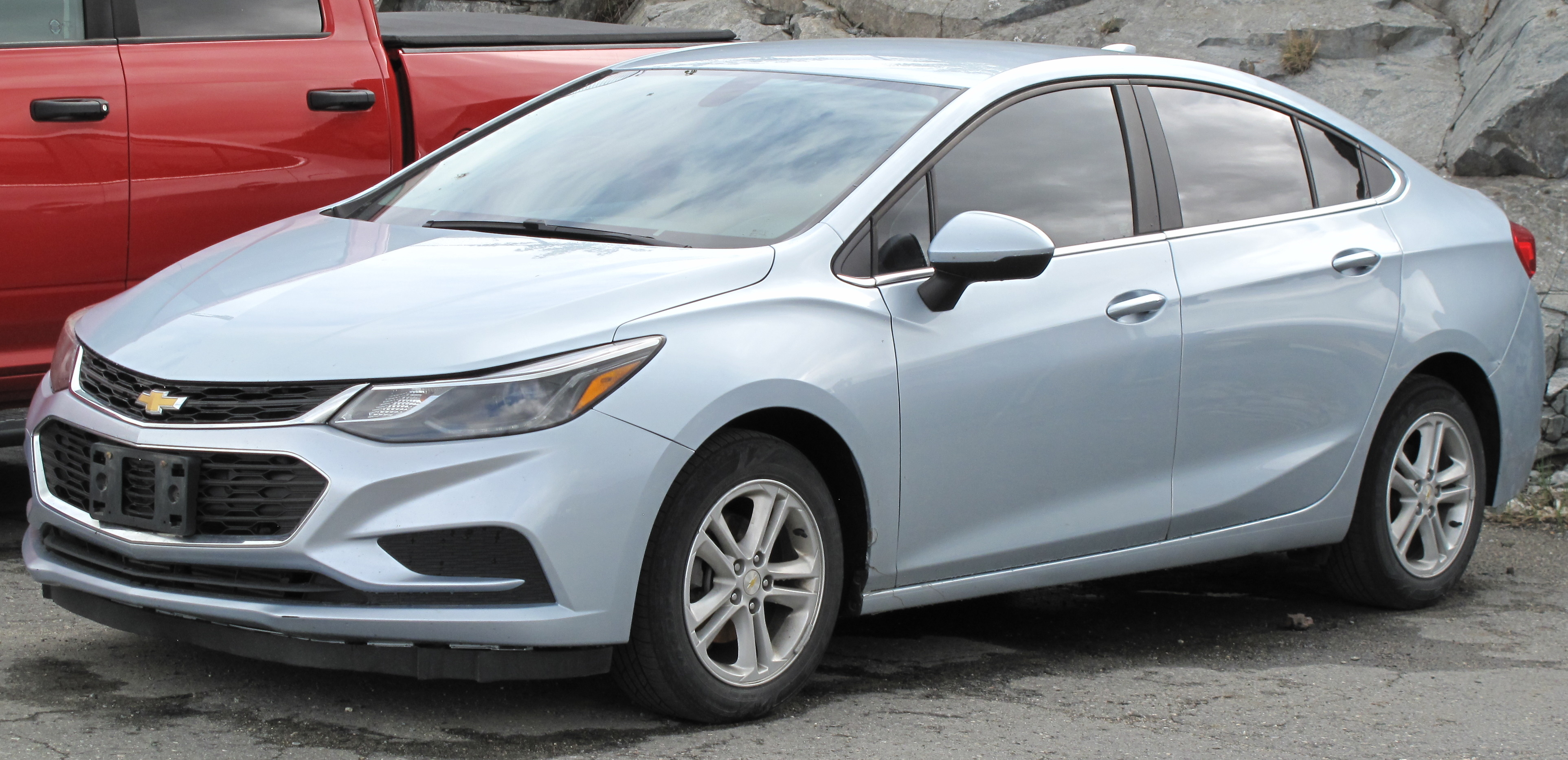
- 2017 Chevrolet Cruze LT sedan

Overview
- Manufacturer: General Motors
- Also called: Daewoo Lacetti Premiere (2008–2011); Holden Cruze (2009–2016); Holden Astra Sedan (2016–2019)
- Production: 2008–2023
- Model years: 2011–2019 (North America)

Body and chassis
- Class: Compact car (C)
- Layout: Front-engine, front-wheel drive

Chronology
- Predecessor: Daewoo/Chevrolet Lacetti/Chevrolet Optra; Chevrolet Cobalt/Pontiac G5 (North America); Saturn Astra (North America, hatchback); Chevrolet Vectra (South America); Chevrolet Astra (South America); Holden Astra (Australasia, hatchback); Holden Viva (Australasia, sedan and station wagon)
- Successor: Holden Astra (Australasia); Chevrolet Monza/Cavalier (China and Mexico)

The Chevrolet Cruze (Korean: 쉐보레 크루즈) is a compact car produced by General Motors from 2008 through 2023. It was designated as a globally developed, designed, and manufactured four-door compact sedan, complemented by a five-door hatchback body variant from 2011, and a station wagon in 2012. The Cruze replaced several compact models, including the Chevrolet Optra which was sold internationally under various names, the Chevrolet Cobalt sold exclusively in North America, and the Australasian-market Holden Astra.

The Cruze was released in 2008 for the South Korean market as the Daewoo Lacetti Premiere (Korean: 대우 라세티 프리미어) prior to the adoption of its international name in 2011, when the Daewoo brand was discontinued. In Australasia, the model was sold between 2009 and 2016 as the Holden Cruze. In 2016, the Cruze sedan was restyled and renamed for the Australasian market as the Holden Astra Sedan, as a sedan complement to the Holden Astra family.

Due to the market shift towards SUVs and decreasing sales, the Cruze has been gradually phased out. Production of the Cruze in South Korea ended in 2018 as part of restructuring of GM Korea, which in turn ceased supply of the Holden Astra Sedan to Australasia. In the United States and Mexico, production ended in 2019, while production in China ended in 2020. Production continued in Argentina until 2023. It was replaced by the Monza in China, which is known as the Cavalier in Mexico.

== Nameplate disambiguation ==
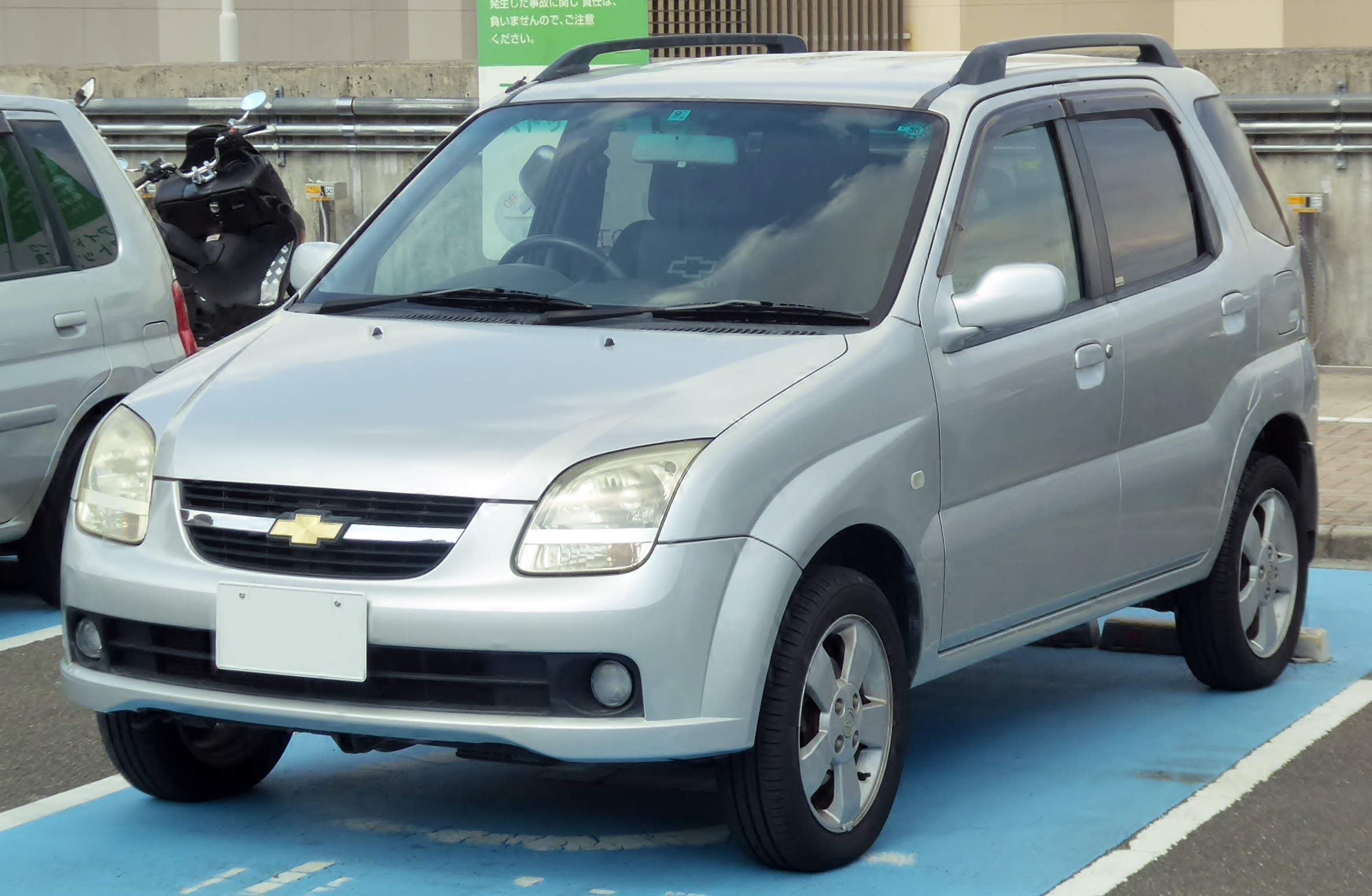

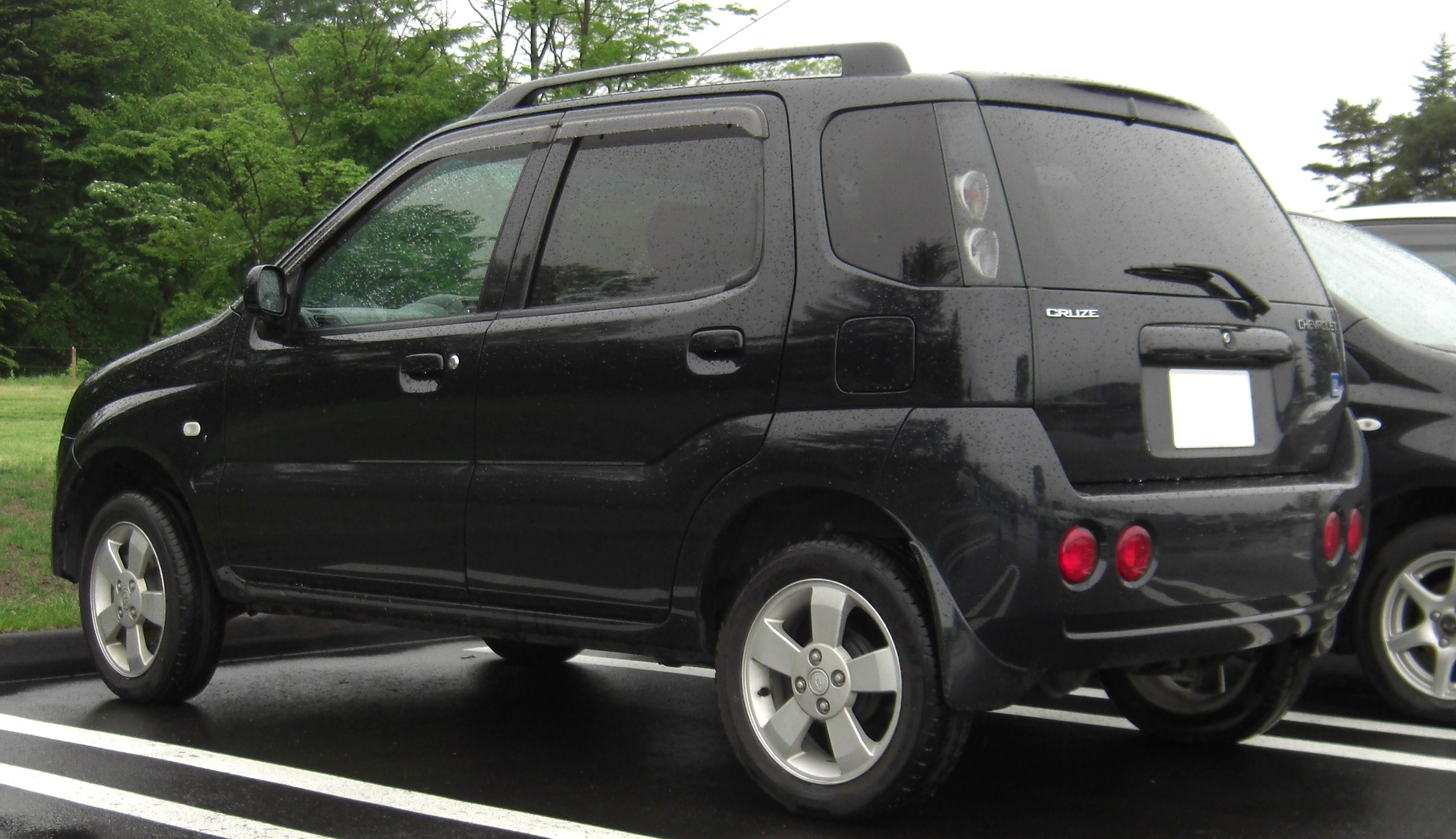
2001–2008 Chevrolet Cruze

Before the release of the global Chevrolet Cruze compact sedan in 2008, General Motors made use of the name "Cruze" between 2001 and 2008 in Japan, Australia (as Holden Cruze), and New Zealand. Announced as the Chevrolet YGM1 concept car at the Tokyo Motor Show in 1999, the original Cruze was derived from the subcompact Suzuki Ignis five-door hatchback (known as the Suzuki Swift in Japan). Despite the Chevrolet branding, the YGM1, like the production car, was the work of GM's Australian arm, Holden. Along with the styling, Holden executed most of the engineering work and were responsible for devising the "Cruze" nameplate. The Cruze came either with a 1.3- or 1.5-liter engine coupled to either five-speed manual or four-speed automatic transmissions.

Manufactured by Suzuki in Japan, GM revealed the production Chevrolet Cruze in October 2001, with Japanese sales commencing the following month. From 2002 through to 2006 this generation of Cruze was sold in Australia (as Holden) and New Zealand (as Chevrolet).

The production Cruze had standard front-wheel drive, with all-wheel drive optional. Chevrolet pursued a marketing strategy that positioned the high-riding Cruze as a light-duty sport utility vehicle (SUV). This contrasted with Suzuki's approach with the Ignis marketed as a conventional passenger model. From 2003, Suzuki of Europe began manufacturing the Cruze as the Suzuki Ignis—representing a facelift of the original Ignis, but only for European markets.

== First generation (J300; 2008) ==
First generation
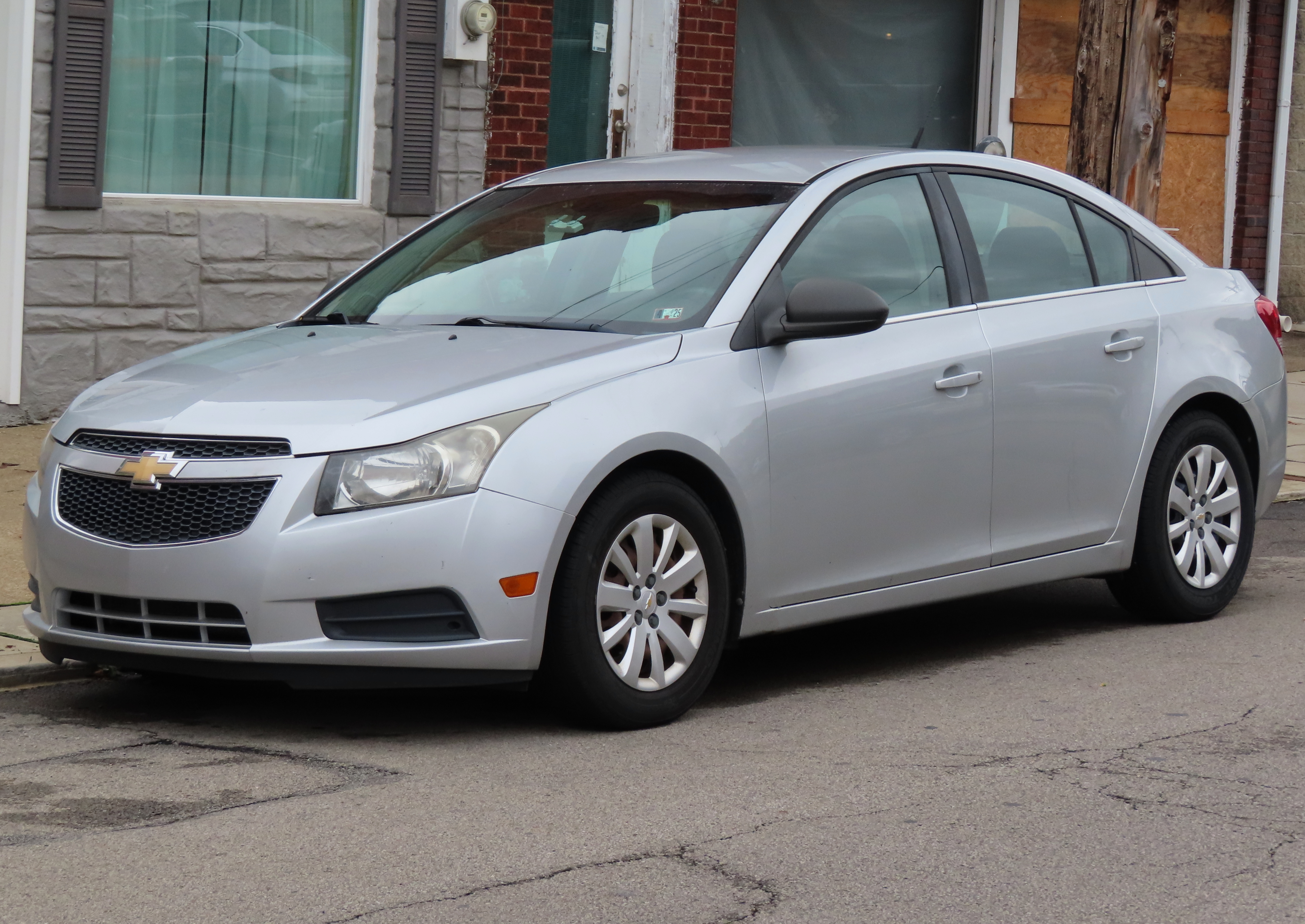
- Cruze LS sedan (pre-facelift)

Overview
- Model code: J300
- Also called: Daewoo Lacetti Premiere (South Korea, 2008–2011); Holden Cruze (Australasia)
- Production: 2008–2016
- Model years: 2011–2015 (North America); 2016 (Cruze Limited)
- Assembly: Australia: Adelaide, South Australia (Elizabeth; 2011–2016); Brazil: São Caetano do Sul, São Paulo (GM Brazil); China: Shenyang, Liaoning (Shanghai GM); Colombia: Bogotá (GM Colmotores, 2011–2015); India: Halol, Gujarat (GM India; 2009–2017); Kazakhstan: Ust-Kamenogorsk; Russia: Saint Petersburg; South Korea: Gunsan, Jeonbuk (GM Korea; 2008–2016); Thailand: Rayong (GM Thailand; 2009–2017); United States: Lordstown, Ohio (Lordstown Assembly; 2011–2016); Vietnam: Hanoi (GM Vietnam; 2010–2016)
- Designer: Dave Lyon; Tony Stolfo and Martin Love (hatchback)

Body and chassis
- Body style: 4-door sedan; 5-door hatchback; 5-door station wagon
- Platform: GM Delta II platform
- Related: Opel Astra; Buick Verano; Chevrolet Cavalier; Chevrolet Orlando (first generation)

Powertrain
- Engine: Gasoline: 1.4 L LUJ turbo I4; 1.4 L LUV turbo I4; 1.6 L LDE I4; 1.6 L Ecotec turbo I4; 1.8 L LUW I4; 1.8 L LWE I4; 1.8 L 2H0 I4; Diesel: 1.7 L VCDi (GM) I4; 1.6 L MDE turbo I4; 2.0 L LUZ (GM/Fiat) turbo I4; 2.0 L VCDi (VM Motori) turbo I4; 2.0 L VCDi (GM) turbo I4
- Transmission: 5-speed manual; 6-speed M32 manual; 6-speed F40 manual; 6-speed GM 6T30 automatic; 6-speed GM 6T40 automatic; 6-speed Aisin-Warner AF40-6 automatic

Dimensions
- Wheelbase: 2,685 mm (105.7 in)
- Length: Sedan: 4,597 mm (181.0 in); Hatchback: 4,510 mm (177.6 in); Wagon: 4,681 mm (184.3 in)
- Width: 1,788–1,797 mm (70.4–70.7 in)
- Height: 1,477 mm (58.1 in)
- Curb weight: 1,366–1,576 kg (3,011–3,475 lb)

Chronology
- Successor: Holden Astra (BK/BL) (Australasia)

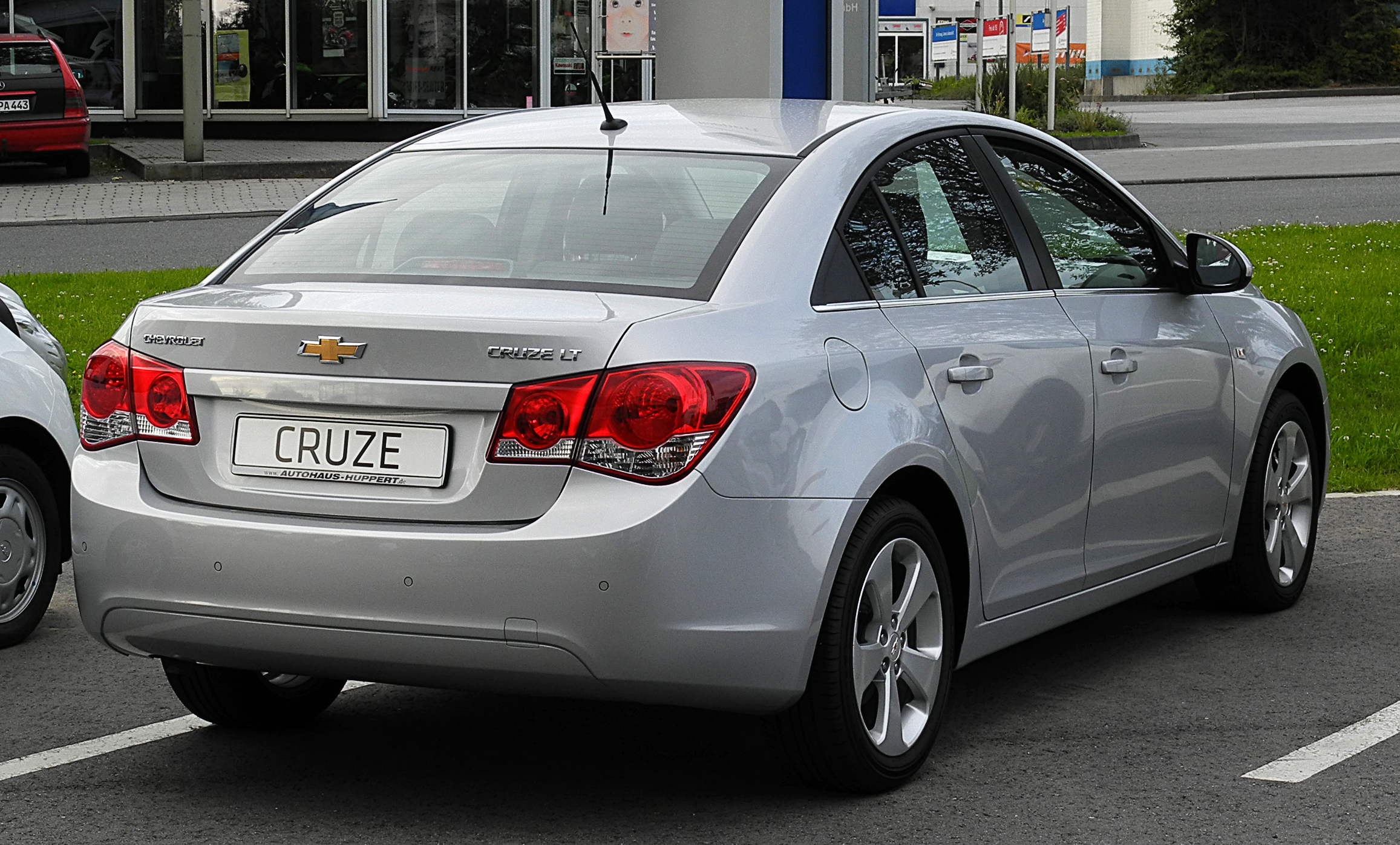
Sedan (pre-facelift)

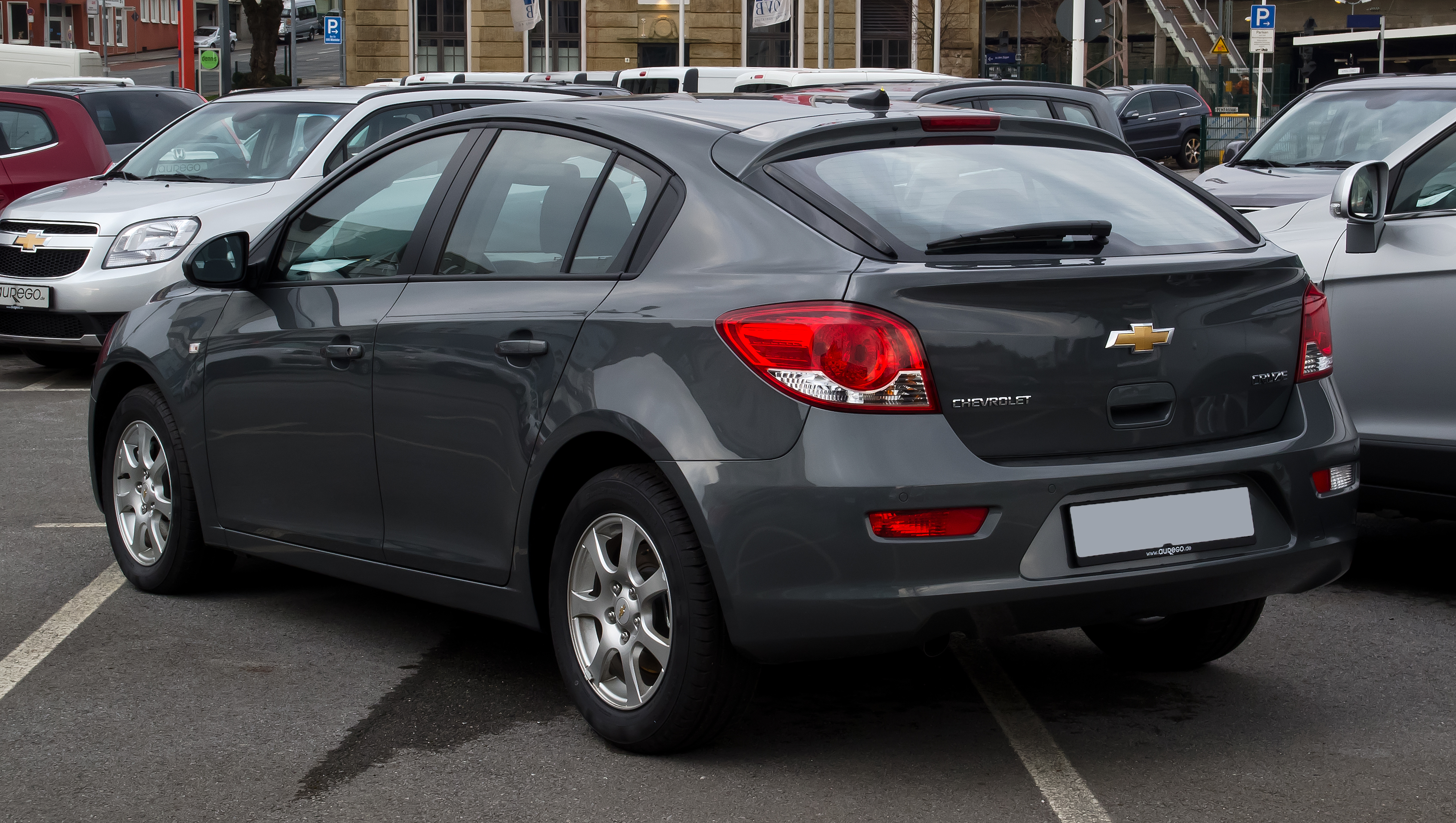
Hatchback (pre-facelift)

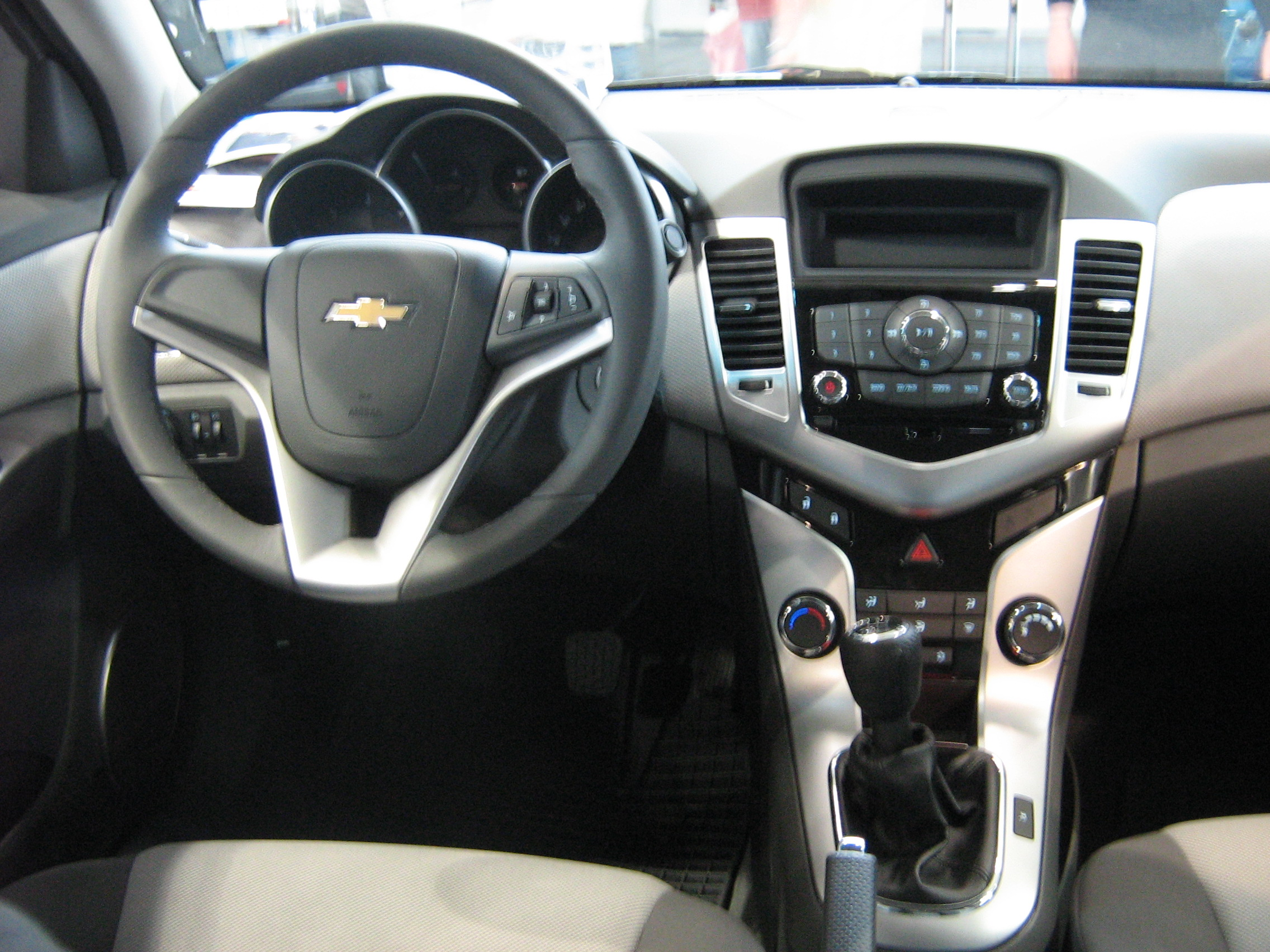
Interior

In 2008, GM introduced the Cruze compact car, carrying the "J300" internal designation. Mainly developed by GM Korea, this J300 iteration serves as a replacement for the Chevrolet Cobalt, Daewoo Lacetti and Holden Astra compact cars. GM phased out production of the Cobalt and its badge engineered counterpart, the Pontiac G5 in 2010, just prior to the manufacturing of the Chevrolet Cruze was to commence. The first renderings of the Cruze were revealed by GM at a press conference on July 15, 2008, with the first official images released on August 21, 2008.

At the ceremony of the start of production of Cruze at Ohio, Mark Reuss, the president of GM's North American operations said, "This is everything for us". It is described as GM's most significant new vehicle introduction into North America since the Chapter 11 reorganization in 2009, and is GM's latest attempt to build a small size car that North American consumers would "buy because they like it – not simply because it is cheap".

Underpinned by the front-wheel drive GM Delta II platform, GM has confirmed the Cruze development program occurred under a global design and engineering team. GM Daewoo in South Korea played a leading role in the design and engineering of the Cruze, along with GM's German-based Opel division. This development program spanned over 27 months at a cost of US$4 billion. A total of 221 prototypes were tested in Australia, Canada, China, South Korea, Sweden, the United Kingdom and the United States.

According to GM, the Cruze's body structure is 65 percent high-strength steel. MacPherson struts are utilized in the front suspension with a solid torsion beam axle for the rear, avoiding the cost and complexity needed for a modern multi-link independent rear suspension used by some more expensive rivals.

According to GM's global product development chief Mark Reuss, the North America version Cruze is modified from the global platform as it requires reinforcements to the engine compartment because it offers a bigger engine than in other markets and uses torsion beam suspension.

Hydraulically-assisted (electric for North American market) rack and pinion steering gives for a 10.9-meter (36 ft) turning circle. Braking-wise, ventilated front, and solid rear disc brakes are employed, both using piston steel calipers. To counteract noise, vibration, and harshness, engineers have designed the Cruze with an isolated four-point engine mount and implemented sound damping material in areas including the front-of-dashboard panel, luggage compartment, decklid internals, doors, carpet and headlining. Further noise suppression through the use of a triple-layer sealing system in the doors has also been employed.

A five-door Cruze hatchback was unveiled as a concept car at the 2010 Paris Motor Show on October 1, 2010. Cruze hatchback sales began in Europe in mid-2011. Holden in Australia were responsible for the design and development of the hatchback body variant.

GM unveiled the Chevrolet Cruze station wagon in February 2012 at the Geneva Motor Show. Load space ranges from about 500 litres (20 cu ft) up to the window line in the rear, to nearly 1,500 litres (50 cu ft) up to the roof top with the rear seats folded down.

=== Production ===
Cruze production sites include Gunsan, Jeonbuk, South Korea; Saint Petersburg, Russia; Shenyang, China; and Halol, India; Hanoi, Vietnam since April 2010 in complete knock-down (CKD) form, Ust-Kamenogorsk, Kazakhstan from May 2010; Rayong, Thailand after December 2010, and São Caetano do Sul, Brazil from 2011. Holden's localized hatchback version of the Cruze built at the Holden Elizabeth Plant from late 2011 joined the Cruze sedan manufactured there since March 2011. GM in the United States has upgraded the existing plant in Lordstown, Ohio to manufacture the Cruze, investing more than US$350 million.

=== Safety ===
The Australasian New Car Assessment Program (ANCAP) in May 2009 awarded the Cruze five out of five stars in their crash safety test, with 35.04 out of a possible 37 points. The following July, the China New Car Assessment Program (C-NCAP) awarded the Cruze five out of five stars in their test. The Cruze SE 1.6-liter tested scored 16 points in side-impact collision, 14.44 in front-end collision, and 15.73 in the 40 percent frontal offset collision. Euro NCAP graded the Cruze at five out of five stars as well—96 percent for adult protection, and 84 percent for child occupant protection, though the rating for pedestrian protection was a much lower 34 percent. The South Korean-specification Cruze—the Daewoo Lacetti Premiere—received the top rating of five stars in the Korean New Car Assessment Program's (KNCAP) frontal, offset frontal, side, and whiplash tests.

The Cruze in its most basic Latin American version received 4 stars for adult occupants and 3 stars for infants from Latin NCAP in 2011.

Latin NCAP 1.0 test results Chevrolet Cruze LT + 2 Airbags (2011, based on Euro NCAP 1997)
Test	Points	Stars
Adult occupant:	13.18/17.0	4 /5 stars
Child occupant:	32.59/49.00	3 /5 stars

In the United States, the Cruze received the highest possible ratings of "good" in front moderate overlap, side, rear and rollover crash protection tests by the Insurance Institute for Highway Safety (IIHS), who listed the Cruze as a 2011 Top Safety Pick. The Cruze received a "marginal" rating in the small overlap test. The National Highway Traffic Safety Administration (NHTSA) gave the Cruze the agency's highest five-star safety rating, based on its score for frontal impact (driver and passenger), side impact (driver and passenger), and for the side pole test (driver). NHTSA graded the Cruze at four out of five stars for rollover safety performance.

IIHS scores
Small overlap front (Driver)	Marginal
Moderate overlap front	Good
Side (original test)	Good
Roof strength	Good
Head restraints and seats	Good

ANCAP test results* Holden Cruze 4 door wagon (2002)
Test	Score
Overall	3 /5 stars
Frontal offset	7.35/16
Side impact	12.18/16
Pole	Not Assessed
Seat belt reminders	0/3
Whiplash protection	Not Assessed
Pedestrian protection	Marginal
Electronic stability control	Not Assessed

ANCAP test results* Holden Cruze all variants (2009)
Test	Score
Overall	5 /5 stars
Frontal offset	15.04/16
Side impact	16/16
Pole	2/2
Seat belt reminders	2/3
Whiplash protection	Good
Pedestrian protection	Marginal
Electronic stability control	Standard

=== Reliability and recalls ===
According to Consumer Reports, during its first year, the Cruze scored the lowest in reliability among compact sedans.

GM announced in April 2011 that 2,100 Cruzes in North America would be recalled following a report of the steering wheel breaking away from the steering column during motion.

On June 22, 2012, GM issued a recall for 413,418 Cruzes manufactured at the Lordstown, Ohio plant, to address a risk of engine compartment fires. The recall covered 2011 and 2012 models built from September 2010 through May 2012 and affected vehicles sold in the United States, Canada, and Israel. The fire hazard arose from the possibility of fluids becoming trapped near the engine and catching fire. 9,547 Australian-built Cruzes were also recalled for this reason, though no engine fires were reported in Australia.

GM issued another recall on August 16, 2013, for 2011 and 2012-model Cruzes—292,879 cars built at the Lordstown plant—to address a potential loss of power brake assist, due to a faulty microswitch in the power brake vacuum pipe assembly of Cruzes with the 1.4-liter engine and the 6T40 automatic transaxle. GM stated awareness of 27 low-speed crashes due to brake issues that might have involved this fault.

On March 28, 2014, GM halted sales of 2013- and 2014-model Cruzes with 1.4-liter engines (about 60% of Cruzes), initially without stating a reason for the stop-sale order; subsequently GM disclosed that the issue was a faulty right-side axle shaft.

=== 2012 update ===
The Cruze was given a mild facelift for 2013, unveiled at the 2012 Geneva Motor Show. There was a new front fascia with redesigned air vents around the fog lamps, and the grille and headlamps also received minor updates. New alloy wheels were offered, and GM's optional MyLink entertainment system became available. This model was first sold in South Korea, then Malaysia, then in other markets.

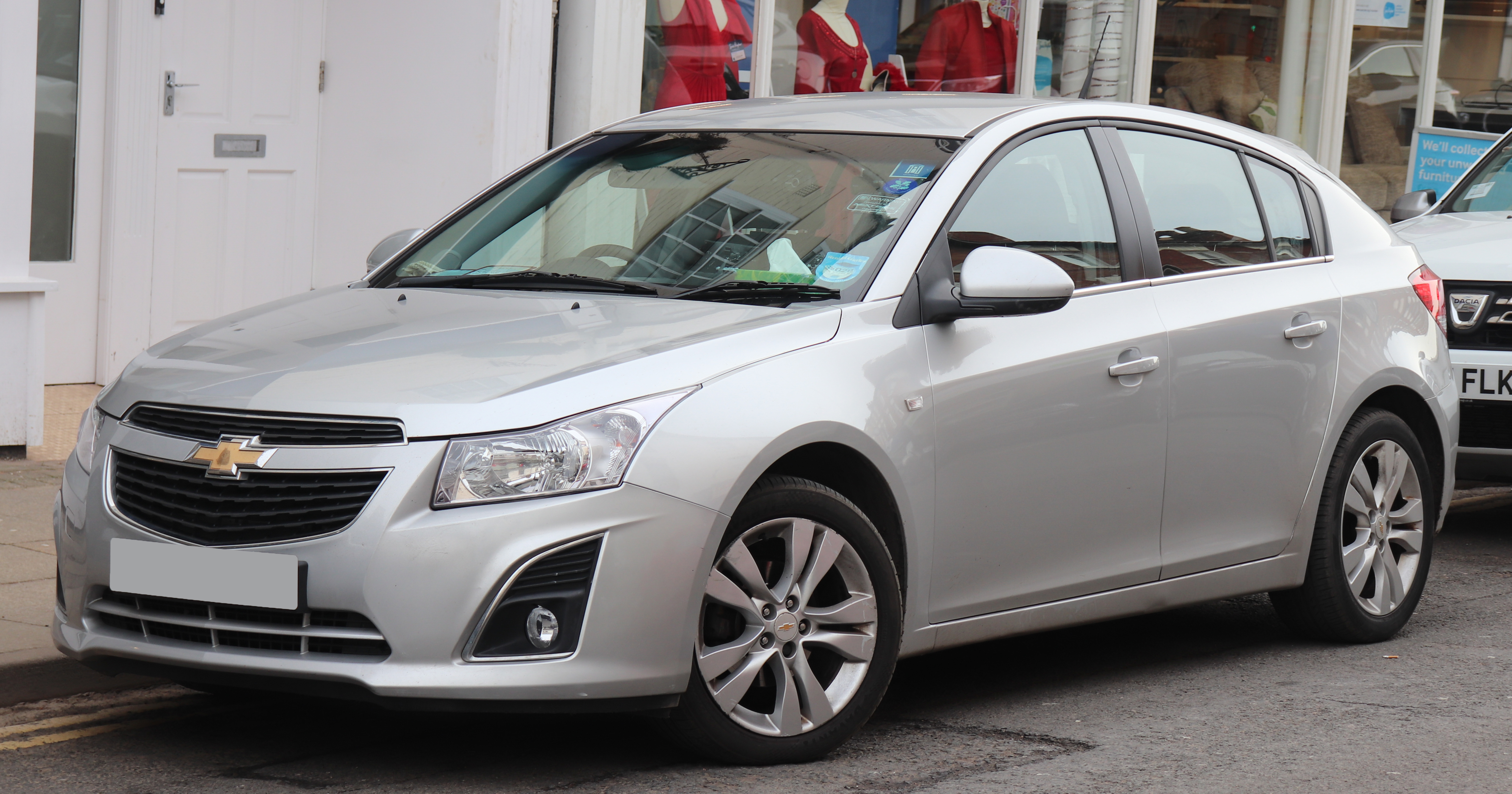
2012 facelift (hatchback)

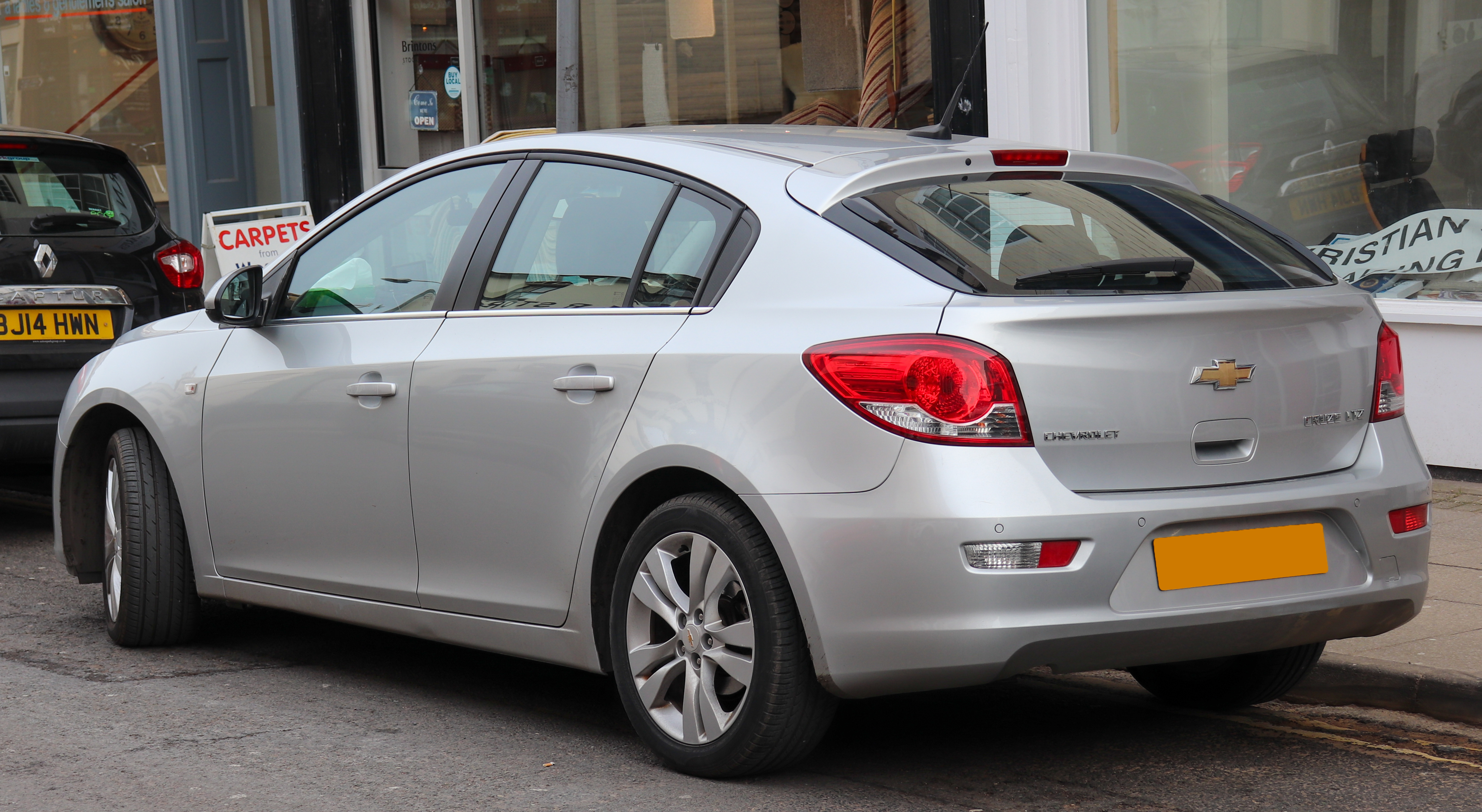
2012 facelift (hatchback)

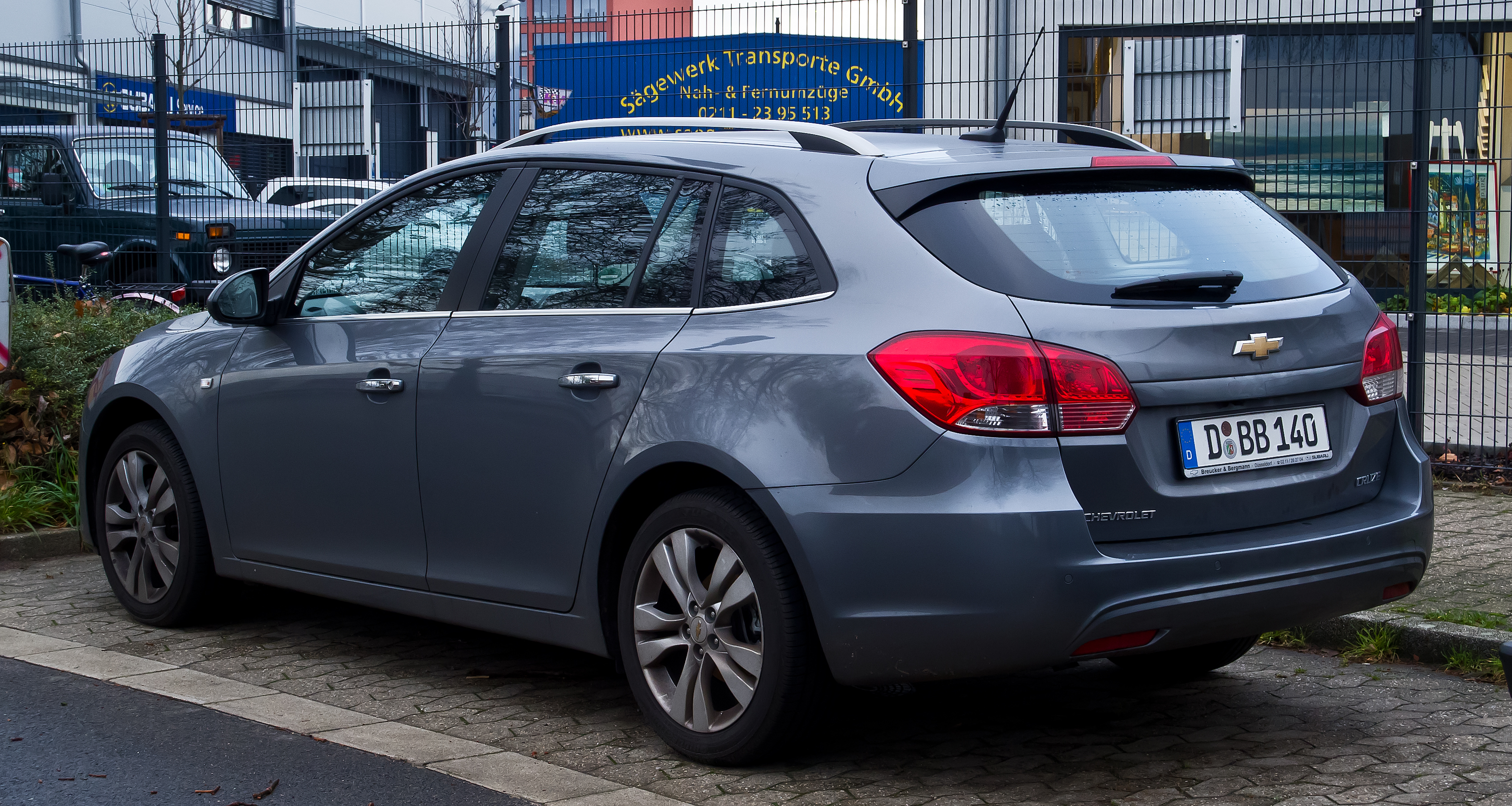
2012 facelift (wagon)

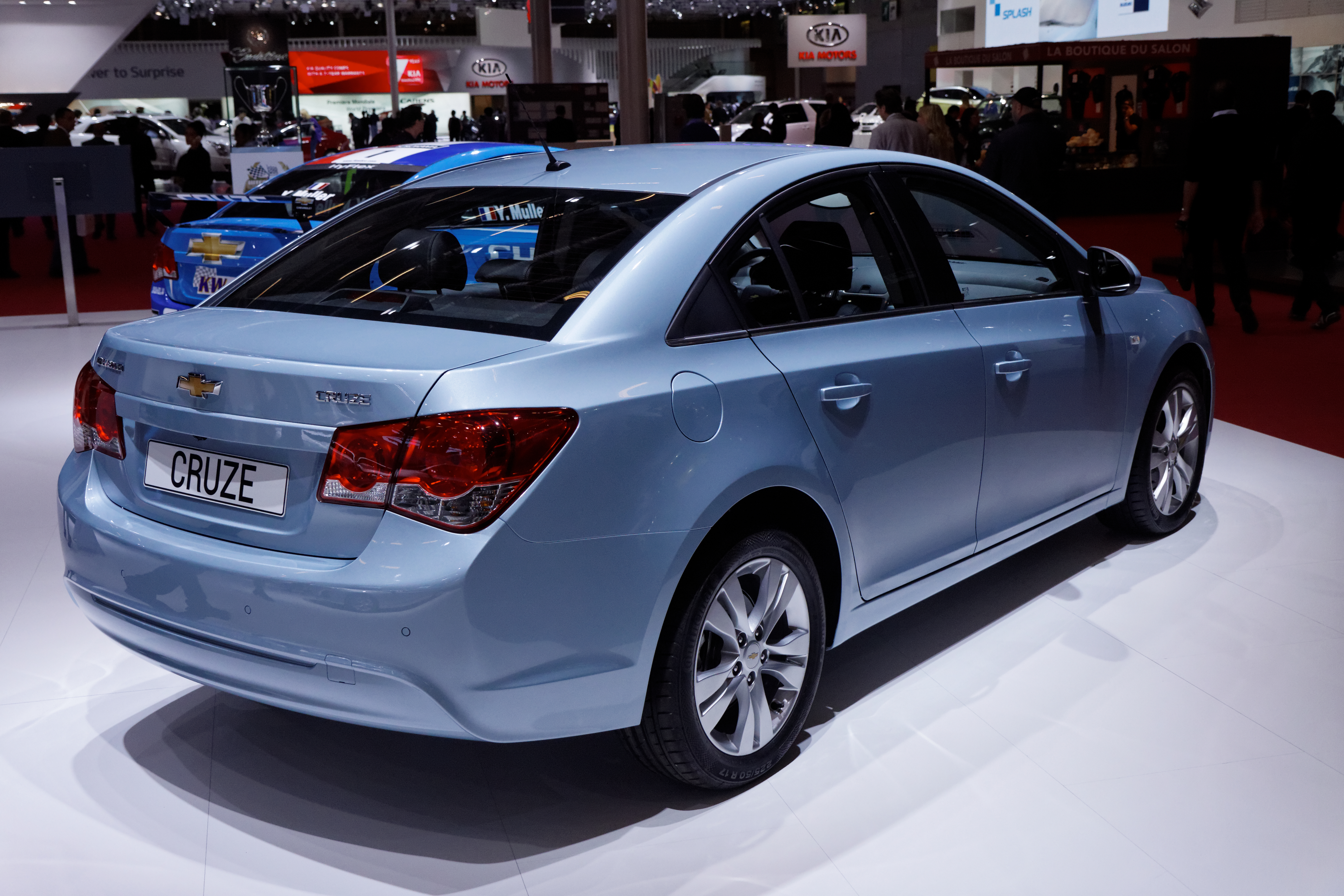
2012 facelift (sedan)

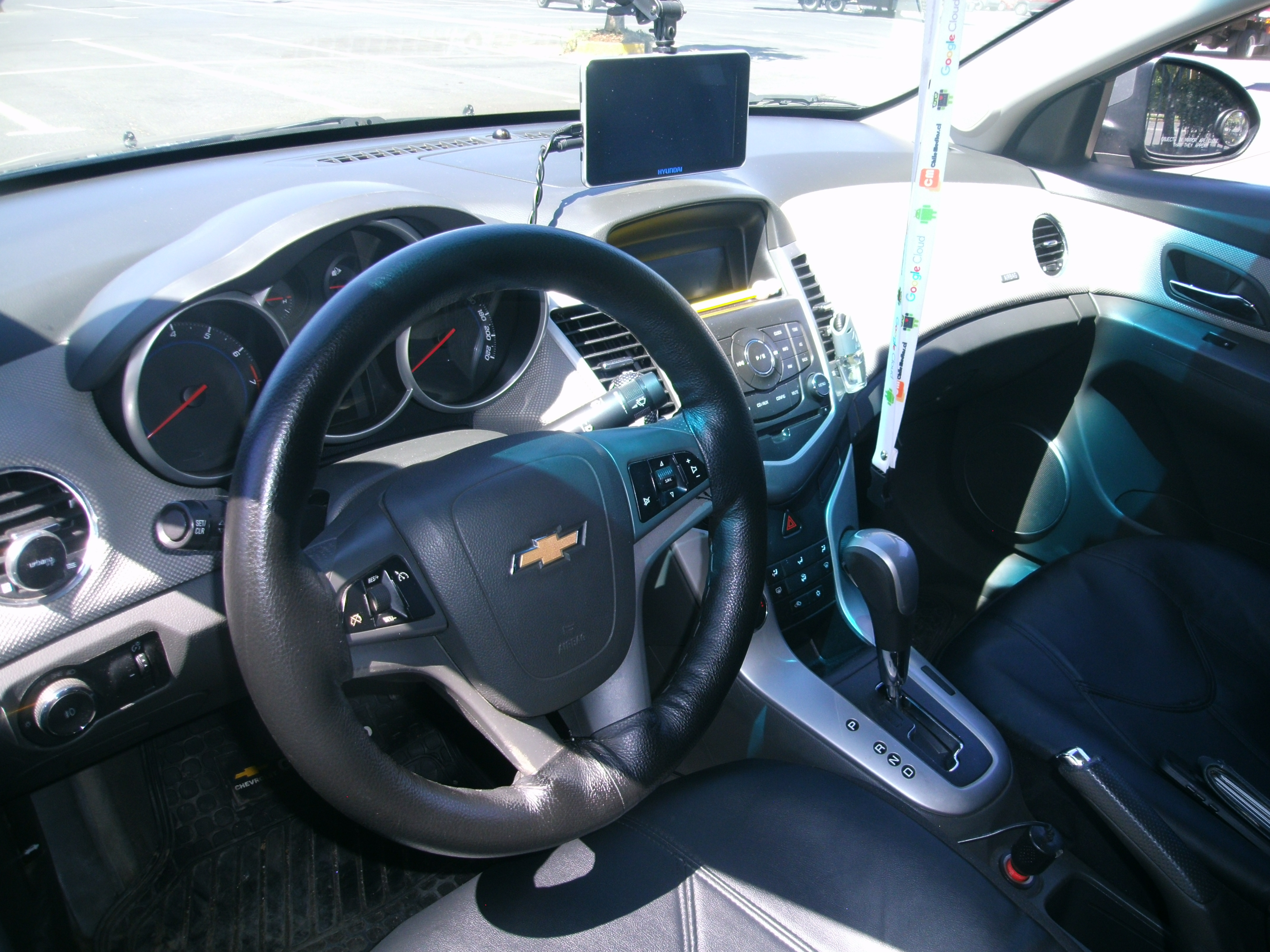
Interior (first and second facelift)

==== Safety ====
The 2014 Cruze was tested by the IIHS and received a Top Safety Pick award:

IIHS scores
Small overlap front (Driver)	Marginal
Moderate overlap front	Good
Side (original test)	Good
Roof strength	Good
Head restraints and seats	Good

=== 2014 update ===
On April 12, 2014, at the New York International Auto Show, Chevrolet announced a refreshed 2015-model Cruze with an updated grille and a more angular shape similar to that of the Malibu. For Asian markets, the car's rear end was restyled with new lamps, trunk lid, and bumper; the Chinese version also got a market-specific redesigned front end. The rear end in other markets remained unchanged.

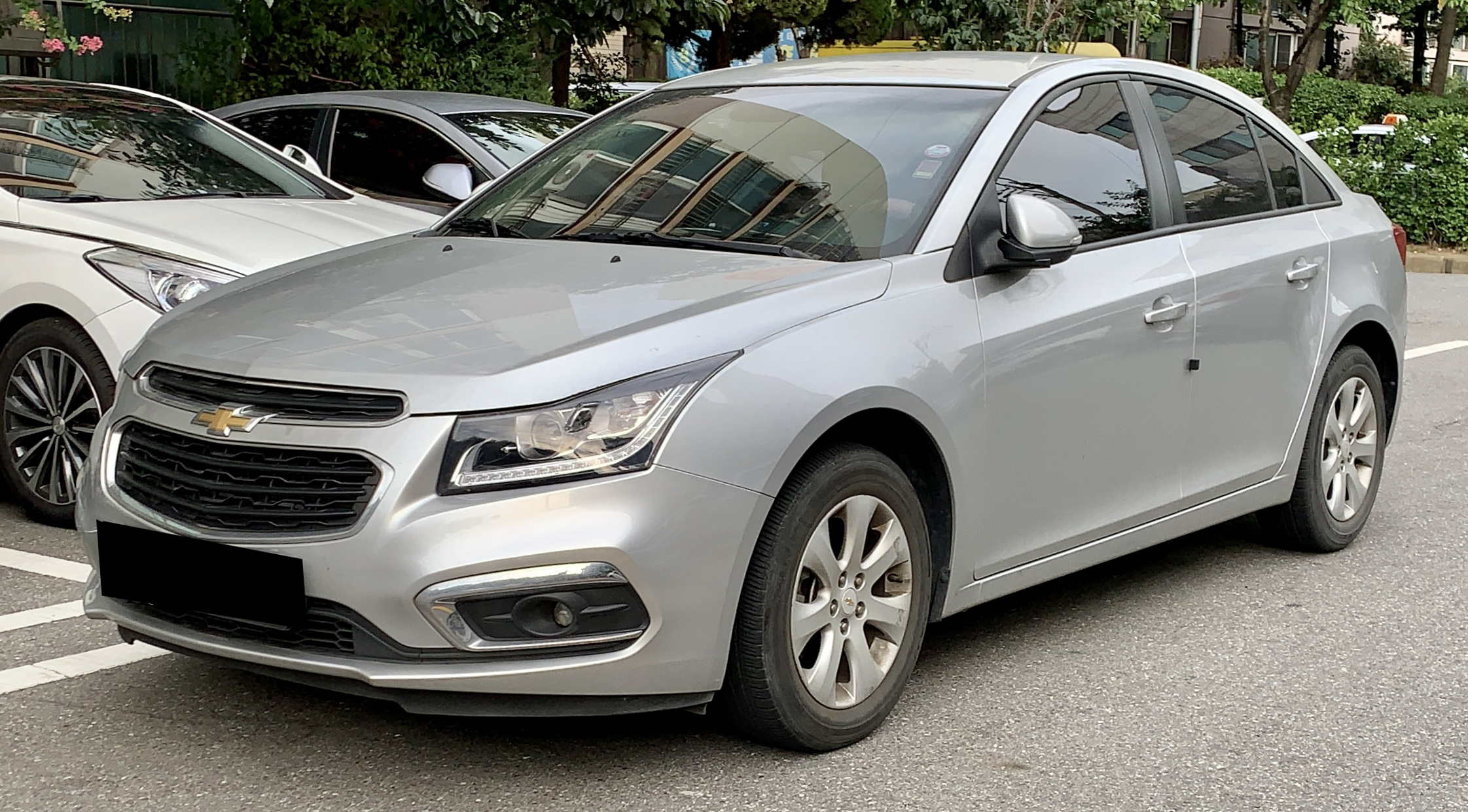
2014 facelift

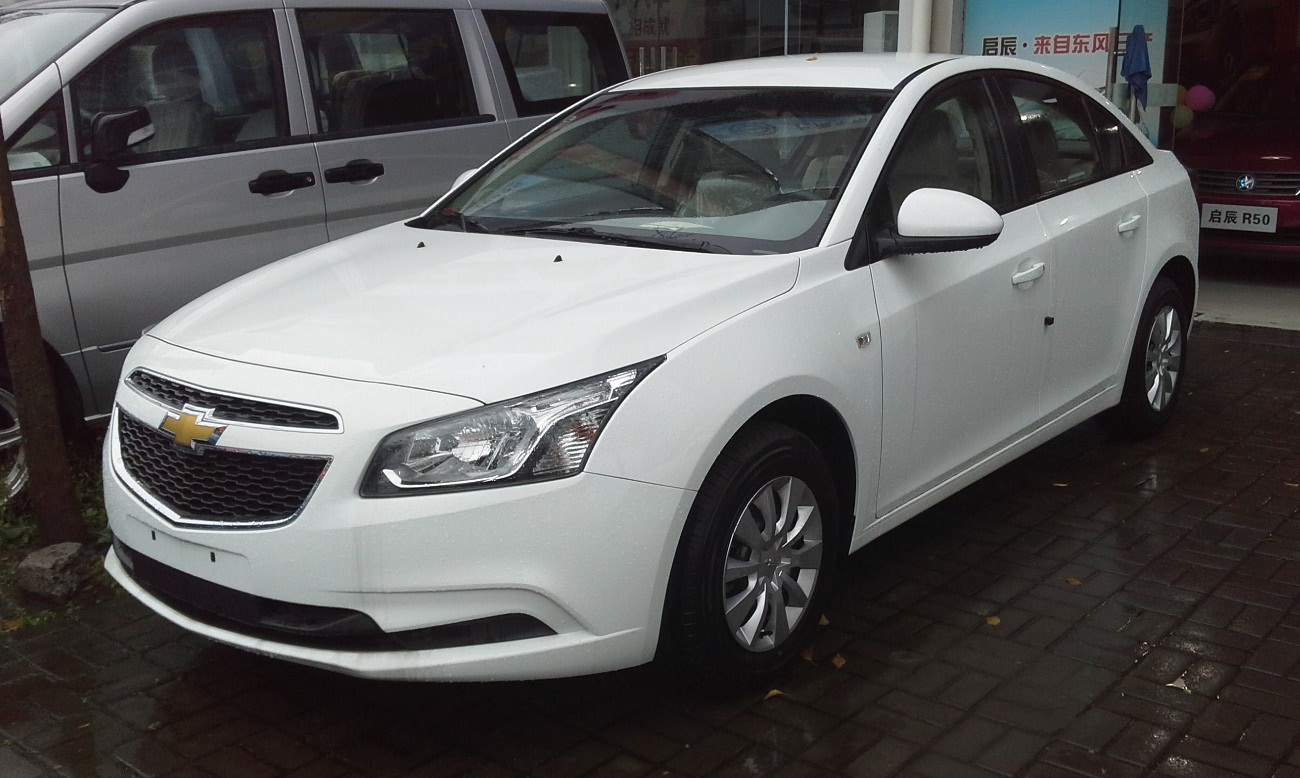
2014 facelift (sedan; China)

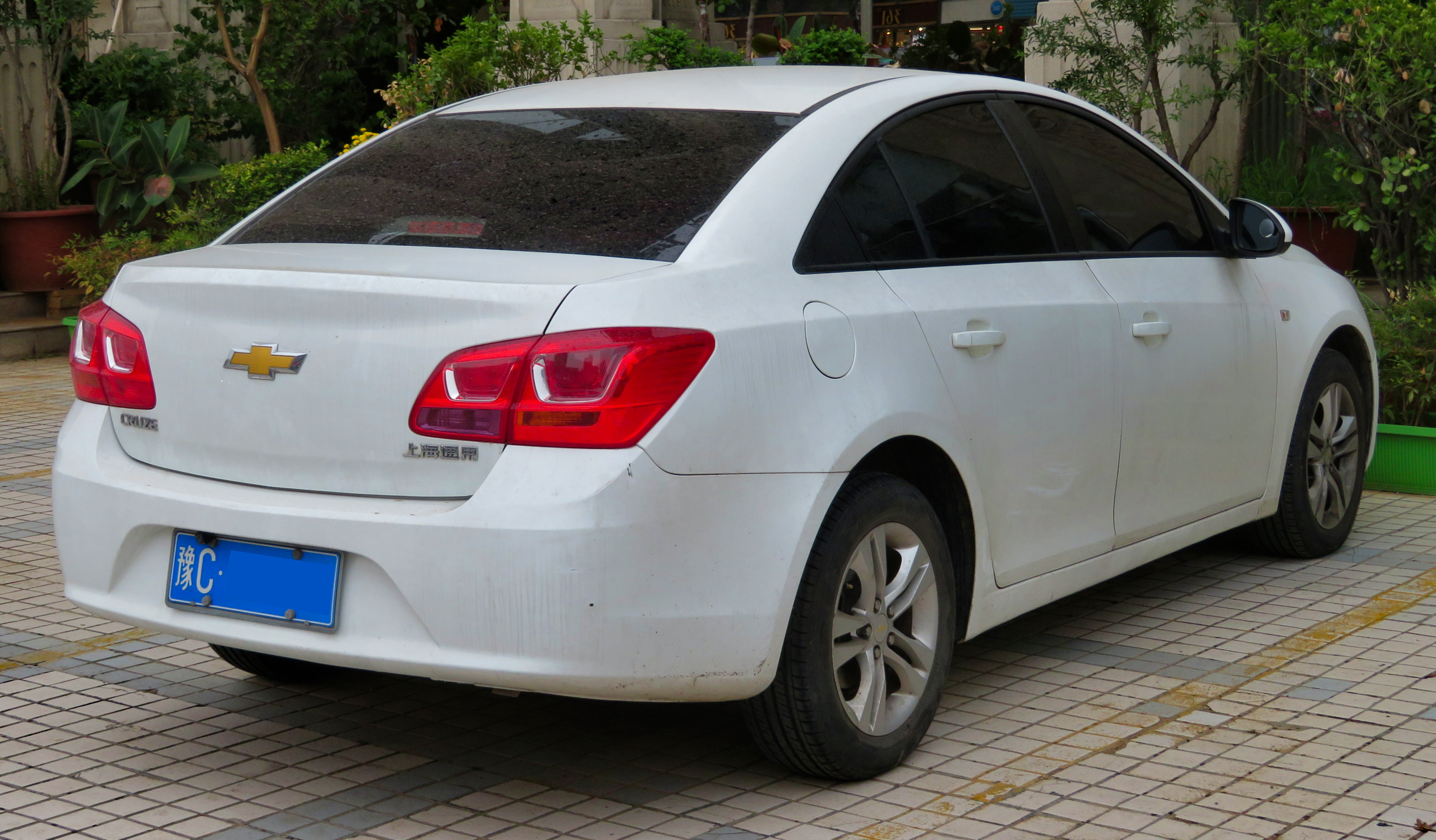
2014 facelift rear (Asia spec)

=== Powertrain ===
Engines fitted to the Cruze are the 1.6-liter Family 1 inline-four, a 1.8-liter version of the same, and a 2.0-liter VM Motori RA 420 SOHC turbocharged common rail diesel, marketed as VCDi. All three engines are coupled to a five-speed manual or optional six-speed automatic transmission featuring Active Select. When the Cruze launched in the United States in 2010, a new 1.4-liter Family 0 turbocharged gasoline engine was introduced. North American models fitted with the 1.8-liter gasoline engine have also been upgraded to a standard six-speed manual.

In 2011, a new 2.0-liter Family Z diesel engine marketed as VCDi replaced the previous VM Motori VCDi unit of equal displacement.

Since late 2011, Chinese market models have been available with a turbocharged 1.6-liter engine with a six-speed manual transmission.

Gasoline
Engine	Power	Torque	Transmission	Years
1.4 L (1,364 cc) Ecotec I4 (t/c)	103 kW (138 hp)	200 N⋅m (148 lb⋅ft) (AU/EU)	6-speed manual; 6-speed GM 6T40 automatic	2010–
1.4 L (1,364 cc) Ecotec I4 (t/c)	103 kW (138 hp)	201 N⋅m (148 lb⋅ft) (NA)	6-speed manual; 6-speed GM 6T40 automatic	2010–
1.6 L (1,598 cc) Ecotec I4	83 kW (111 hp)	153 N⋅m (113 lb⋅ft)	5-speed manual; 6-speed GM 6T40 automatic	2008–
1.6 L (1,598 cc) Ecotec I4 (t/c)	135 kW (181 hp)	235 N⋅m (173 lb⋅ft)	6-speed manual	2011–
1.8 L (1,796 cc) Ecotec I4	104 kW (139 hp) (AU/EU)	176 N⋅m (130 lb⋅ft) (AU/EU)	5-speed manual; 6-speed manual; 6-speed GM 6T30 automatic; 6-speed GM 6T40 automatic	2008–
1.8 L (1,796 cc) Ecotec I4	103 kW (138 hp) (NA)	169 N⋅m (125 lb⋅ft) (NA)	5-speed manual; 6-speed manual; 6-speed GM 6T30 automatic; 6-speed GM 6T40 automatic	2010–
Diesel
Engine	Power	Torque	Transmission	Years
1.7 L (1,686 cc) VCDi (GM) I4 (t/c)	96 kW (129 hp) (EU)	300 N⋅m (221 lb⋅ft) (EU)	6-speed manual	2012–
2.0 L (1,991 cc) VCDi (VM Motori) I4 (t/c)	110 kW (148 hp)	320 N⋅m (236 lb⋅ft)	5-speed manual; 6-speed M32 manual; 6-speed GM F40 manual; 6-speed GM 6T45 automatic	2008–2011
2.0 L (1,998 cc) VCDi (GM) I4 (t/c)	120 kW (161 hp) (AU/EU)	360 N⋅m (266 lb⋅ft) (AU/EU)	5-speed manual; 6-speed M32 manual; 6-speed GM F40 manual; 6-speed GM 6T45 automatic	2011–
2.0 L (1,956 cc) LUZ (GM/Fiat) I4 (t/c)	113 kW (151 hp) (NA)	339 N⋅m (250 lb⋅ft) (NA)	6-speed Aisin-Warner AF40-6 automatic	2014–

=== Marketing ===
Africa

The Chevrolet Cruze was launched in the Egyptian market during mid-2009. South African sales of the Cruze commenced in September 2009.

Asia

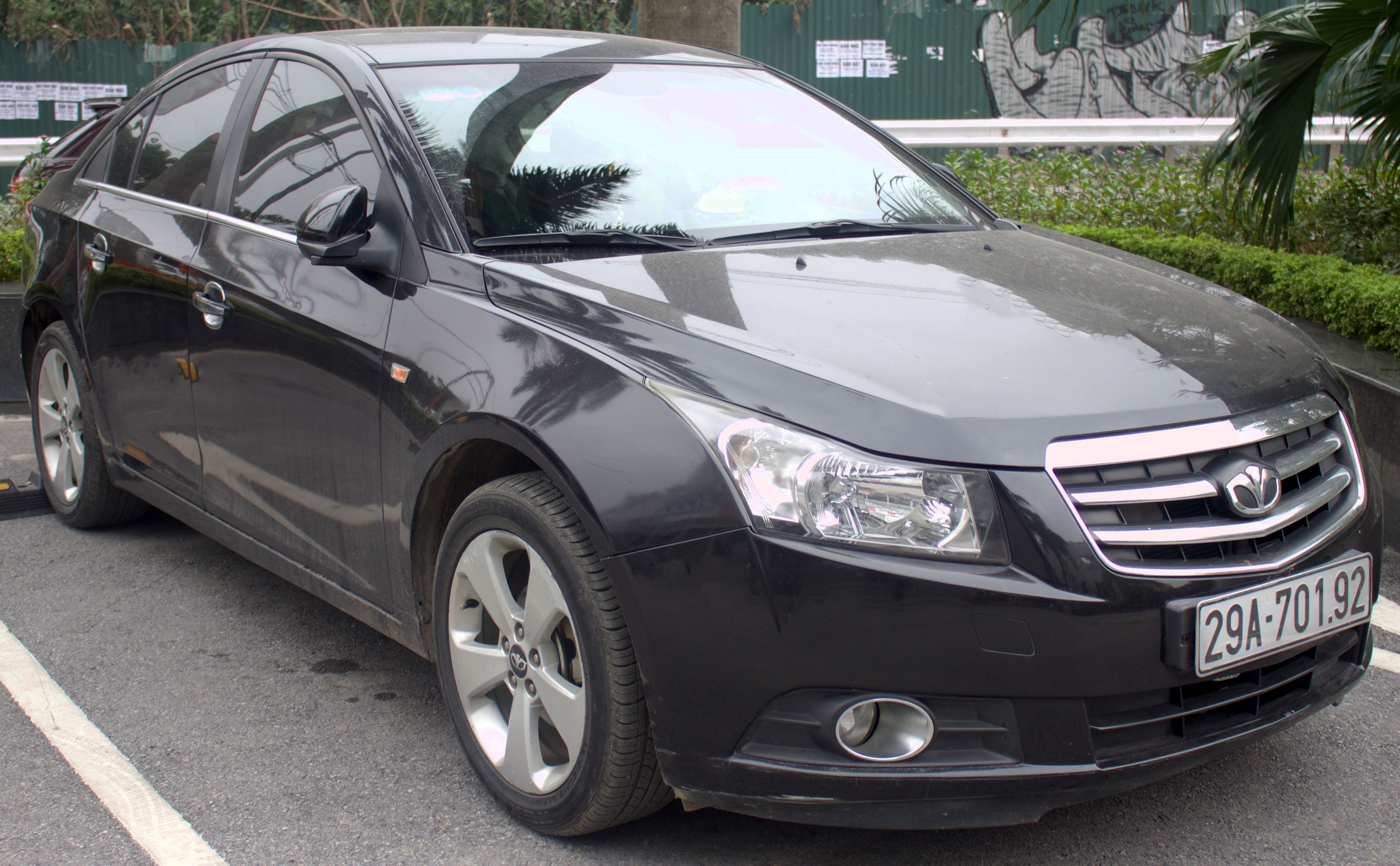
Daewoo Lacetti Premiere CDX sedan (Vietnam)

South Korean-market versions of the Cruze entered production there in 2008 as the "Daewoo Lacetti Premiere". The Lacetti debuted on October 30, 2008, featuring the 1.6-liter naturally aspirated engine. On January 30, 2009, GM Daewoo introduced the turbodiesel engine variant. Inline with the February 2011 renaming of "GM Daewoo" to "GM Korea", the Lacetti Premiere adopted the international "Chevrolet Cruze" name from March 2, 2011. For the owners of the previous model, Lacetti, GM Korea decided to replace the old emblem to that of Chevrolet for free.

The Chevrolet Cruze was launched in the Chinese market on April 18, 2009, as a sedan manufactured at GM India's Halol factory. Transmission choices were a five-speed manual or a six-speed automatic along with 1.6- or 1.8-liter engines. The sedan range consisted of the 1.6 SL, 1.6 SE, 1.8 SE (automatic only) and 1.8 SX (automatic only). Hatchback models were introduced in 2013 available with the 1.6-liter or 1.6-liter turbo engines.

The Chevrolet Cruze was released in India on October 12, 2009. It was offered in only two versions: LT and LTZ in diesel form only (VCDi).

During 2009, there were reports that the Cruze was to become available in Malaysia with the 1.6 and a 1.8-liter engines. The Naza automotive group in Malaysia has announced that it's expecting to launch the Cruze in the Malaysian market for the first time in the second quarter of 2010 and they are expecting to sell 1,200 to 1,500 units in 2010.

In Thailand, the car launch in December 2010, built at GM's Rayong facility. Specification levels comprised: Base (1.6-liter), LS (1.6- and 1.8-liter), LT and LTZ (1.8-liter), 6-speed automatic are standard in all models except 1.6 Base used 5-speed manual, with an optional 2.0-liter VCDi available on LTZ variant with 6-speed automatic.

In the Philippines, the Cruze replaced the aging Optra in 2010. The Cruze came in 3 different variants; the entry-level "1.8L" the mid-range "1.8LS" & the top-spec "1.8LT". All variants are powered by Chevrolet's 1.8L inline-four ECOTEC engine coupled to a 5-speed manual or 6-speed automatic transmission (LS & LT variants only) with manual mode (LT variant). The "LS" featured three-spoke leather-wrapped steering wheel, fabric seats, 6-disc 6-speakers audio system with MP3 playback & USB connectivity, keyless entry, immobilizer, automatic climate controls, ABS, dual front & side airbags among other features. The "LT" variant featured upgraded leather seats & 17-inch alloy wheels.

By 2011, Chevrolet introduced the "2.0LT VCDi" variant powered by a 2.0L CRDi diesel engine paired to a standard 6-speed automatic transmission with manual mode. It featured a proximity key with start/stop button. In 2014, Chevrolet launched a redesigned Cruze which featured a different frontend.

Australia

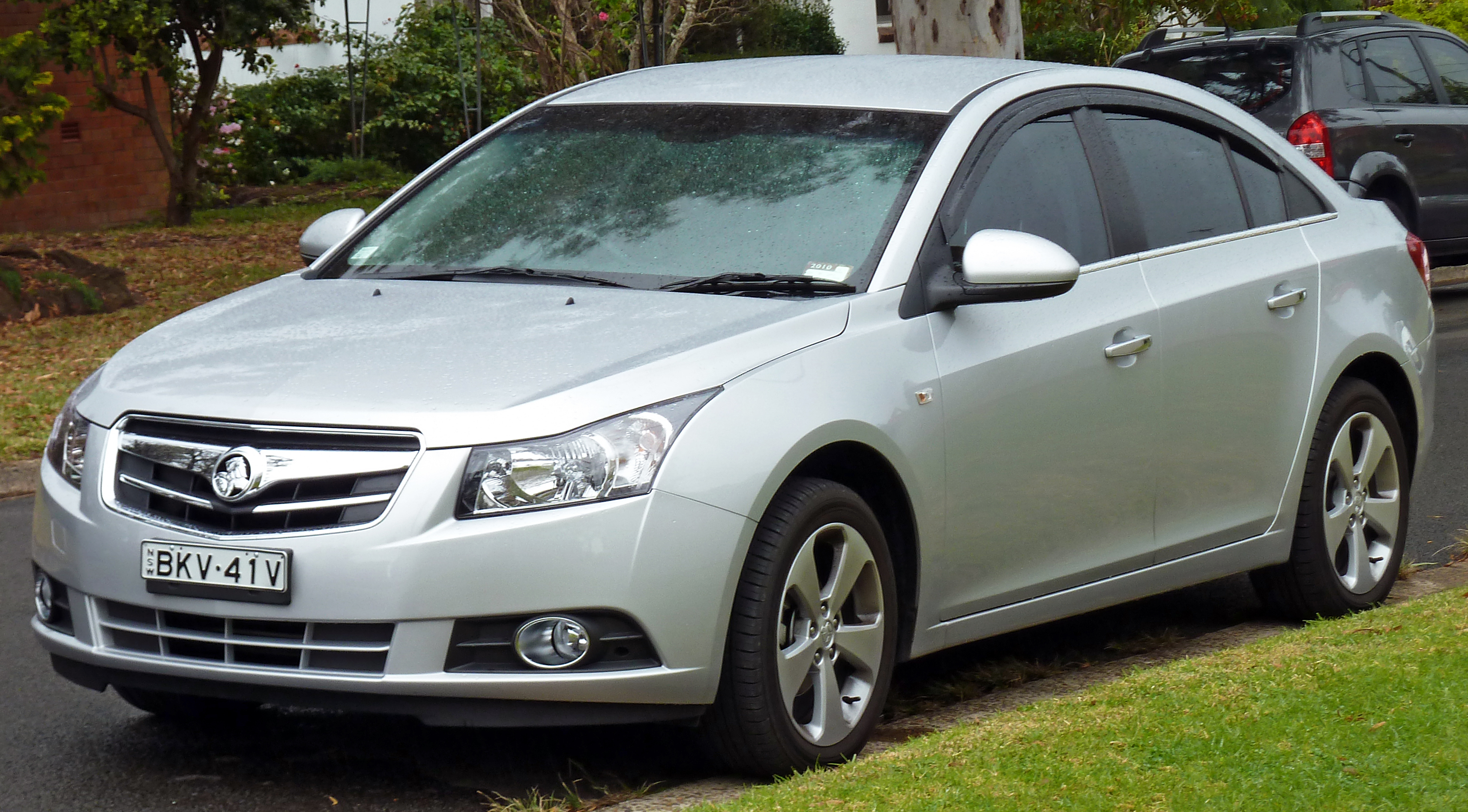

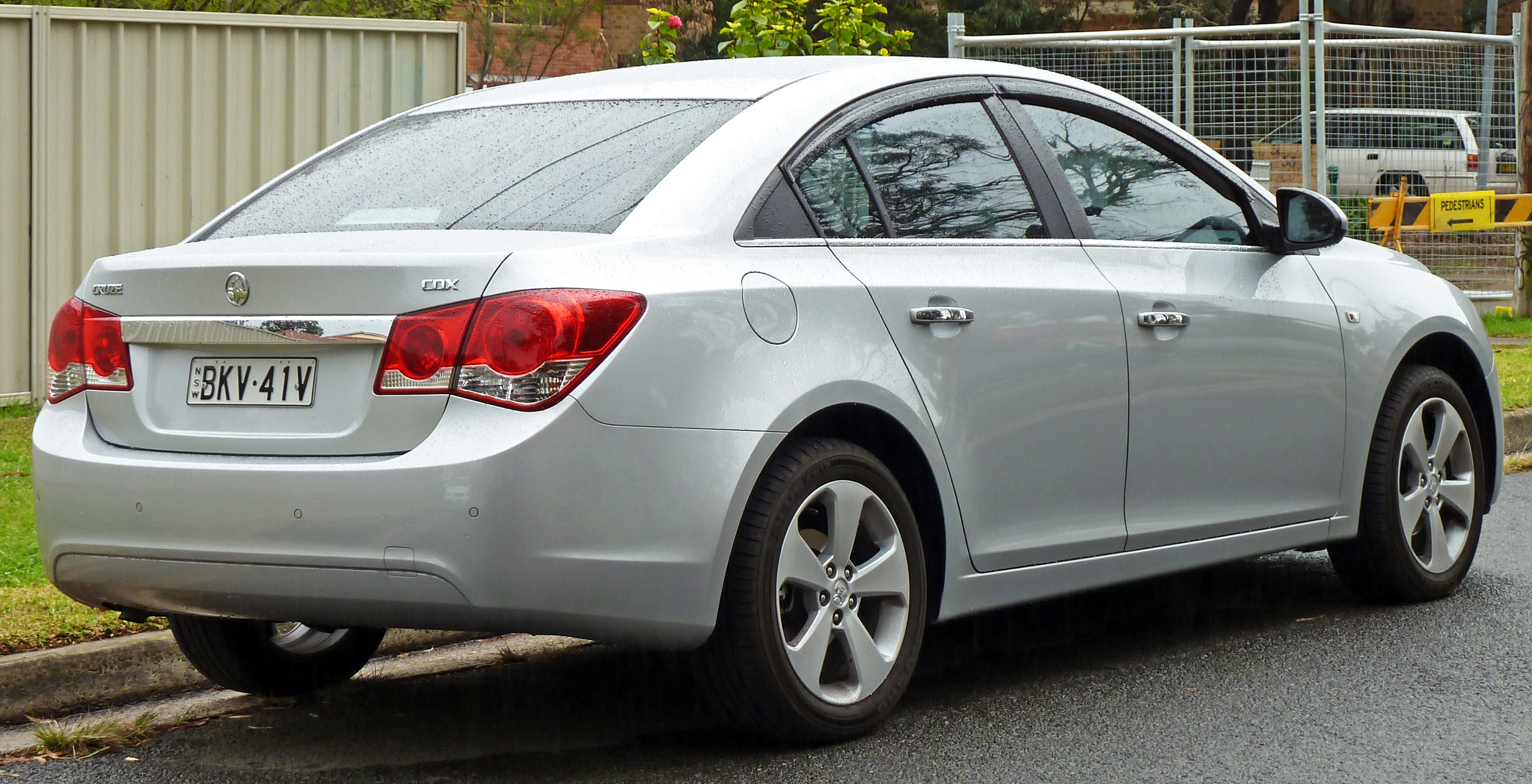
Holden Cruze CDX sedan (JG; pre-facelift)

Holden announced at the Melbourne International Motor Show on February 27, 2009, that sales of the South Korean-produced Cruze would begin under the Holden brand. Replacing the Holden Viva, the Cruze reached dealerships on June 1, 2009. The Cruze hatchback also became the replacement for the Holden Astra, dropped from the Holden lineup the following August. Given the model designation JG, the Holden Cruze was launched with the 1.8-liter petrol engine and optional 2.0-liter turbodiesel. Both engines are mated to the five-speed manual transmission or optional six-speed automatic.

On March 18, 2010, Holden issued a recall for 9,098 petrol-engined 2010 model year Cruzes in Australia and a further 485 in New Zealand over a faulty fuel hose. According to Holden, some hoses on 1.8-liter cars had developed a leakage, although no accidents or injuries had been reported prior to the recall. The recall followed a stop-delivery notice issued by Holden to its dealers on March 3 while the automaker conducted an investigation into the matter.

Holden announced on December 22, 2008, that its Elizabeth Plant production line would be split to commence local production of the Cruze sedan and the Australian-developed hatchback. Production was originally scheduled to start by September 2010. However, it was confirmed in January 2010 that production would begin in March 2011. The announcement to assemble the car came as a response to the slowing sales of the larger, locally produced Commodore range. The Australian Government committed A$149 million to the program from its $6.2 billion Green Car Innovation Fund, with a further $30 million given by the State Government of South Australia.

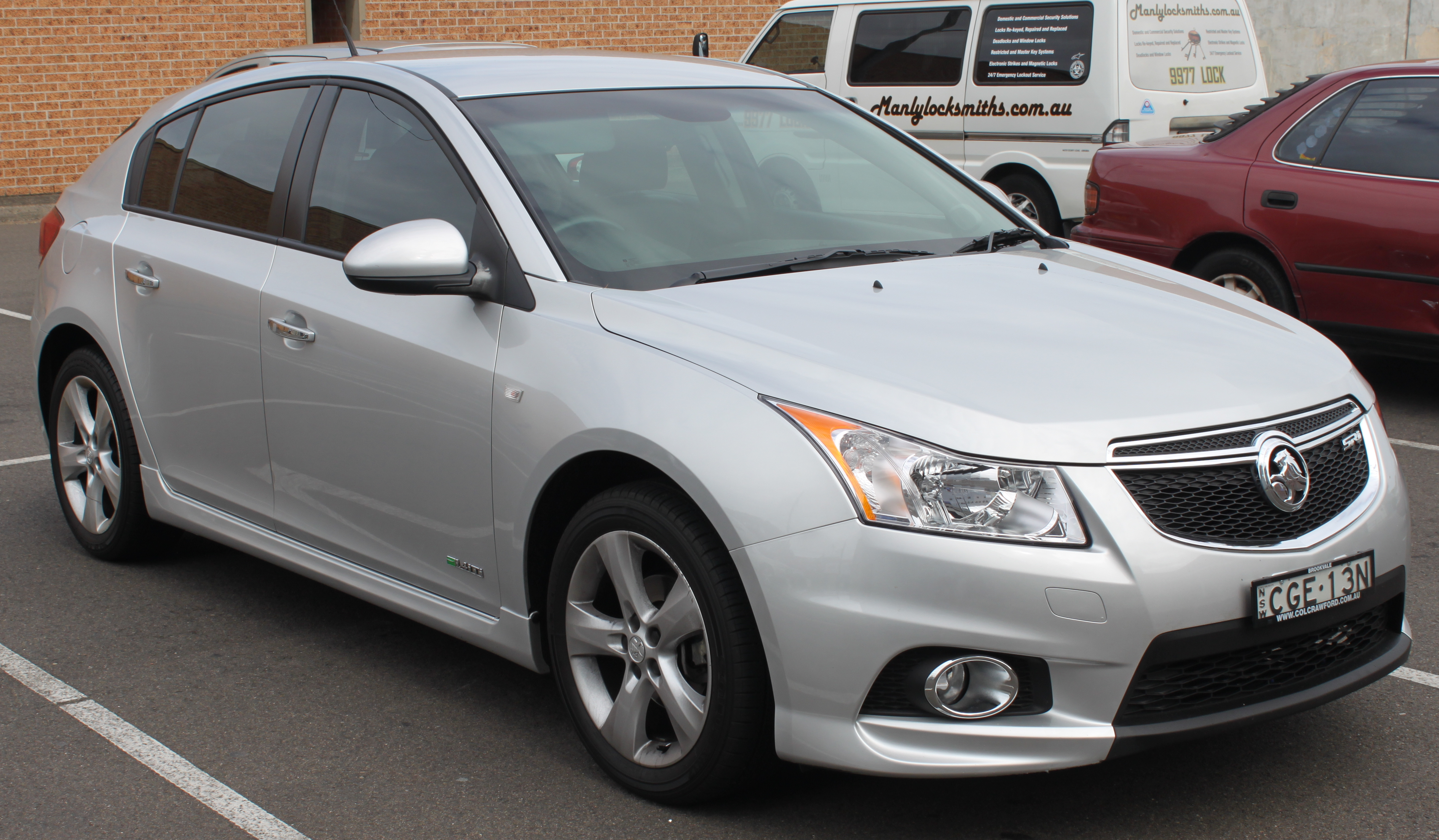

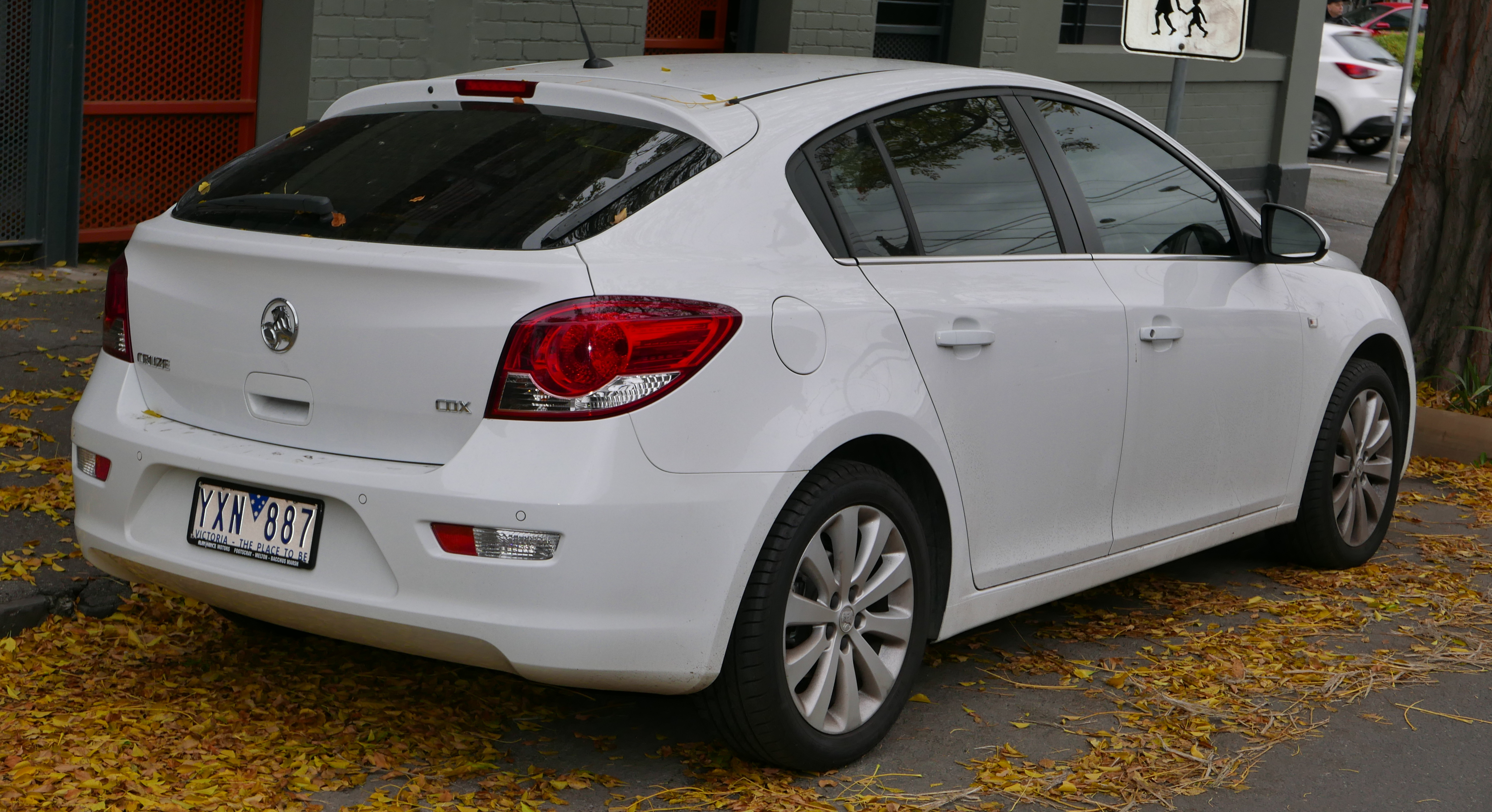
Holden Cruze hatchback (JH; first facelift)

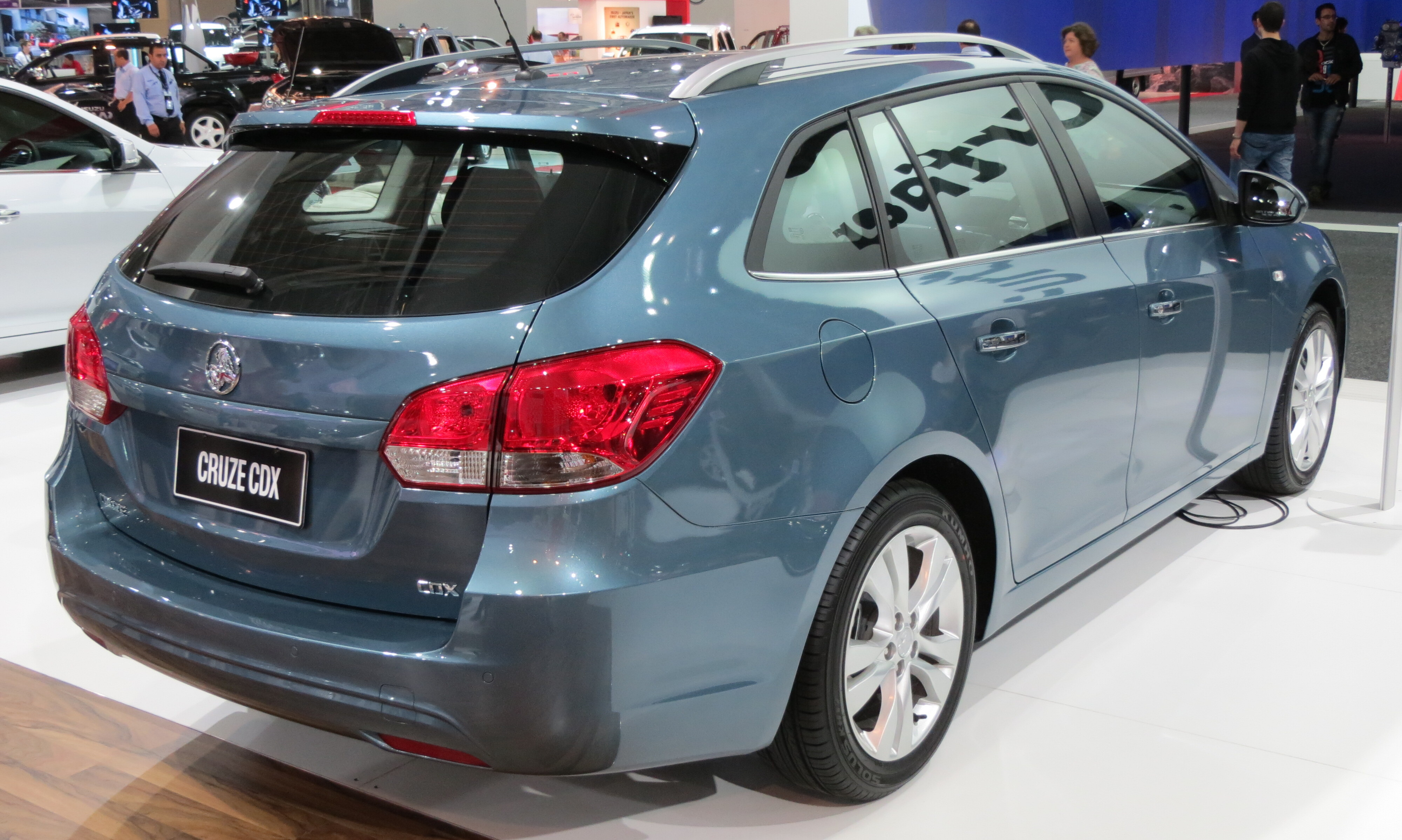
Holden Cruze station wagon (JH; first facelift)

On February 28, 2011, Holden unveiled the Australian assembled Cruze sedan in facelifted "Series II" guise, otherwise known as the JH series. Prime Minister Julia Gillard attended the February launch to drive the first example off Holden's production line before full-scale production commenced in March. Holden has confirmed an initial local content level of between 40 and 50 percent if assessed by retail value, with an aim of increasing Cruze localization over time. Series II styling revisions to the grille, lower air intake, and bumper have softened the front-end to bear a closer resemblance to Holden's larger VE II Commodore. Further differentiation from the original has been achieved via the fitment of amber front indicator lights, jewelled bezel headlamps, remodelled wheel trims, and through adjustments to the lower portion of the rear bumper. Carrying over largely unchanged is the 1.8-liter petrol inline-four, tweaked to yield slight enhancements in drivability. The 1.8-liter automatic is teamed with GM's six-speed 6T30 unit, lighter and more compact than the previous 6T40. Diesel remains optional for "CD" and "CDX" specifications over the standard 1.8-liter petrol. Alterations to the 2.0-liter turbodiesel have resulted in an additional 10 kW (13 hp) and 40 N⋅m (30 lb⋅ft) and a slight reduction in fuel consumption for the manual variant, became a six-speed unit. However, the headline change was the release of the turbocharged 1.4-liter engine, dubbed iTi by Holden for intelligent turbo induction. The inclusion of the 1.4 also brings an upgrade to electric (as opposed to hydraulic) power steering and affixes a Watt's linkage to the torsion beam rear suspension.

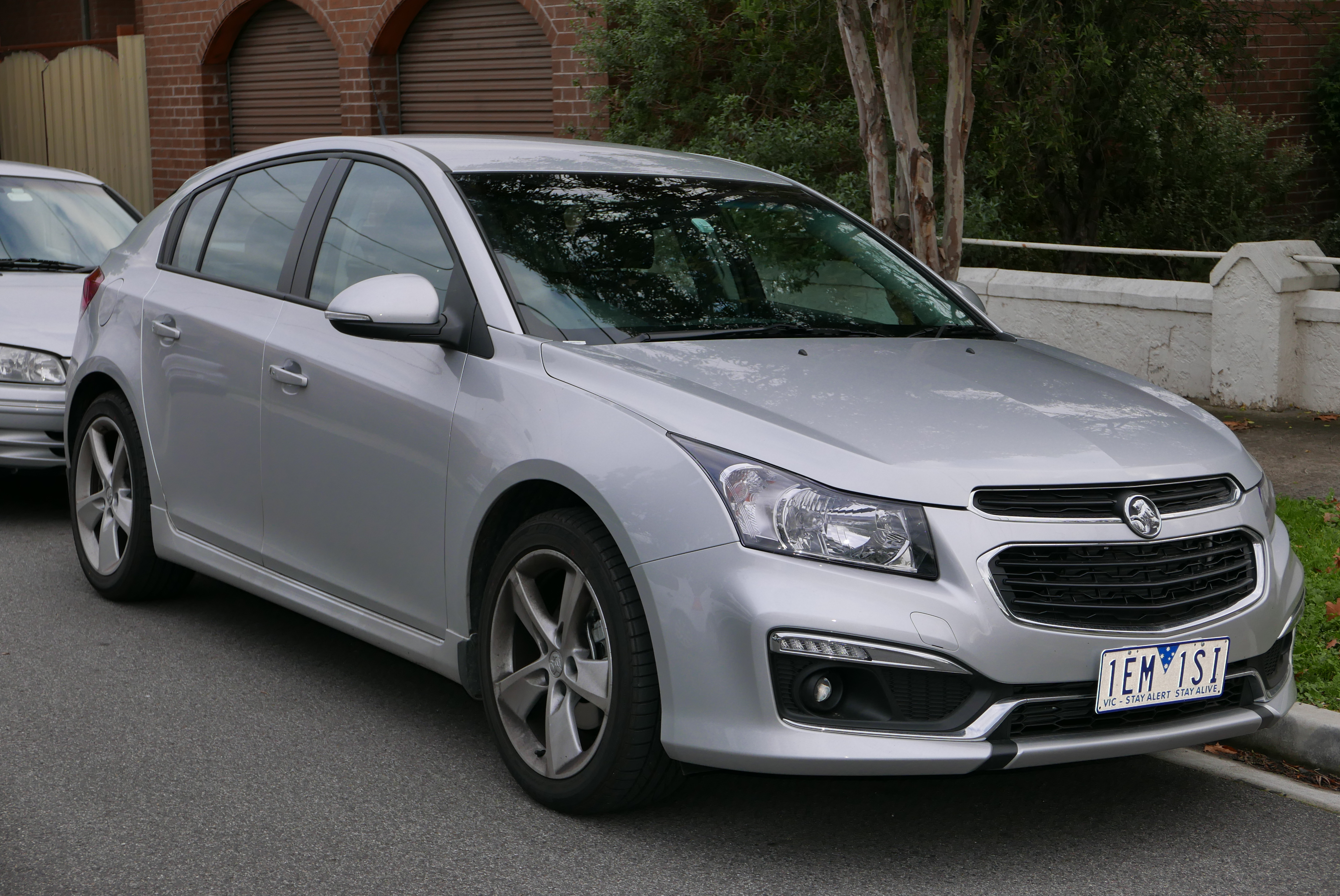
Holden Cruze SRi-V hatchback (second facelift)

In mid-November 2011, Holden released the MY12 update to the Series II Cruze. This update coincided with the release of the hatchback body variant and saw Bluetooth telephone connectivity standard across the range. In April 2013, the Series II Cruze received an update and price drops along with many other new extras such as a larger 1.6-liter turbocharged engine as standard on the SRi and SRi-V, replacing the 1.4-liter turbo.

Holden ended manufacturing of the Cruze at its Elizabeth plant on October 7, 2016, replaced by the Astra hatchback and a restyled version of the second-generation Cruze sedan, renamed to Astra Sedan.

Europe

European specification variants of the Cruze are offered with 1.6- and 1.8-litre petrol engines, and 2.0-litre and (from 2012) 1.7-litre diesel engines. In mid-2011, with the arrival of the five-door hatchback variant, the 1.6-litre petrol engine received an upgrade from 113 bhp to 122 bhp. Exports from the South Korean factory began on February 24, 2009.

North America

Mexico became the first North American country to receive the car, going on sale for the 2010 model year in late 2009. Imported from South Korea, the Chevrolet Cruze in Mexico replaces both the Chevrolet Astra (last sold in 2008) and Optra as the compact offering there.

The US and Canadian version of the Chevrolet Cruze entered limited production at Lordstown, Ohio, in July 2010 as a 2011 model, replacing the Chevrolet Cobalt. Full production began September 8, 2010. For these markets, the Cruze utilizes a more advanced Watts Z-link rear suspension from the Opel Astra (J). Offered in LS, LT, LTZ and Eco trim levels, both the 1.8-liter and the turbocharged 1.4-liter engines are offered, coupled with either a six-speed manual or automatic transmission. With a starting price slightly higher than most compact competitors, the base model Cruze LS is equipped with the 1.8-liter gasoline engine and comes with air-conditioning and power locks, the higher-level LT and LTZ models is fitted with the 1.4-liter turbocharged gasoline engine. For the Eco model, aerodynamic improvements have been made such as an electronically controlled air shutter that adjusts air flow to the engine depending on the temperature, wind speed and tow weight. To save weight, Chevrolet replaces the space saving spare tire and jack on the Eco model with a tire inflator kit, reducing weight by 12 kilograms (26 lb).

Standard safety equipment includes electronic stability control and ten airbags, including side rear-seat and front knee airbags not fitted on models produced in the original South Korea facility. The Cobalt's badge engineered twin, the Pontiac G5, has not been replaced by a Cruze-based equivalent, due to the Pontiac brand being phased out during 2010. The Cruze was built on the production lines that were used to build the Cobalt and Pontiac G5 in Lordstown, Ohio. Cobalt production ended in June 2010 and the Cruze started production in July 2010. GM has allocated three shifts to produce the Cruze and it arrived to dealers in September 2010, giving all dealers time to deplete their inventories of Cobalts.

Changes to the North American-built Cruze for model year 2012 include the availability of the six-speed manual transmission for the 1.4-litre turbocharged engine, plus models not equipped with power front seats no longer have the front seat cushion tilt option.

Starting with the 2014 model year, Chevrolet offered the Cruze with the clean diesel engine option for North America. With a starting price of $25,695, the Cruze diesel 2.0-liter Multijet engine got 44 mpg on the highway and 27 mpg in the city, while producing 148 hp (110 kW) and 258 lb⋅ft (350 N⋅m), mated to a six-speed automatic transmission. The 2014 Chevy Cruze Clean Turbo Diesel, direct from the factory, will be rated for up to B20 (blend of 20% biodiesel / 80% regular diesel) biodiesel compatibility.

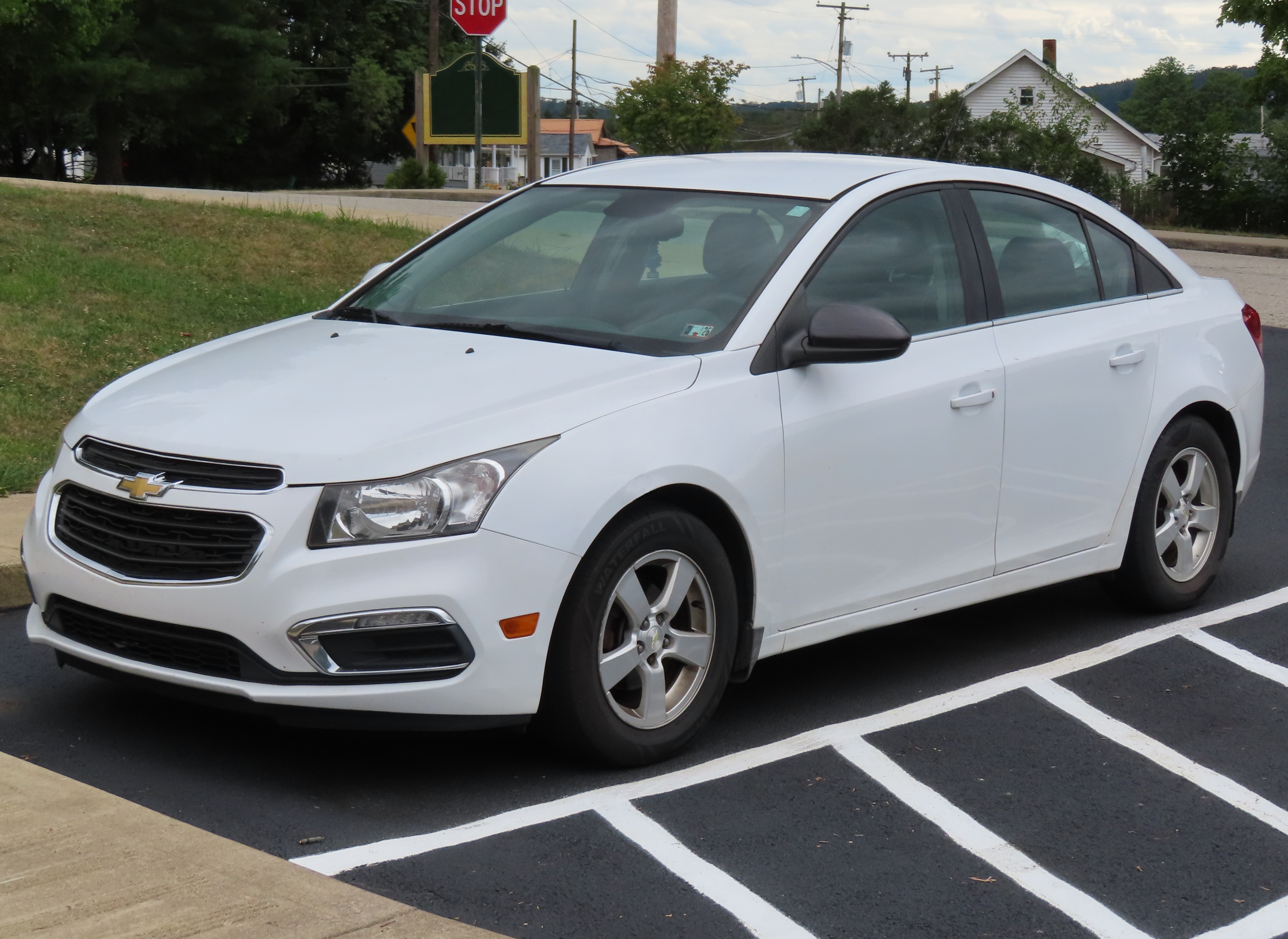
2016 Chevrolet Cruze Limited (US)

The Cruze diesel was the first GM passenger car in the US equipped with a diesel engine in 28 years, however sales were weaker than expected with 2% of US models.

For 2016, the first generation Cruze continued as a fleet and rental exclusive model in the United States, billed as Cruze Limited. The diesel model was discontinued, but a new chrome appearance package was offered.

South America

The car was launched and began production for South America in 2011.

== Second generation (J400; 2016) ==
=== International version (2016–2019, D2LC/D2LC-K) ===
Second generation
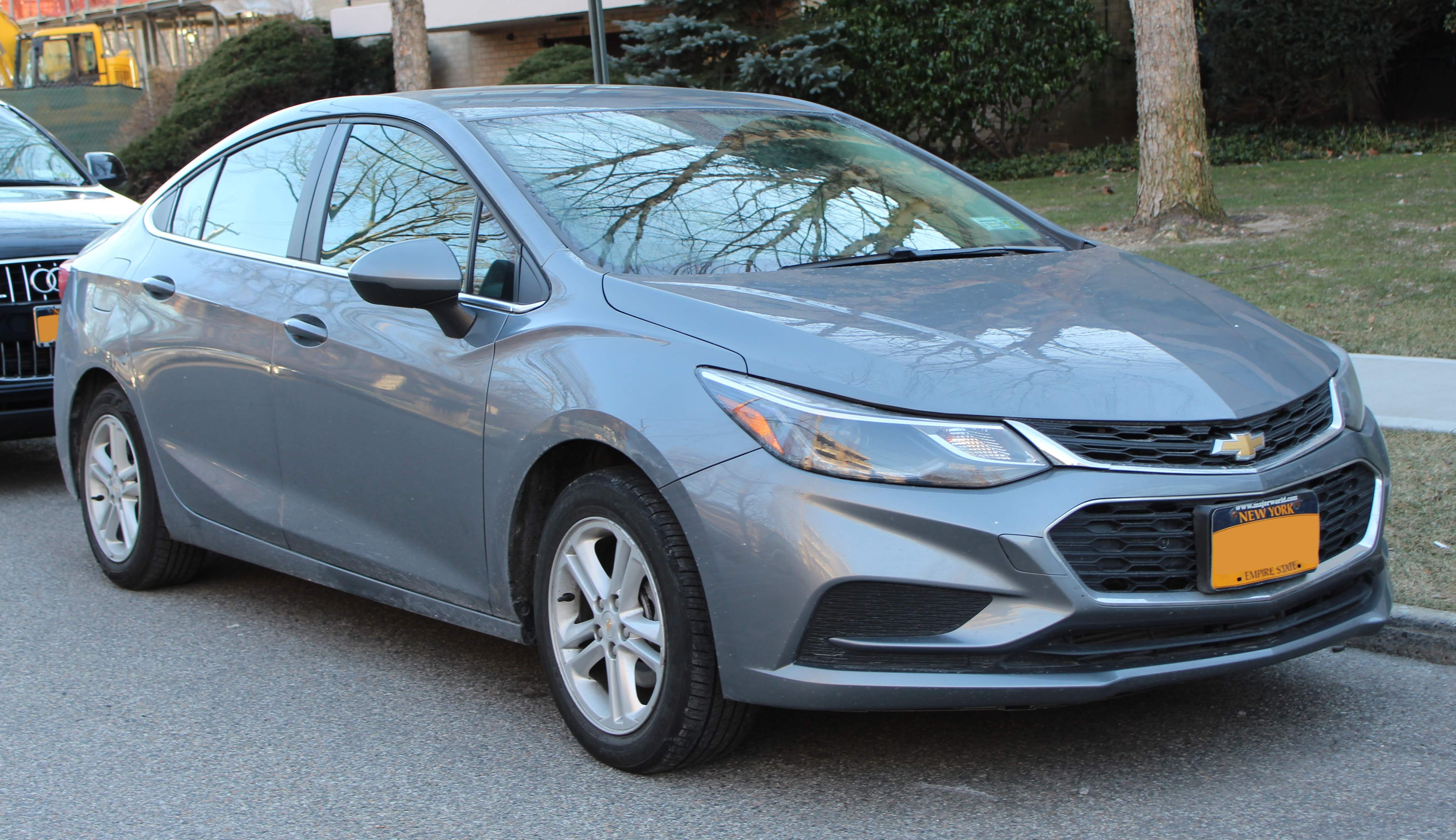
- 2018 Chevrolet Cruze LT sedan (pre-facelift)

Overview
- Model code: D2LC
- Also called: Holden Astra Sedan (Australasia)
- Production: 2016–2019 (North America); 2016–2018 (South Korea); 2017–2020 (China); 2016–2023 (Argentina)
- Model years: 2016–2019 (North America)
- Assembly: United States: Lordstown, Ohio (Lordstown Assembly, sedan); Mexico: Ramos Arizpe, Coahuila (Ramos Arizpe Assembly, hatchback); Argentina: Alvear, Santa Fe (GM Argentina); South Korea: Gunsan, Jeonbuk (GM Korea, sedan); China: Shenyang, Liaoning (SAIC-GM)
- Designer: Stuart Cooper

Body and chassis
- Body style: 4-door sedan; 5-door hatchback
- Platform: D2XX platform
- Related: Opel Astra K

Powertrain
- Engine: Gasoline: 1.4 L LE2 I4 turbo; 1.5 L SGE I4 (China); Diesel: 1.6 L MDE I4 turbo
- Transmission: 6-speed M32 manual; 6-speed GM 6T35 automatic; 7-speed DCG DCT

Dimensions
- Wheelbase: 2,700 mm (106.3 in)
- Length: 4,666 mm (183.7 in) (sedan); 4,453 mm (175.3 in) (hatchback)
- Width: 1,795 mm (70.7 in)
- Height: 1,458 mm (57.4 in) (sedan); 1,465 mm (57.7 in) (sedan)
- Curb weight: 1,302–1,356 kg (2,870.4–2,989.5 lb) (sedan); 1,323–1,351 kg (2,916.7–2,978.4 lb) (hatchback)

The second-generation Cruze began sales in North America in early 2016, delayed a year by engineering changes. The Cruze has a new external design with a new split grille front and a fastback-like sloping roofline from the Chinese version of the fastback. It is also powered by the 1.4-liter turbocharged four-cylinder engine producing 153 hp (114 kW) and 177 lb⋅ft (240 N⋅m) torque.

The 2016 Cruze comes equipped with both Apple CarPlay and Android Auto Capability features. However, only one of their phone brands at any one time can be used.

In January 2016, Chevrolet unveiled the five-door hatchback version of the North American Cruze at the North American International Auto Show. It went on sale in late 2016 as a 2017 model.

Trim levels continue to be L, LS, LT (was combined into one trim level, as opposed to the previous 1LT and 2LT designations), and Premier (replacing the previous LTZ trim level as the top-of-the-line Cruze trim level). Discontinued are the Eco and Diesel trim levels. All trim levels is equipped with a 1.4-liter EcoTec inline-four engine. Higher trim levels (LT and Premier) also offer features such as the "RS Sport Package".

The base L only offers a six-speed manual transmission, while the Premier, on the other end of the spectrum, offers only a six-speed automatic transmission. The LS and LT trim levels offer either a six-speed manual transmission, or a six-speed automatic transmission.

A new diesel-powered Cruze became available in 2017. It uses the 1.6-liter turbo-diesel also found in the 2018 Equinox, paired to either a nine-speed automatic or six-speed manual transmission.

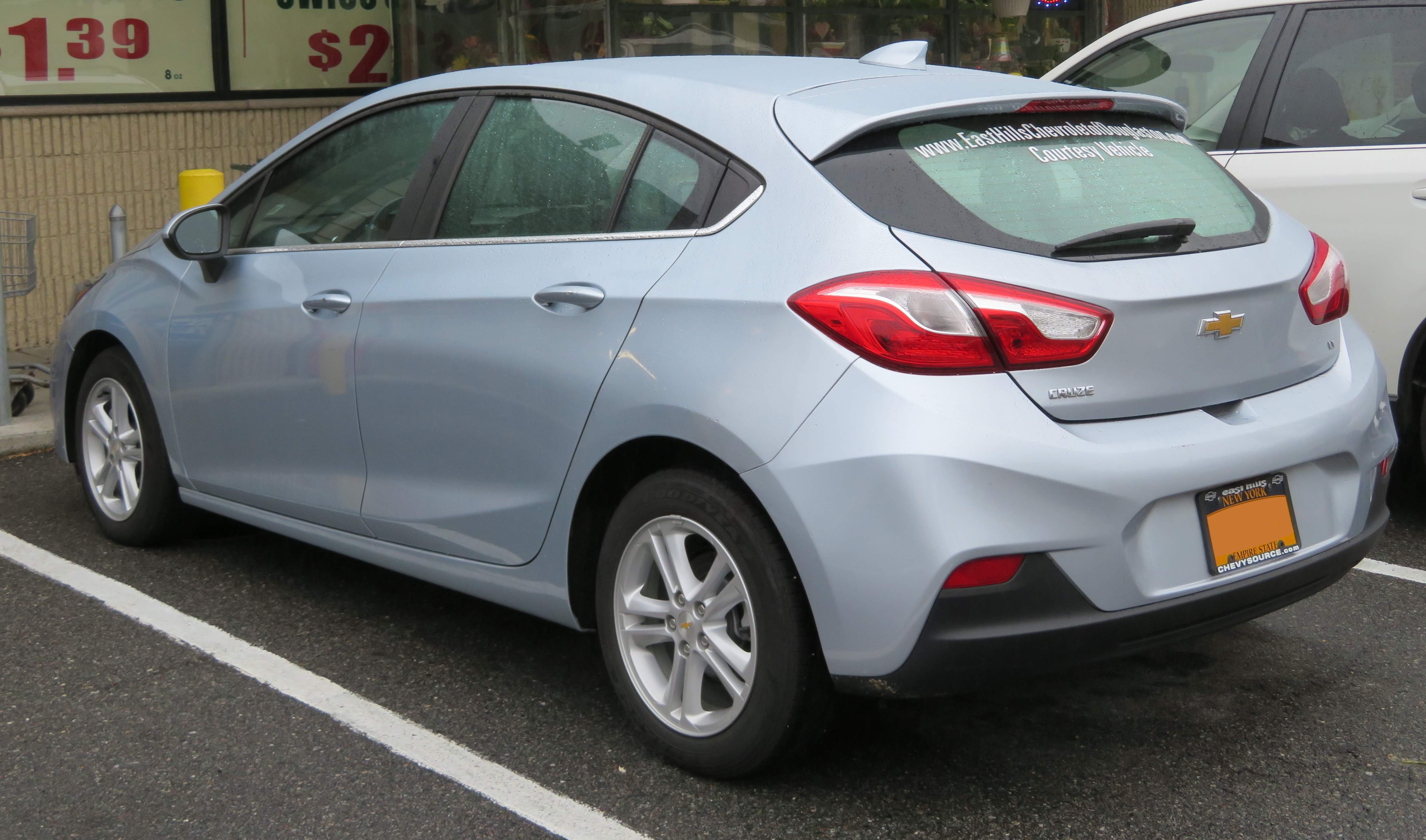
Hatchback (pre-facelift)

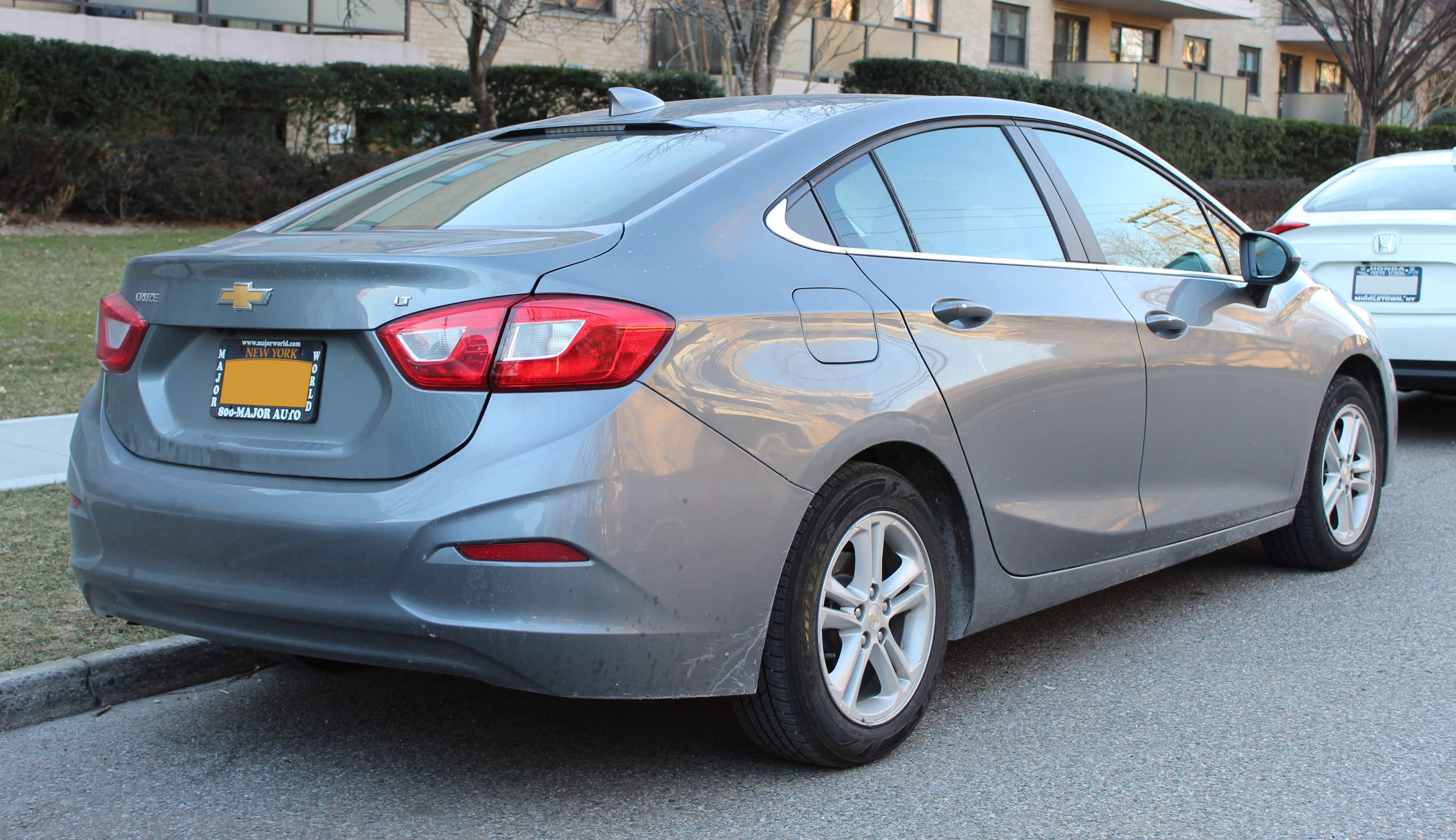
Sedan (pre-facelift)

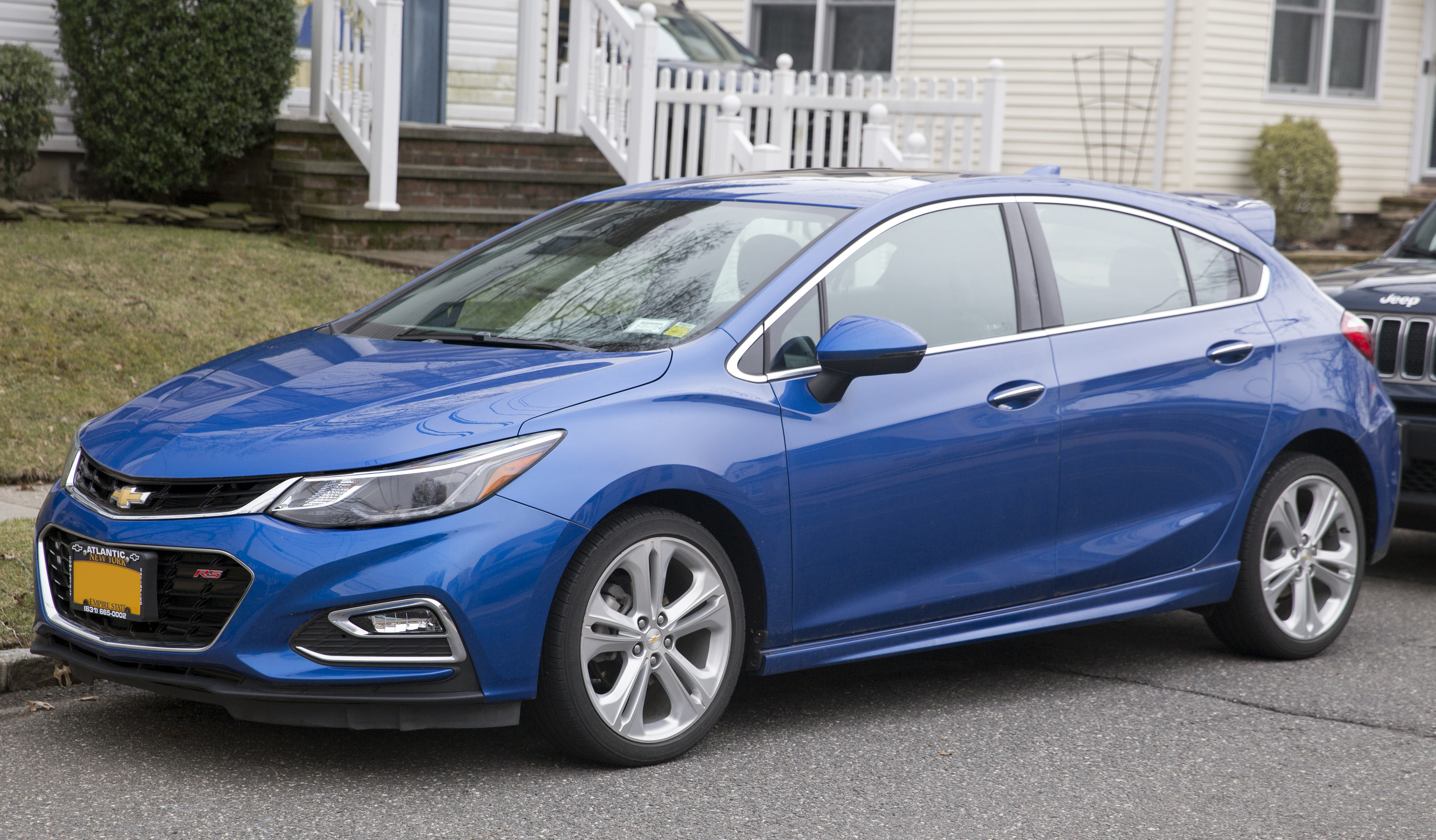
Cruze Premier RS

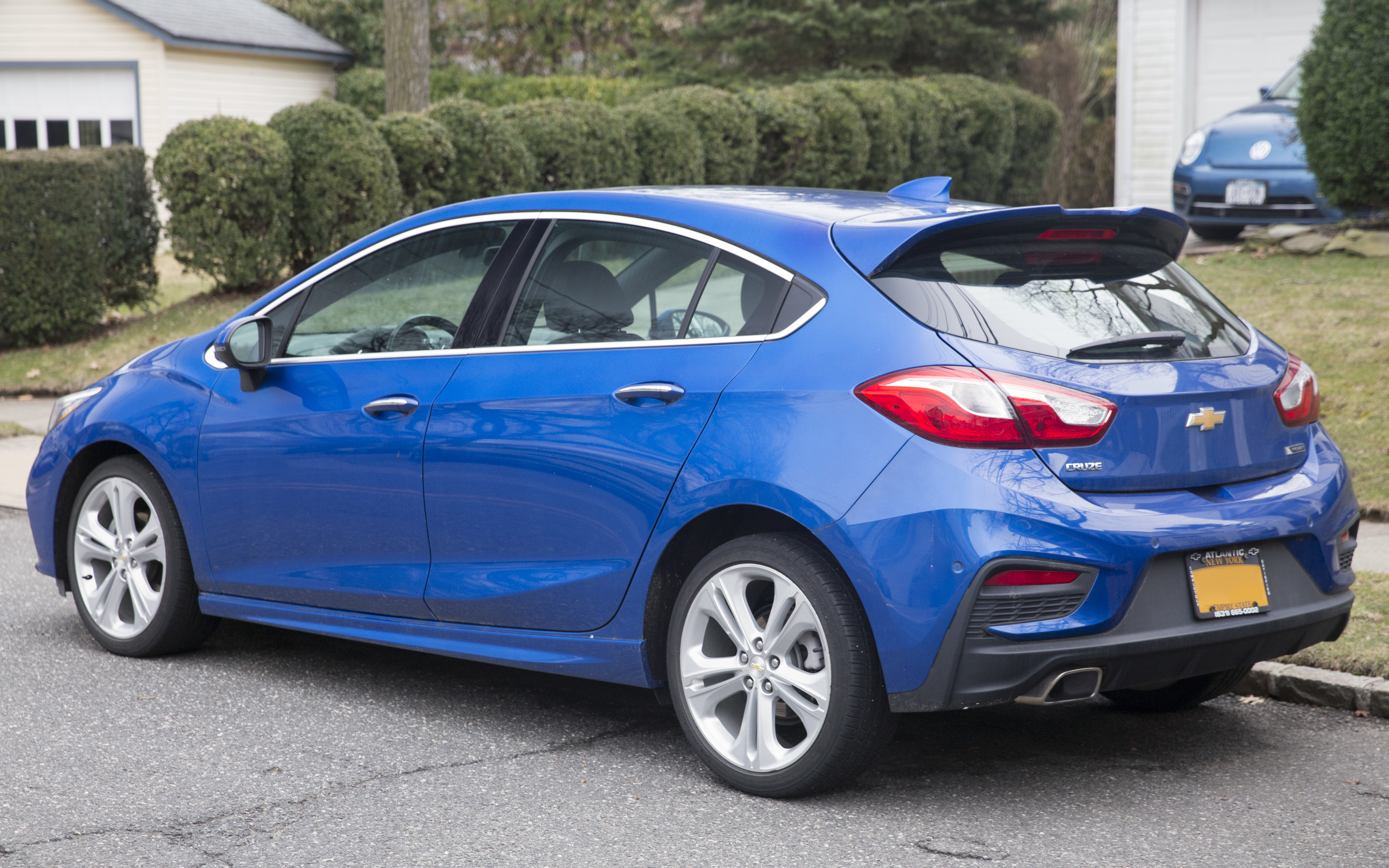
Cruze Premier RS

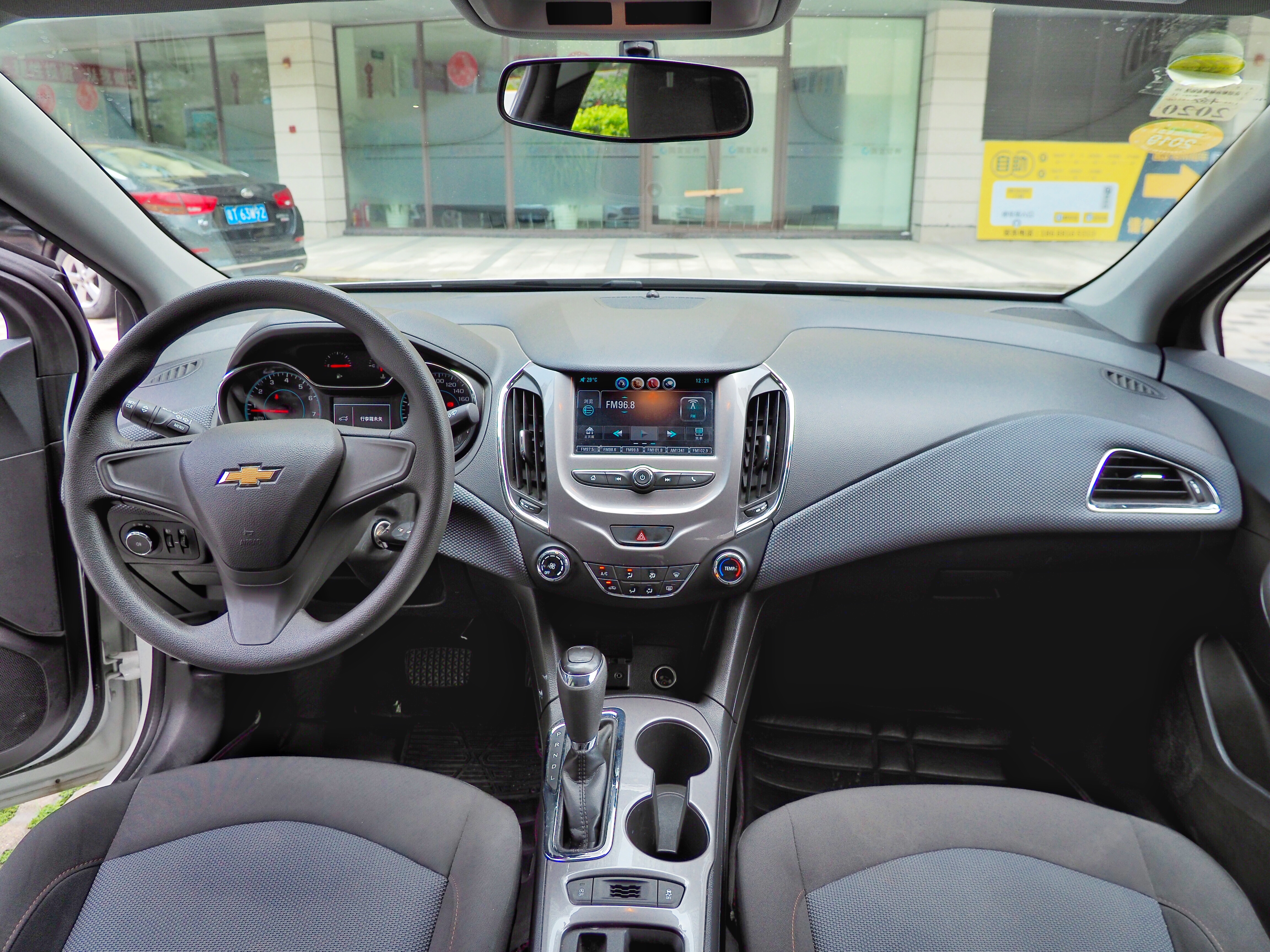
Interior

==== 2019 facelift ====
For 2019, the Cruze received a mid-cycle facelift, which made its debut in April 2018, along with restyled versions of the 2019 Camaro, Spark and Malibu. Changes for the Cruze for 2019 include the addition of a lower-priced LS model for the Cruze Hatchback, the deletion of the six-speed manual transmission option (all Cruze models, including the previous manual-only L, will come equipped with an automatic transmission), all-new third-generation MyLink Systems, and a revised RS Package for LT and Premier models. The 2019 Cruze went on sale in November 2018.

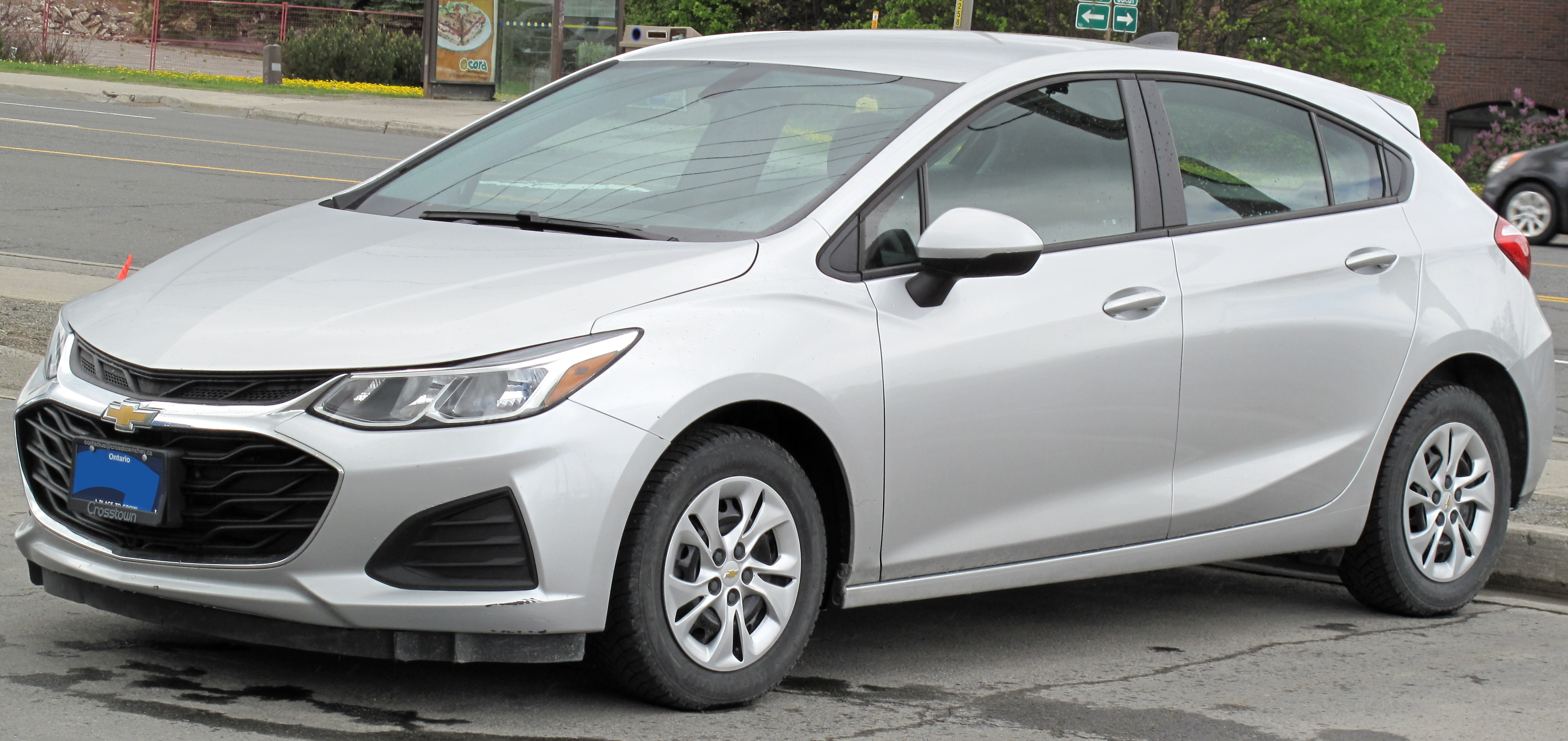
2019 Cruze LS hatchback (facelift)

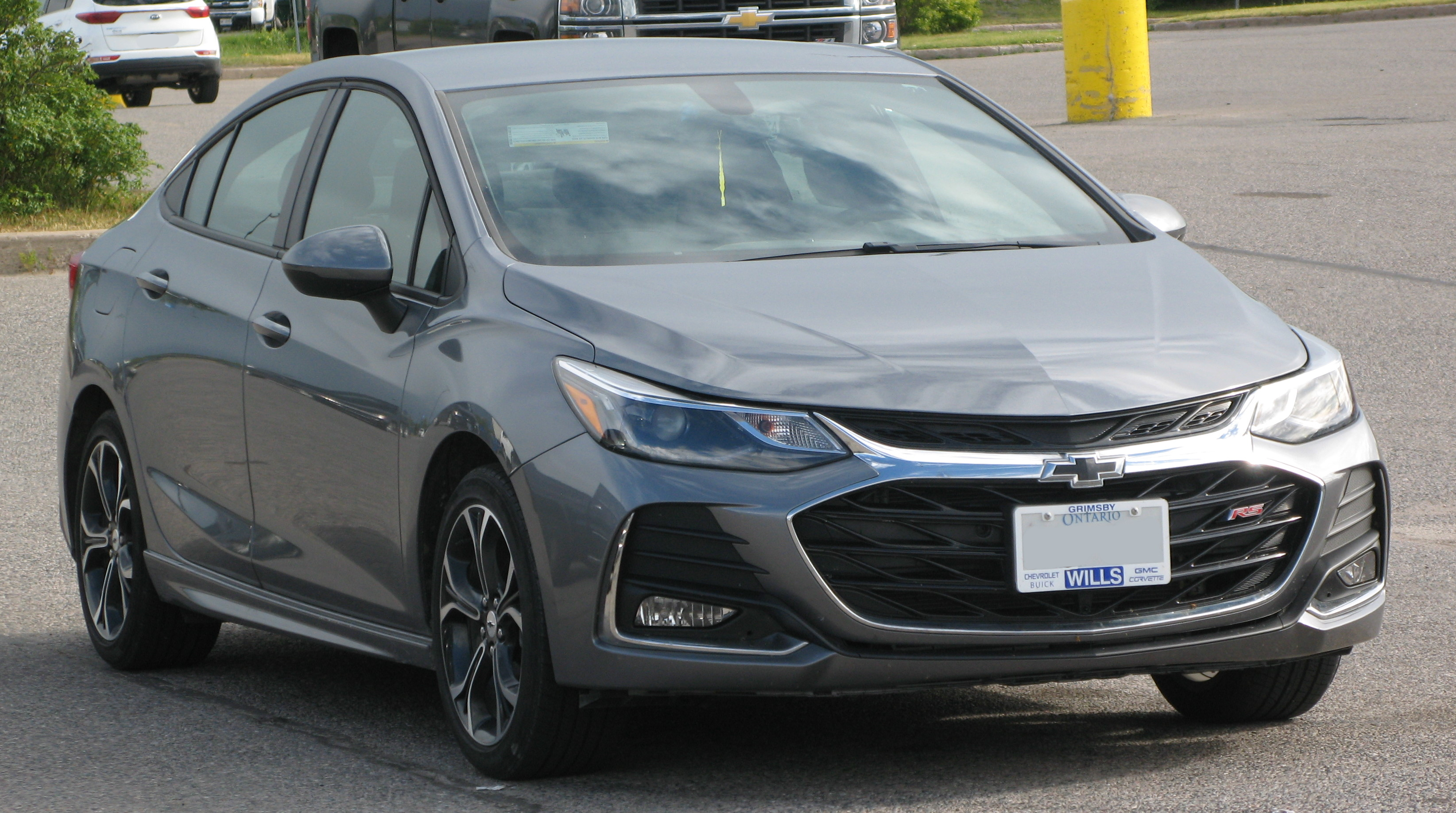
2019 Cruze LT RS sedan (facelift)

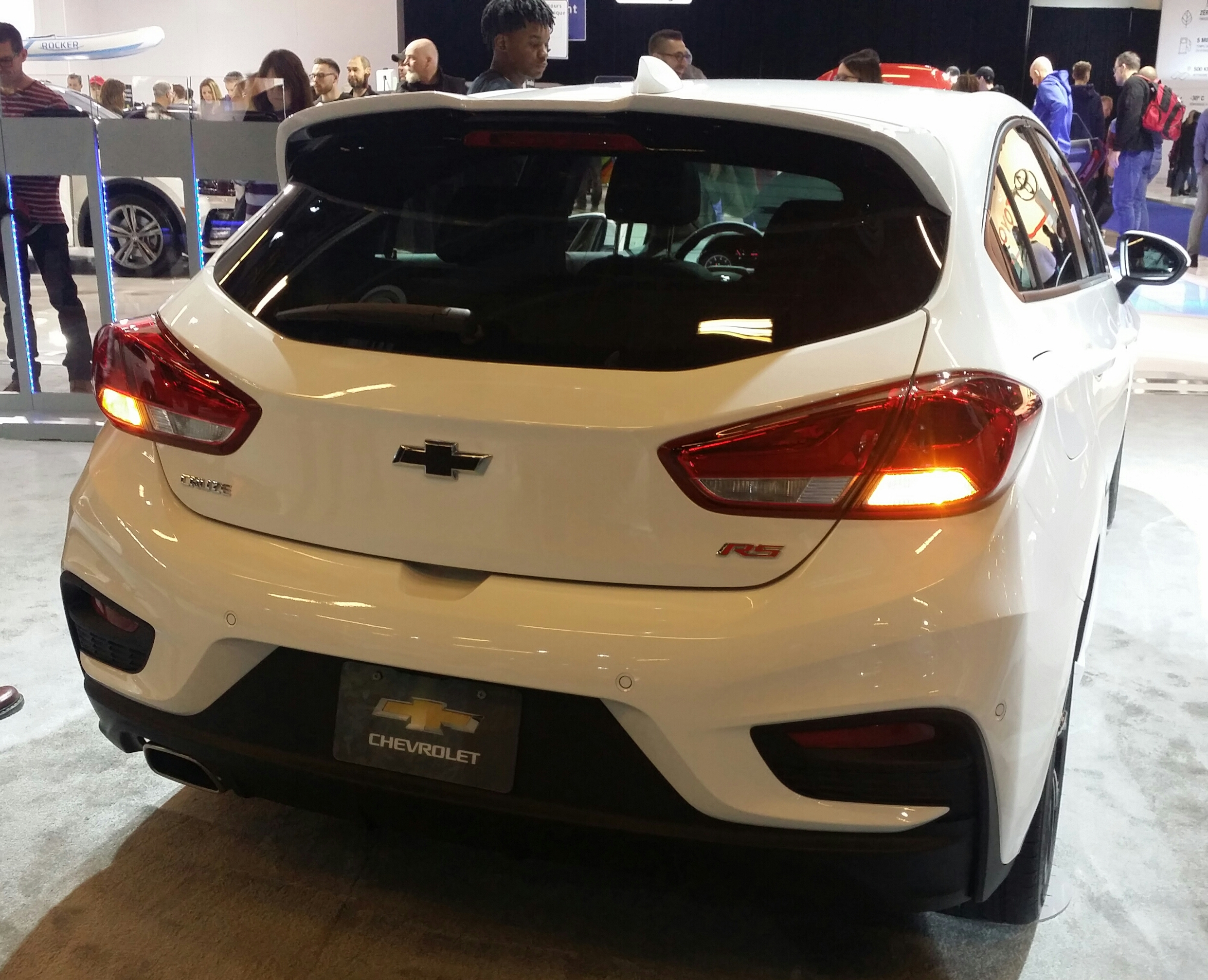
Hatchback rear three-quarter view

==== Australia ====
Before launching the Chevrolet Cruze as the Holden Astra in Australia, Holden engineers performed 100,000 kilometres of suspension and steering testing at the Lang Lang Proving Ground south east of Melbourne, Australia, tuning for Australian roads. A firmer more compliant ride and more responsive steering tune is the result. Other major changes over the international model included revised front and rear bumpers, which aim to give it a similar look to the Holden Astra Hatch.

Unlike the hatchback version, the sedan was offered in LS, LS+, LT and LTZ trim levels. All models are powered by a 1.4 L (1,399 cc) turbocharged direct injection engine with a power of 110 kW (150 hp) at 5,600 rpm and torque of 235 N⋅m (173 lb⋅ft) at 1,600–4,000 rpm mated to a 6-speed manual or 6-speed automatic.

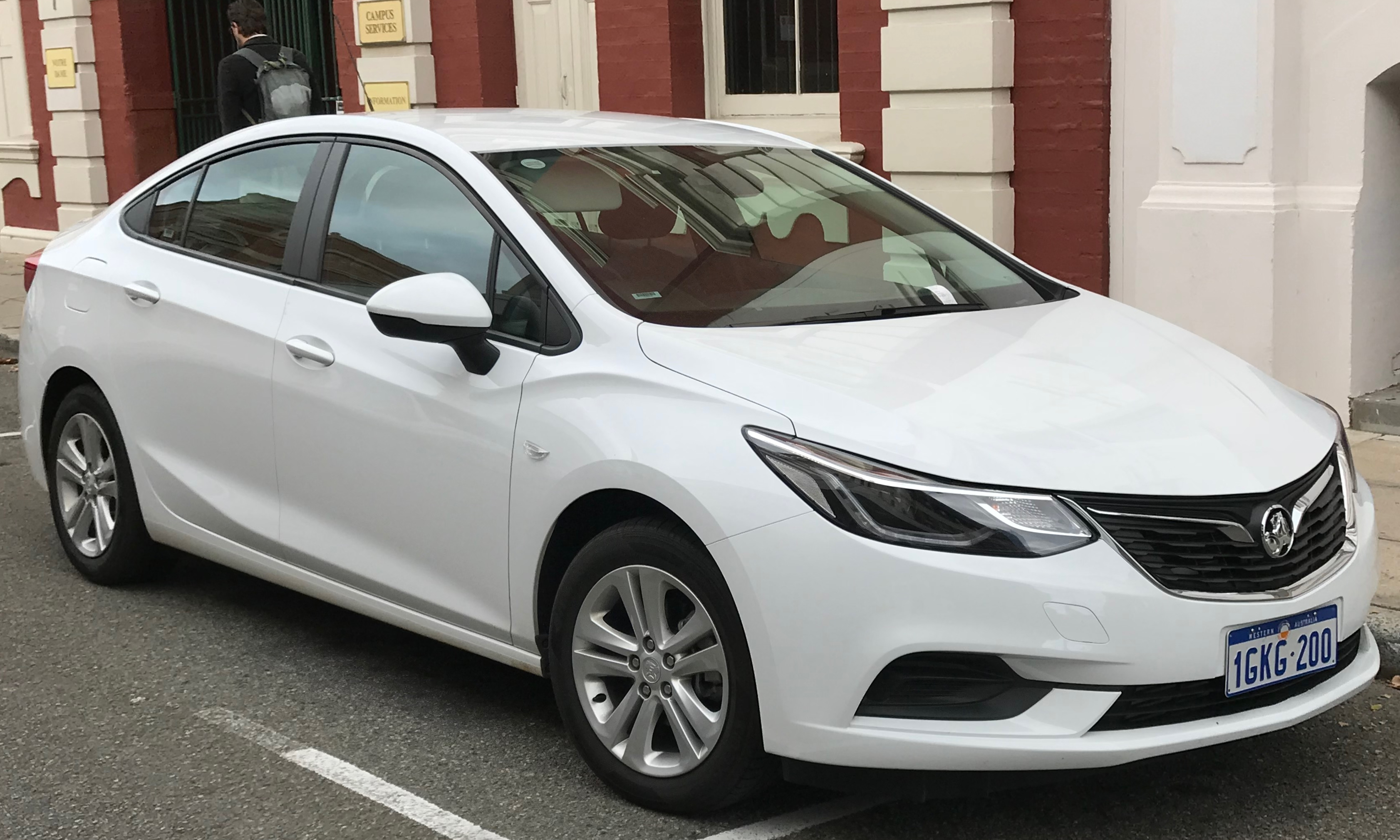
Holden Astra Sedan

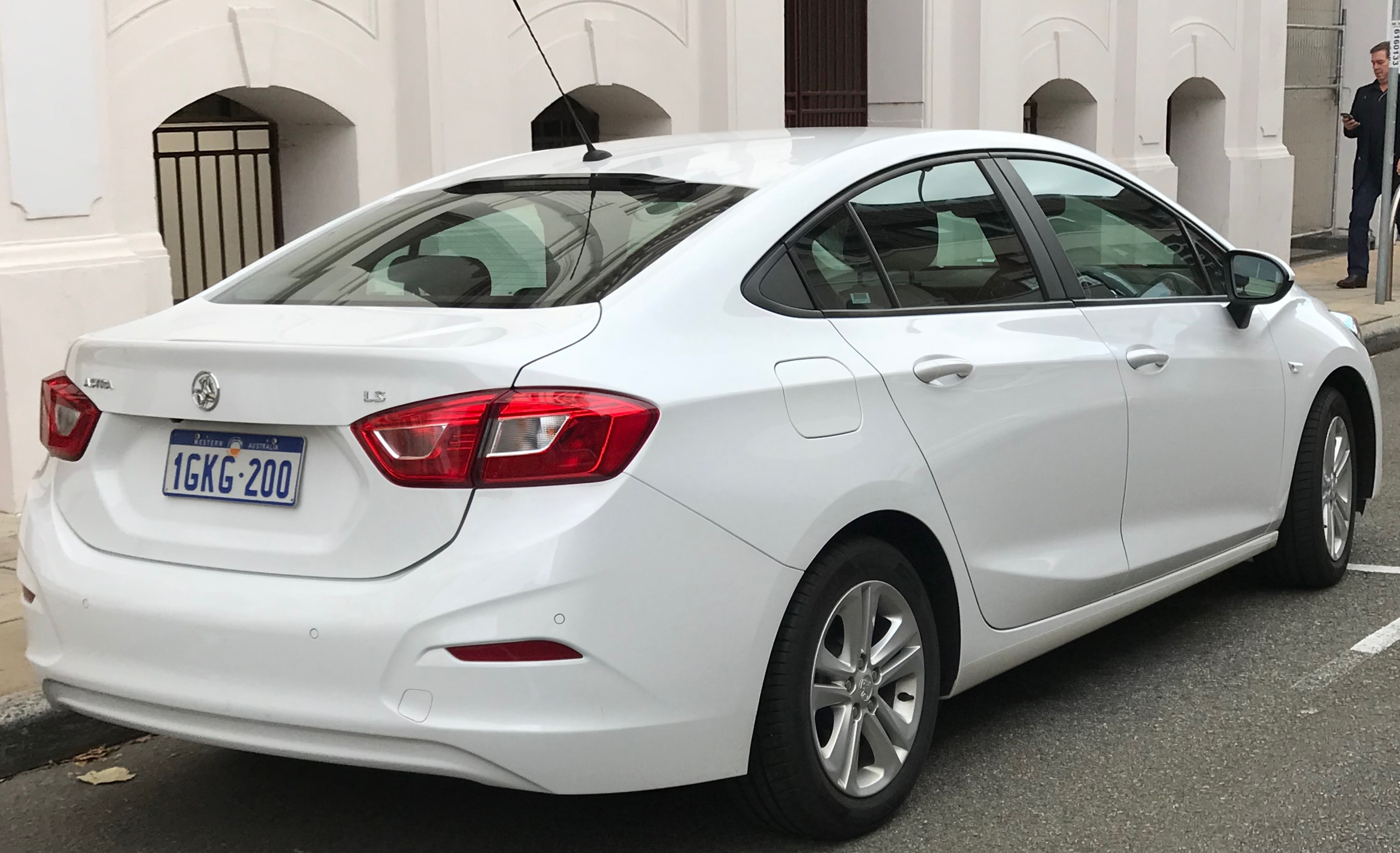
Rear view

==== Safety ====
===== Latin NCAP =====
The Cruze in its most basic Latin American market configuration with four airbags and ESC received four stars for adult occupants and four stars for infants from Latin NCAP 2.0 in 2018.

Latin NCAP 2.0 test results Chevrolet Cruze + 4 Airbags (2018, based on Euro NCAP 2008)
Test	Points	Stars
Adult occupant:	30.23/34.0	4 /5 stars
Child occupant:	38.75/49.00	4 /5 stars

A further improved Cruze in its most basic Latin American market configuration with six airbags and ESC received five stars for adult occupants and four stars for infants from Latin NCAP 2.0 in 2019.

Latin NCAP 2.0 test results Chevrolet Cruze + 6 Airbags (from 21/05/2019) (2019, based on Euro NCAP 2008)
Test	Points	Stars
Adult occupant:	30.23/34.0	5 /5 stars
Child occupant:	39.83/49.00	4 /5 stars

===== IIHS =====
The 2019 Cruze was tested by the IIHS:

IIHS scores
Moderate overlap front	Good	
Side (original test)	Good	
Front crash prevention (Vehicle-to-Vehicle)	Basic	optional
Child seat anchors (LATCH) ease of use	Marginal	

=== Chinese version (2014–2016, D2SC) ===
Second generation (D2SC)
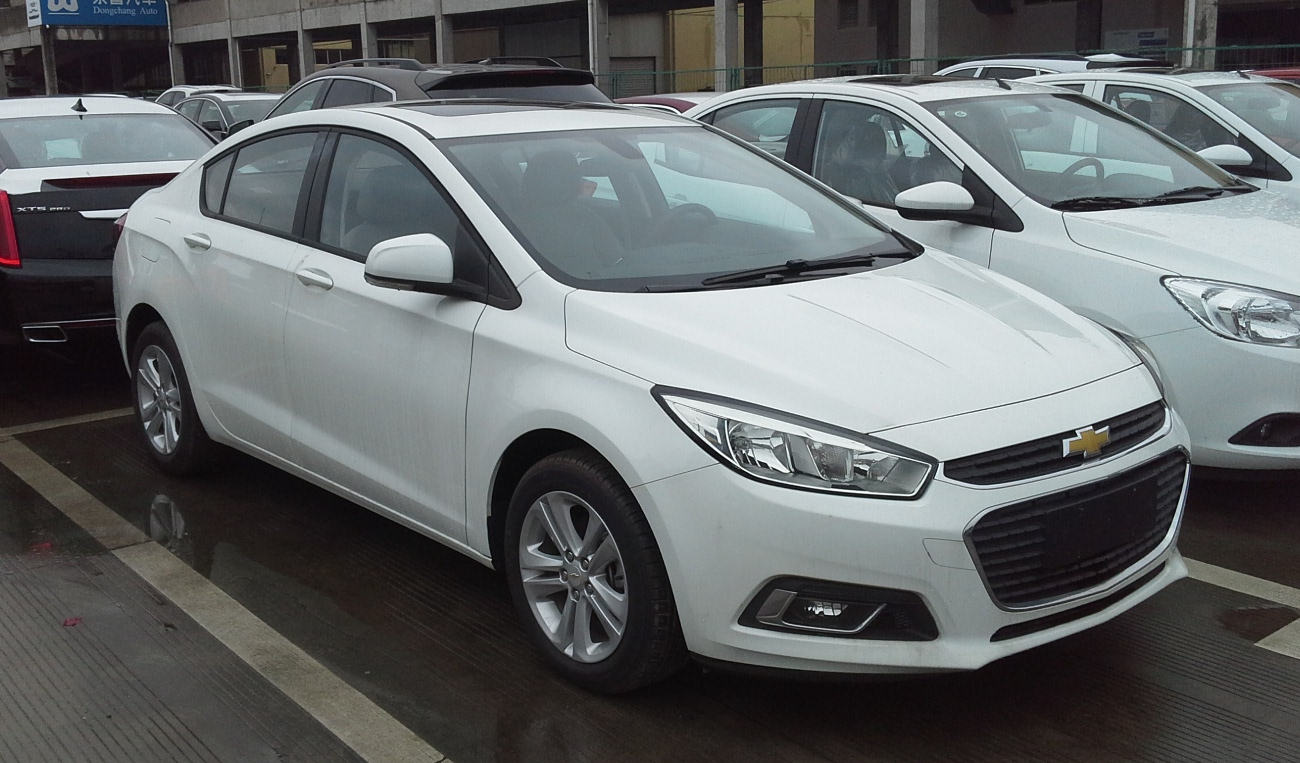

Overview
- Production: 2014–2016
- Assembly: China: Shenyang, Liaoning (SAIC-GM)

Body and chassis
- Body style: 4-door sedan
- Platform: D2XX platform

Powertrain
- Engine: Gasoline: 1.5 L SGE I4
- Transmission: 6-speed M32 manual; 7-speed DCG DCT

Dimensions
- Wheelbase: 2,662 mm (104.8 in)
- Length: 4,567 mm (179.8 in)
- Width: 1,786 mm (70.3 in)
- Height: 1,455 mm (57.3 in)
- Curb weight: 1,195–1,300 kg (2,634.5–2,866.0 lb)

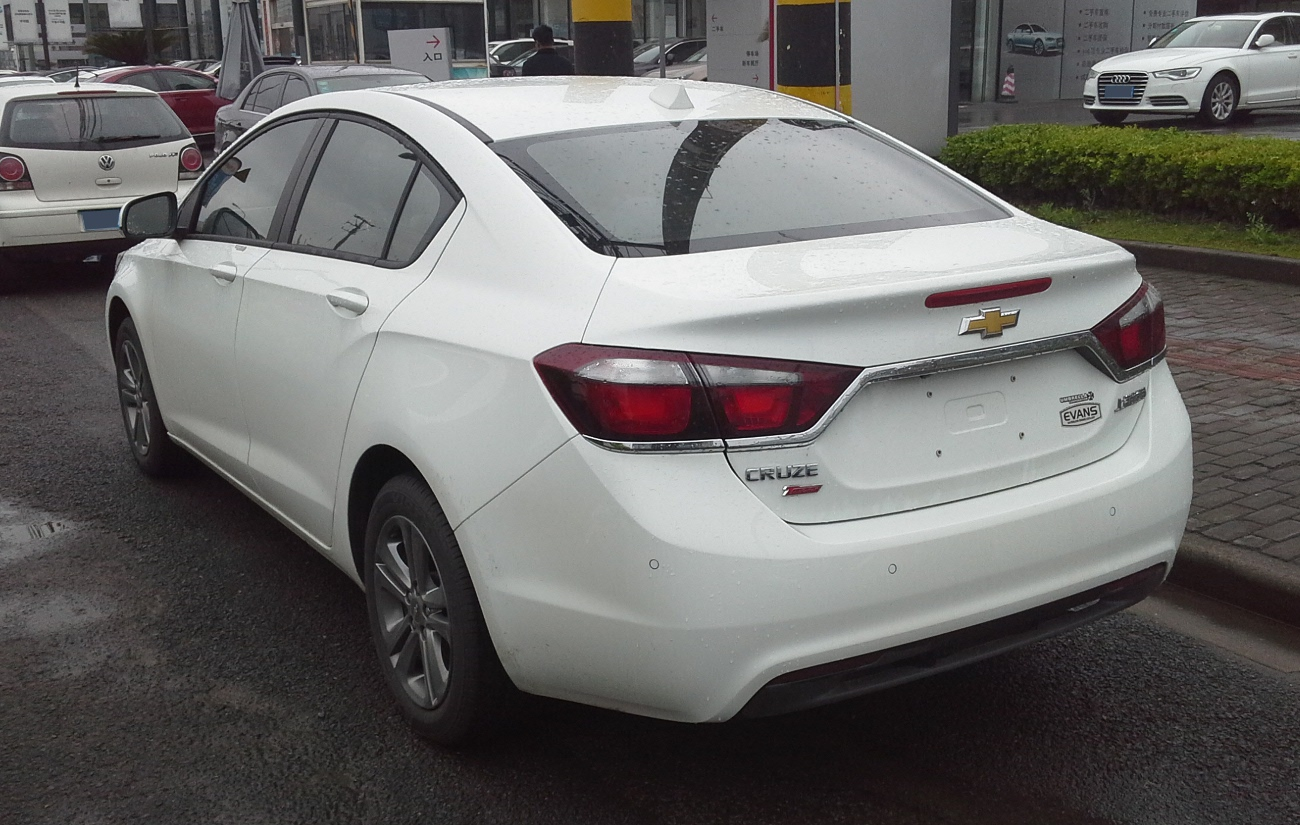
Rear view

The new model was first announced for the Chinese market at the 2014 Beijing Auto Show and went on sale in August 2014. Based on the D2XX platform and designed by SAIC-GM, the Cruze J400 CN only sold for two years before the release of the international Cruze J400.

The four-door sedan has a fastback-like sloping roofline and a low drag coefficient of 0.28 comes with a choice of a 1.4 L (1,399 cc) turbocharged direct injection engine with a power of 110 kW (150 hp) at 5,600 rpm and torque of 235 N⋅m (173 lb⋅ft) at 1,600–4,000 rpm, which can be mated with a six-speed manual transmission or seven-speed Start/Stop enabled dual-clutch gearbox, or a 1.5 L (1,490 cc) direct injection engine with a power of 84 kW (113 hp) at 5,600 rpm and torque of 146 N⋅m (108 lb⋅ft) at 6,000 rpm mated to a six-speed Start/Stop-capable automatic transmission. Both engines come from the new GM Small Gasoline Engine family. Weight reduction of 10% is achieved by using very high-strength steels and aluminum alloys. Watt's link torsion beam rear suspension, first used on the Opel Astra (J), comes as standard. The car comes equipped with a 4.2" color screen radio or MyLink 2.0 infotainment system with an 8" screen, and can be configured with OnStar Gen10 offering 4G LTE Internet connection with a built-in Wi-Fi hotspot.

Mules of the Chinese version of the Cruze were spied in the United States with a different front fascia.

== Discontinuation ==
Production of the D2LC-K Cruze ended in South Korea in July 2018, and in the US and Mexico in March 2019. The Lordstown assembly plant was closed and sold to Lordstown Motors, while Ramos Arizpe Assembly will build the Chevrolet Blazer instead.

Assembly of the Chevrolet Cruze Sedan at Lordstown Assembly in Lordstown, Ohio concluded on Wednesday, March 6, 2019, when the last car rolled off of the assembly line. Assembly plant workers at the plant wrote inspiring messages on the unfinished body underneath the paint, as well as signed one of the foam front seat cushions underneath the upholstery. GM turned down an offer from Cleveland automotive dealer owner Bernie Moreno to keep the plant open and continue building the Cruze under a five-year deal, which he hoped would be used to launch a ridesharing service featuring a fleet of Cruzes with two shifts under Moreno's direction.

Production in China ended in February 2020, following stronger sales of the Chevrolet Monza in that market. This leaves Argentina as the sole remaining producer of the Cruze, for the Latin American market. In 2016, this plant was the subject of three one-hour episodes of Mega Fábricas from Nat Geo. US$740 million were invested in this factory to produce the Cruze, including 250 to make its engine. Flex-fuel engines are exported to Brazil and CNG versions used to be exported to the UK, where a plant producing Opel/Vauxhall (sold since to PSA) is located. The Cruze is the only C-segment hatchback/sedan made in Argentina. In 2021, the unit number 150,000 was produced there.

Unlike its Chevrolet predecessors for the U.S. market—Cavalier, Prizm, and Cobalt—or its Daewoo predecessors for the South Korean market—Espero, Nexia, Nubira, and Lacetti—the Cruze has been discontinued without any announcement or plans for a replacement. The second-generation Cruze "was not [considered] a particularly standout product in an extremely competitive segment" against similar offerings from well-established and highly-attractive rivals from Japan, and South Korea such as the Honda Civic, the Toyota Corolla, and the Hyundai Elantra.

At the end of 29 December 2023, production in Argentina was discontinued as well.

== Motorsport ==
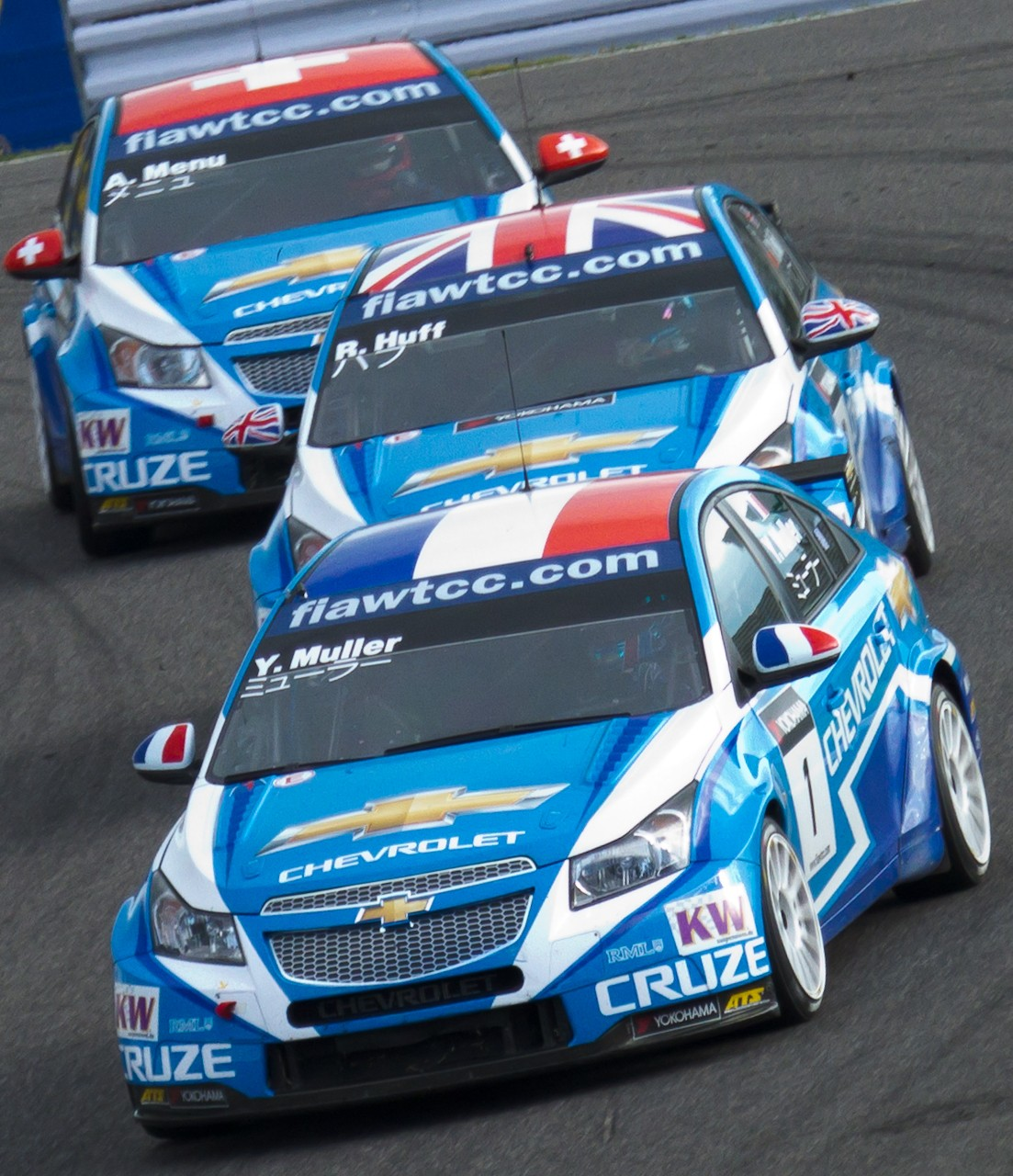
The three works Chevrolet Cruze touring cars competing in the 2011 World Touring Car Championship

The Chevrolet Cruze first entered the World Touring Car Championship in 2009 with a 2.0-litre naturally aspirated engine, taking six wins in its debut season. Chevrolet won the manufacturers' championship in 2010 and again in 2011 using the new 1.6-litre turbocharged engine. Yvan Muller took the drivers' title in both seasons, while the latter saw Chevrolet drivers place first, second and third, with Muller finishing ahead of teammates Rob Huff and Alain Menu. Chevrolet won its third manufacturers' title in 2012, while its drivers finished 1–2–3 again, this time, Huff becoming champion ahead of Menu and Muller.

The Cruze also entered the British Touring Car Championship for 2010 and 2011. Jason Plato won the drivers' championship with Chevrolet in 2010 and finished third in 2011. The BTCC Cruze used the 2.0-liter naturally aspirated engine found in the original variant of the WTCC Cruze.

The Cruze won the Scandinavian Touring Car Championship in 2011, being run by NIKA Racing under the banner of 'Chevrolet Motorsport Sweden' with Rickard Rydell driving. Rydell and teammate Michel Nykjær finished second and third in 2012.

At the end of 2011, Chevrolet pulled their factory support from the BTCC to support the Chevrolet team in the World Touring Car Championship for 2012. Chevrolet then announced they would not enter a works team for the 2013 WTCC season. For 2013 RML, the original builders of the Cruzes, continued to compete without the support of Chevrolet. Cars were also entered by Bamboo Engineering, NIKA Racing and Tuenti Racing Team. Despite no funding from the manufacturer, the Cruze remained competitive, even against works teams from newcomers Honda and Lada. Muller won his fourth WTCC drivers' title and James Nash won the Yokohama Drivers' Trophy for independent entries, ahead of fellow Cruze drivers Alex MacDowall and Michel Nykjær.

RML continued to build Cruzes to the new TC1 WTCC regulations for 2014, which saw the cars increase in power and feature greater aerodynamics. RML aimed to build up to six cars. Recipients included ROAL Motorsport, whose driver lineup included Tom Chilton; Bamboo Engineering, who ran two cars; and Campos Racing, who entered a car for Hugo Valente.

The Cruze returned to the BTCC in 2013 in the hands of Joe Girling and Tech-Speed Motorsport, who loaned the car from Finesse Motorsport. The increase in performance of the Next Generation Touring Car entries meant the older Super 2000 specification cars like the Cruze became too uncompetitive to compete for wins but were provided with their own category. Ir was powered by a 2.0-litre turbocharged NGTC-specification engine, Girling took one class win at Donington Park but missed the second half of the season. The car returned to Finesse Motorsport who entered the Knockhill round of the championship with Aiden Moffat driving. At sixteen years old, Moffat became the BTCC's youngest driver at 16 years, 10 months and 28 days. This was to be the S2000 Cruze's final appearance in the BTCC, as S2000 cars are to be abolished from 2014. Andy Neate entered the 2013 season with a new NGTC-specification Cruze, built by his own team, IP Tech Race Engineering and used an engine built by RML. The car made its debut at Snetterton and competed at several rounds towards the end of the season. The car has since been sold to Aiden Moffat, who will run the car with his own team for 2014. BTC Racing will enter a hatchback variant of the Cruze for 2014, driven by Chris Stockton. The car was originally intended to be used by Jason Plato in 2012 but RML and Chevrolet withdrew from the BTCC and mothballed the shell. BTC Racing acquired it and were initially included on the entry list for 2013 but the car was not finished in time and never appeared all season.

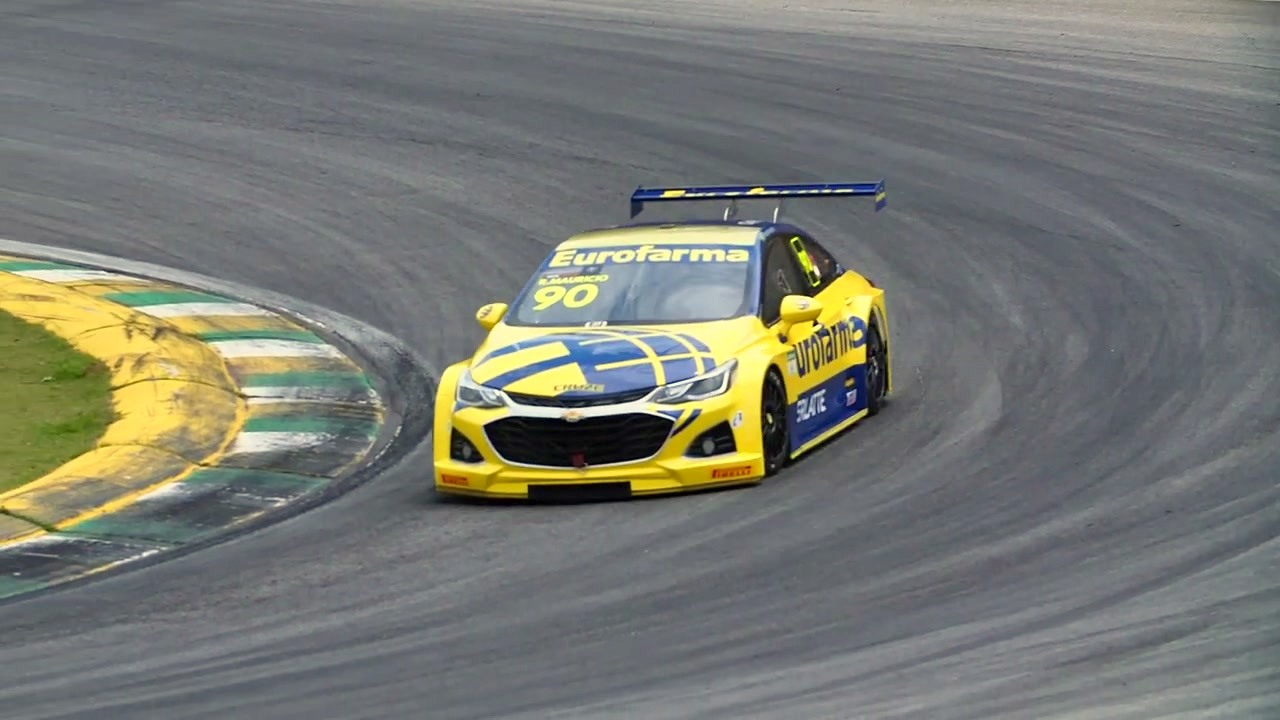
Chevrolet Cruze in the 2021 Stock Car Championship

The first-generation Chevrolet Cruze debuted in the Argentine TC 2000 in 2011, and the second-generation in 2016. Agustín Canapino won the 2016 and 2021 championships. The second-generation Cruze is also entered in Turismo Nacional, where Jonatan Castellano took the Class 3 title in 2022.

The second generation of the Chevrolet Cruze made its debut at Stock Car Brasil in 2016 with tubular chassis and in 2020 the fiber fairing gives way to the original bodywork of the cars with the necessary changes for the adaptation.

== Sales ==
By country

Year	Australia	China	United States	Brazil	Europe	Thailand	Mexico
2009	12,590	92,190			18,206		2,878
2010	28,334	187,737	24,495		37,355		10,919
2011	33,784	221,196	231,732	9,402	37,661		10,838
2012	29,161	232,592	237,758	52,696	35,764		11,172
2013	24,421	246,890	248,224	48,995	34,361		9,227
2014	18,554	265,993	273,060	41,557	7,406	1,725	7,870
2015		246,088	226,602	20,601	149	595	6,594
2016		189,106	188,876	15,653	21	271	8,145
2017		82,836	184,751	26,523	16	187	6,349
2018		46,531	142,617	25,366	6	13	2,753
2019		10,538	47,975	23,154			260
2020			784	11,984			
2021				8,823			
2022				9,917			
2023				1,710			
2024				938			

Top markets

In August 2014, Cruze sales reached the milestone of 3 million units sold worldwide, 16 months after passing the 2 million mark. The following table shows the top selling markets as of August 2014.

Top 10 markets for the Cruze as of August 2014
Ranking	Country	Cumulative sales	% Global sales	Ranking	Country	Cumulative sales	% Global sales
1	China	1,130,000	37.7	6	South Korea	73,000	2.4
2	United States	900,000	30.0	7	Mexico	50,000	1.7
3	Russia	195,000	6.5	8	Turkey	30,000	1.0
4	Brazil	134,000	4.5	9	India	28,000	0.9
5	Canada	123,000	4.1	10	South Africa	27,000	0.9

By April 2016, cumulative sales of cars of the Cruze name exceeded 4 million worldwide.
