= Chevrolet Trax =

Subcompact crossover SUV

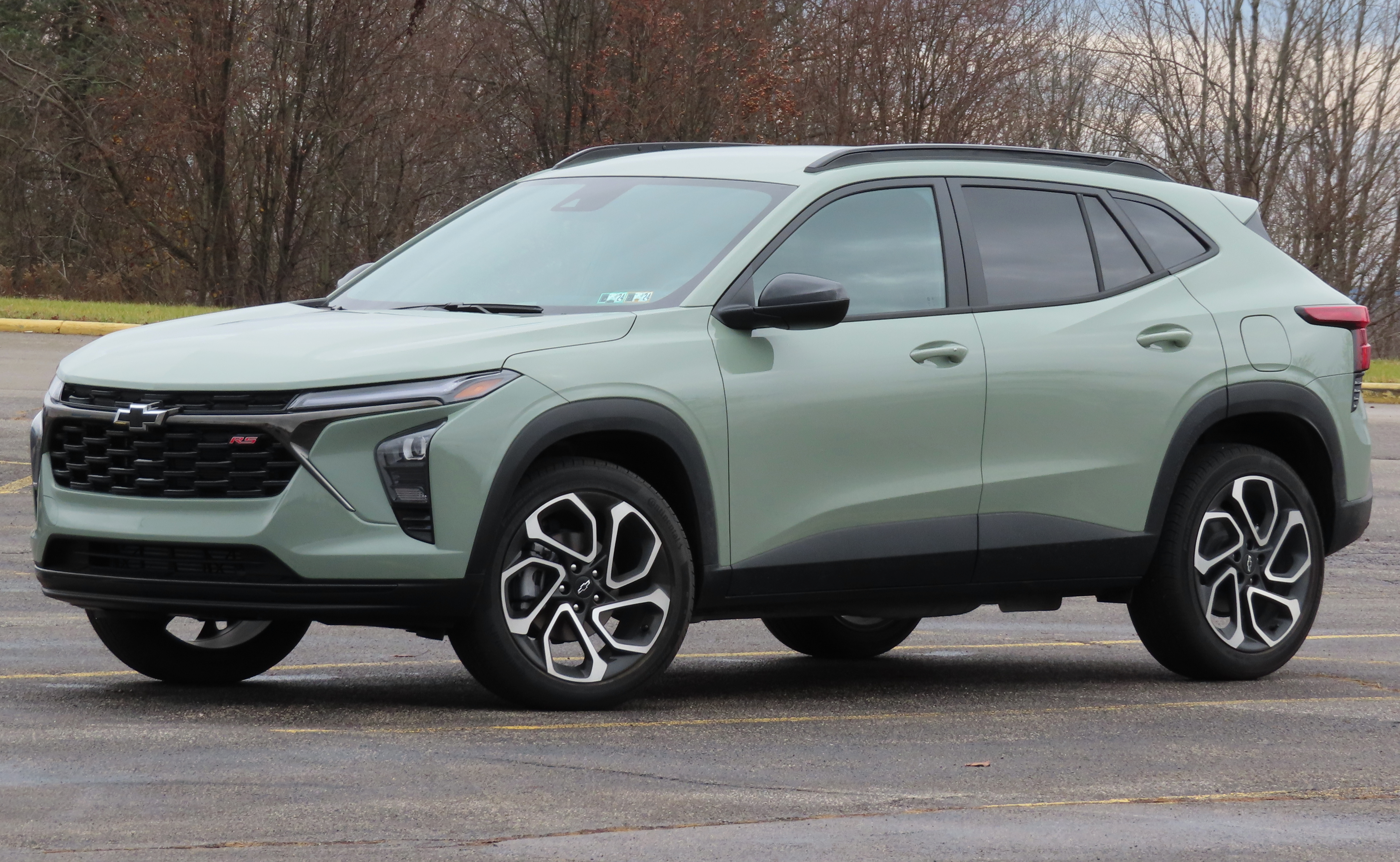

Overview
- Manufacturer: General Motors
- Also called: Holden Trax (2013–2020); Chevrolet Tracker (2013–2020); Chevrolet Seeker (2022–2025)
- Production: 2013–present

Body and chassis
- Class: Subcompact crossover SUV (B)
- Body style: 5-door SUV

Chronology
- Predecessor: Chevrolet Tracker (Americas); Chevrolet/Holden Cruze (for Suzuki Ignis rebadges, Australasia)
- Successor: Chevrolet Tracker (China, Latin America and Uzbekistan); Wuling Alvez (Indonesia)

The Chevrolet Trax is a subcompact crossover SUV manufactured by General Motors and marketed under the Chevrolet brand since 2013, currently in its second generation.

The first generation model was released globally in 2013 as the smallest, entry-level crossover SUV offering from the brand. Development and production were centered in South Korea by GM Korea. A restyled model was also produced as the Buick Encore in North America and as the Opel/Vauxhall Mokka in Europe.

In several markets, the vehicle was marketed as the Chevrolet Tracker, and as the Holden Trax in Australia and New Zealand. The Trax became available in Canada, Mexico, Germany, South Korea, Israel, Lebanon, United Arab Emirates, and Europe for the 2013 model year and was released in the United States for the 2015 model year.

In 2019, GM released the replacement of the Trax for China and Latin America, the Tracker. The first-generation Trax continued to be marketed in North America, South Korea, and several other markets until 2022, when it was replaced by the larger second-generation Trax due for the 2024 model year. The second-generation Trax is also marketed in China as the Chevrolet Seeker.

== First generation (U200; 2013) ==
First generation
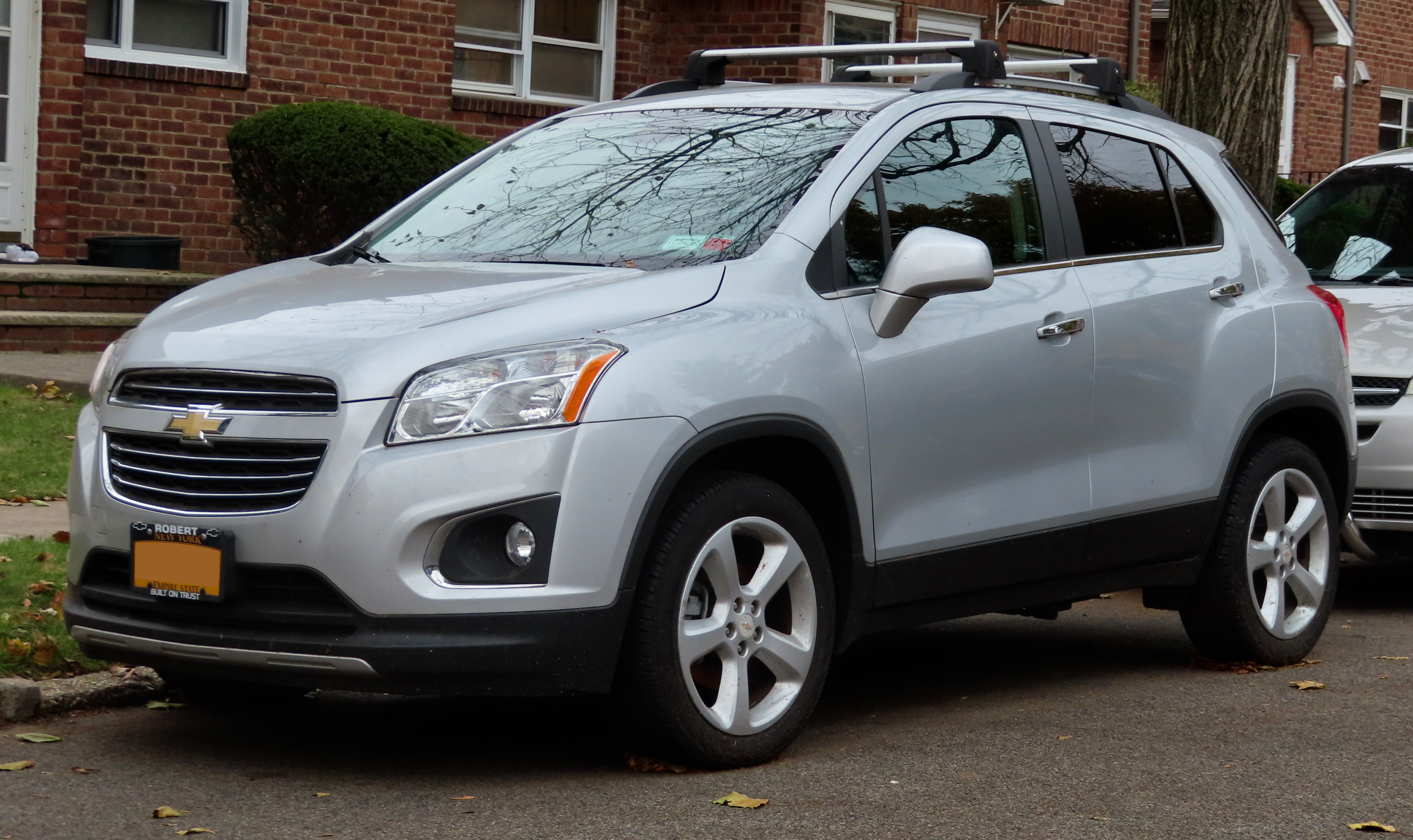

Overview
- Model code: U200; TJ (Australia)
- Also called: Holden Trax (Australasia); Chevrolet Tracker (CIS and South America)
- Production: 2013–2022; 2014–2020 (China)
- Model years: 2013–2022 (Canada, Mexico); 2015–2022 (U.S.)
- Assembly: South Korea: Bupyeong-gu, Incheon (GM Korea); Mexico: San Luis Potosí (San Luis Potosí Assembly); China: Yantai (SAIC-GM); Uzbekistan: Asaka (GM Uzbekistan)

Body and chassis
- Layout: Front-engine, front-wheel-drive; Front-engine, all-wheel-drive
- Platform: GM Gamma II
- Related: Chevrolet Aveo/Sonic; Opel Mokka/Buick Encore

Powertrain
- Engine: Gasoline: 1.4 L LE2 turbo I4; 1.4 L Family 0 turbo I4; 1.6 L Family 1 I4; 1.8 L Family 1 I4; Diesel: 1.6 L MDE I4; 1.7 L Circle L I4
- Transmission: 5-speed manual 6-speed manual 6-speed automatic

Dimensions
- Wheelbase: 2,555 mm (100.6 in)
- Length: 4,248–4,280 mm (167.2–168.5 in)
- Width: 1,766–1,775 mm (69.5–69.9 in)
- Height: 1,674 mm (65.9 in)

Chronology
- Successor: Chevrolet Tracker (China, Latin America and Uzbekistan); Opel Mokka (Europe)

The first-generation Trax (model code U200, designated TJ in Australia) was first shown as a concept car, which was first unveiled at the 2012 Paris Motor Show, with the final model unveiled at the 2013 North American International Auto Show. It was then available for test driving at the 2013 Montreal International Auto Show, with four essay models shown.

The SUV was in development since 2008 by GM's small vehicle development team centered in South Korea. It is based on the GM Gamma II platform, which is shared with the Chevrolet Aveo/Sonic and the Opel Mokka/Buick Encore. It was marketed as the Holden Trax in Australia and as the Chevrolet Tracker in Russia and South America. For most global markets, the Trax was produced by both GM Korea and GM Mexico. SAIC-GM also produced the model for the Chinese market from the 2015 model year until 2020. GM Uzbekistan also produced this model starting in late 2018.

During 2013 and early 2014, the Trax was only sold in Canada, Mexico, Germany, South Korea, Lebanon, United Arab Emirates, and Europe.

In Canada, the Trax was the first compact Chevrolet crossover SUV since the discontinuation of the Tracker (read below). The vehicle started shipping on April 2, 2013; however, pre-sales began as early as the fourth quarter of 2012 for both Mexico (1.8 L) and Canada (1.4 L turbo). Sales in South Korea started in late February 2013.

In late 2014, the Trax was marketed to more countries including China, Indonesia, and the Philippines.

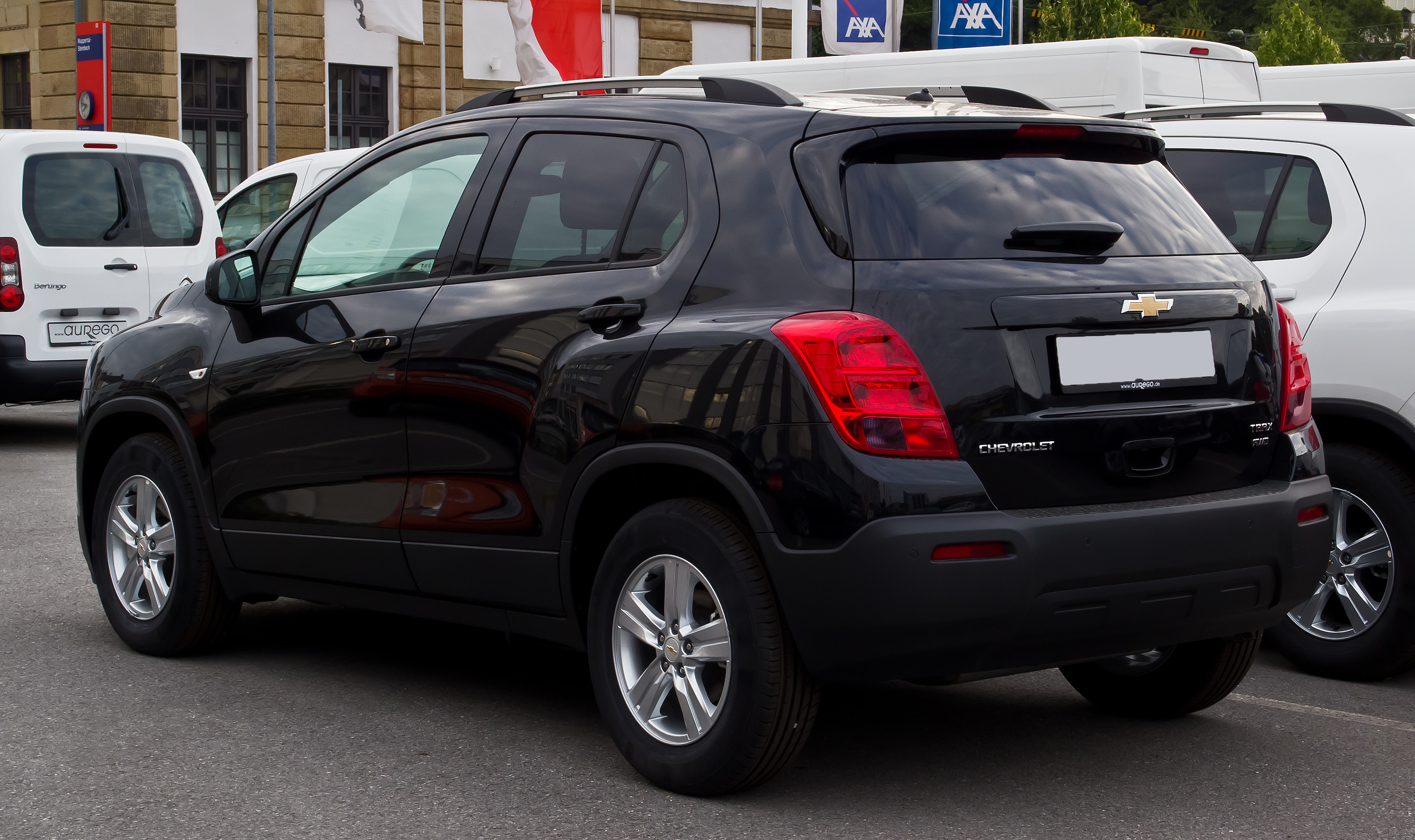
Rear view

=== Markets ===
==== South Korea ====
The Trax was introduced in South Korea in February 2013. It was powered by the 1.4 L turbocharged gasoline engine. In 2015, a 1.6-litre diesel engine was added. The facelift model was introduced in October 2016.

It was the most exported car of South Korea from 2016 to 2018.

==== United States ====
The Trax came to the United States as a 2015 model, following the success of the Buick Encore (the Trax and Encore share the GM Gamma II platform) and possible competition from the Jeep Renegade; GM initially had no plans to offer the Trax to the U.S. market. The U.S.-market Trax was largely unchanged from the global version, but had some U.S.-specific features including OnStar with AT&T 4G LTE and SiriusXM satellite radio.

The U.S. version was powered by the 1.4 L turbocharged inline-4 with 138 bhp (103 kW; 140 PS) at 4,900 rpm and 148 lb⋅ft (201 N⋅m) at 1,850 rpm. Trailer towing was not recommended. Only the 6-speed automatic transmission was available.

Three trim levels, each available with front-wheel drive and all-wheel drive, are available: LS, LT, and LTZ.

=== 2017 refresh ===
Chevrolet performed a mid-cycle update on the Trax for the 2017 model year, first unveiled at the 2016 Chicago Auto Show on February 12, 2016. The updated Trax carried design cues from the Malibu and Volt, including new halogen projector headlights, LED daytime running lights, dual taillights, and a new grille design. A set of 18-inch aluminum wheels were offered on the Premier model trim. The interior was also redesigned with a new dashboard and center instrument panel. Overall, the 2017 facelift improved Trax's perceived quality. The 2017 Trax went on sale in the fall of 2016.

The Trax continued unchanged for the 2020 model year in North America. It was joined by a slightly larger model, the Trailblazer (no relation to the previous North American or international mid-sized SUVs of the same name).

For the 2021 model year, the base L and high end Premier levels were removed from the offering trims, leaving the bottom-tier LS and now top-tier LT.

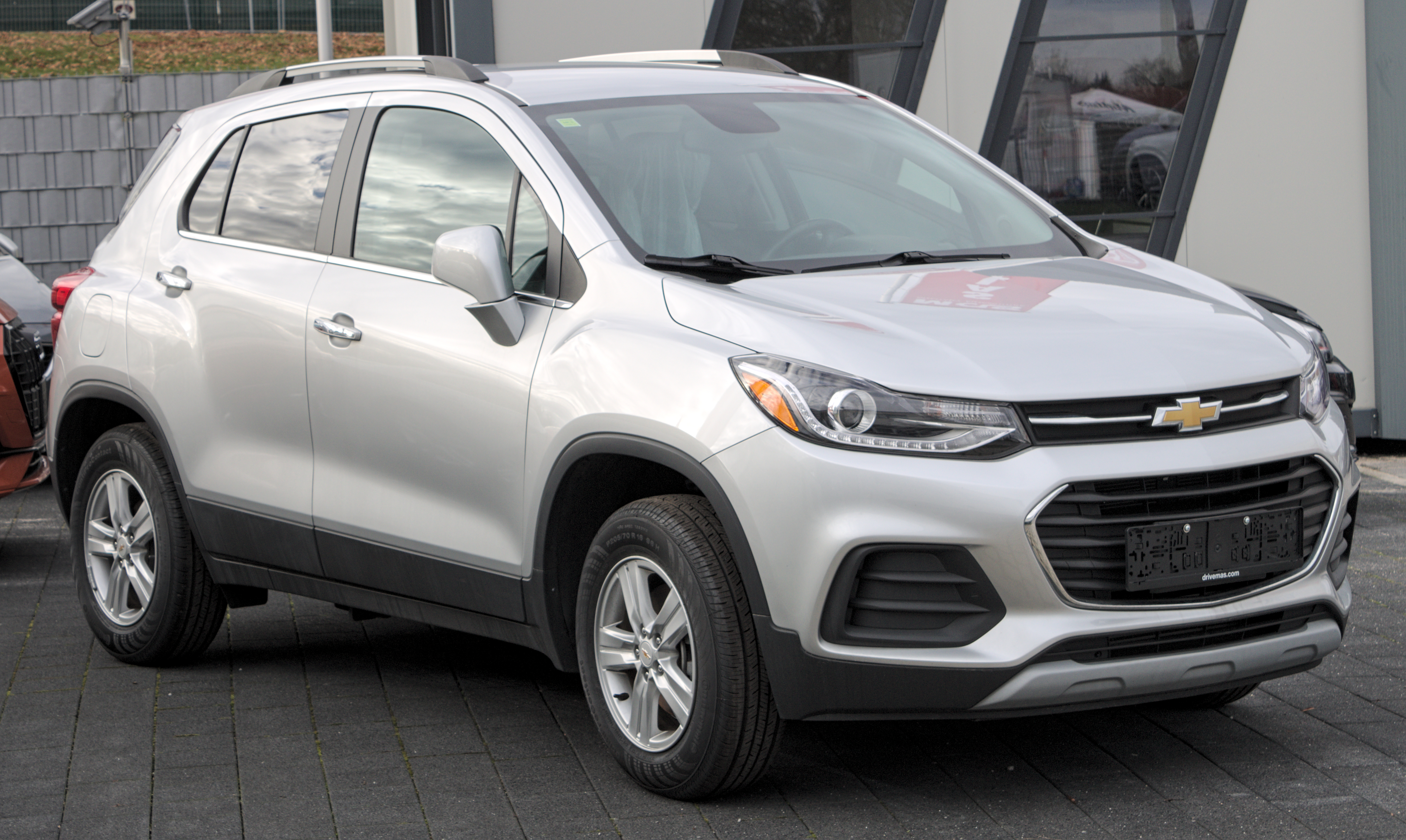
Chevrolet Trax (facelift)

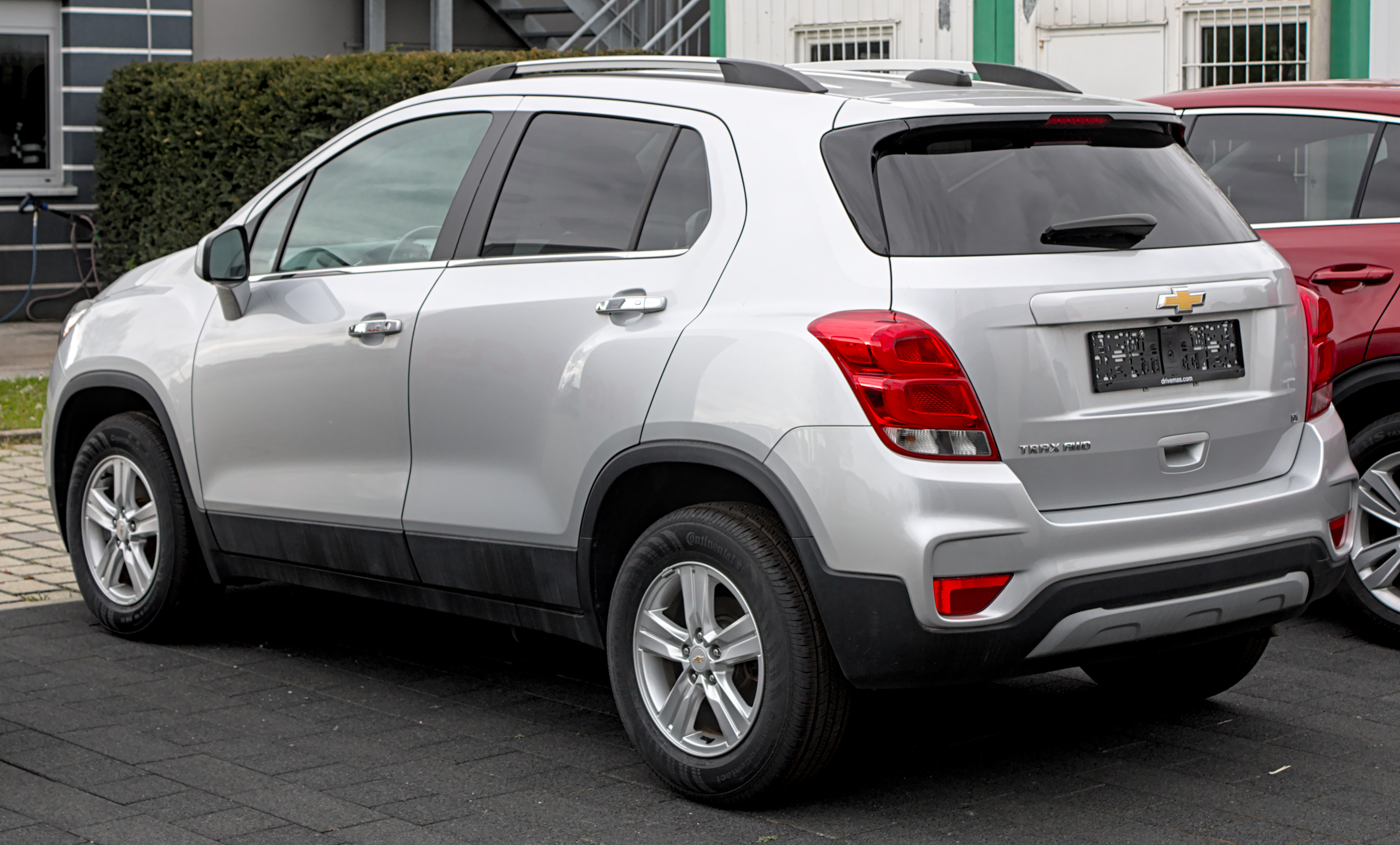
Chevrolet Trax (facelift)

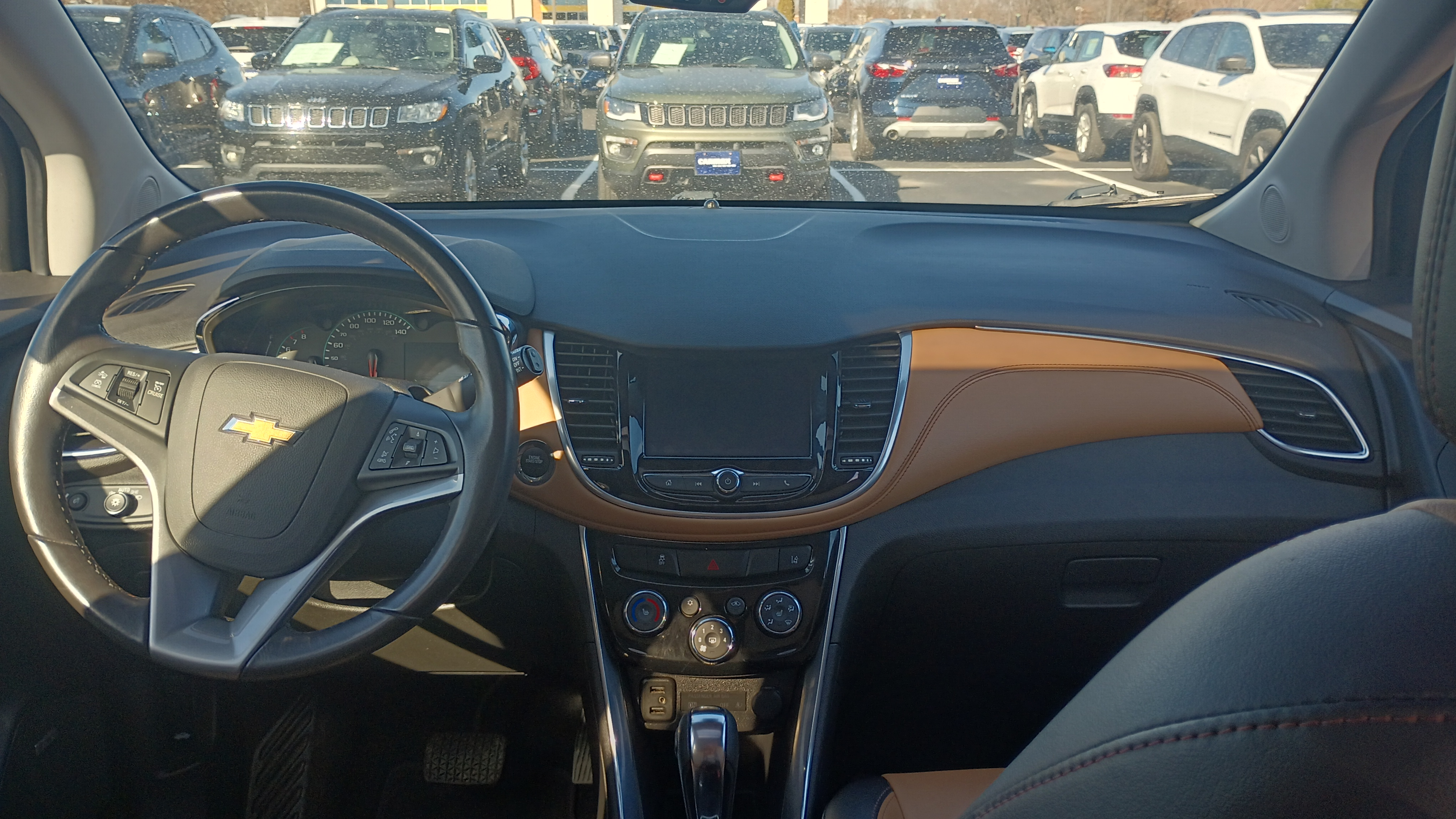
Interior

=== Regional variants ===
==== Holden Trax (2013–2020) ====
In Australia and other Oceania markets, the Chevrolet Trax was offered under the Holden brand until that brand was discontinued in 2020. It went on sale in 2013.

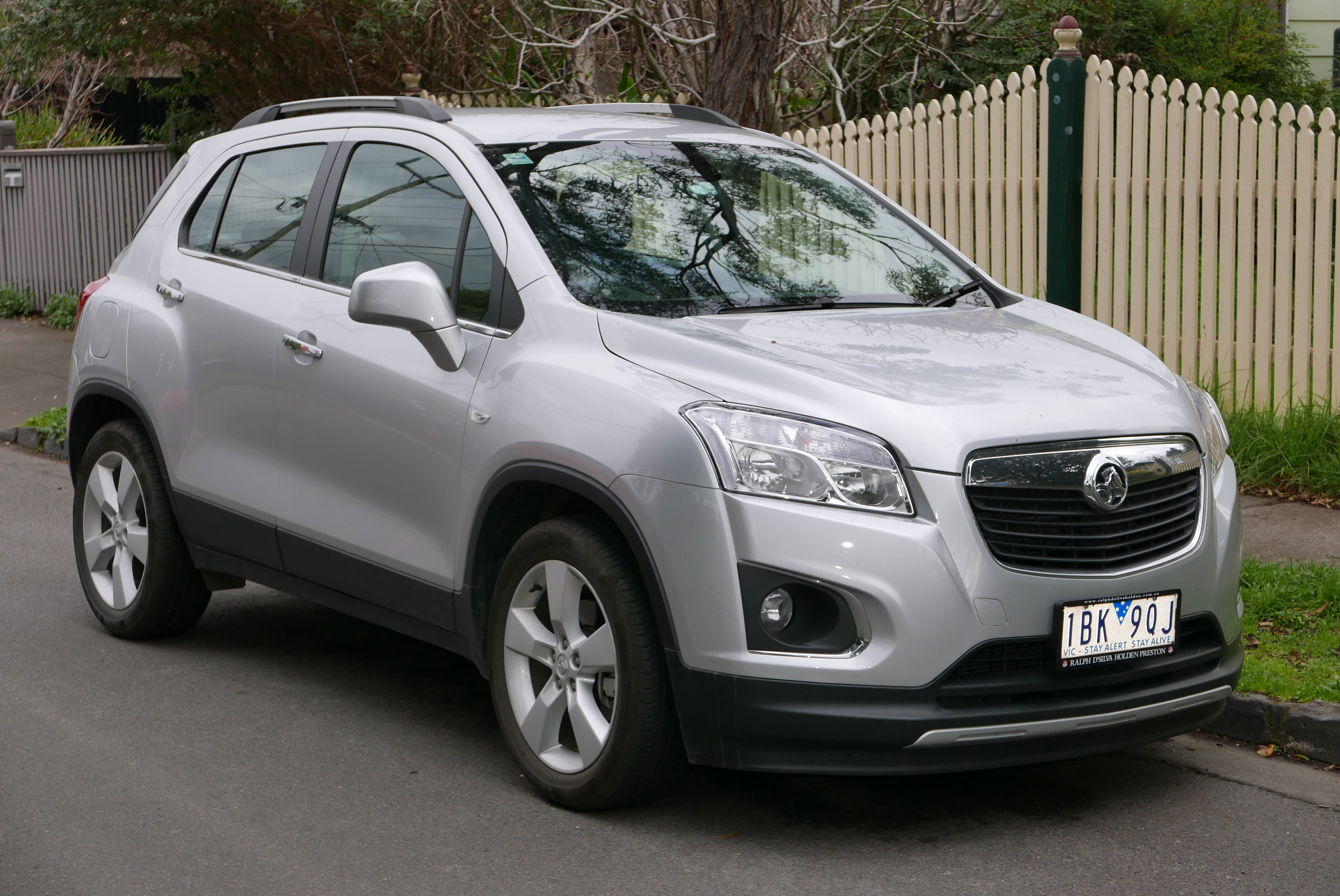
2014 Holden Trax LTZ (pre-facelift)

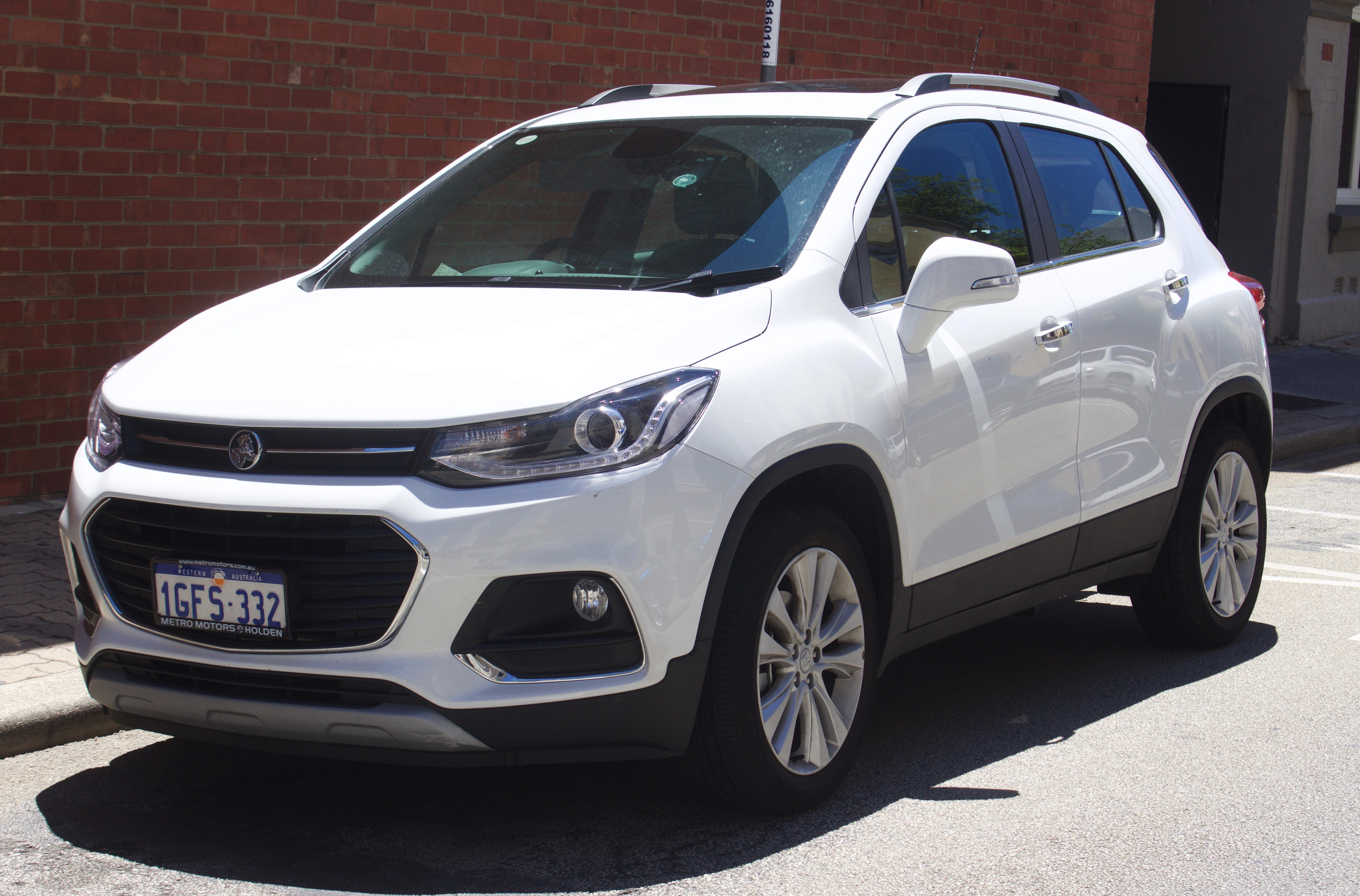
2017 Holden Trax LTZ (facelift)

==== Chevrolet Tracker ====
In Russia and South America, the Trax was instead named the Chevrolet Tracker, which was the name used in North and Latin America from 1989 to 1991 and 1999 to 2008 for a Chevrolet/Geo version of the Suzuki Sidekick.

=== Engines ===
The Trax was offered in different markets with different choices of drivetrains. In Latin America, the Trax was only available with the 1.8L gasoline engine. In Canada and the U.S., only the 1.4L turbocharged gasoline engine was offered. In Mexico and Australia (from 2015), it was available both with 1.8 and 1.4L turbocharged engines. European customers could choose from a 1.4L turbo gasoline engine, a 1.6L gasoline engine, and a 1.7L diesel engine.

Gasoline
Type	Power	Torque	Emissions CO_{2}	Years
1,364 cc (83.2 cu in) I4 turbo (A14NET)	140 PS (103 kW; 138 bhp) at 4,900 rpm	200 N⋅m (148 lb⋅ft) at 1,850–4,900 rpm	139 g/km	2013–2022
1,598 cc (97.5 cu in) I4 (A16XER)	115 PS (85 kW; 113 bhp) at 6,000 rpm	155 N⋅m (114 lb⋅ft) at 4,000 rpm	153 g/km	2013–2022
1,796 cc (109.6 cu in) I4 (A18XER)	140 PS (103 kW; 138 bhp) at 6,300 rpm	175 N⋅m (129 lb⋅ft) at 3,800 rpm	n/a	2013–2022
Diesel
Type	Power	Torque	Emissions CO_{2}	Years
1,686 cc (102.9 cu in) I4 turbo (CDTI)	130 PS (96 kW; 128 bhp)at 4,000 rpm	300 N⋅m (221 lb⋅ft) at 2,000–2,500 rpm	120 g/km	2013–2014
1,598 cc (97.5 cu in) I4 turbo (CDTI) (Korea)	136 PS (100 kW; 134 hp) at 3500–4000 rpm	320 N⋅m (236 lb⋅ft) at 2000–2250 rpm	129 g/km	2015–2022

=== Safety ===
Euro NCAP test results* (2013)
Test	Points	%
Overall:	5 /5 stars	
Adult occupant:	34	94%
Child occupant:	42	85%
Pedestrian:	23	64%
Safety assist:	7	81%

2015 Chevrolet Trax IIHS scores
Small overlap front (Driver)	Good
Small overlap front (Passenger)	Acceptable
Moderate overlap front (Original test)	Good
Side (Original test)	Good
Side (Updated test)	Acceptable
Roof strength	Good
Head restraints and seats	Good

ANCAP test results* Holden Trax all variants (2013)
Test	Score
Overall	5 /5 stars
Frontal offset	15.18/16
Side impact	16/16
Pole	2/2
Seat belt reminders	2/3
Whiplash protection	Adequate
Pedestrian protection	Adequate
Electronic stability control	Standard

=== Discontinuation ===
In China and South America, the first-generation Trax was discontinued and replaced by the Tracker in 2019. It was similar in size to the Trax, but built on a new platform (GEM) for emerging markets and not intended for North America.

General Motors discontinued the first-generation Trax, as well as the related Buick Encore, following the 2022 model year in North America.

== Second generation (2023) ==
Second generation
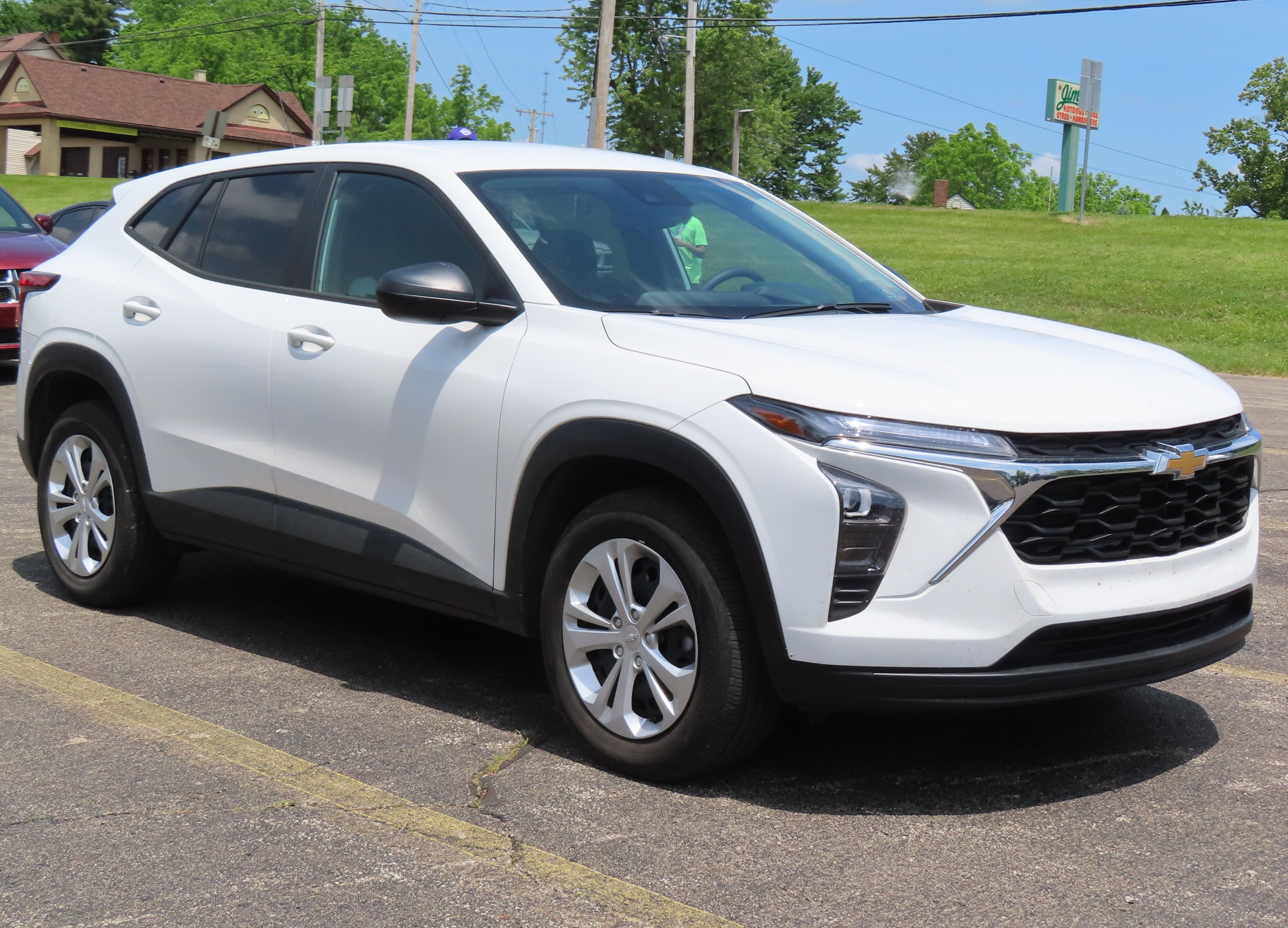
- 2024 Chevrolet Trax LS

Overview
- Model code: 9BQC
- Also called: Chevrolet Seeker (China)
- Production: February 2023 – present
- Model years: 2024–present (North America)
- Assembly: South Korea: Changwon (GM Korea); China: (SAIC-GM)

Body and chassis
- Layout: Front-engine, front-wheel-drive
- Platform: GM VSS-F (9BXX)
- Related: Buick Envista

Powertrain
- Engine: Gasoline: 1.2 L LIH turbo I3; 1.5 L LYX turbo I4 (China); Gasoline flex-fuel: 1.2 L LBP turbo I3
- Transmission: 6-speed automatic; CVT (China)

Dimensions
- Wheelbase: 2,700 mm (106.3 in)
- Length: 4,537 mm (178.6 in)
- Width: 1,823 mm (71.8 in)
- Height: 1,560 mm (61.4 in)
- Curb weight: 1,388 kg (3,060 lb)

The second-generation Trax debuted in China in July 2022 as the Chevrolet Seeker (Chinese: 星迈罗; pinyin: xīng mài luó).

The North American version was unveiled in October 2022, with sales beginning in the second quarter of 2023 for the 2024 model year. It is larger and lower than its predecessor. Although larger than the Trailblazer, it is priced below that model; reports indicated an average transaction price approximately $5,000 lower.

Chevrolet considered using a different nameplate for the North American market to reflect changes in size and exterior styling, but retained the Trax name due to its broader recognition.

In North America, the model is offered in five trim levels: LS, 1RS, LT, 2RS, and Activ. The Activ trim includes titanium-chrome exterior accents and a simulated rear skid plate. Front-wheel drive is standard, and all-wheel drive is not offered.

All North American models are powered by a 1.2 L turbocharged three-cylinder gasoline or flex-fuel engine producing 137 horsepower (102 kW; 139 PS) and 162 pound-feet (220 N⋅m; 22.4 kg⋅m) of torque, paired with a six-speed automatic transmission. U.S.-market vehicles are manufactured in South Korea. The Trax has 25.6 cubic feet (725 liters) of cargo capacity behind the rear seats and 54.1 cubic feet (1532 liters) with the rear seats folded.

In China, the vehicle is equipped with a 1.5 L turbocharged four-cylinder gasoline engine paired with a continuously variable transmission (CVT).

Sales in South Korea began in March 2023, with RS, Activ, LT, and LS trims available.

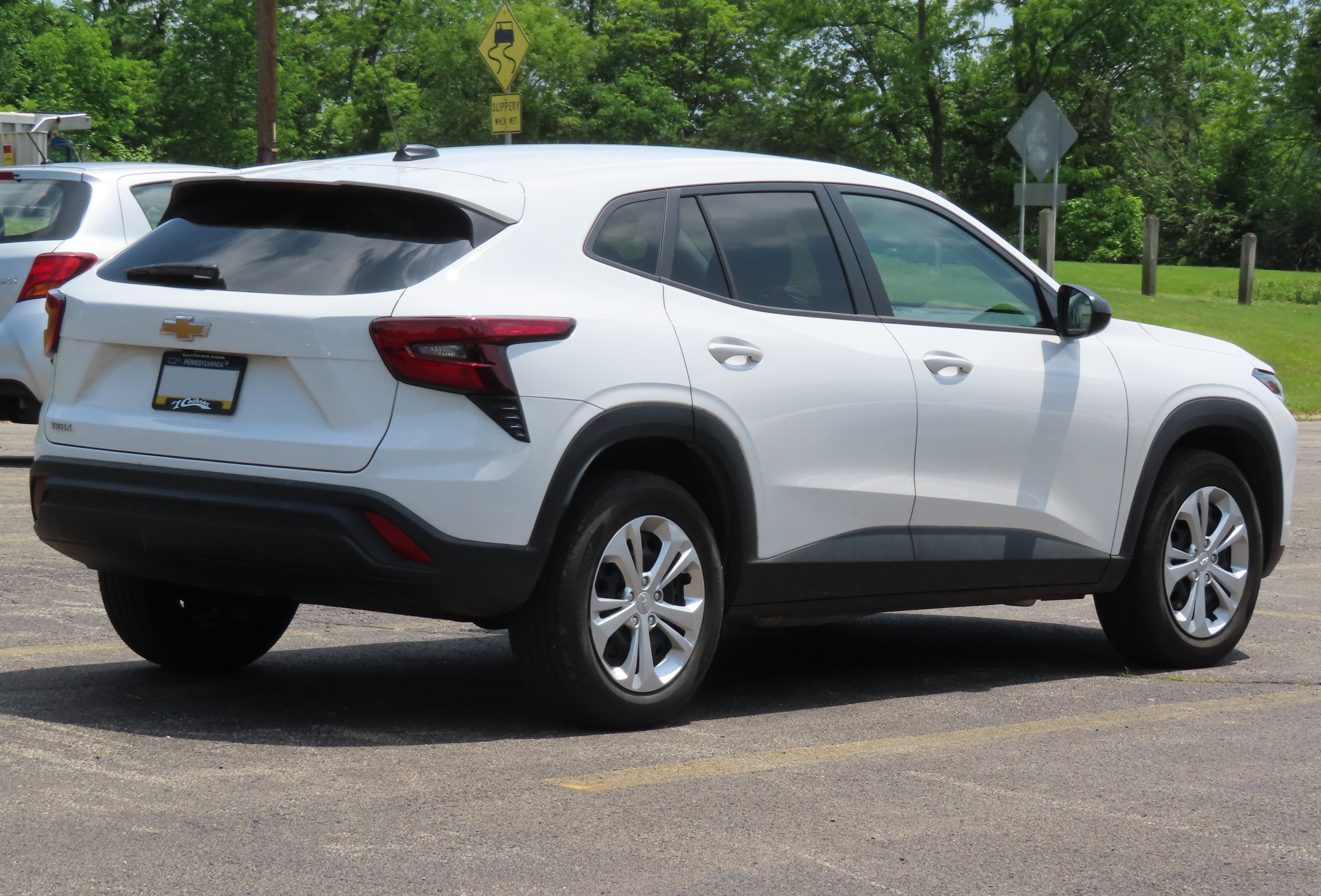
2024 Chevrolet Trax LS, rear view

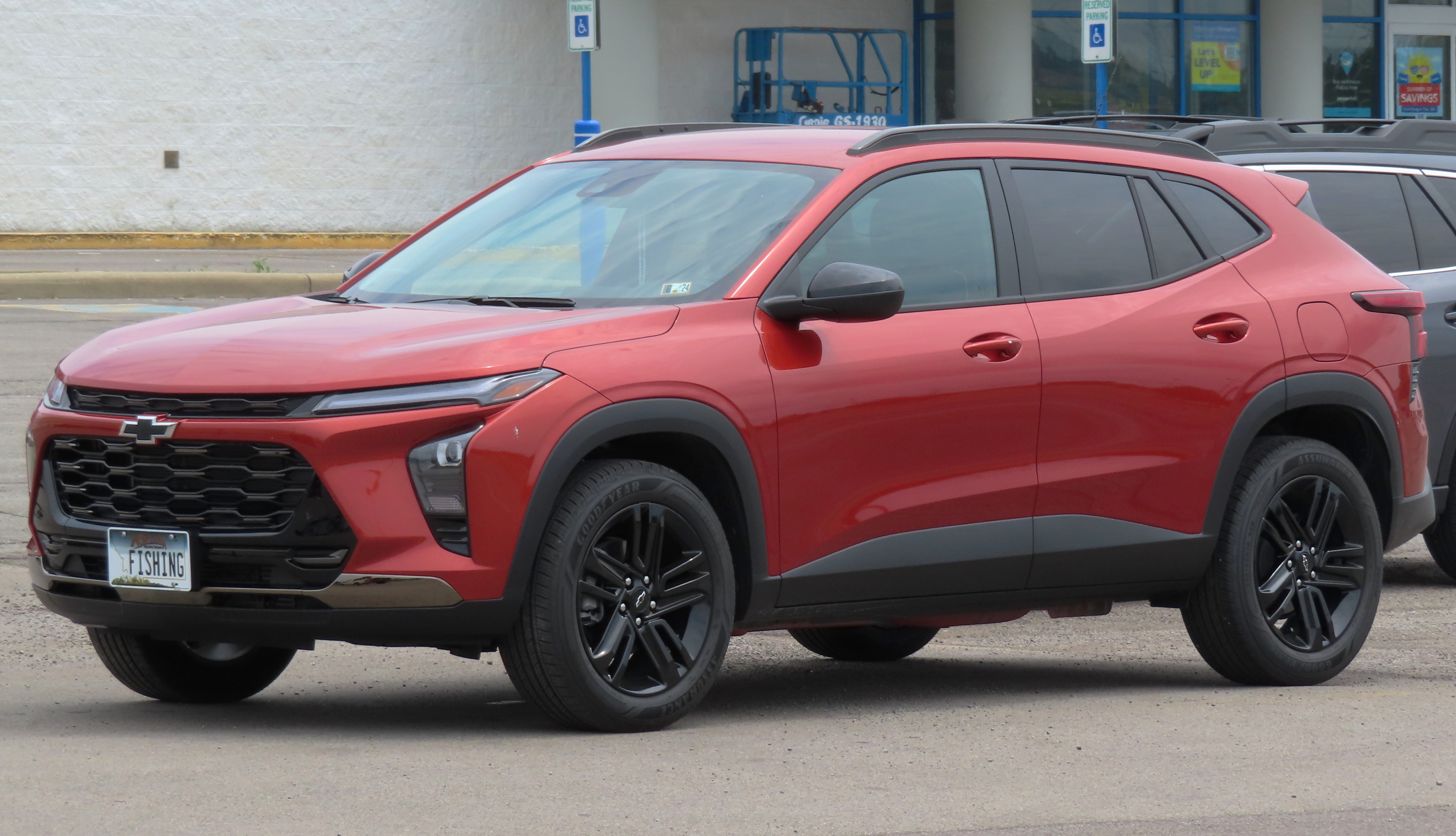
2024 Chevrolet Trax Activ

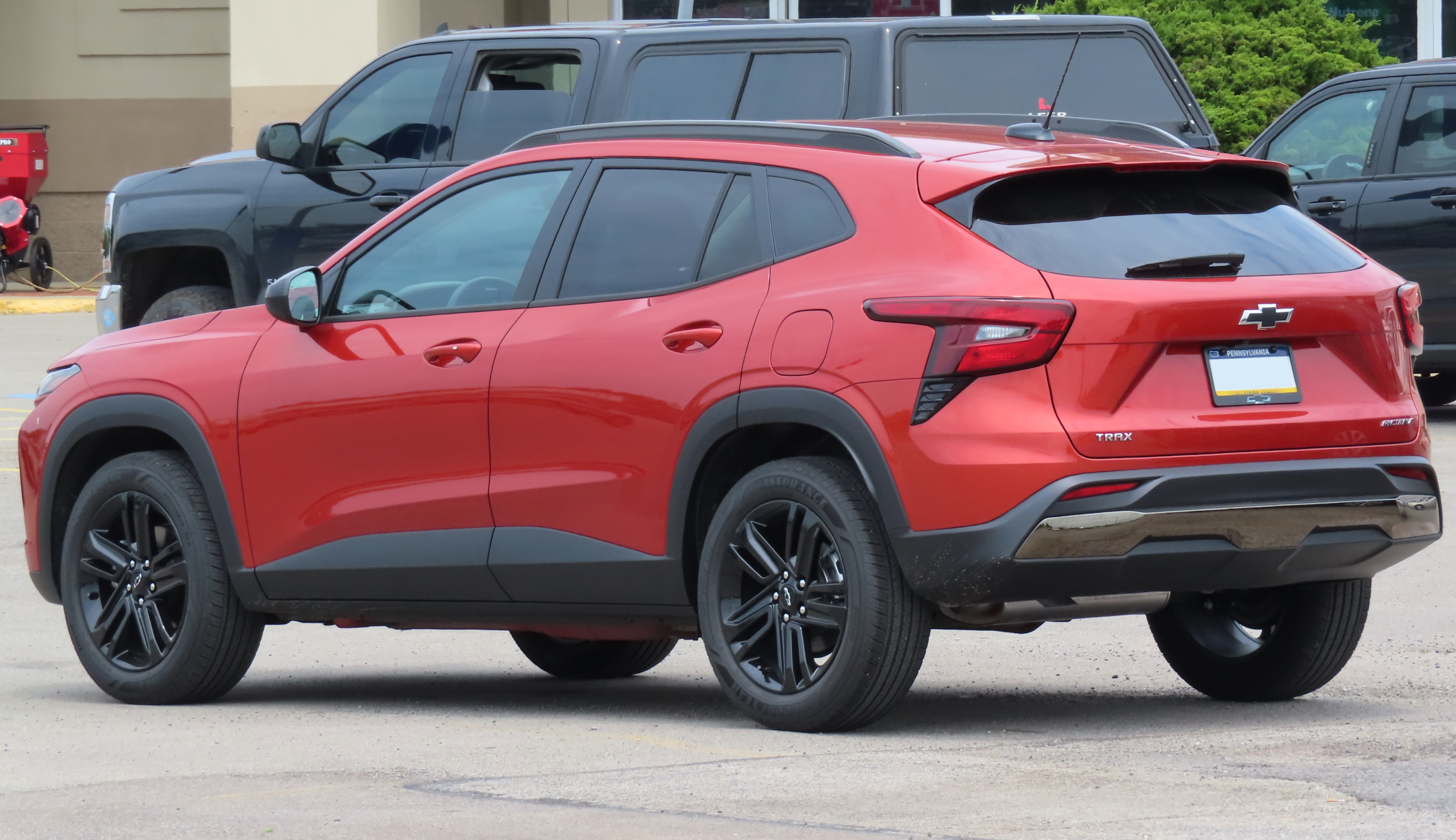
2024 Chevrolet Trax Activ, rear view

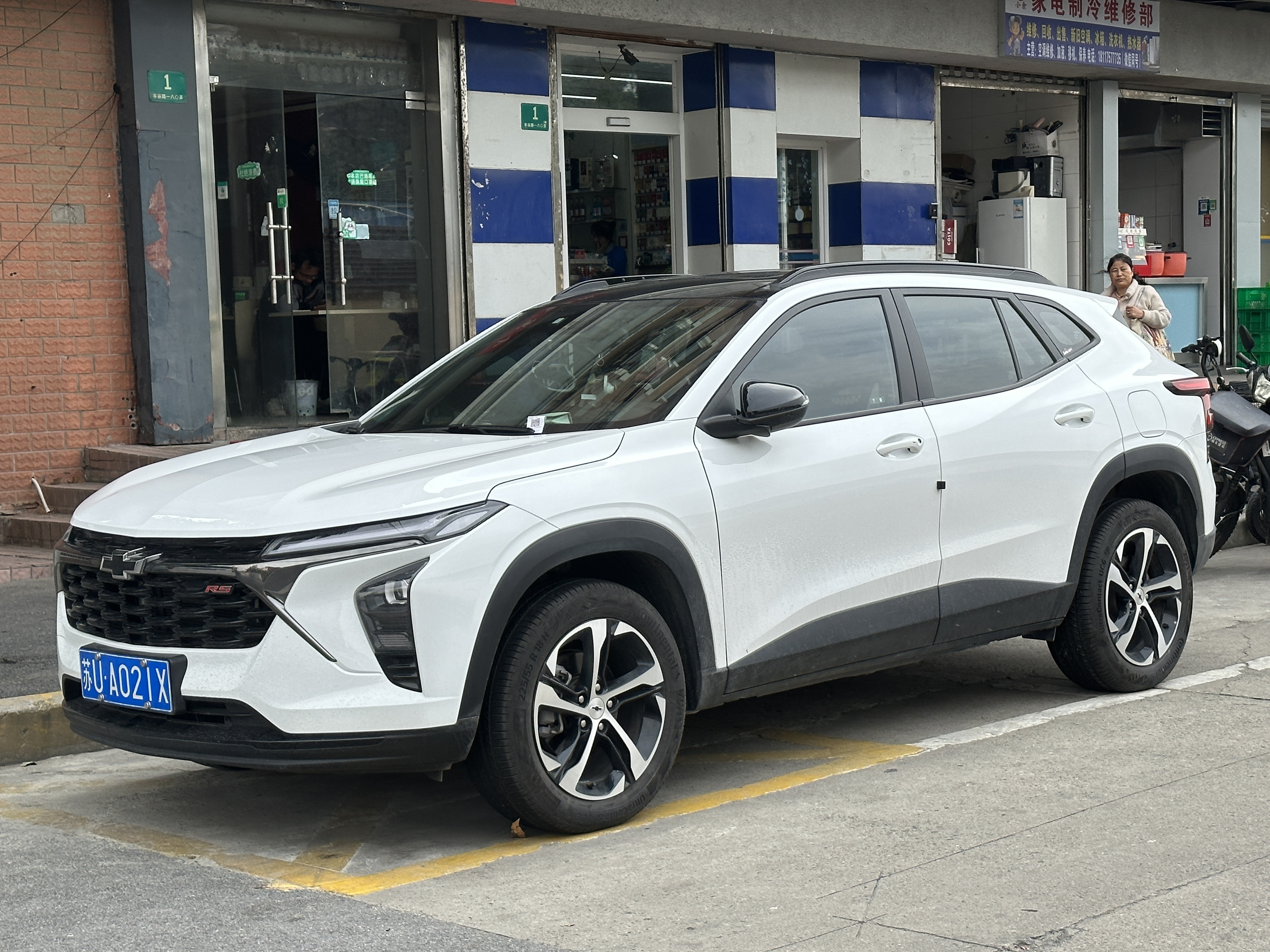
Chevrolet Seeker (China)

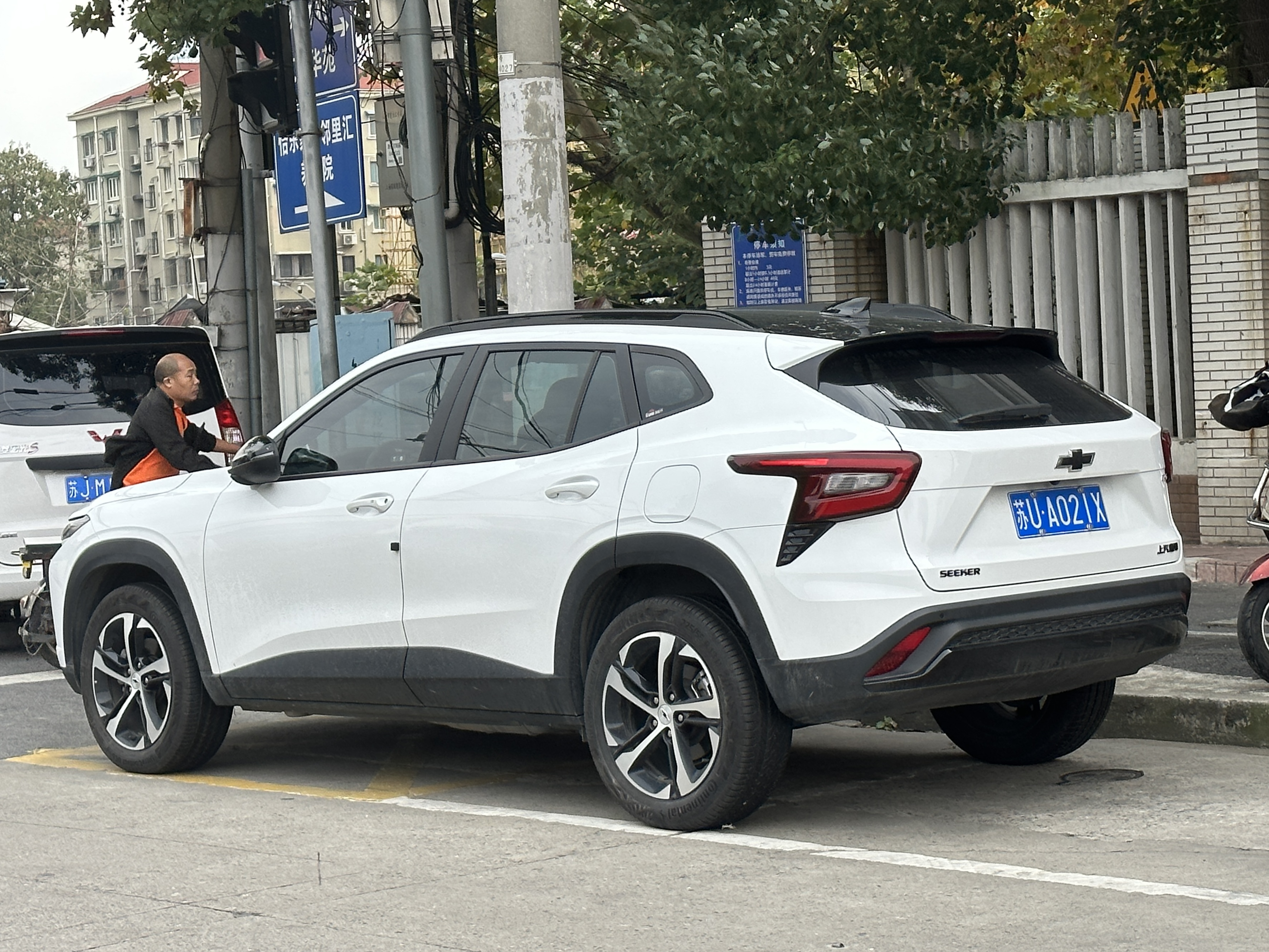
Chevrolet Seeker (China), rear view

=== 2027 facelift ===
A facelift for the second generation Trax was unveiled on 9 October 2026. Styling changes include a revised grille and front fascia, wider LED taillights, and new color and wheel choices. The interior receives a larger 11.3-inch central infotainment screen and an 11-inch instrument panel, both running on Google. Some materials and finishes have also been reworked. In terms of equipment, the facelifted Trax receives a power tailgate and 20 new standard driver assistance features due an updated electronic architecture.

== Sales ==
Calendar year	U.S	Canada	China		South Korea	Mexico	Argentina	Indonesia
Calendar year	U.S	Canada	Trax	Seeker	South Korea	Mexico	Argentina	Indonesia
2013				—N/a		16,611	2,148	—N/a
2014	739	8,533	43,682	—N/a		19,571	4,771	—N/a
2015	63,030	8,156	50,736	—N/a		24,593	6,305	26
2016	79,016	9,072	37,636	—N/a		26,777	9,893	1,570
2017	79,289	5,965	17,290	—N/a	16,549	19,324	12,639	1,969
2018	89,916	4,471	6,346	—N/a	12,787	16,178	9,155	1,454
2019	116,816	5,085	462	—N/a	12,541	15,250	5,705	973
2020	106,299	3,888		—N/a	6,853	6,352		1
2021	42,590	2,395		—N/a	2,540	87		—N/a
2022	26,597	651	—N/a	2,257	1,240			—N/a
2023	109,382	6,469	—N/a	5,034	23,656	2,288		—N/a
2024	200,689	16,575	—N/a	1,005	18,634	6,985		—N/a
2025	206,339	22,280	—N/a	129	12,109	6,305		—N/a
