= GM Medium Diesel engine =

GM Medium Diesel Engine
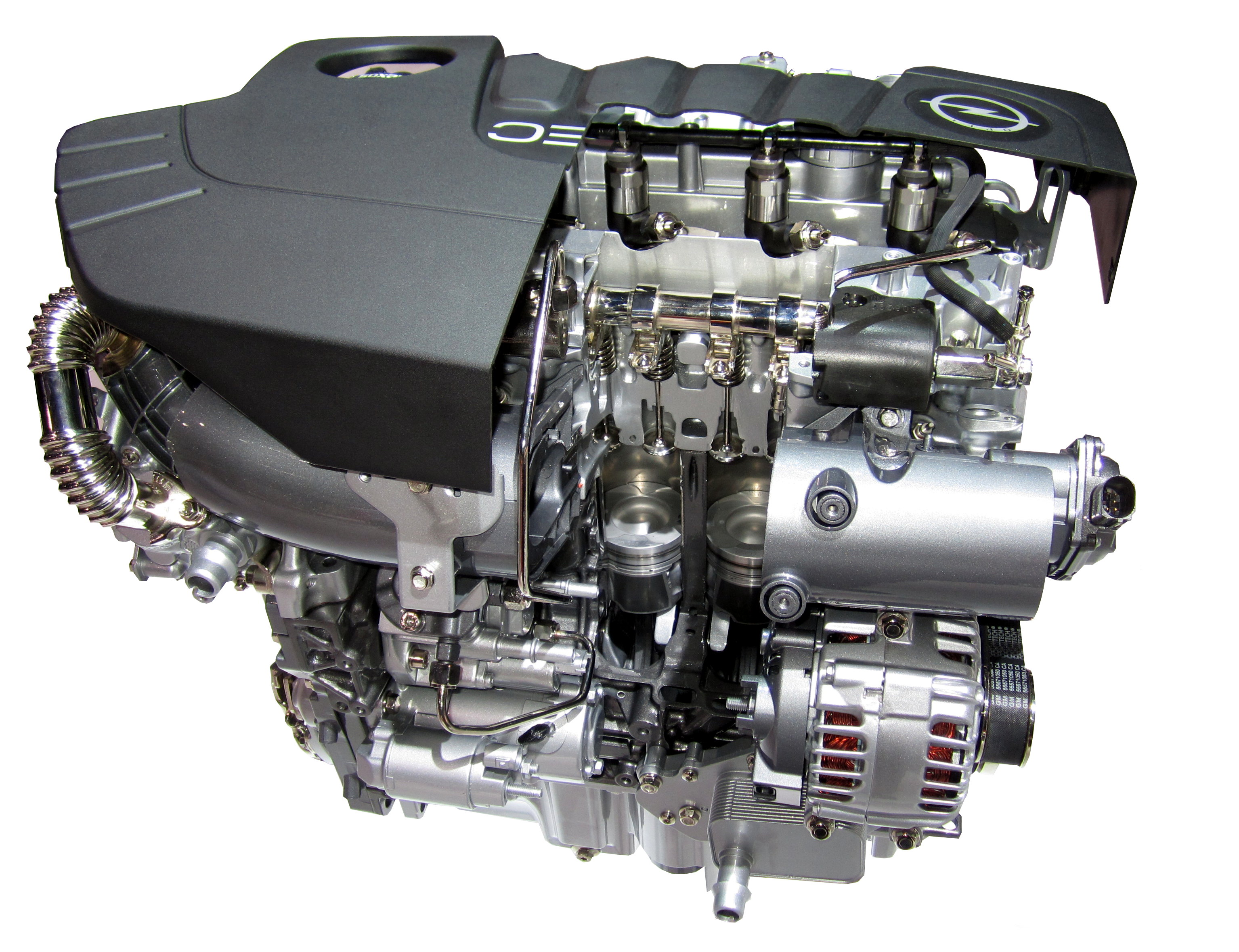
- Section of the Opel 1.6 CDTI ecoFLEX engine from 2013

Overview
- Manufacturer: General Motors
- Production: 2013–present

Layout
- Configuration: Straight-3 (2019); Straight-4 (2013)
- Displacement: 1.5 L; 91.3 cu in (1,496 cc); 1.6 L; 97.5 cu in (1,598 cc); 2.0 L; 121.7 cu in (1,995 cc)
- Cylinder bore: 79.7 mm (3.14 in); 84 mm (3.31 in)
- Piston stroke: 80.1 mm (3.15 in); 90 mm (3.54 in)
- Cylinder block material: Aluminium
- Cylinder head material: Aluminium
- Valvetrain: DOHC 4 valves x cyl.
- Compression ratio: 16.0:1

Combustion
- Turbocharger: Twin-turbo (in 2016 Opel Astra K)
- Fuel system: Common rail
- Fuel type: Diesel
- Cooling system: Water-cooled

Output
- Power output: 95–160 hp (71–119 kW; 96–162 PS)
- Torque output: 280–356 N⋅m (207–263 lb⋅ft)

Emissions
- Emissions target standard: Euro 6
- Emissions control systems: SCR, AdBlue

Chronology
- Predecessor: Family B/Circle L engine

The Medium Diesel Engine (MDE) is a four-cylinder diesel engine developed by General Motors and branded "1.6 CDTI Ecotec" in most markets. Opel also adds the marketing term "Whisper Diesel" in some markets, claiming relatively low levels of noise, vibration, and harshness. Production commenced in late 2013 at Szentgotthárd, Hungary. The MDE is Opel's first all-aluminum diesel engine and offers a power density of 85 hp (63 kW) per liter 136 PS (100 kW; 134 hp) in its most powerful version. Maximum power and torque have been increased versus the previous-generation 1.7-liter engine, while fuel consumption has been reduced by up to 10 percent compared with a 2.0-liter CDTI engine of similar power output. This new 1.6 CDTI engine will replace the current 1.7-liter and lower-powered 2.0-liter diesel engines in a wide range of Opel models, with more- and less-powerful versions to come. The most powerful version of this engine, delivering 136 PS (100 kW; 134 hp) at 3,500–4,000 rpm and 320 N⋅m (236 lb⋅ft) at 2,000 rpm, was first introduced in the 2013 Opel Zafira Tourer, and later in the 2014 Opel Astra J and restyled 2014 Opel Meriva B. In 2014, versions were released with power outputs of 110 and 95 PS (81 and 70 kW; 108 and 94 hp).

The engine's displacement is 1.6 L (1,598 cc) and it has a bore/stroke ratio of 79.7 mm × 80.1 mm (3.14 in × 3.15 in), attaining cylinder pressures of 180 bar (2,600 psi) and a compression ratio of 16.0:1. It uses an aluminum engine block, die-cast aluminum bedplate, and an aluminum cylinder head. A chain driven dual overhead camshaft, employing weight-saving hollow sections and lobes, operates four valves per cylinder with low-friction, hydraulic roller finger followers. The pistons are made from aluminum for reduced reciprocating mass, feature a concave, shallow-bowl profile to facilitate efficient combustion, and are cooled by under-skirt oil spraying. The crankshaft employs four counterweights to minimize mass, and both it and the con-rods are made of forged steel. The engine features multiple improvements to reduce NVH, such as a cam cover made of GRP and fully decoupled from the engine to reduce noise and vibration, while also saving weight compared to aluminum; a composite intake manifold encapsulated in acoustic padding as well as an external plastic shield that both significantly reduce noise emissions; a mechanical crankshaft isolator which reduces radiated noise and torsional vibrations in the accessory drive system; and scissor gears for the timing drive system, incorporating tooth profiles ground with a Low Noise Shifting (LNS) process for optimal noise reduction. More than 150 patented diesel control functions are deployed by the engine's ECU, which was developed in-house by General Motors and jointly engineered in Italy (by GM Powertrain Torino), Germany, and the United States, and will be used in all future GM four-cylinder diesel engines.

Low fuel consumption and Euro 6-standard emissions (effective from September 2015) are also made possible by the use of Opel's "BlueInjection" Selective catalytic reduction (SCR) system, which injects AdBlue, a urea-and-water solution, into the exhaust stream. The solution decomposes into ammonia, which is then stored on a catalyst substrate. When nitrogen oxide (NO_{x}) from the exhaust gases enters the catalyst, it is then selectively reduced to nitrogen and water.

From 2013, this engine replaced the 1.7 L CDTI as well as lower-powered variants of the 2.0 L CDTI Ecotec 110 and 130 PS (81 and 96 kW; 108 and 128 hp) engines in Opel cars, and also superseded the 1.3 L CDTI engines in the Corsa, Meriva and Astra. GM also introduced the MDE engine in the 2017 Chevrolet Cruze and the 2018 Chevrolet Equinox and GMC Terrain sold in the United States.

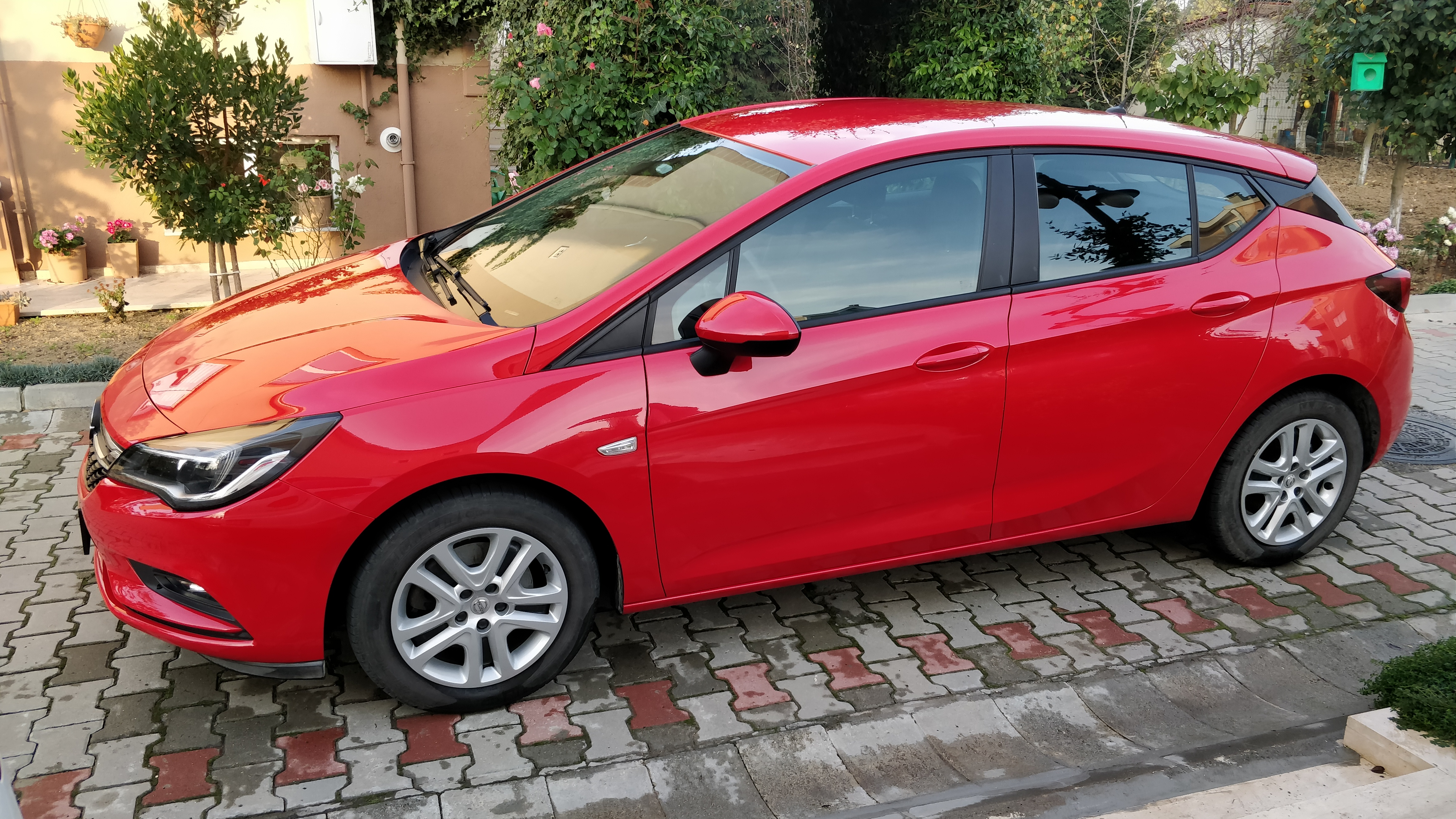
Opel Astra K uses the B16DTH engine variant of GM Medium Diesel engine

== Applications and usage ==
The applications of these engines are summarized below:

Variant	Cylinder arrangement	Displacement	Bore and stroke (mm)	Charging	Power hp/rpm	Torque N⋅m/rpm		Production year
F15DVC	Inline 3	1496	84 x 90	Turbodiesel; Direct injection common rail	105/3250	260/ 1500–2500	Opel Astra K 1.5 CDTI 105 HP	from 08/2019
F15DVH	Inline 3	1496	84 x 90	Turbodiesel; Direct injection common rail	122/3500	300/ 1750–2500	Opel Astra K 1.5 CDTI 122 HP	from 08/2019
F15DVH	Inline 3	1496	84 x 90	Turbodiesel; Direct injection common rail	122/3500	300/ 1750–2500	Opel Insignia B 1.5 CDTI (122 HP)	from 03/2020
B16DTC	Inline 4	1598	79,7 x 80,1	Turbodiesel; Direct injection common rail	95/3500	280/ 1500–1750	Opel Meriva B 1.6 CDTI 95 HP	2014–17
B16DTE	Inline 4	1598	79,7 x 80,1	Turbodiesel; Direct injection common rail	95/3500	280/ 1500–1750	Opel Astra K 1.6 CDTI 95 HP	07/2015-06/2018
B16DTL	Inline 4	1598	79,7 x 80,1	Turbodiesel; Direct injection common rail	110/4000	300/ 2000–2250	Opel Insignia B 1.6 CDTI (110 HP)	02/2017-10/2019
B16DTL	Inline 4	1598	79,7 x 80,1	Turbodiesel; Direct injection common rail	110/4000	300/ 2000–2250	Opel Mokka 1.6 CDTI 110HP	06/2015-08/2016
B16DTL	Inline 4	1598	79,7 x 80,1	Turbodiesel; Direct injection common rail	110/4000	300/ 2000–2250	Opel Mokka X 1.6 CDTI 110 HP	09/2016-06/2019
B16DTL	Inline 4	1598	79,7 x 80,1	Turbodiesel; Direct injection common rail	110/4000	300/ 1750–2000	Opel Astra J 1.6 CDTI 110 HP	2014–18
B16DTN	Inline 4	1598	79,7 x 80,1	Turbodiesel; Direct injection common rail	110/4000	300/ 1750–2000	Opel Meriva B 1.6 CDTI 110 HP	2014–17
B16DTU	Inline 4	1598	79,7 x 80,1	Turbodiesel; Direct injection common rail	110/4000	300/ 1750–2000	Opel Astra K 1.6 CDTI 110 HP	07/2015-06/2018
D16DTU	Inline 4	1598	79,7 x 80,1	Turbodiesel; Direct injection common rail	110/4000	300/ 1750–2000	Opel Astra K 1.6 CDTI 110 HP	06/2018-07/2019
B16DTJ	Inline 4	1598	79,7 x 80,1	Turbodiesel; Direct injection common rail	120/4000	320/ 2000–2250	Opel Insignia A 1.6 CDTI 120 HP	08/2015-02/2017
B16DTJ	Inline 4	1598	79,7 x 80,1	Turbodiesel; Direct injection common rail	120/4000	320/ 2000–2250	Opel Zafira Tourer 1.6 CDTI 120 HP	06/2014-11/2018
B16DTH	Inline 4	1598	79,7 x 80,1	Turbodiesel; Direct injection common rail	136/4000	320/ 2000–2250	Opel Astra J 1.6 CDTI 136 HP 5p	05/2014-08/2015
B16DTH	Inline 4	1598	79,7 x 80,1	Turbodiesel; Direct injection common rail	136/4000	320/ 2000–2250	Opel Astra J 1.6 CDTI 136 HP Sedan, Sports Tourer e GTC	05/2014-11/2018
B16DTH	Inline 4	1598	79,7 x 80,1	Turbodiesel; Direct injection common rail	136/4000	320/ 2000–2250	Opel Astra K 1.6 CDTI 136 HP	07/2015-06/2018
B16DTH	Inline 4	1598	79,7 x 80,1	Turbodiesel; Direct injection common rail	136/4000	320/ 2000–2250	Opel Insignia A 1.6 CDTI 136 HP	08/2015-02/2017
B16DTH	Inline 4	1598	79,7 x 80,1	Turbodiesel; Direct injection common rail	136/4000	320/ 2000–2250	Opel Insignia B 1.6 CDTI 136 HP	02/2017-02/2020
B16DTH	Inline 4	1598	79,7 x 80,1	Turbodiesel; Direct injection common rail	136/4000	320/ 2000–2250	Opel Meriva 1.6 CDTI 136 HP	02/2014-05/2017
B16DTH	Inline 4	1598	79,7 x 80,1	Turbodiesel; Direct injection common rail	136/4000	320/ 2000–2250	Opel Zafira Tourer 1.6 CDTI 136 HP	06/2013-07/2019
B16DTH	Inline 4	1598	79,7 x 80,1	Turbodiesel; Direct injection common rail	136/4000	320/ 2000–2250	Opel Mokka 1.6 CDTI (136 HP)	04/2015-08/2016
B16DTH	Inline 4	1598	79,7 x 80,1	Turbodiesel; Direct injection common rail	136/4000	320/ 2000–2250	Opel Mokka X 1.6 CDTI (136 HP)	09/2016-06/2019
D16DTH	Inline 4	1598	79,7 x 80,1	Turbodiesel; Direct injection common rail	136/4000	320/ 2000–2250	Opel Astra K 1.6 CDTI (136 HP)	06/2018-07/2019
B16DTR	Inline 4	1598	79,7 x 80,1	Biturbodiesel direct injection common rail	160/4000	350/ 1500–2250	Opel Astra K 1.6 CDTI Biturbo	10/2015-06/2018
D16DTR	Inline 4	1598	79,7 x 80,1	Biturbodiesel direct injection common rail	150/4000	350/ 1500–2250	Opel Astra K 1.6 CDTI Biturbo	06/2018-04/2019
F20DVH	Inline 4	1995	84 x 90	Turbodiesel; Direct injection common rail	174/3500	381/ 1500–2750	Opel Insignia B 2.0	from 03/2020

== Timing chain malfunction ==
The engine is prone to early timing chain wear and failure, early symptoms include a rattling sound during start up and during operation eventually leading to total engine failure. This issue has never been addressed by the manufacturer and appears to affect all production years. The timing chain is located at the rear of the engine and as such replacement is significantly harder and expensive than a typical (front) timing chain.

This issue is easily averted by using 0w20 oil as now recommended by Vauxhall/Opel and the chain replacement tends to be carried out alongside clutch replacement as the gearbox will already be removed from that side of the engine. Replacing the stock chain tensioner with a part from the GM Duramax 3.0 engine also helps as the chain tensioner from the larger engine is a more robust part.

The rattle has been known to start as early as 50 000 miles, but this is similar to the issue with the 1.3 LSF engine used in previous Astras. If the oil and filter is changed regularly, the replacement window becomes significantly larger – as much as 100 000 miles. Some customers reported that the rattle sound appear briefly during startup and at the range between 1 500 and 2 500 rpm.

Vauxhall recommends 20 000 miles or 12 month oil services, it is suggested halving that to 10 000 or 6 months. The typical repair times of the timing chain are 14 to 16 hours within a workshop with a two post vehicle lift.

== See also ==
- GM Medium Gasoline Engine
- GM Small Gasoline Engine
- List of GM engines
