= GM Powertrain Torino =

Punch Torino
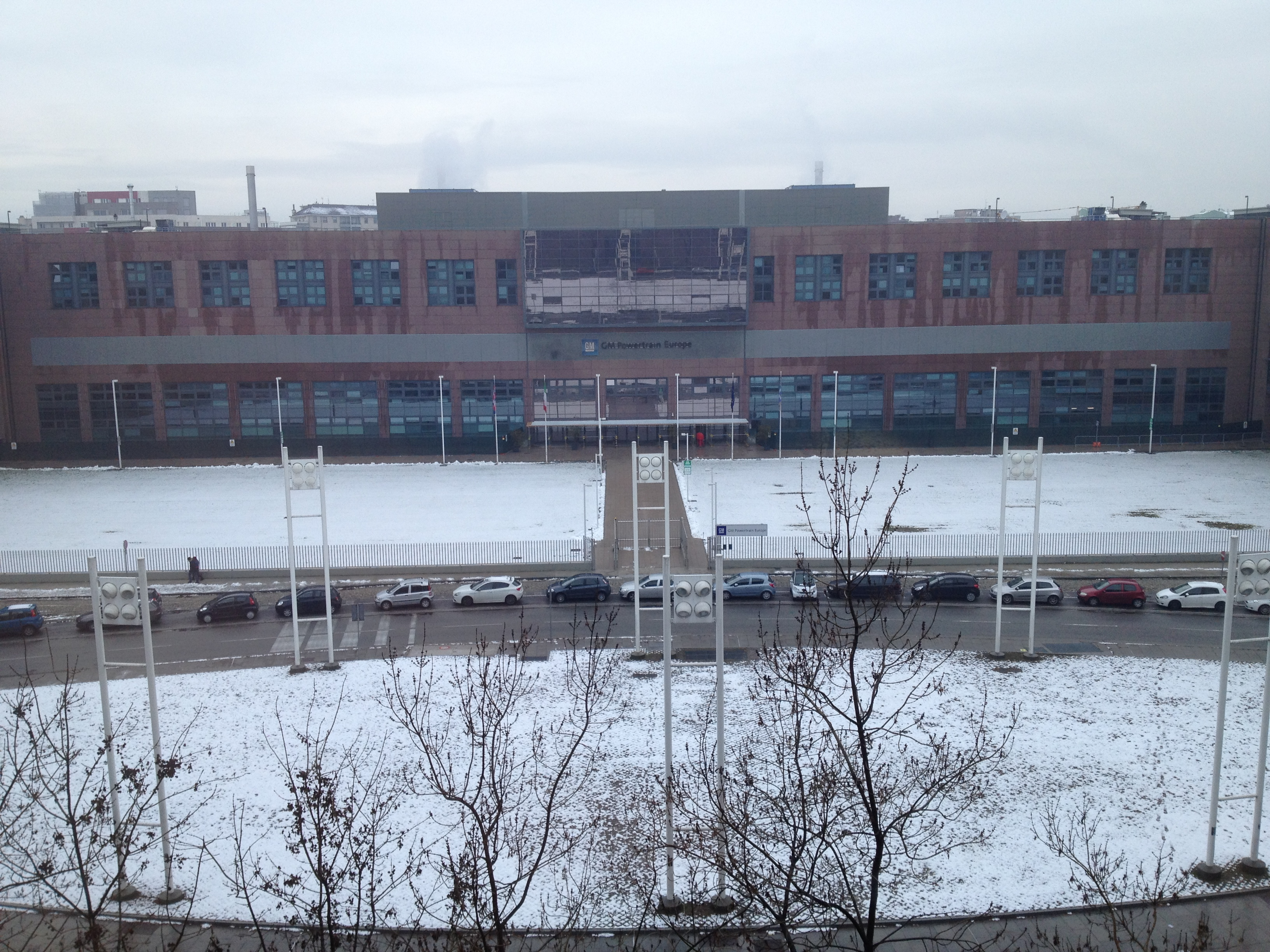
- Industry: Engineering
- Founded: 2005; 21 years ago
- Headquarters: Turin, Italy
- Owner: Punch Group
- Number of employees: 650
- Website: punchtorino.com

GM Powertrain Torino is a powertrain engineering center headquartered in Turin, Italy and was founded in 2005. In September 2008 the center moved into its new Politecnico di Torino facility, making General Motors the first automotive company to become a physical part of a university campus. The Engineering Center currently engineers and develops diesel engines, controls and propulsion systems, and employs over 650 people.

GM Powertrain Europe was a center for development of diesel engines and related electronic control of GM globally, and designs propulsion systems for Opel, Chevrolet, GMC and Buick. From design to the study of virtual components or tests on the engine benches – everything took place in the laboratories and test cells of GM Powertrain Europe in Turin.

GM Powertrain Europe Turin represented a strategic asset for GM globally. In Europe, the engineering center provides Opel vehicles with premium diesel technology, like the all-new 1.6 CDTI engine, the quietest diesel in its class that has earned the nickname ‘Whisper Diesel’. Diesel engines of the future which are designed in Turin all share common characteristics: high-tech solutions offering moderate fuel consumption and CO_{2} emissions. GM sold it to Punch in 2020, following the exit of GM from European market. Since Peugeot already had Diesel engines, the design center was useless to GM, therefore it was sold out.

During the alliance between Fiat and GM, it was part of Fiat-GM Powertrain.

== See also ==
- GM Medium Diesel engine
- List of GM engines
- Ecotec
- GM Powertrain Poland
- Fiat Powertrain
- JTD
