= Fiat JTD engine =

JTD/MultiJet engine

Overview
- Manufacturer: FCA; FPT Industrial; Sofim; GM Powertrain Torino; CNH Industrial; VM Motori
- Also called: JTD/Multijet (Fiat, Lancia, Maserati and Jeep); JTD/JTDm (Alfa Romeo); DDiS (Suzuki and Maruti Suzuki); CDTI (Opel and Vauxhall); VCDi (Chevrolet and Daewoo); TiD and TTiD (Cadillac and Saab)
- Production: 1996–present

Layout
- Cylinder block material: Common rail
- Cylinder head material: Direct injection

Combustion
- Fuel type: Turbo diesel
- Oil system: Wet sump
- Cooling system: Water-cooled

Multijet is a Fiat and General Motors joint venture, established in 1996, to manufacture diesel engines with turbo and common rail direct injection technology. Vehicles under dozens of brands have been equipped with Multijet engines. Ownership of some Fiat Multijet designs is shared with General Motors as part of a settlement of the failed merger between the two auto conglomerates. The GM Powertrain Torino group in Turin, Italy, manages its interest in these engines. Some PSA Peugeot Citroën diesel engines are also rebadged JTD units, and vice versa. Fiat's common-rail diesel engine is also known as JTD, an initialism of UniJet Turbo Diesel.

== Characteristics ==
The main improvement that distinguishes the Multijet from previous generations of common-rail diesel engines from FCA is the combustion process of the fuel, which is split into multiple injections, thus allowing for a more complete, quieter combustion in the cylinder. Compared to the first-generation JTD engines (Unijet system), which only featured a smaller pilot and a larger main injection, Multijet is capable of up to five injections per combustion cycle which enables better, more efficient cold running, better performance especially in the lower rev-range, quieter operation, as well as even lower consumption and emissions. The time between injections has been reduced to 150 microseconds while the minimal injection quantity has been reduced from two to less than one microlitre. This enables even mid-sized sedans like the Alfa Romeo 156 and Lancia Lybra equipped with the 1.9L JTD to achieve fuel economy upwards of 45 miles per US gallon (5.2 L/100 km; 54 mpg_{‑imp}) on country roads and highways while offering an equal amount of torque as the 3.0L 24V V6 engine. A sophisticated electronic control unit controls the injection and changes the injection logic and number of injections based on a multitude of parameters, most importantly revolutions per minute of the engine, engine torque requested by the driver and the temperature of the coolant. The injection pressure of the diesel fuel on the second-generation Multijet is limited to between 1,400 bars (20,000 psi) on the 1.3 Multijet and 1,600 bars (23,000 psi) on the 2.4 Multijet 20V.

=== Multijet II ===
In 2009, Fiat Powertrain introduced the third generation of this technology, called Multijet II. With its new and innovative injectors, with a hydraulically balanced solenoid valve, and even higher injection pressure of 2,000 bars (29,000 psi), it is capable of even more precise controlling of the injected diesel fuel, injecting it in a quicker and more flexible manner. It enables up to eight consecutive injections per combustion cycle and implemented Injection Rate Shaping technology, which provides two very close pilot injections making the fuel delivery more continuous and modulated. This results in an engine that is quiet and has a smoother operation, lower emissions, better fuel mileage and higher performance compared to the previous generation.

== Automotive engines ==
=== 0.9 ===
0.9 L

Overview
- Manufacturer: General Motors
- Also called: XSDE (Xtra Smart Diesel Engine); Smartech Diesel
- Production: 2011–2017

Layout
- Configuration: Inline-3
- Displacement: 936 cc (57.1 cu in)
- Cylinder bore: 69.615 mm (2.74 in)
- Piston stroke: 82.0 mm (3.23 in)
- Valvetrain: DOHC with roller finger followers
- Compression ratio: 16.8:1

Combustion
- Fuel system: Common rail

Output
- Power output: 57 bhp (43 kW; 58 PS)
- Torque output: 150 N⋅m (111 lb⋅ft)

Dimensions
- Length: 553.3 mm (21.78 in)
- Width: 547.3 mm (21.55 in)
- Height: 700.5 mm (27.58 in)
- Dry weight: 130 kg (287 lb)

A 0.9 L (936 cc) 3-cylinder variant, (called XSDE, Xtra Smart Diesel Engine) or Smartech Diesel, was introduced in 2011. Co-developed by GM Powertrain Torino and the GM Technical Center India for the Indian market, the engine is rated at 57 bhp (43 kW; 57 hp) of power and 150 N⋅m (111 lb⋅ft) of torque.

Applications:

- 2011–2017 Chevrolet Beat (India)

=== 1.2 JTDm/Multijet/CDTI/D/DDiS/HDi ===
1.3 L

Overview
- Manufacturer: Fiat Chrysler Automobiles
- Also called: CDTI (Opel); DDiS (Suzuki and Maruti Suzuki); Multijet (Fiat, Jeep and Lancia); JTDm (Alfa Romeo); Quadrajet (Tata); D (Chevrolet); HDi (Groupe PSA)
- Production: 2003–2024

Layout
- Configuration: Inline-4
- Displacement: 1,248 cc (76.2 cu in)
- Cylinder bore: 69.6 mm (2.74 in)
- Piston stroke: 82.0 mm (3.23 in)
- Valvetrain: DOHC
- Compression ratio: 17.6:1

Dimensions
- Dry weight: 140 kg (310 lb)

A small 1248cc/1.2L version (called the SDE, Small Diesel Engine and referred to as a "1.3") was introduced in February 2003. It is produced in Bielsko-Biała, Poland; in Ranjangaon, Pune, India, by the Fiat India Automobiles and Tata Motors joint venture plant, since 2008; and by Maruti Suzuki in Gurgaon, Haryana, India, since 2012. The Multijet 75 PS version was chosen in 2005 as the International Engine of the Year in the 1-litre to 1.4-litre category. There are five versions of this engine: a 70 PS (51 kW; 69 hp) and a 75 PS (55 kW; 74 hp) (used in the Punto, Panda, Doblo, Palio, Albea, Idea, 500; Opel Corsa, Combo, Meriva; Suzuki Ritz, Swift; and Tata Indica Vista), a 85 PS (63 kW; 84 hp) (used in the Fiat 500L and Fiat Doblo), a variable inlet geometry 90 PS (66 kW; 89 hp) (used in the Fiat Grande Punto, Linea; Opel Corsa, Astra; Suzuki Ertiga, SX4; Tata Indigo Manza and Alfa Romeo MiTo) and a 95 PS (70 kW; 94 hp) from the Multijet II generation, and a 105 PS (77 kW; 104 hp) available on the Lancia Ypsilon. The torques are 180 N⋅m (133 lb⋅ft), 190 N⋅m (140 lb⋅ft), 200 N⋅m (148 lb⋅ft) and 210 N⋅m (155 lb⋅ft). At the time of launch, this was the smallest four-cylinder diesel engine available and it had a fuel consumption of 3.3 L/100 km (86 mpg_{‑imp}; 71 mpg_{‑US}) in some applications. The engine is able to meet Euro IV emission standards without the use of a diesel particulate filter. In January 2008, Tata Motors introduced the new Indica Vista model, which features a new Quadrajet branded version of this engine. The second generation Ford Ka uses 1.2 Multijet named as Duratorq TDCi. In GM nomenclature, it is called Small Diesel Engine (SDE).

During 2009, Fiat launched a new generation badged Multijet II, with a new injection management system (up to 8 injections per cycle, instead of 5) and able to meet Euro V emission standards. It is available with several power outputs, from 75 PS (55 kW; 74 hp), with fixed geometry turbocharger, to 95 PS (70 kW; 94 hp), with variable geometry turbocharger.

As of 2013, more than 5 million 1.2 MultiJet engines had been produced. In January 2020, the production of the 1.2 Multijet ended in India, in both the Maruti Suzuki plant and the Fiat-Tata JV, as the BS6 emission regulations came into effect in the country from 1 April 2020. Fiat-Tata built a total of 800,048 engines over 12 years.

==== Applications ====
===== FCA =====
- Alfa Romeo MiTo
- Fiat 500
- Fiat 500L
- Fiat 500X
- Fiat Albea
- Fiat Doblò
- Fiat Fiorino
- Fiat Grande Punto
- Fiat Idea
- Fiat Linea
- Fiat Palio
- Fiat Panda
- Fiat Punto
- Fiat Qubo
- Fiat Strada
- Fiat Tipo (2015)
- Lancia Musa
- Lancia Ypsilon

===== General Motors =====
- Chevrolet Aveo
- Chevrolet Spark
- Chevrolet Spin
- Daewoo Matiz
- Daewoo Gentra
- Opel Agila
- Opel Astra H
- Opel Astra J
- Opel Combo C
- Opel Combo D
- Opel Corsa C
- Opel Corsa D
- Opel Corsa E
- Opel Meriva
- Opel Tigra TwinTop

===== PSA =====
- Citroën Nemo
- Peugeot Bipper

===== Suzuki =====
- Suzuki Baleno
- Suzuki Ciaz
- Suzuki Dzire
- Suzuki Ertiga
- Suzuki Ignis
- Suzuki Splash
- Suzuki Swift
- Suzuki SX4 Sedan
- Suzuki SX4 S-Cross
- Suzuki Vitara Brezza

===== Tata Motors =====
- Tata Bolt
- Tata Indica Vista
- Tata Indigo Manza
- Tata Zest

===== Others =====
- DFSK Super Cab (Indonesia)
- Ford Ka (2008)
- Premier Rio

=== 1.6 JTDm/Multijet ===
1.6 L

Overview
- Also called: JTDm (Alfa Romeo); Multijet (Fiat, Jeep and Lancia); CDTI (Opel); DDiS (Suzuki and Maruti Suzuki)
- Production: 2006–present

Layout
- Configuration: Inline-4
- Displacement: 1,598 cc (97.5 cu in)
- Cylinder bore: 79.5 mm (3.13 in)
- Piston stroke: 80.5 mm (3.17 in)

In 2006 Fiat Powertrain announced a downsized version of the 1.9 16V Multijet, a new 1.6L 16V Multijet (1,598 cc) with two power levels of 90 PS (66 kW; 89 hp), 105 PS (77 kW; 104 hp), 120 PS (88 kW; 120 hp) and 130 PS (96 kW; 130 hp) to replace the still-used 1.9L 8-valve engine. The torques are 280 N⋅m (207 lb⋅ft), 290 N⋅m (214 lb⋅ft), 300 N⋅m (221 lb⋅ft) and 320 N⋅m (236 lb⋅ft).

==== Applications ====
===== FCA =====
- Alfa Romeo Mito
- Alfa Romeo Giulietta (2010)
- Alfa Romeo Tonale
- Fiat 500L
- Fiat 500X
- Fiat Bravo (2007)
- Fiat Doblò
- Fiat Punto
- Fiat Idea
- Fiat Linea
- Fiat Tipo (2015)
- Jeep Renegade
- Jeep Compass
- Lancia Delta (2008)
- Lancia Musa

===== General Motors =====
- Opel Combo D

===== Suzuki =====
- Suzuki Vitara (2015)
- Suzuki SX4 S-Cross (from 2013)

=== 1.9 JTD/JTDm/Multijet ===
1.9 L
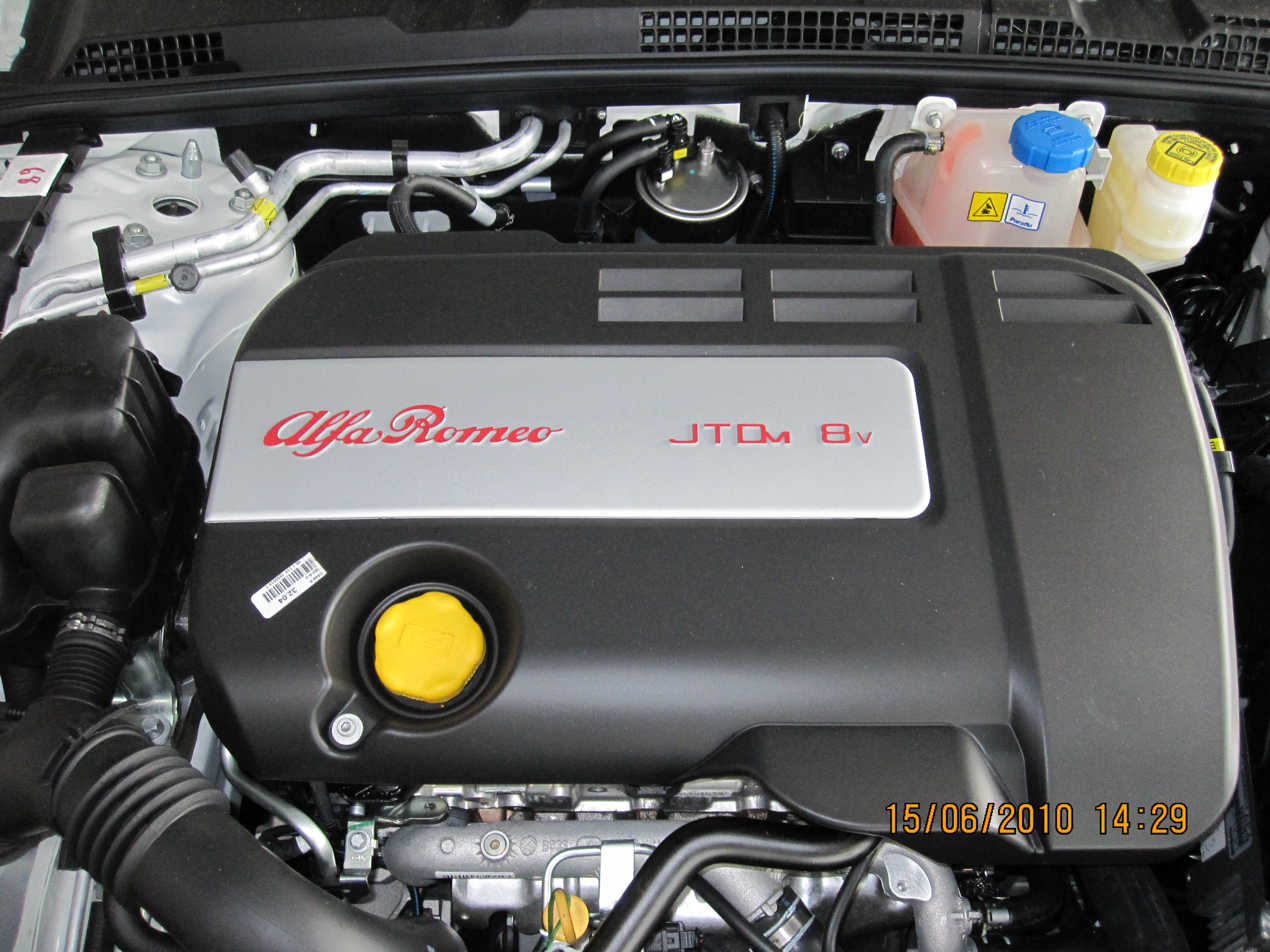
- JTDm engine cover of Alfa Romeo 159

Overview
- Manufacturer: GM Powertrain Torino
- Also called: JTD and JTDm (Alfa Romeo); CDTI (Opel); JTD/Multijet (Fiat and Lancia); Twin Turbo Multijet (Lancia); TiD and TTiD (Saab Automobile and Cadillac); DDiS (Suzuki and Maruti Suzuki)
- Production: 1996–present

Layout
- Configuration: Inline-4
- Displacement: 1,910 cc (117 cu in)
- Cylinder bore: 82 mm (3.2 in)
- Piston stroke: 90.4 mm (3.56 in)
- Compression ratio: 18.5

Combustion
- Turbocharger: Some versions

Dimensions
- Dry weight: 125 kg (276 lb) (Single turbo)

The most common JTD engine is the 1.9 L straight-4 found on various brands and models. The first car that used this engine was the Alfa Romeo 156 in 1997 (105 PS, 77 kW, 104 hp), making it the world's first common-rail diesel passenger car. In 1999, it was introduced in the Fiat Brava, Bravo and Marea range, as well as in the Fiat Punto JTD with a smaller, fixed-geometry turbocharger and 80 PS (59 kW; 79 hp). There were also 85 PS (63 kW; 84 hp), 101 PS (74 kW; 100 hp), 110 PS (81 kW; 108 hp), and 115 PS (85 kW; 113 hp) versions available. The engine block weighs approximately 125 kg (276 lb) and the cylinder head features an overhead camshaft with directly actuated valves. The Multijet second generation features an advanced common-rail system and is available with seven different power outputs. The 8-valve version has 101 PS (74 kW; 100 hp), 120 PS (88 kW; 118 hp), or 130 PS (96 kW; 128 hp) and the 16-valve version has 134 PS (99 kW; 132 hp), 138 PS (101 kW; 136 hp), 150 PS (110 kW; 148 hp), or 170 PS (125 kW; 168 hp). Except for the 101 PS Multijet, all engines feature a variable-geometry turbocharger. Opel also uses a version of this engine. Their CDTI engine, manufactured in Pratola Serra, Italy and Kaiserslautern, Germany, is the product of the half-decade joint venture between GM and Fiat. It is used in the Vectra, Signum, Astra, Zafira, Cadillac BLS and Suzuki SX4 as well as some Saabs marked as TiD and TTiD (twin-turbo version).

==== Applications ====
===== FCA =====
- Alfa Romeo 145
- Alfa Romeo 146
- Alfa Romeo 147
- Alfa Romeo 156
- Alfa Romeo 159
- Alfa Romeo GT
- Fiat Bravo
- Fiat Brava
- Fiat Croma II
- Fiat Doblò
- Fiat Grande Punto
- Fiat Marea
- Fiat Multipla
- Fiat Punto
- Fiat Idea
- Fiat Sedici
- Fiat Stilo
- Fiat Strada
- Lancia Delta
- Lancia Lybra
- Lancia Musa

===== General Motors =====
- Cadillac BLS
- Opel Astra H
- Opel Signum
- Opel Vectra C
- Opel Zafira B
- Saab 9-3
- Saab 9-5

===== Suzuki =====
- Suzuki SX4

===== Others =====
- Alenia Aeronautica Sky-Y
- DR5

===== SAIC Motor =====
- MG 6
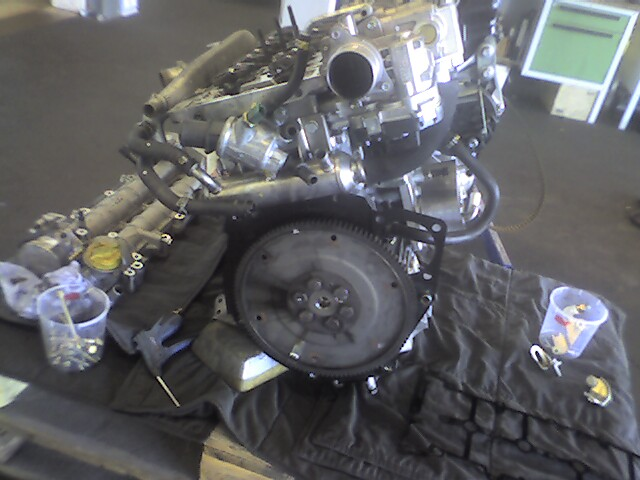
Right side view, from Saab 9-5

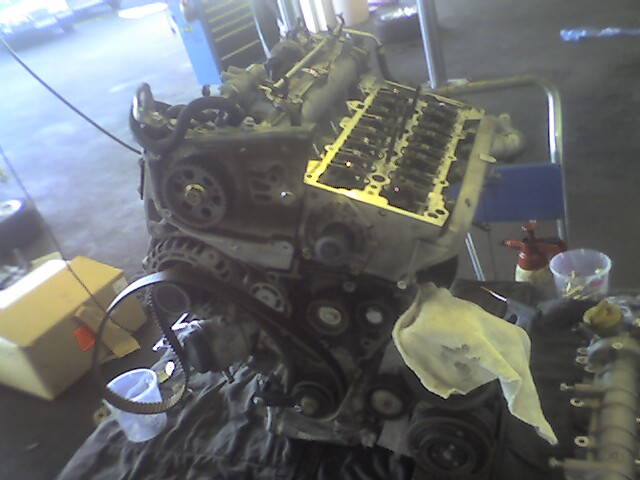
Left side view, from Saab 9-5

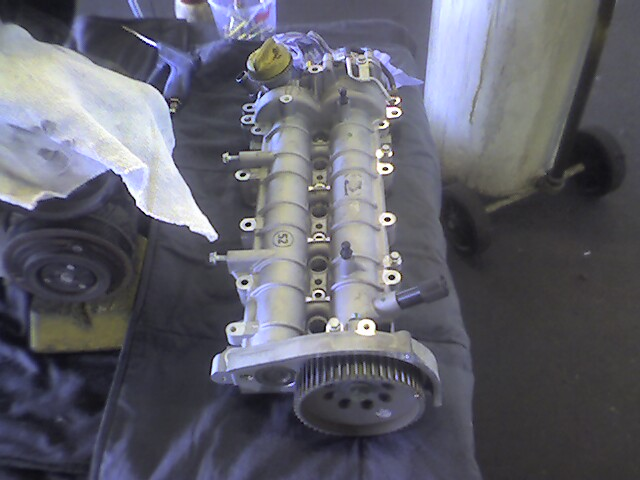
Dual overhead camshaft housing

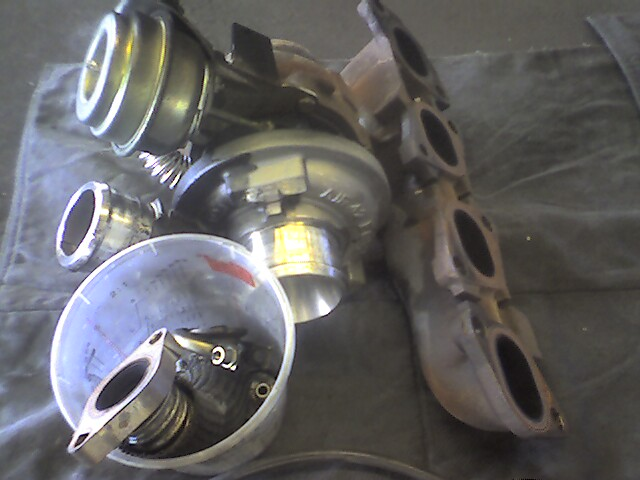
Turbo charger with attachments from 9-5

==== Twin Turbo ====
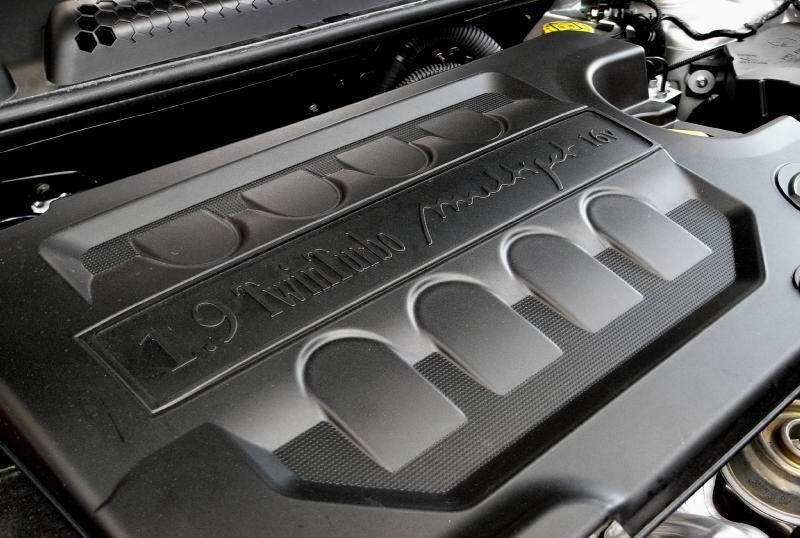
Engine cover of Lancia Delta's 1.9 TT Multijet.

Fiat Powertrain Technologies released information about a new two stage turbo (twin turbo) version of this engine in summer 2007, which is available with two power levels, one producing 180 PS (132 kW; 178 hp) and one 190 PS (140 kW; 187 hp), both with a maximum torque output of 400 N⋅m (295 lb⋅ft) at 2000 rpm. The 180 PS version production started summer 2007. The engine weighs approximately 185 kg (408 lb). This engine will be sold both to Fiat Group Automobiles and other brands, but the 190 PS (140 kW; 187 hp) version is reserved only for Fiat Group Automobiles.

===== Applications =====
- Cadillac BLS
- Lancia Delta
- Saab 9-3

=== 2.0 JTDm/Multijet II ===
2.0 L
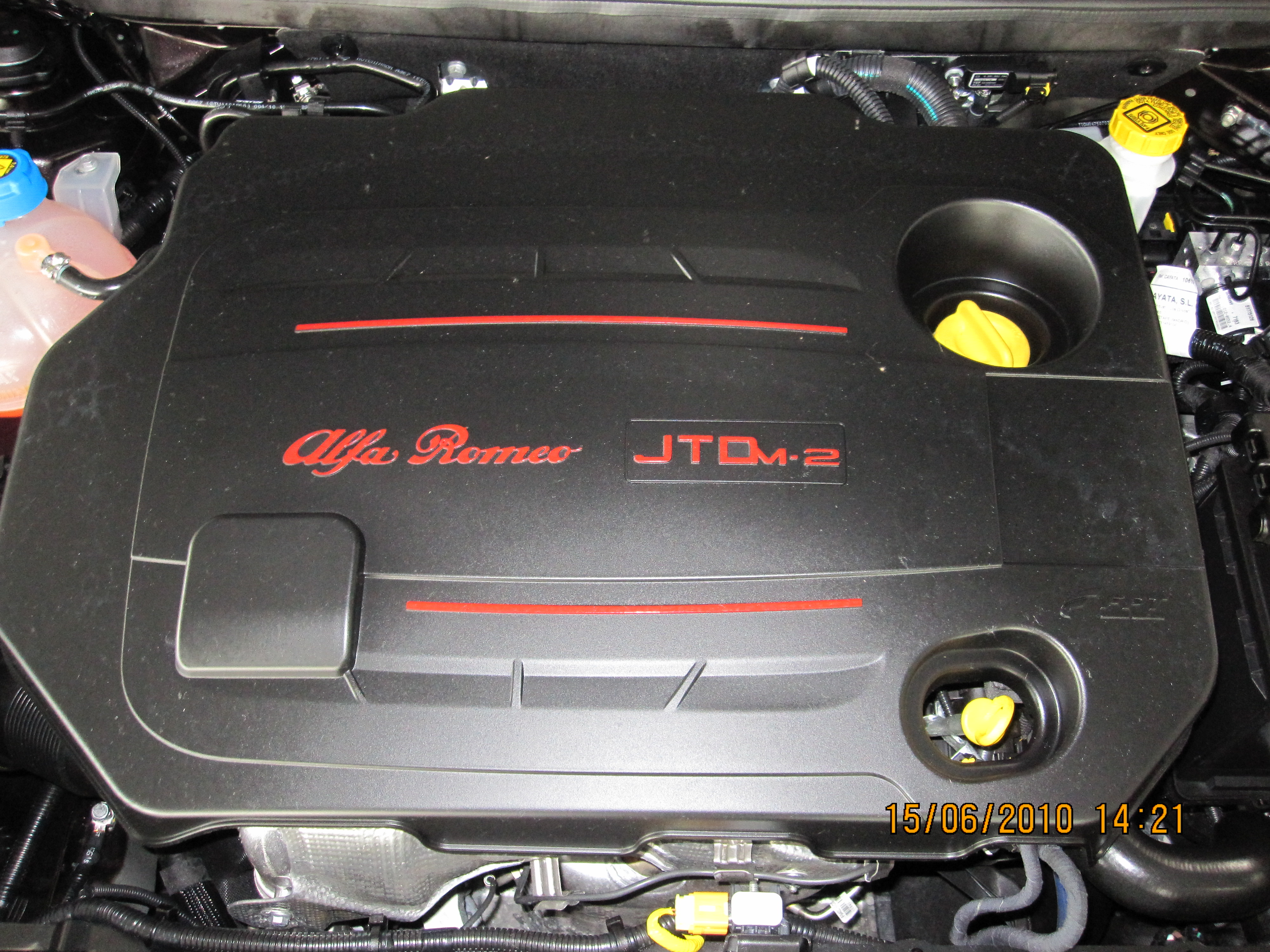
- JTDm 2 engine cover of Alfa Romeo Giulietta

Overview
- Manufacturer: FPT Industrial; GM Powertrain Torino
- Also called: JTDm (Alfa Romeo); CDTI (Opel); TiD or TTiD (Saab); VCDi (Chevrolet); Multijet (Cadillac, Fiat, Jeep and Lancia); DDiS (Suzuki); Kryotec (Tata)
- Production: 2008–present

Layout
- Configuration: Inline-4
- Displacement: 1,956 cc (119.4 cu in)
- Cylinder bore: 83 mm (3.3 in)
- Piston stroke: 90.4 mm (3.56 in)
- Cylinder block material: Cast iron
- Cylinder head material: Aluminum
- Valvetrain: Dual overhead camshafts
- Compression ratio: 16.5

Combustion
- Fuel system: Common rail Direct injection turbo diesel
- Fuel type: Diesel; B20
- Oil system: Wet sump
- Cooling system: Water-cooled

Output
- Power output: 110–192 hp (82–143 kW)
- Torque output: 192–280 lb⋅ft (260–380 N⋅m)

Dimensions
- Dry weight: 174–182 kg (384–401 lb)

A new 2 litre (1,956 cc, 83 mm bore, 90.4 mm stroke) Multijet diesel was introduced in third generation Lancia Delta in summer 2008. Rye first version produced 165 PS (121 kW; 163 hp). For 2009, the engine was fitted to the Alfa Romeo 159 as a 170 PS (125 kW; 168 hp) variant. Fiat Sedici, Suzuki SX4 and the new Fiat Doblò generation use a 135 PS (99 kW; 133 hp) variant of this engine. GM Powertrain separately developed their diesel engines based on 1.9 JTD, after end of the GM and Fiat partnership. First was the 160 PS (118 kW; 158 hp) version for Astra and Insignia, which was later upgraded to 165 PS for Astra (163 PS in restyled version of Insignia), and less powerful versions for Insignia, with 110 PS and 130 PS. In 2011, GM Powertrain Europe developed a new derivative - the twin-turbocharger BiTurbo version, with 195 PS (143 kW; 192 hp), which is used in the Insignia and, starting in 2013, in the Astra J. Internally, the new engine is referred to as GM Ecotec Family B engine. The same engine was also available in the 2011 Saab 9–5 with 160 PS and 190 PS twin-turbo. In 2013, Opel introduced cleaner and more fuel efficient versions of the 2.0 CDTI engine and the ecoFLEX version, with 99 g/km of CO_{2} and 120 PS (140 PS for Insignia).

==== Applications ====
===== FCA =====
- Alfa Romeo Giulietta (2010)
- Alfa Romeo 159
- Fiat Bravo (2007)
- Fiat Doblò
- Fiat Ducato
- Fiat Freemont
- Fiat Sedici
- Fiat Toro
- Fiat 500X
- Jeep Compass
- Jeep Cherokee
- Jeep Commander/Meridian
- Jeep Renegade
- Lancia Delta III

===== General Motors =====
- 2014–2015 Chevrolet Cruze (NA)
- 2016-2017 Chevrolet Captiva (KOR)
- 2013-2015 Chevrolet Malibu
- Daewoo Lacetti
- Opel Antara
- Opel Astra J (single and twin turbo)
- Opel Cascada (single and twin turbo)
- Opel Insignia (single and twin turbo)
- Opel Zafira Tourer (single and twin turbo)
- Saab 9-5 (single and twin turbo)
- 2020 Cadillac XT4 (EU market)

===== SAIC Motor =====
- MG Hector

===== Suzuki =====
- Suzuki SX4

===== Tata Motors =====
- Tata Harrier
- Tata Safari

=== 2.2 JTDm/Multijet II ===
2.2 L
- 2.2 JTDm/Multijet II in the Alfa Romeo Giulia

Overview
- Manufacturer: CNH Industrial
- Also called: Multijet II (Fiat and Jeep); JTDm (Alfa Romeo)
- Production: 2015-current

Layout
- Configuration: Inline-4
- Displacement: 2,143 cc (130.8 cu in); 2,184 cc (133.3 cu in)
- Cylinder bore: 83 mm (3.27 in); 83.8 mm (3.30 in)
- Piston stroke: 99 mm (3.90 in)
- Cylinder block material: Cast iron (die-cast Aluminium for Alfa Romeo)
- Cylinder head material: Aluminum
- Valvetrain: Dual overhead camshafts
- Compression ratio: 15.5:1

Combustion
- Turbocharger: Variable-geometry integrated in the exhaust manifold
- Fuel system: Common Rail
- Management: Multijet II (Magneti Marelli)

Output
- Power output: 185–210 PS (136–154 kW; 182–207 hp)
- Torque output: 440–470 N⋅m (320–350 lb⋅ft)

Dimensions
- Dry weight: 158 kg (348 lb)

The 2.2 Multijet II (2,184 cc) was introduced by Fiat Chrysler in mid-2015. These engines produce 185 or 200 PS (136 or 147 kW; 182 or 197 hp) with 440 N⋅m (325 lb⋅ft) of torque at 2500 rpm in the Jeep Cherokee. It is a member of Fiat's Pratola Serra modular engine family and was developed to offer more torque in the low-rev range compared to the 2.0L Multijet. This engine further improves the existing 2.0 Multijet in various areas, such as a higher injection pressure (2,000 Bar instead of 1,600 Bar) with Injector Rate Shaping, an oil pump with variable displacement and counterbalance-shafts to reduce noises and vibrations. This engine meets Euro 6 emission norms without the use of diesel exhaust fluid injection. A 2.2 Multijet III (2,184 cc) was introduced by Stellantis on the Fiat Ducato in 2021 with 4 power outputs: 120, 140, 160, & 180 hp. It also meets Euro 6 emissions standards.

A further development of this engine with a 2,143 cc displacement, and a die-cast Aluminium block, is used in the Alfa Romeo Giulia (952), Alfa Romeo Stelvio, and Jeep Wrangler (JL).

Announced in 2023, a new version of the 2.2 Multijet Evo (2,184 cc) four-cylinder engine (code B2.2) entered production in 2024 and was Euro 7 approved in 2025. This engine, produced in the Pratola Serra (Avellino) factory, is mounted on the Fiat Ducato (and twins Opel Movano, Citroën Jumper, Peugeot Boxer and Toyota Proace Max), Peugeot Landtrek, Fiat Titano, RAM Rampage, Fiat Toro, Jeep Compass and Jeep Commander (in Brazil). The South American version was Proconve L8 homologated.

From 2025, the 2.2 Multijet Evo engine was also adopted by the K0 family of commercial vehicles (Peugeot Expert, Fiat Scudo/Ulysse, Citroën Jumpy, Opel Vivaro/Zafira Life, Toyota Proace/Proace Verso), replacing the previous 1.5 HDI and 2.0 HDI engines of PSA origin.

==== Applications ====
2,143 cc aluminium block

- Alfa Romeo Giulia (952)
- Alfa Romeo Stelvio (949)
- Jeep Wrangler (JL)

2,184 cc cast-iron block

- Fiat Ducato and Peugeot/Opel/Citroën twins
- Fiat Scudo and other K0 twins
- Fiat Toro
- Jeep Cherokee (KL)
- Jeep Compass (Brasil)
- Jeep Commander (Brasil)
- Ram Rampage
- Peugeot Landtrek

=== 2.4 JTD/JTDm/Multijet ===
2.4 L
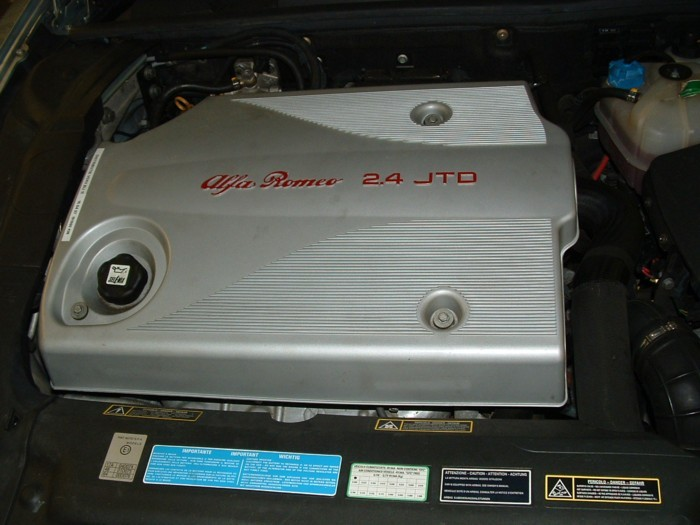
- Engine cover of an Alfa Romeo 166 2.4 JTD

Overview
- Manufacturer: Fiat S.p.A.
- Also called: JTD and Multijet (Fiat and Lancia); JTD and JTDm (Alfa Romeo)

Layout
- Configuration: Inline-5
- Displacement: 2,387 cc (145.7 cu in)
- Cylinder bore: 82 mm (3.2 in)
- Piston stroke: 90.4 mm (3.56 in)
- Cylinder block material: Cast iron
- Valvetrain: OHC/DOHC
- Compression ratio: 18,5

Combustion
- Fuel system: Direct injection
- Management: Bosch EDC15 Diesel Injection

The 2.4 L (2,387 cc) straight-5 version is based on the 2.4 124 PS (91 kW; 122 hp) 5 cylinder TD engine as used in the Mk1 Fiat Marea and the Mk1 Lancia Kappa. The JTD version benefits from the solid build of the TD block, and an improved head/injection system. There are 2 versions of the 2.4 JTD, the 10-valve as used in the Fiat Marea 130 JTD and the earlier Alfa Romeo 156/Alfa Romeo 166/Lancia Lybra diesels where it was available as 136 PS (100 kW; 134 hp), 140 PS (103 kW; 138 hp), 150 PS (110 kW; 148 hp) and later a Multijet 20-valve version 175 PS (129 kW; 173 hp) as used in the 2003 and later Alfa Romeo 156 as well as some Lancia vehicles. It was designed for transverse front-wheel drive use and was deemed too long and tall for widespread use in other GM Ecotec or Fiat products. A newer Multijet variant of this engine, capable of 200 PS (147 kW; 197 hp), is used in the Alfa Romeo 159, Alfa Romeo Brera and Fiat Croma. The latest version of this engine produces 210 PS (154 kW; 207 hp) and 400 N⋅m (295 lb⋅ft) at 1500 rpm, and is used in Alfa Romeo vehicles.

==== Applications ====
- Alfa Romeo 156
- Alfa Romeo Spider
- Alfa Romeo Brera
- Alfa Romeo 159
- Alfa Romeo 166
- Fiat Croma II
- Fiat Marea
- Lancia Kappa
- Lancia Lybra
- Lancia Thesis

=== 2.8 Multijet ===
2.8 Multijet

Overview
- Manufacturer: VM Motori
- Also called: 2.8 Multijet
- Production: 2009–2016

Layout
- Configuration: 60° inline-4
- Displacement: 2.8 L (2,766 cc; 168.8 cu in)
- Cylinder bore: 94 mm (3.70 in)
- Piston stroke: 100 mm (3.94 in)
- Cylinder block material: Compacted graphite iron
- Cylinder head material: Aluminum
- Valvetrain: DOHC 4 valves x cyl.
- Compression ratio: 15.5:1

Combustion
- Turbocharger: Honeywell VGT 2056
- Fuel system: Common rail Direct injection
- Fuel type: Diesel, B20
- Oil system: Wet sump
- Cooling system: Water-cooled

Output
- Power output: 163–178 PS (120–131 kW; 161–176 hp)
- Torque output: 360 N⋅m (266 lb⋅ft)

Dimensions
- Length: 695 mm (27.4 in)
- Width: 729 mm (28.7 in)
- Height: 697.5 mm (27.46 in)
- Dry weight: 220 kg (485 lb)

The evolution of VM Motori A 428 DOHC in the inline-4 engine, with 1,800 bars (26,000 psi) common rail injection system and piezoelectric injectors

==== Applications ====
- 2011–2013 Lancia Voyager power: 163 PS (120 kW; 161 hp); torque: 360 N⋅m (266 lb⋅ft)
- 2013–2016 Lancia Voyager power: 178 PS (131 kW; 176 hp); torque: 360 N⋅m (266 lb⋅ft)

=== 3.0 Multijet ===
3.0 Multijet

Overview
- Manufacturer: VM Motori
- Also called: 3.0 V6 Multijet II
- Production: 2011–2023

Layout
- Configuration: 60° V6
- Displacement: 3.0 L; 182.3 cu in (2,987 cc)
- Cylinder bore: 83 mm (3.27 in)
- Piston stroke: 92 mm (3.62 in)
- Cylinder block material: Compacted graphite iron
- Cylinder head material: Aluminum
- Valvetrain: DOHC 4 valves x cyl.
- Compression ratio: 15.5:1

Combustion
- Turbocharger: Honeywell VGT 2056
- Fuel system: Common rail Direct injection
- Fuel type: Diesel, B20
- Oil system: Wet sump
- Cooling system: Water-cooled

Output
- Power output: 190–275 PS (140–202 kW; 187–271 hp)
- Torque output: 440–600 N⋅m (325–443 lb⋅ft)

Dimensions
- Length: 695 mm (27.4 in)
- Width: 729 mm (28.7 in)
- Height: 697.5 mm (27.5 in)
- Dry weight: 220 kg (485 lb)

A 3.0 L; 182.3 cu in (2,987 cc) double overhead camshaft V6 engine, featuring four valves-per-cylinder and common-rail direct fuel injection. A variant complying with the emission norms of the North America market (NAFTA) is the 3.0 V6 Multijet II and marketed by Fiat Chrysler as the FPT Multijet II. The high-performance, single turbo version is Jeep.

==== A630 applications (Europe) ====
- 2011 Jeep Grand Cherokee (Also Australia)
  - power 241 PS (177 kW; 238 hp), torque 550 N⋅m (406 lb⋅ft)
- 2012 Lancia Thema
  - power 190 PS (140 kW; 187 hp) @ 4000 rpm, torque 440 N⋅m (325 lb⋅ft) @ 1600-2800 rpm
  - power 239 PS (176 kW; 236 hp) @ 4000 rpm, torque 550 N⋅m (406 lb⋅ft) @ 1800-2800 rpm
- 2014 Jeep Grand Cherokee (FPT Multijet II)
  - power 250 PS (184 kW; 247 hp) @ 4000 rpm, torque 570 N⋅m (420 lb⋅ft) @ 2000 rpm

==== L630 applications (North America) ====
- 2021–2023 Jeep Gladiator Branded as EcoDiesel
  - power 264 PS (194 kW; 260 hp) @ 3600 rpm, torque 600 N⋅m (443 lb⋅ft) @ 2000 rpm
- 2014–2019 Jeep Grand Cherokee Branded as EcoDiesel
  - power 243 PS (179 kW; 240 hp) @ 3600 rpm, torque 570 N⋅m (420 lb⋅ft) @ 2000 rpm
- 2020–2023 Jeep Wrangler Branded as EcoDiesel
  - power 264 PS (194 kW; 260 hp) @ 3600 rpm, torque 600 N⋅m (443 lb⋅ft) @ 2000 rpm
- 2014–2018 Ram 1500 Branded as EcoDiesel
  - power 243 PS (179 kW; 240 hp) @ 3600 rpm, torque 570 N⋅m (420 lb⋅ft) @ 2000 rpm
- 2019–2023 Ram 1500 Branded as EcoDiesel
  - power 264 PS (194 kW; 260 hp) @ 3600 rpm, torque 650 N⋅m (479 lb⋅ft) @ 2000 rpm

==== A630 HP applications (Europe) ====
- 2013 Maserati Ghibli III
  - power 275 PS (202 kW; 271 hp) @ 4000 rpm, torque 600 N⋅m (443 lb⋅ft) @ 2000 rpm
- 2013 Maserati Quattroporte VI
  - power 275 PS (202 kW; 271 hp) @ 4000 rpm, torque 600 N⋅m (443 lb⋅ft) @ 2000-2600 rpm
- 2016 Maserati Levante
  - power 250 PS (184 kW; 247 hp) @ 4000 rpm, torque 600 N⋅m (443 lb⋅ft) @ 2000-2600 rpm
  - power 275 PS (202 kW; 271 hp) @ 4000 rpm, torque 600 N⋅m (443 lb⋅ft) @ 2000-2600 rpm

== Light commercial vehicle engines ==
=== 1.5 Multijet II ===
1.5 L

Overview
- Manufacturer: Groupe PSA, Ford of Europe
- Also called: Multijet II (Fiat)

Layout
- Configuration: Inline-4
- Displacement: 1,499 cc (91.5 cu in)
- Cylinder bore: 79.5 mm (3.13 in)
- Piston stroke: 80.5 mm (3.17 in)

The Multijet II engine is a 1.5 L (1,499 cc) inline-four found on various brands and models. Versions of this engine include the PSA DV5 in the third generation Fiat Doblò and third generation Fiat Scudo. Power outputs are 100 PS (74 kW; 99 hp), 120 and 130 PS (88 and 96 kW; 118 and 128 hp) with maximum torque output of 250 N⋅m (180 lb⋅ft) or 300 N⋅m (220 lb⋅ft) at 2000 rpm. The PSA HDi engine variant is manufactured by Groupe PSA as a product of the joint venture with Stellantis.

==== Applications ====
===== Fiat =====
- Fiat Doblò
- Fiat Scudo

=== 1.6 Multijet II ===
1.6 L

Overview
- Manufacturer: Groupe PSA, Ford of Europe
- Also called: JTD and Multijet (Fiat S.p.A.)

Layout
- Configuration: Inline-4
- Displacement: 1,560 cc (95 cu in)

The 1.6 Multijet II (1560 cc) was developed by PSA HDi engine and Ford Duratorq engine for heavy-duty applications and is available in three versions 90 Multijet (PSA DV6) these engines produce 90 PS (66 kW; 89 hp) respectively.

==== Applications ====
- Fiat Scudo

=== 2.0 JTD/Multijet ===
2.0 L

Overview
- Manufacturer: Groupe PSA
- Also called: JTD and Multijet (Fiat and Lancia)

Layout
- Configuration: Inline-4
- Displacement: 1,998 cc (121.9 cu in)

The 2.0 JTD/Multijet (1998 cc) was developed by PSA HDi engine for heavy-duty applications and is available in three versions: 90 JTD (PSA DW10), 110 JTD (PSA DW10), 120 MultiJet (PSA DW10), 136 MultiJet (PSA DW10), 150 MultiJet (PSA DW10) and 180 MultiJet (PSA DW10). These engines produce 90 PS (66 kW; 89 hp), 110 PS (81 kW; 108 hp), 120 PS (88 kW; 118 hp), 136 PS (100 kW; 134 hp), 150 PS (110 kW; 148 hp) and 180 PS (132 kW; 178 hp) respectively.

==== Applications ====
- Fiat Ulysse
- Fiat Scudo
- Lancia Zeta
- Lancia Phedra

=== 2.3 JTD/Multijet ===
2.3 L

Overview
- Manufacturer: Sofim
- Also called: JTD and Multijet (Fiat)

Layout
- Configuration: Inline-4
- Displacement: 2,287 cc (139.6 cu in)

The 2.3 Multijet (2,287 cc) was developed by Iveco for heavy-duty applications and is available in three versions: 120 MultiJet (Sofim F1AE0481D), 130 MultiJet (Sofim F1AE0481N or F1AE6481D) and 150 MultiJet (Sofim F1AE3481E). These engines produce 120 PS (88 kW; 118 hp), 130 PS (96 kW; 128 hp) and 148 PS (109 kW; 146 hp) respectively.

==== Applications ====
- Fiat Ducato
- Iveco Daily
- Karsan Jest
- UAZ Patriot

=== 2.4 Multijet ===
2.4 L

Overview
- Manufacturer: Mitsubishi Motors
- Also called: Multijet (Fiat)

Layout
- Configuration: Inline-4
- Displacement: 2,442 cc (149.0 cu in)

The 2.4 Multijet (2,442 cc) was developed by Mitsubishi 4N15 for Mitsubishi L200 applications and is available in three versions: these engines produce 154 PS (113 kW; 152 hp) and 181 PS (133 kW; 179 hp) respectively.

==== Applications ====
- Fiat Fullback

=== 2.8 JTD/HDi ===
2.8 L

Overview
- Manufacturer: Sofim
- Also called: JTD (Fiat and Iveco); HDi (Peugeot and Citroen)

Layout
- Configuration: Inline-4
- Displacement: 2,800 cc (170 cu in)

The 2.8 JTD (2,800 cc) made by Iveco (SOFIM) was used in second generation Fiat Ducato, it produces 128 PS (94 kW; 126 hp) or 146 PS (107 kW; 144 hp).

==== Applications ====
- Citroën Jumper
- Fiat Ducato
- Iveco Daily
- Iveco Massif
- Peugeot Boxer
- Renault Mascott

=== 3.0 Multijet Power/HDi ===
3.0 L

Overview
- Manufacturer: Sofim
- Also called: Multijet Power (Fiat and Iveco); HDi (Citroen)

Layout
- Configuration: Inline-4
- Displacement: 2,998 cc (182.9 cu in)

The 160 MultiJet Power, introduced in 2007, saw displacement increased to 3.0 L (2,998 cc). This engine produces 157 PS (115 kW; 155 hp) or 177 PS (130 kW; 175 hp) in Fiat-badged models. In Iveco Massif, this engine is also available as a 176 PS (129 kW; 174 hp) version.

==== Applications ====
- Citroën Jumper
- Fiat Ducato
- Iveco Daily
- Iveco Massif/Campagnola
- Mitsubishi Canter
- Multicar Fumo
- Peugeot Boxer
- RAM ProMaster
- TEMSA Prestij
- Karsan Jestronic

== See also ==
- Fully Integrated Robotised Engine
- Fiat Global Small Engine
- Fiat Pratola Serra modular engines
