= Circle L engine =

Overview
- Manufacturer: GM Powertrain Poland
- Also called: Isuzu 4EE2

Layout
- Configuration: Inline-4
- Displacement: 1.7 L (1,686 cc; 102.9 cu in)
- Cylinder bore: 79 mm (3.11 in)
- Piston stroke: 86 mm (3.39 in)
- Cylinder head material: Aluminium alloy
- Valvetrain: DOHC
- Compression ratio: 16.5:1, 18.2:1, 18.4:1

Combustion
- Turbocharger: Mitsubishi TD025 variable-geometry
- Fuel system: Common rail direct injection
- Management: Denso or Bosch
- Fuel type: Diesel
- Oil system: Wet sump
- Cooling system: Water-cooled

Output
- Power output: 65–130 PS (48–96 kW)
- Torque output: 130–300 N⋅m (96–221 lb⋅ft)

Emissions
- Emissions target standard: Euro 3, 4 & 5
- Emissions control systems: EGR

Chronology
- Successor: MDE engine

The Circle L, originally the Isuzu 4EE2, is an automobile engine produced by GM Powertrain Poland in Poland. It is a 1.7 L (1,686 cc; 102.9 cu in) inline-four 16-valve turbocharged diesel engine designed by Isuzu as part of their E-family of compact diesel engines. The engine was produced in Tychy, Poland by Isuzu Motors Polska (later GM Powertrain Poland) for use in Opel, Vauxhall, Chevrolet, and Honda vehicles.

== History ==
In the late nineties the Japanese company Isuzu, which was known for the efficiency of its diesel engines, collaborated with General Motors on a new diesel engine for the European market for Opel and Vauxhall. For this purpose it opened a new plant in the city of Tychy, in Poland, called Isuzu Motor Polska. The engine blocks were supplied from Japan. By May 2004, after about five years in production, Isuzu Motors Polska had built one million 4EE2 engines.

At the time the engine was developed, GM owned a 49% share of Isuzu, but later dissolved its stake and reacquired a 12% share for US$80 million in exchange for exclusive rights to what they named the Circle L engine.

== Characteristics ==
For reasons of economy, GM and Isuzu chose not to make an engine from scratch, but rather evolved the new engine from an existing base. Thus, the Isuzu 4EE1 1.7-liter was chosen and developed into the 4EE2 engine, later renamed the "Circle L" family of engines after General Motors took over the rights to the design.

The engine kept the dimensions of the 1.7 4EE1. The main differences are in the DOHC camshafts and direct injection. The first engines mounted a simple direct injection and met the Euro 3 standard, while the later engines met Euro 4 and used common rail injection technology. The 1.7 Circle L common rail engines were the first common rail engines used in Opels.

60 percent of the components for the production of the engines at Isuzu Motor Polska come from Germany, as well as the aluminium alloy for the manufacture of the cylinder head. The Polish plant was responsible for the construction and the development of the valvetrain. The block, however, arrived in Tychy already built by the Isuzu factory in Hokkaido, Japan.

=== 4EE2 ===
The 4EE2 produces 75 PS (55 kW; 74 hp) at 4400 rpm and 165 N⋅m (122 lb⋅ft) at 1800 rpm.

Applications:

- Opel Corsa
- Opel Meriva
- Opel Astra
- Opel Zafira
- Opel Vectra
- Cummins MerCruiser Recreational Sterndrive, Inboard or Jet (Boat Engine)

== Circle L (Y17) ==
These engines were particularly important for Opel since they were fitted to their best-selling models in a period in which diesel engines became extremely popular. The Circle L engines were then integrated into the Ecotec family of engines, later becoming part of the Ecoflex family.

The 1.7-liter engine was offered in six main variants by Opel/Vauxhall, whose characteristics and applications are described below.

=== Y17DT ===
The abbreviation Y17DT identifies the first 4EE2 engine when installed in Opels; it is a Euro 3 engine with a compression ratio of 18.4:1. The unit has Denso engine management, as in most Circle L engines. A Mitsubishi TD025 turbocharger is fitted, as is an exhaust gas recirculation system. The Y17DT reaches 75 PS (55 kW; 74 hp) at 4400 rpm, with a torque of 165 N⋅m (122 lb⋅ft) between 1800 and 3000 rpm. This engine was fitted in:

- Opel Corsa C 1.7 DTI 16V 75 HP (2000-03);
- Opel Combo C 1.7 DTI 16V (2002-04);
- Opel Astra G 1.7 DTI 16V (1999-2003);
- Opel Meriva 1.7 16V DTI (2003-05);

=== Y17DTL ===
The engine Y17DTL is a reduced power variant of the Y17DT, to which it differs in the absence of an intercooler. Maximum power is reduced to 65 PS (48 kW; 64 hp) at 4400 rpm, and maximum torque to 130 N⋅m (96 lb⋅ft) between 2000 and 3000 rpm. This engine, also Euro 3, was fitted in:

- Opel Corsa C 1.7 16V 65 HP (2000-03);
- Opel Combo C 1.7 DI 16V (2002-04);

=== Z17DTL ===
The engine Z17DTL was one of the first common rail turbo-diesel engines used as a "CDTi" badge by Opel. With a turbocharger and a compression ratio of 18.4:1, it can reach the maximum power of 80 PS (59 kW; 79 hp) at 4400 rpm, with a maximum torque of 170 N⋅m (125 lb⋅ft) at 1800 rpm. It was fitted in:

- Opel Astra G 1.7 16V CDTI (2003-04)
- Opel Astra H 1.7 CDTI (2004- 05)

=== Z17DT ===
The engine Z17DT was one of the first common rail turbo diesel engines used as a "CDTi" badge by Opel. With a variable-geometry turbocharger and a compression ratio of 18.4:1, can reach the maximum power of 101 PS (74 kW; 100 hp) at 4400 rpm, with a maximum torque of 240 N⋅m (177 lb⋅ft) at 2300 rpm. It was fitted in:

- Opel Corsa C 1.7 16V CDTI 101CV (2003-06);
- Opel Meriva A 1.7 CDTi 16v 101CV (2003-05);

This engine meets the Euro 4 directive.

=== Z17DTH and A17DT ===
This motor is similar to the one signed Z17DT it replaces, and features a number of minor improvements. The power is unchanged at 101 PS (74 kW; 100 hp) at 4400 rpm, but the torque increases to 260 N⋅m (192 lb⋅ft) at 2300 rpm. It was fitted in

- Opel Meriva A 1.7 CDTI A (2005-10),
- Opel Astra H 1.7 CDTI (2004-08),
- Opel Combo C 1.7 CDTI (2004-2010).
- Opel Corsa C 1.7 CDTI (2003-06)

With the exception of the Opel Astra 1.7 CDTI 16V, this car had a Bosch engine management system, and the other four models are equipped with a Denso control unit. In more modern versions, introduced in 2010, this engine delivers 100 PS (74 kW; 99 hp) of maximum power at 4000 rpm, while maximum torque is always 260 N⋅m (192 lb⋅ft), but delivered between 1,700 and 2,550 rpm. In this configuration, this engine has been fitted to:

- Opel Meriva B 1.7 CDTI (2010-13)

=== Z17DTR and A17DTR ===
These are more powerful variants (but not the most powerful) of the Circle L engines. They also meet the Euro 4 standard, but feature a slightly lower compression ratio of 18.2:1. As in all Euro 4 engine an exhaust gas recirculation system is present. The maximum power reaches 125 PS (92 kW; 123 hp) at 4000 rpm, with a peak torque of 280 N⋅m (207 lb⋅ft) between 2000 and 2700 rpm.

This engine was fitted in:

- Opel Corsa D 1.7 CDTI 16V 125hp (2006-11);
- Opel Corsa D GSi 1.7 CDTI ( 2007 -11);
- Opel Meriva 1.7 CDTI 16V 125hp (2006-10);
- Opel Astra 1.7 16V 5p CDTI 125hp (2007-09);
- Opel Astra H SW 1.7 CDTI 16V 125hp (2007-10);
- Opel Astra GTC 1.7 CDTI 16V 125hp (2007- 11 ).

The abbreviation A17DTR identifies the Euro 5 variant, which has otherwise identical features and is fitted in:

- Opel Zafira B 1.7 CDTI 16V 125hp ( 2009 -14);
- Opel Astra J 1.7 CDTI 125hp (2010-11).

=== A17DTS ===
In 2010 the engine A17DTR was developed into the A17DTS: here the engine power has been increased to 130 PS (96 kW; 128 hp) at 4000 rpm, while the maximum torque is increased to 300 N⋅m (221 lb⋅ft) between 2000 and 2500 rpm. This variant has been fitted in:

- Opel Corsa D 1.7 CDTI (2011-13);
- Opel Astra J 1.7 CDTI 130cv (2011-14);
- Opel Meriva B 1.7 CDTI 130cv (2010-13);
- Opel Mokka 1.7 CDTI ( 2012 -15);
- Chevrolet Cruze 1.7 VCDi (2012-14);
- Chevrolet Trax 1.7 D ( 2013 - 15 ).

=== Z17DTJ and A17DTJ ===
This engine was the basis for the 1.7 Ecoflex: Maximum power reaches 110 PS (81 kW; 108 hp) at 3800 rpm, with a maximum torque of 260 N⋅m (192 lb⋅ft) at 2000 rpm.

It is fitted in:

- Opel Astra H 1.7 CDTI 16v 110 bhp (2007-09);
- Opel Astra J 1.7 CDTI 16v 110 bhp (2010-15);
- Opel Astra GTC H / SW 1.7 CDTI 16v 110 bhp (2007-10 );
- Opel Zafira B 1.7 CDTi 16v 110HP (2007-08).

=== A17DTC and A17DTE ===
This is the second diesel engine in the Opel engine range to be included in the EcoFlex range (the first was a 1.3 Multijet engine from Fiat). Introduced in 2008, is based on the Z17DTJ engine developed simultaneously, and is characterized by a reduction of friction of the moving parts in order to optimize the thermal efficiency and meet the stricter Euro 5 standard. Outputs are identical to those of the Z17DTJ. It is fitted in:

- Opel Meriva B 1.7 CDTi 16v 110HP (from 2010);
- Opel Zafira B 1.7 CDTi 16v 110HP (2008-14);
- Opel Astra J 1.7 CDTI 16v 110HP (2010-14).

== Honda ==
The Honda version features high-pressure common rail direct injection, while Opel's 4EE2 unit uses low-pressure DI. Honda's purchase of Isuzu engines was reciprocated by GM's purchase of the J35A3 V6. As per Honda, who called this engine CTDi, certain Honda parts were used, such as the "fuel filter and accelerator position sensor." Maximum power is 100 PS (74 kW; 99 hp) at 4400 rpm, with torque of 220 N⋅m (162 lb⋅ft) at 1800 rpm. Only used in the Civic for the European market, the engines were built by Isuzu Motors Polska in their Polish plant.

Applications:

- Honda Civic (seventh generation) (Europe)

== See also ==
- List of GM engines
- DMAX
- Honda N series diesel engine
