= Opel OHC engine =

Opel OHC engine can refer to the following diesel and petrol engines produced by General Motors:

- GM Family 0 engine – straight-4 engines produced by Adam Opel AG
- GM Family 1 engine – straight-4 engines produced by Adam Opel AG
- GM Family II engine – straight-4 engines produced by Adam Opel AG
