= Opel Mokka =

Subcompact crossover SUV

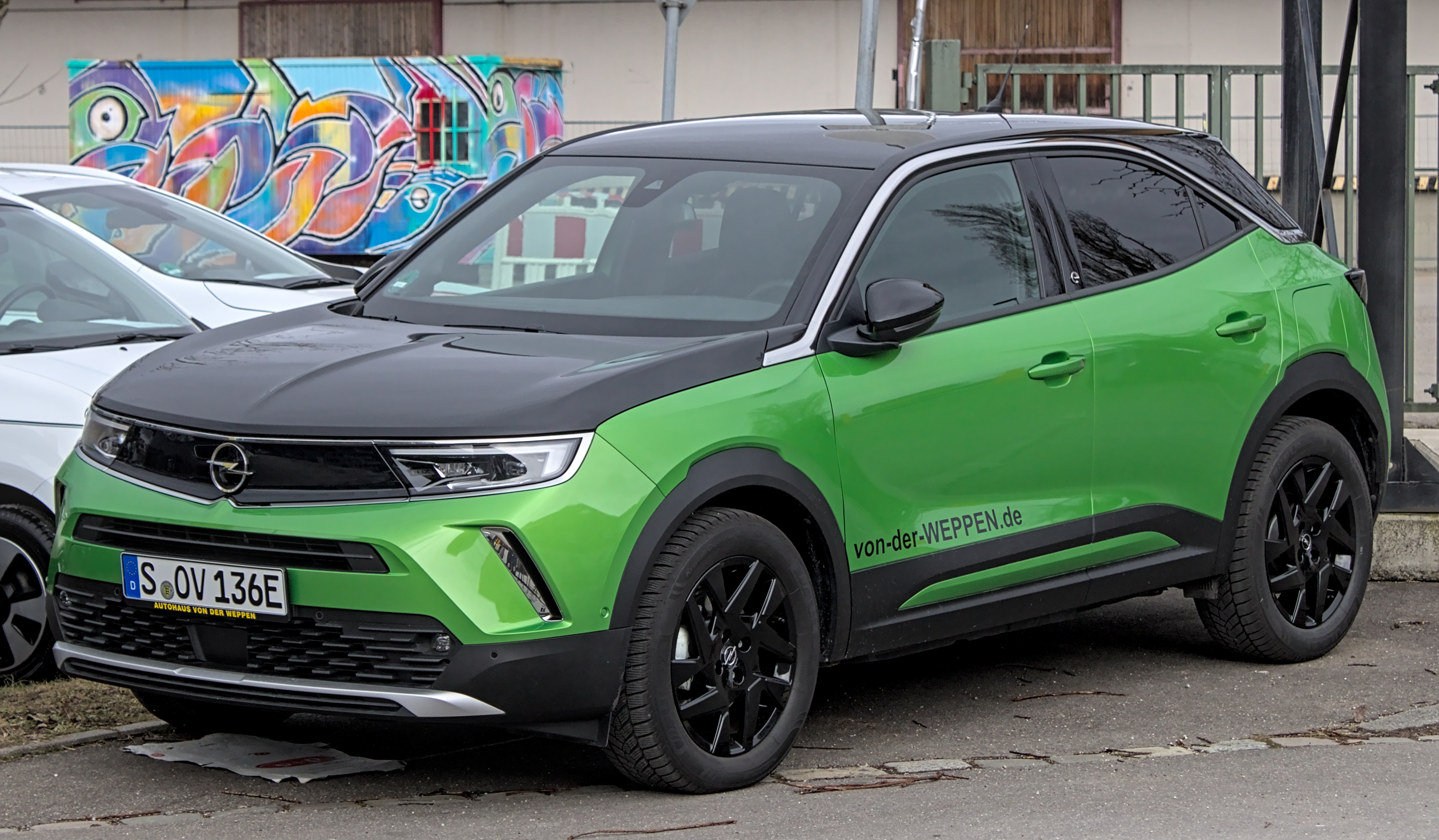

Overview
- Manufacturer: General Motors (Opel Mokka A); Stellantis (Opel Mokka B)
- Production: 2012–present

Body and chassis
- Class: Subcompact crossover SUV (B)
- Body style: 5-door SUV

The Opel Mokka is a subcompact crossover SUV that has been produced by German automaker Opel since 2012. Sales began with the model year of 2013, at the end of 2012. The first generation was developed by GM Korea as the Buick Encore. The facelifted Opel Mokka was marketed as the Mokka X, before reverting to Mokka for the second generation. It is also sold under the Vauxhall brand in the United Kingdom. The Chevrolet Trax that is sold in North America, Australia and South America was also derived from the Buick Encore but the lines diverged after Opel became part of Stellantis.

The second generation Mokka was launched in 2020 after a brief hiatus. It marked the switch to PSA platform, after the acquisition of Opel and Vauxhall brands in 2017.

== Mokka A (J13; 2012) ==
Mokka A
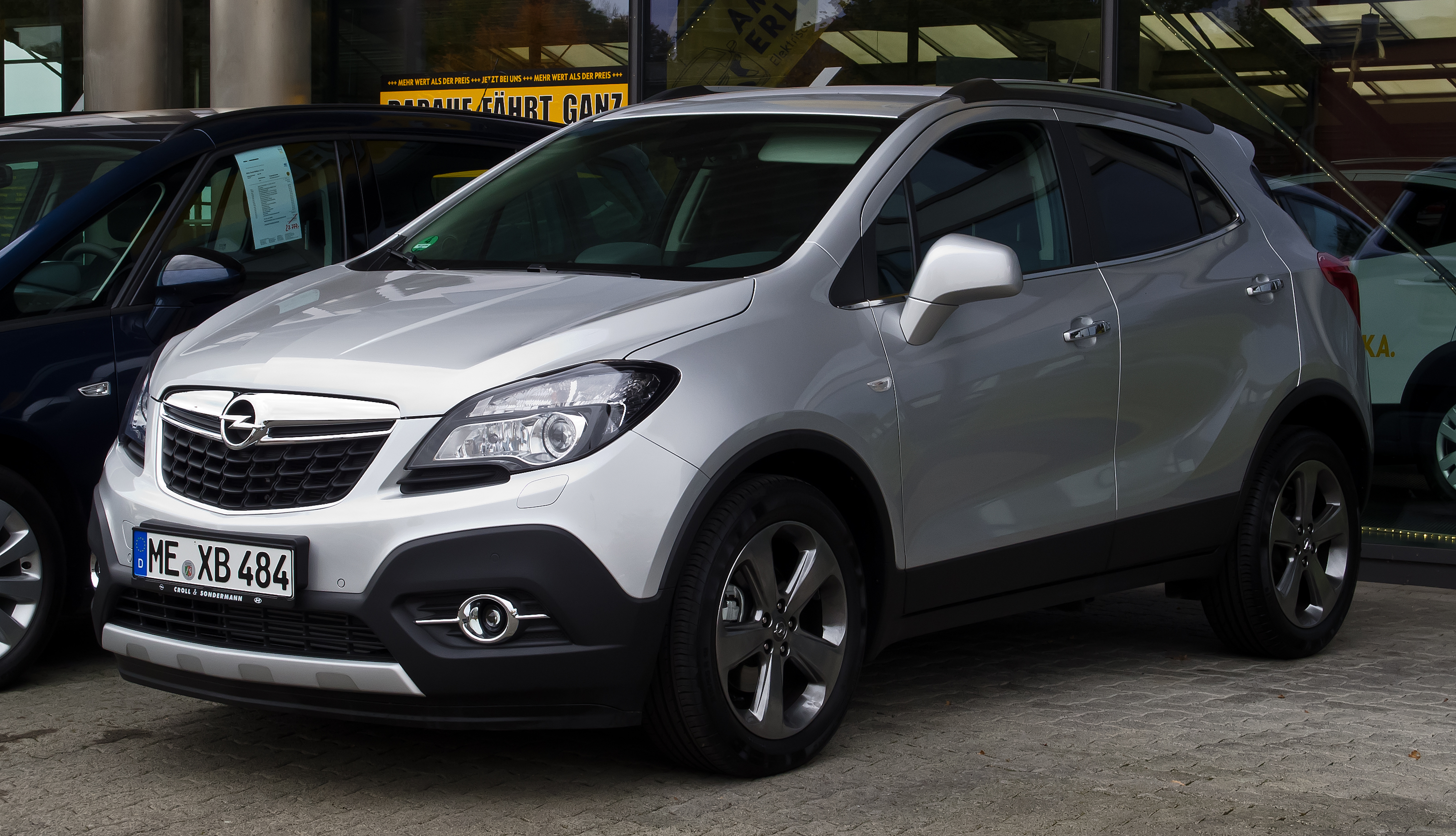

Overview
- Manufacturer: Opel (General Motors)
- Model code: J13
- Also called: Opel Mokka X (2016–2019); Vauxhall Mokka (United Kingdom); Vauxhall Mokka X (United Kingdom); Buick Encore (North America and China)
- Production: 2012–2019 (Vauxhall/Opel); 2012–2022 (Buick)
- Model years: 2013–2022 (Buick)
- Assembly: South Korea: Bupyeong (GM Korea); Spain: Zaragoza; China: Shanghai (SAIC-GM); Russia: Kaliningrad (Avtotor); Belarus: Minsk (Unison)
- Designer: Carsten Aengenheyster; Marc van der Haegen (facelift)

Body and chassis
- Layout: Front-engine, front-wheel drive/four-wheel-drive
- Platform: GM Gamma II platform
- Related: Chevrolet Trax

Powertrain
- Engine: Petrol: 1.4 L A14NET turbo I4; 1.4 L B14XFT GDI turbo I4; 1.6 L A16XER I4; 1.8 L A18XER I4; Diesel: 1.6 L B16DTN turbo I4; 1.6 L B16DTH turbo I4; 1.7 L A17DTS turbo I4
- Power output: From 90 kW (120 hp) to 170 kW (230 hp) (Overboost)
- Transmission: 5-speed manual; 6-speed manual; 6-speed GM 6T40 automatic

Dimensions
- Wheelbase: 2,555 mm (100.6 in)
- Length: 4,280 mm (168.5 in)
- Width: 1,775 mm (69.9 in)
- Height: 1,646 mm (64.8 in)
- Kerb weight: 1,293 kg (2,851 lb) (2WD); 1,386 kg (3,056 lb) (4WD)

The Mokka was positioned below the Antara and the Zafira Tourer in the Opel line-up, and was available in both front wheel and four wheel drive versions. The Mokka name derives from the small, round coffee beans of the Coffea Arabica variety. The Mokka A is based on GM's Gamma II platform.

The four wheel drive option was an intelligent AWD system that maintains 100% drive at the front wheels until the system detects slip, fast starts or tight cornering, in which case it can send up to 50% of torque to the rear wheels.

Production and sales started in autumn of 2012. By February 2013, Opel had over 80,000 Mokka orders, and after two months 100,000 orders. By October 2014, over 300,000 Mokkas were ordered in Europe. In January 2016, Opel announced 500,000 firm orders for Mokka overall.

In 2019, Opel ceased production of the first generation Mokka as part of Opel/Vauxhall's full switch to Groupe PSA car platforms. However, it remained in production by GM Korea as the Buick Encore for North America until the Encore was discontinued in 2022.

The Chevrolet/Holden Trax is derived from the Mokka (and Encore), only with unique sheet metal and trim.

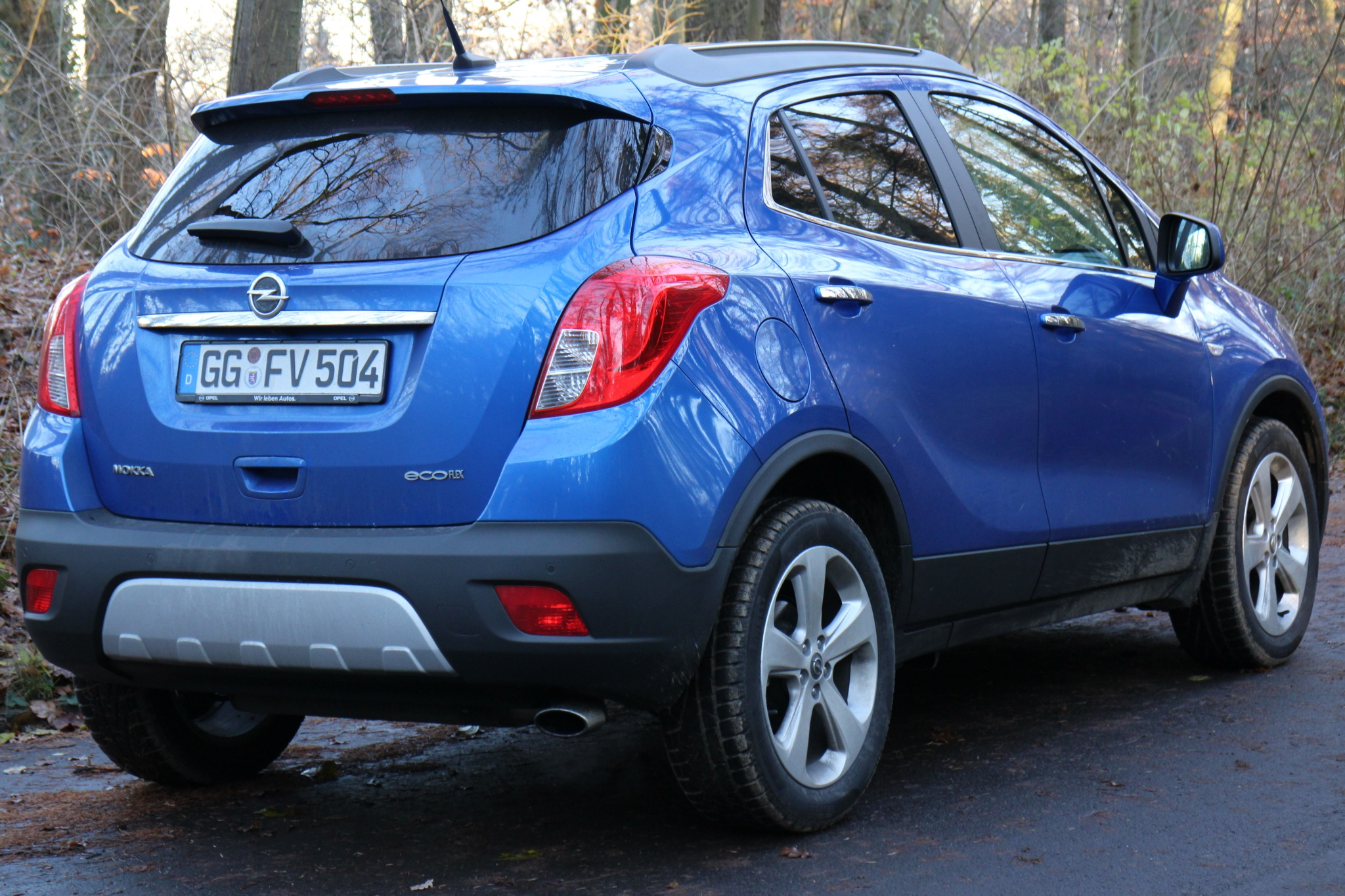
Opel Mokka (pre-facelift)

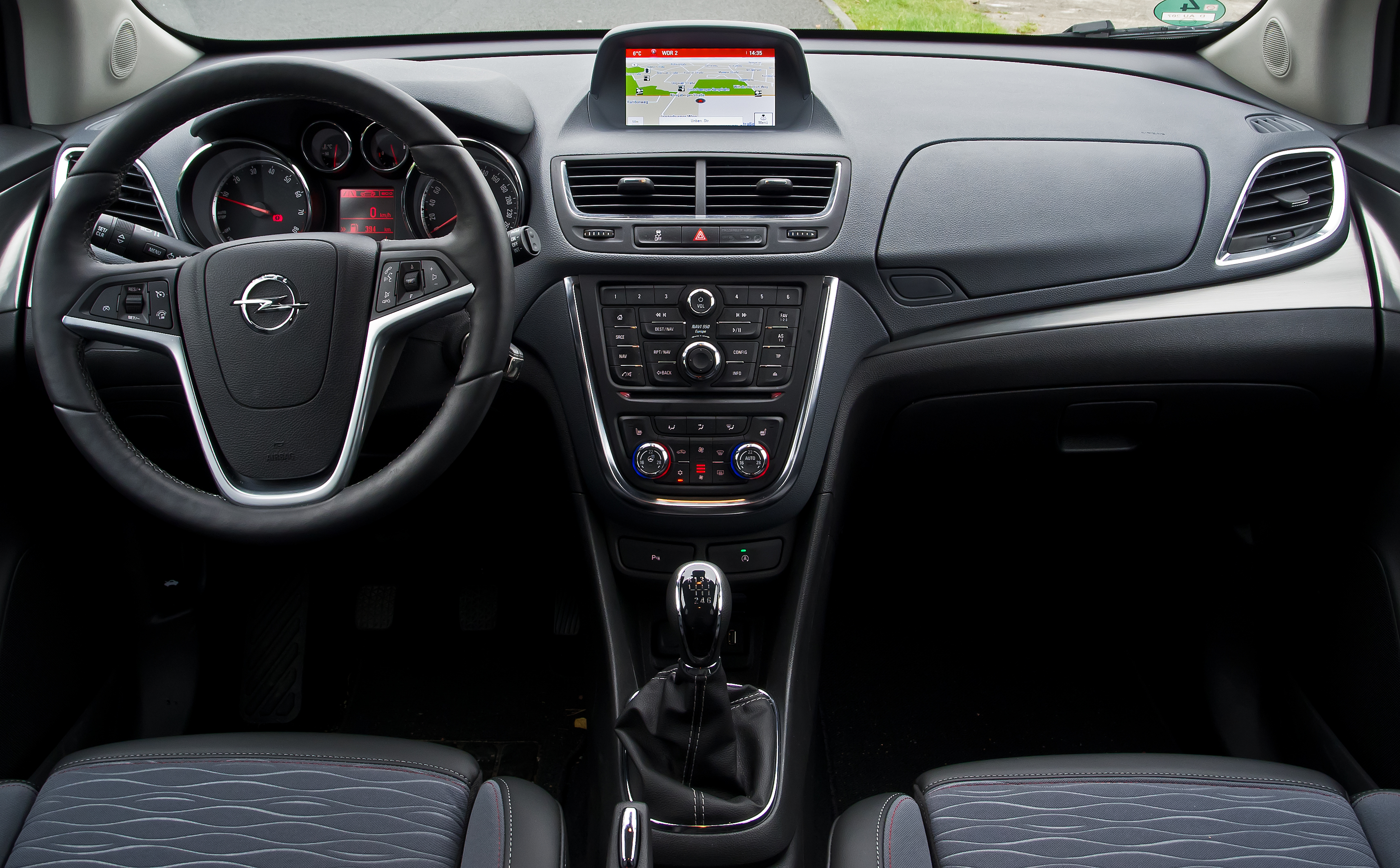
Interior (pre-facelift)

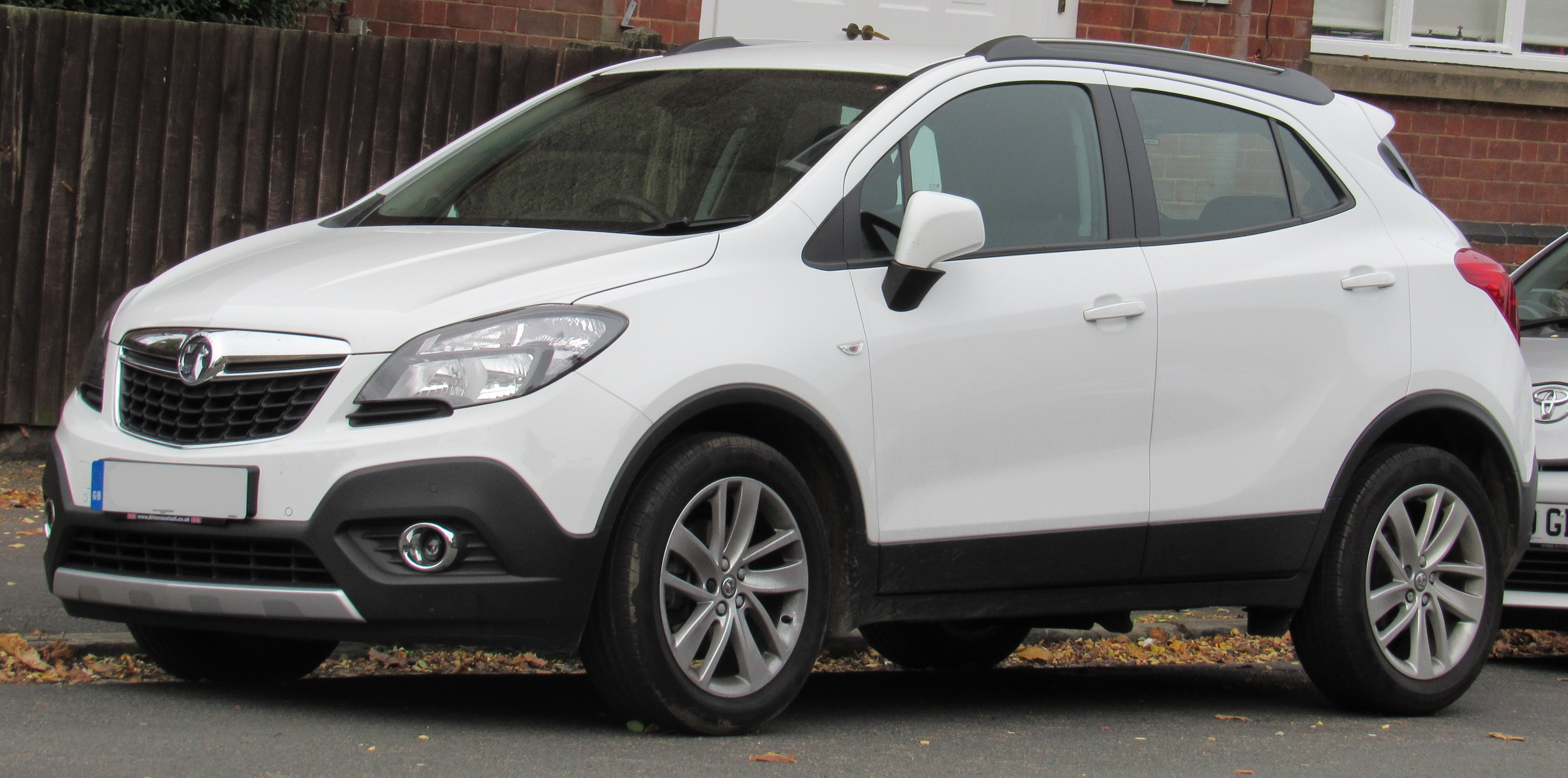
Vauxhall Mokka

=== Facelift ===
In April 2016, Opel and Vauxhall unveiled an updated version of the Mokka for the model year of 2017, designated as the Mokka X, which went on sale in the end of 2016. The new Mokka X received a facelift with new headlights, restyled bumpers, new LED tail lights, and a revised interior with an all new dashboard, instrument cluster, and centre stack. The more powerful optional 152 PS (112 kW; 150 hp) petrol engine was also introduced with the Mokka X.

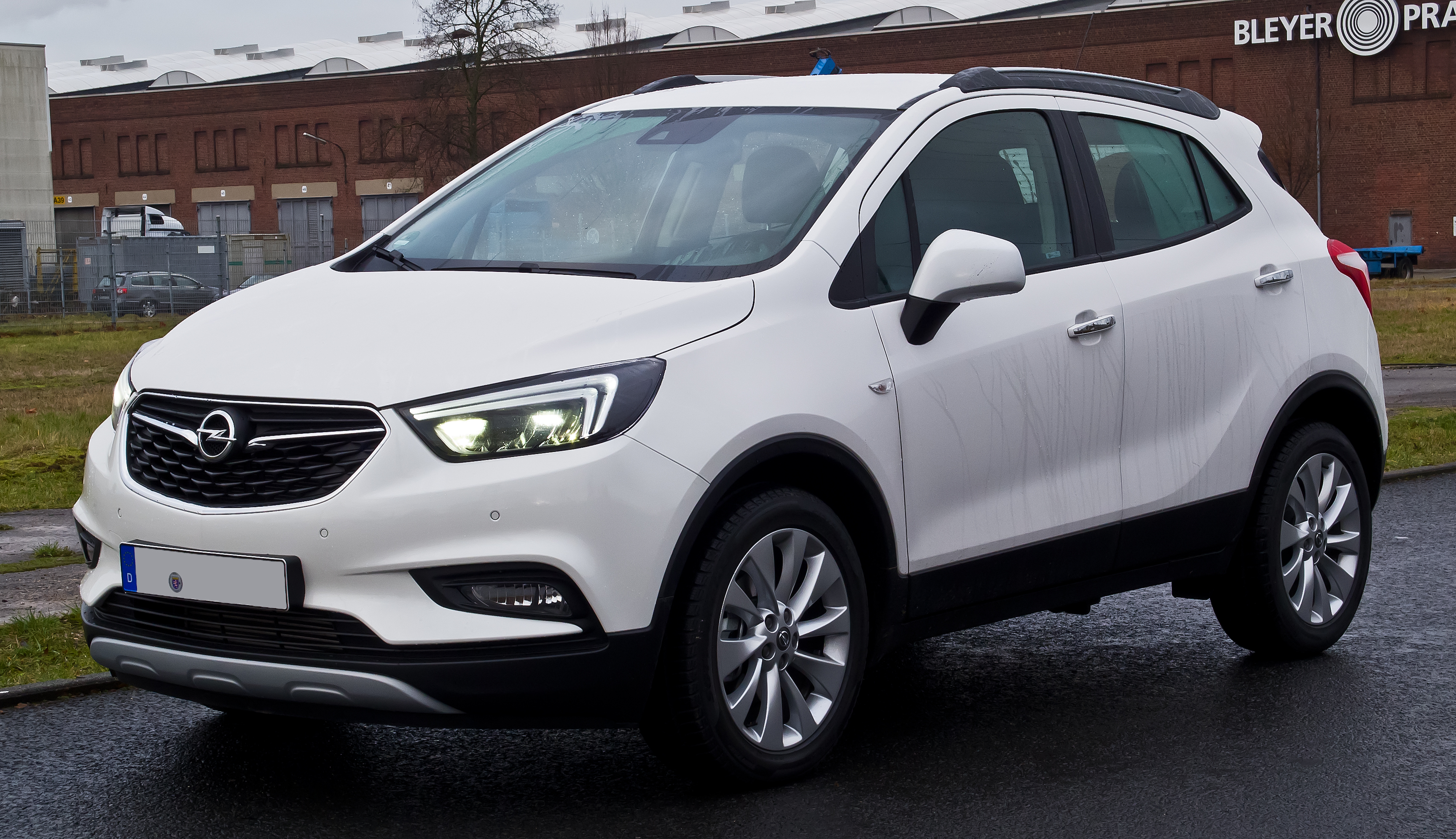
Opel Mokka X (facelift)

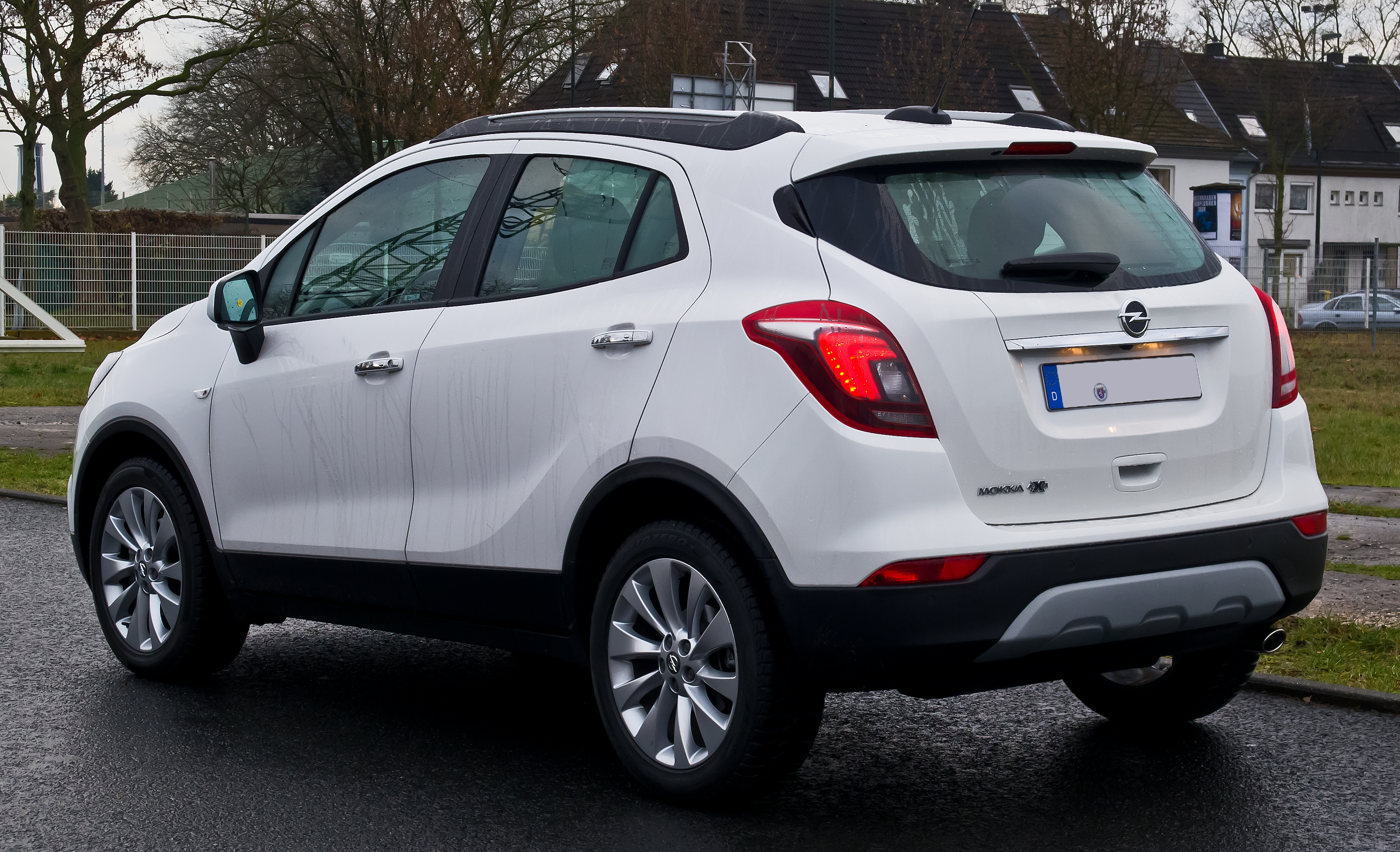
Opel Mokka X (facelift)

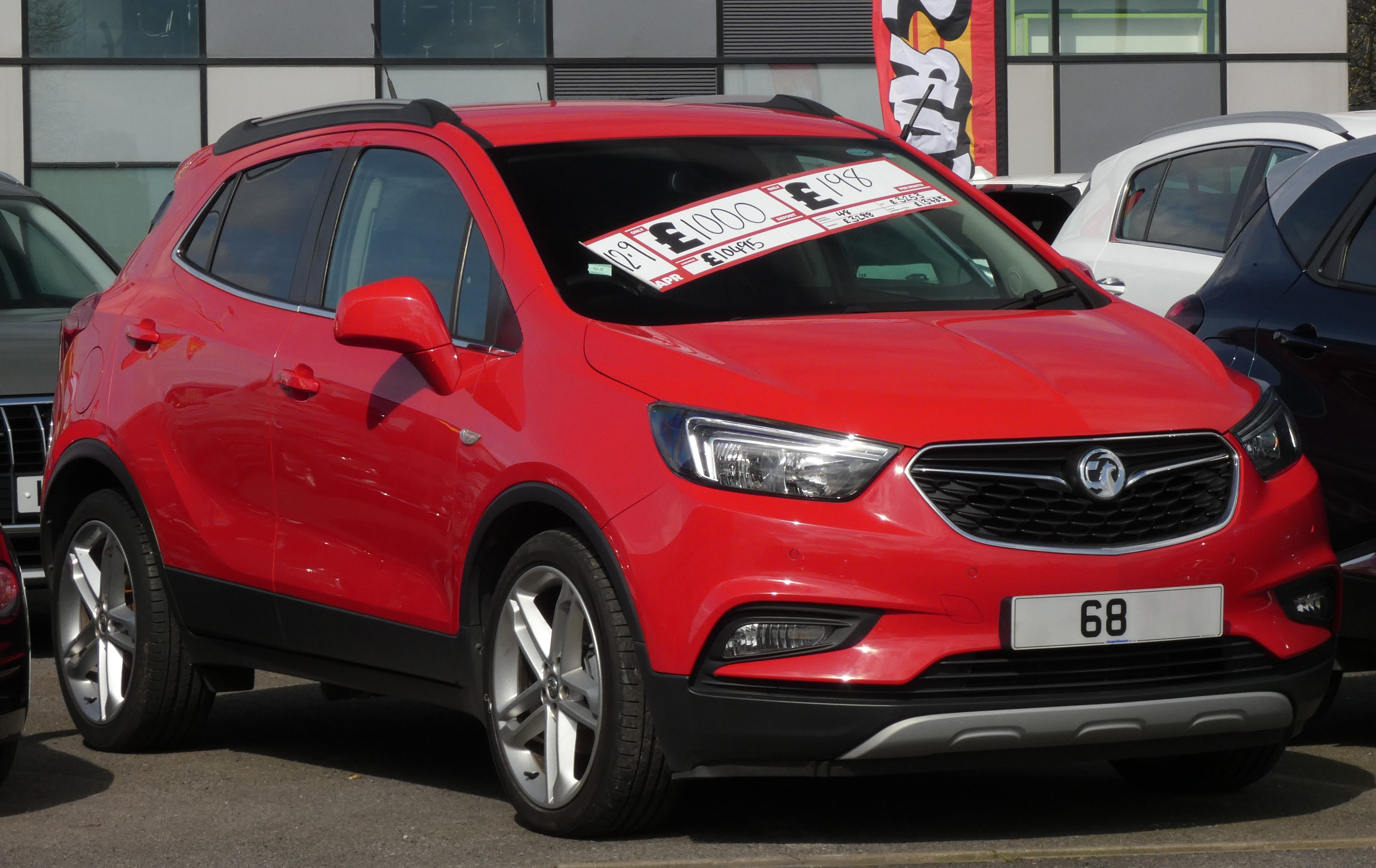
Vauxhall Mokka X (facelift)

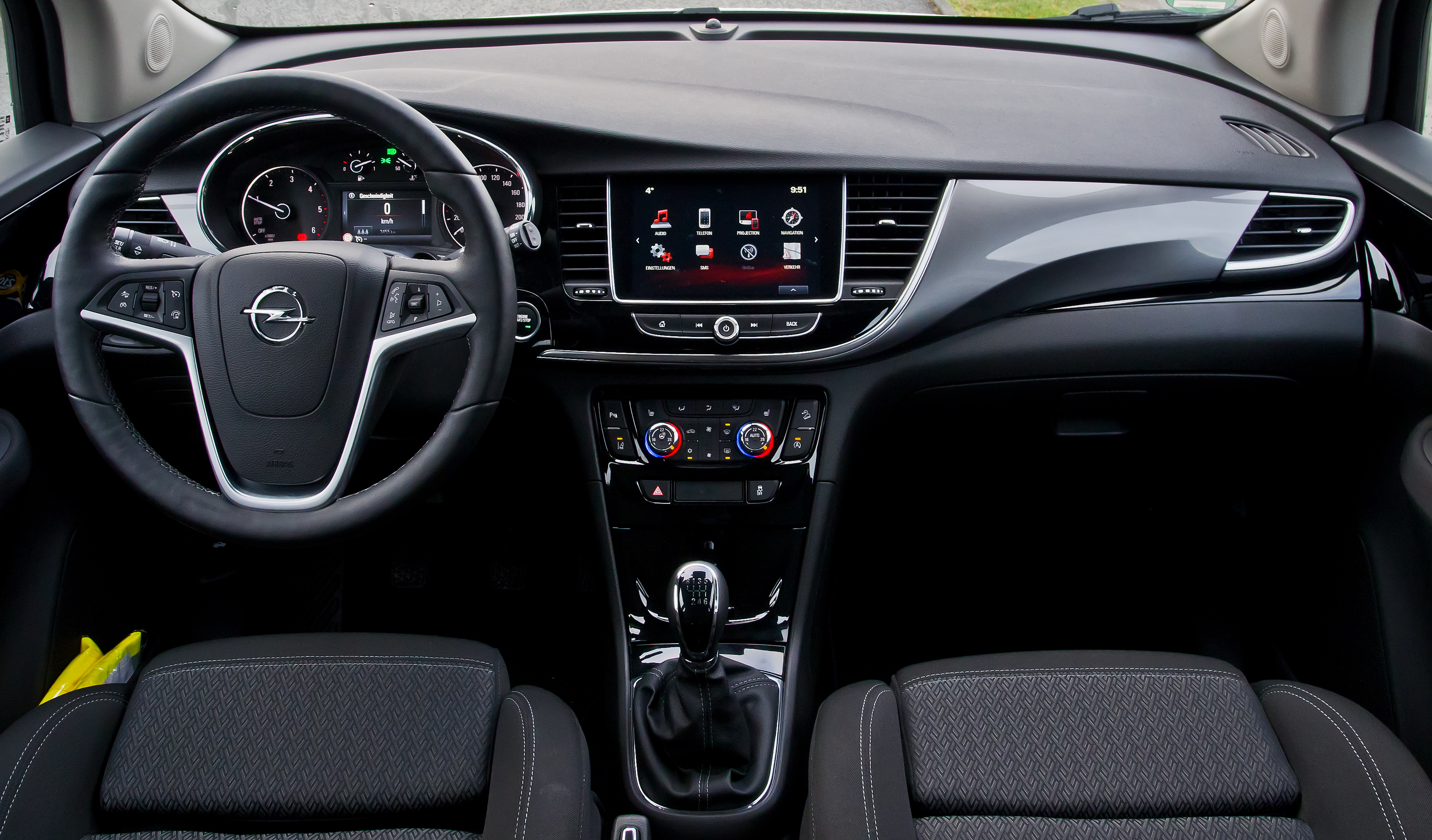
Interior (facelift)

=== Mokka by Bitter ===
Bitter has been producing a luxury version of the Mokka since 2016. Facelifted in the end of 2016 along with the Vauxhall and Opel models, the name was also changed to Mokka X. The differences between the Bitter and Opel versions are mainly cosmetic.

=== Engines ===
As introduced in 2012, the Mokka was offered with a choice of three engines: a 115 PS (85 kW; 113 bhp) 1.6-litre petrol, a 140 PS (103 kW; 138 bhp) 1.4-litre turbo petrol, and a 130 PS (96 kW; 128 hp) 1.7-litre diesel.

Other petrol and diesel engines were offered later, including a 152 PS (112 kW; 150 bhp) 1.4-litre direct injection turbo petrol engine with a controversial start/stop feature introduced for model year 2016.

Most engines are paired standard with the 5-speed (1.6-litre MPI petrol engine only) or 6-speed manual transmission, with stop/start engine technology beginning as early as model year 2014. A six speed automatic transmission having active select mode is optionally available for select petrol and diesel engines including the 1.4-litre MPI Turbo petrol and 1.7-litre CDTI diesel engines for both FWD and AWD models.

Start/Stop technology on vehicles with automatic transmissions first appeared with the introduction of the new, more powerful (112 kW; 150 hp), B14XFT 1.4-litre direct injection (DI) VVT Turbo petrol engine for model year 2016 and was incorporated on other select petrol and diesel engines paired with automatic transmissions by model year 2018.

For the Russian market a version with the 1.8-litre A18XER (Korean designation F18DA) petrol engine is available. The cars for the Russian market were assembled by Avtotor (Kaliningrad, Russia) and later by Unison (Minsk, Belarus) from 2015. In October 2014, for the model year of 2015, Opel introduced its all new "whisper diesel" 1.6-litre CDTI engine which replaced the 1.7-litre CDTI diesel. The engine specifications in the following tables is from the 2013, 2015, and 2018 Opel owner manual.

Petrol engines
Model	Engine	Displacement	Power	Torque	Engine ID Code	CO_{2} emission (g/km)	Years
1.4L VVT MPI Turbo	I4	1364 cc	120 PS (88 kW; 118 hp) at 4900–6000 rpm to 232 PS (171 kW; 229 hp) (Overboost)	200 N⋅m (148 lb⋅ft) at 1850–4900 rpm to 420 N⋅m (310 lb⋅ft) (Overboost)	A14NET	160	2013–2019
1.4L VVT MPI Turbo	I4	1364 cc	140 PS (103 kW; 138 hp) at 4900–6000 rpm	200 N⋅m (148 lb⋅ft) at 1850–4900 rpm	B14NET	153	2013–2019
1.4L VVT DI Turbo	I4	1399 cc	152 PS (112 kW; 150 hp) at 4900–6000 rpm	235 N⋅m (173 lb⋅ft) at 1850–4900 rpm	B14XFT	155	2016–2019
1.6L VVT MPI	I4	1598 cc	115 PS (85 kW; 113 hp) at 6200 rpm	155 N⋅m (114 lb⋅ft) at 4000 rpm	A16XER B16XER	139	2013–2019
1.8L VVT MPI	I4	1796 cc	140 PS (103 kW; 138 hp) at 6200 rpm	178 N⋅m (131 lb⋅ft) at 3800 rpm	A18XER	225 (FWD, MT5), 257 (AWD, AT6)	2013–2019

Diesel engines
Model	Engine	Displacement	Power	Torque	Engine ID Code	CO_{2} emission (g/km)	Years
1.6L CDTI ecoFLEX	I4	1598 cc	110 PS (81 kW; 108 hp) at 4000 rpm	300 N⋅m (221 lb⋅ft) at 2000–2250 rpm	B16DTN B16DTU	114–109	2015–2019
1.6L CDTI Turbo ecoFLEX	I4	1598 cc	136 PS (100 kW; 134 hp) at 3500–4000 rpm	320 N⋅m (236 lb⋅ft) at 2000–2250 rpm	B16DTH	109–119	2015–2019
1.7L CDTI ecoFLEX	I4	1686 cc	130 PS (96 kW; 128 hp) at 4000 rpm	300 N⋅m (221 lb⋅ft) at 2000–2500 rpm	A17DTS	120–129	2013–2015

Engine code prefix B indicates Start/Stop technology. B14NET is also available for LPG.

== Mokka B (P2QO, 2021) ==
Mokka B
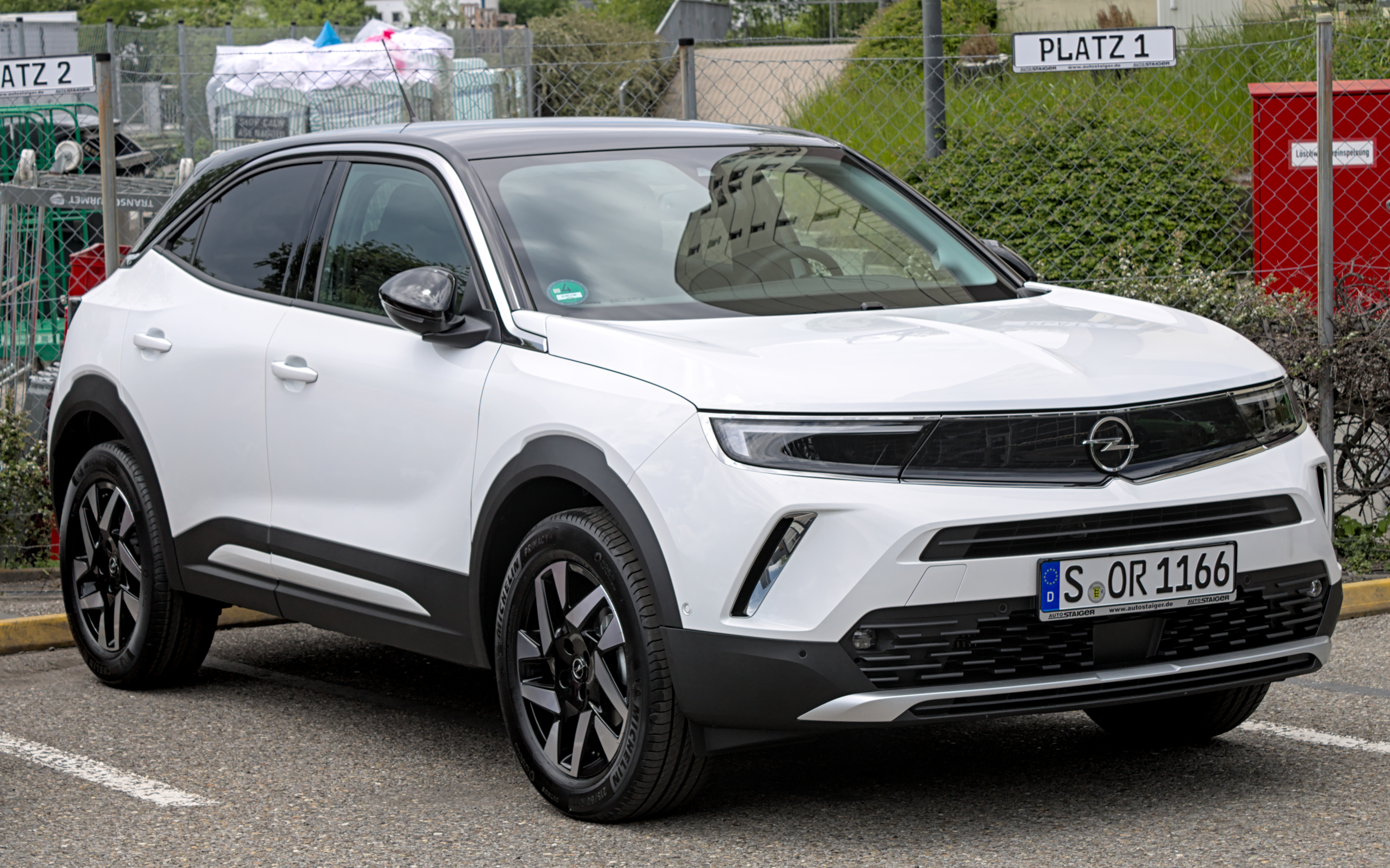

Overview
- Manufacturer: Opel (Stellantis)
- Also called: Vauxhall Mokka (United Kingdom)
- Production: 2020–present
- Assembly: France: Poissy (Poissy Plant)
- Designer: Niels Loeb, Richard Duff and Frank Starz under Mark Adams

Body and chassis
- Platform: PSA CMP (EMP1) platform
- Related: Opel Corsa F; Peugeot 2008 II; DS3 Crossback; Citroen C4 III; Jeep Avenger; Fiat 600; Alfa Romeo Junior; Peugeot 208 II; Lancia Ypsilon IV

Powertrain
- Engine: Petrol: 1.2 L EB2ADTD/EB2DTS turbo I3; Petrol Hybrid; 1.2 L EB2LTEDH2 turbo I3; Diesel: 1.5 L DV5 BlueHDi I4
- Electric motor: Permanent Magnet Synchronous Motor (Mokka-e)
- Transmission: 6-speed manual; 8-speed automatic; 6-speed e-DCT (Hybrid); 1-speed direct-drive (Mokka-e)
- Hybrid drivetrain: Mild-Hybrid
- Battery: 0.43 kWh (Hybrid) 50 kWh lithium-ion
- Electric range: 322 km (200 mi) (WLTP)

Dimensions
- Wheelbase: 2,557 mm (100.7 in)
- Length: 4,151 mm (163.4 in)
- Width: 1,791 mm (70.5 in)
- Height: 1,531 mm (60.3 in)
- Kerb weight: 1,195–1,220 kg (2,634.5–2,689.6 lb) (ICE); 1,598 kg (3,523.0 lb) (Mokka-e)

The second-generation Mokka (B) was announced in August 2018 by the show car Opel GT X Experimental concept, and unveiled on 24 June 2020. Now based on the ex-PSA Group's Common Modular Platform (CMP), the car is available with an electric version dubbed as the Mokka-e.

The ICE version was unveiled on 2 September 2020. Sales of the second-generation Mokka began with the model year of 2021, on 23 December 2020. The production model assembly started in January 2021. There are three engine options, including a 1.2-litre turbocharged three-cylinder petrol rated at 100 PS (74 kW; 99 bhp) and 205 N⋅m (151 lb⋅ft) of torque with a 6-speed manual transmission and a 1.2-litre turbo making 130 PS (96 kW; 128 bhp) and 230 N⋅m (170 lb⋅ft) of torque in combination with a standard 6-speed manual or 8-speed automatic transmissions. While the only diesel engine on offer is a 1.5-litre four-cylinder rated at 110 PS (81 kW; 108 bhp) and 250 N⋅m (184 lb⋅ft) of torque, offered exclusively with a 6-speed manual transmission. The diesel engine was removed from the lineup in August 2022.

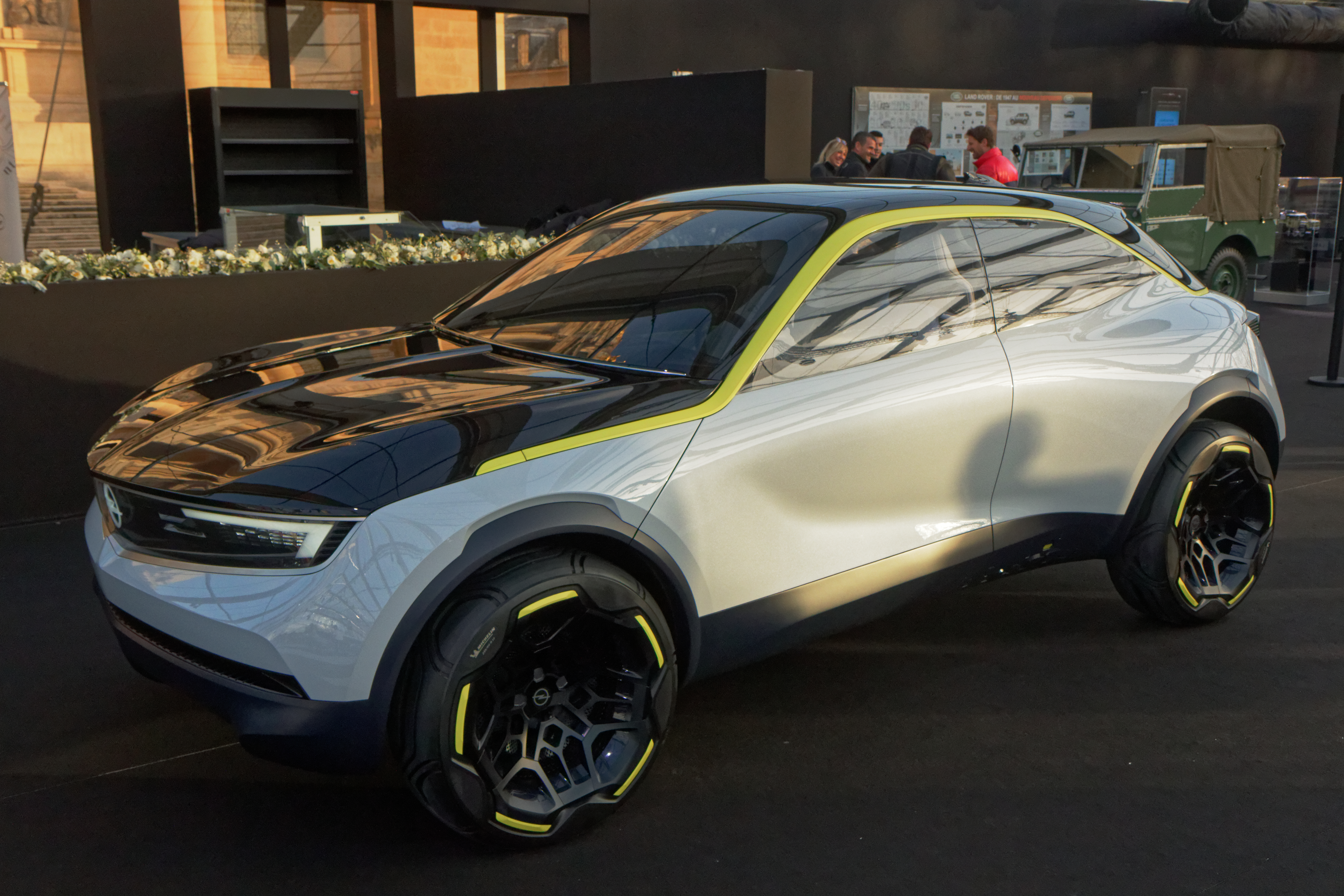
Opel GT X Experimental

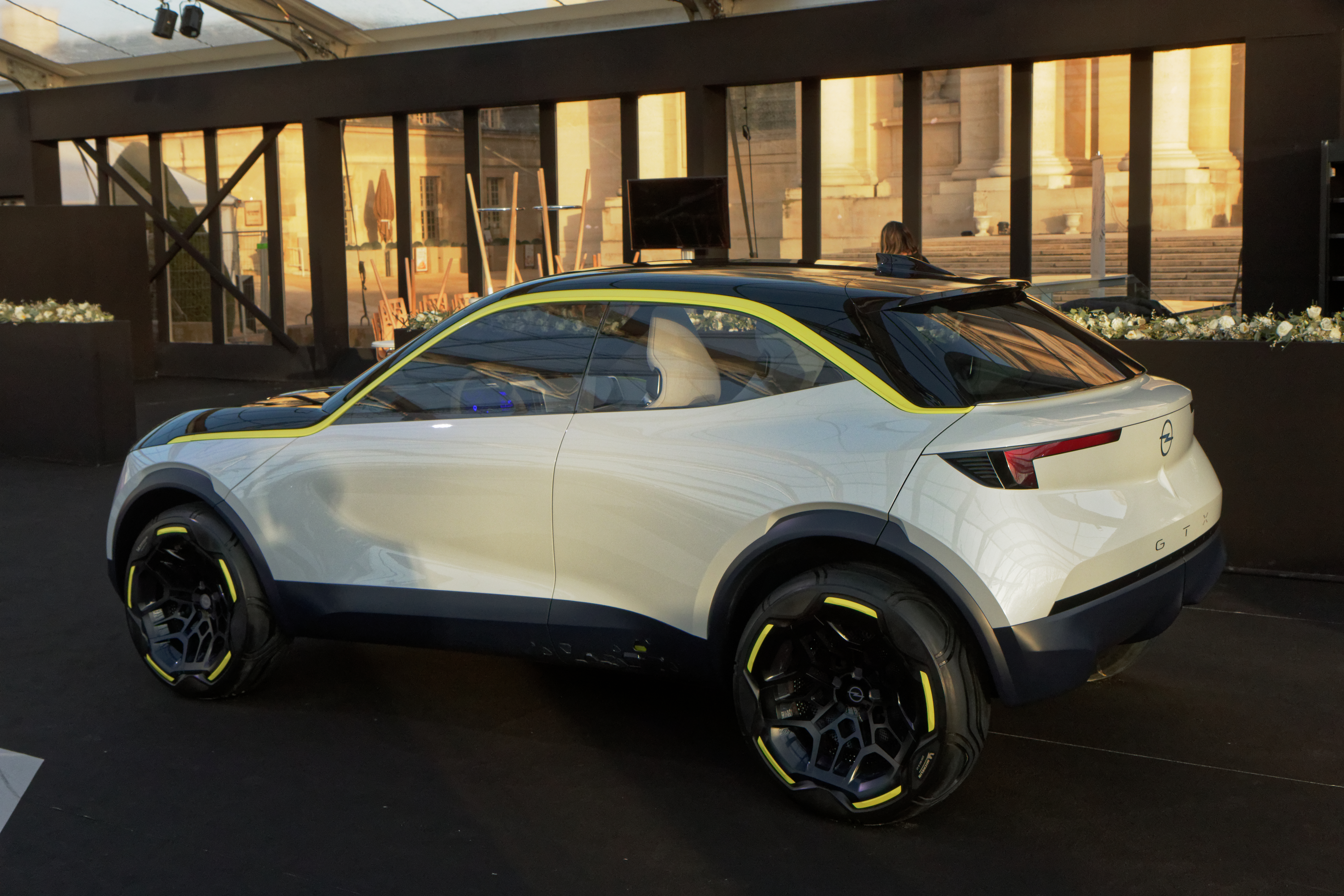
Opel GT X Experimental

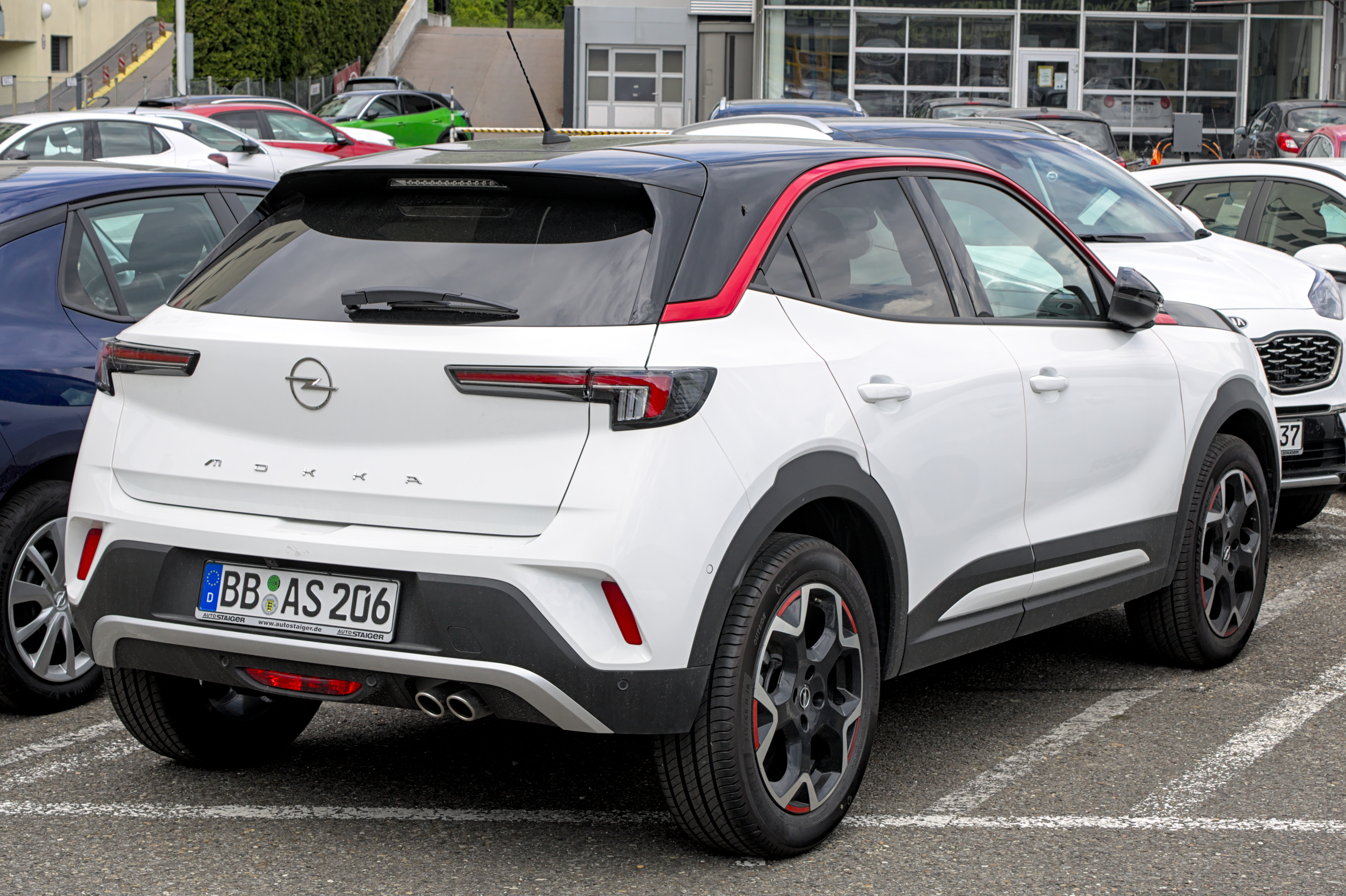
Opel Mokka GS Line (rear view)

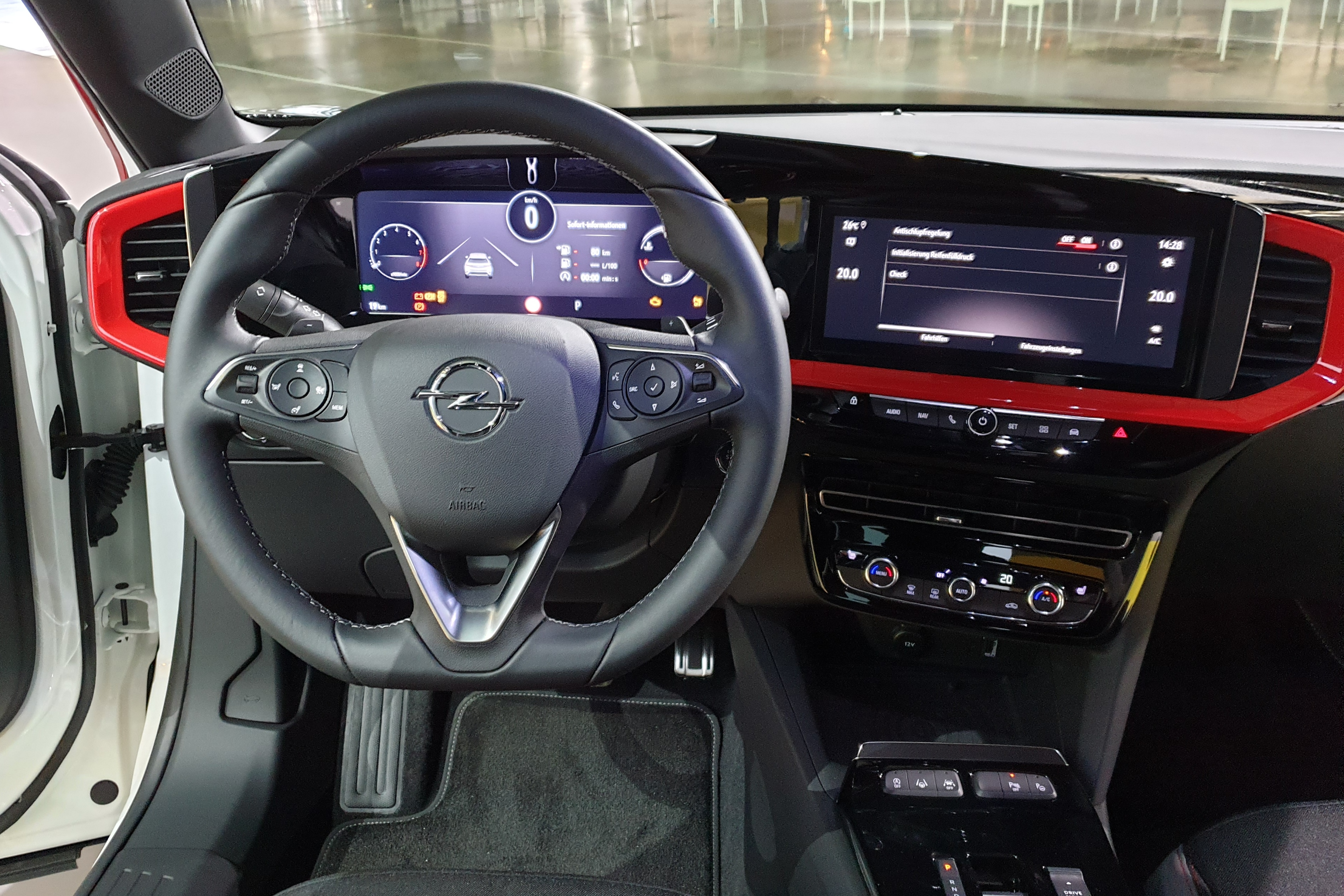
Interior (pre-facelift)

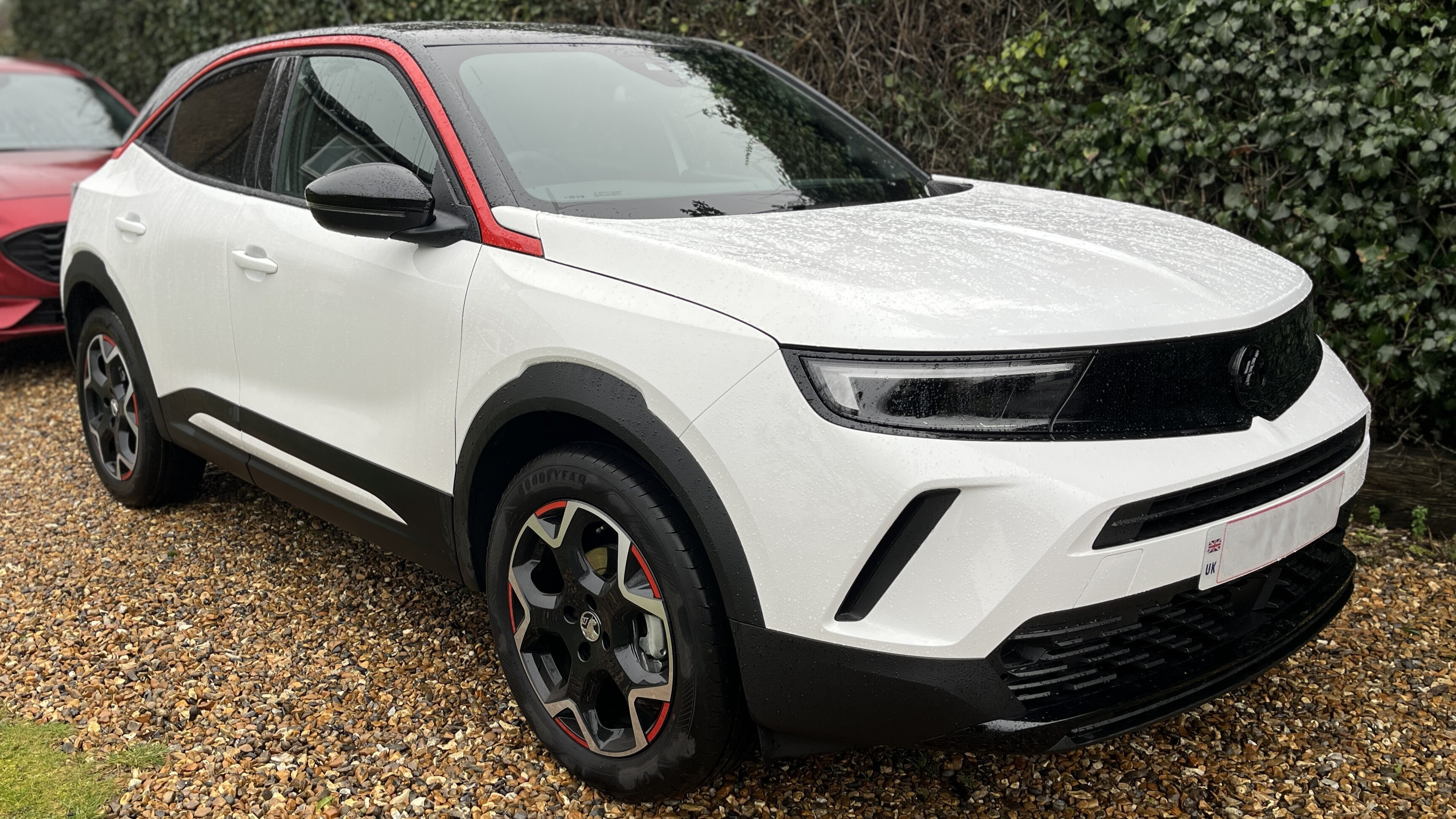
Vauxhall Mokka (front view, pre-facelift)

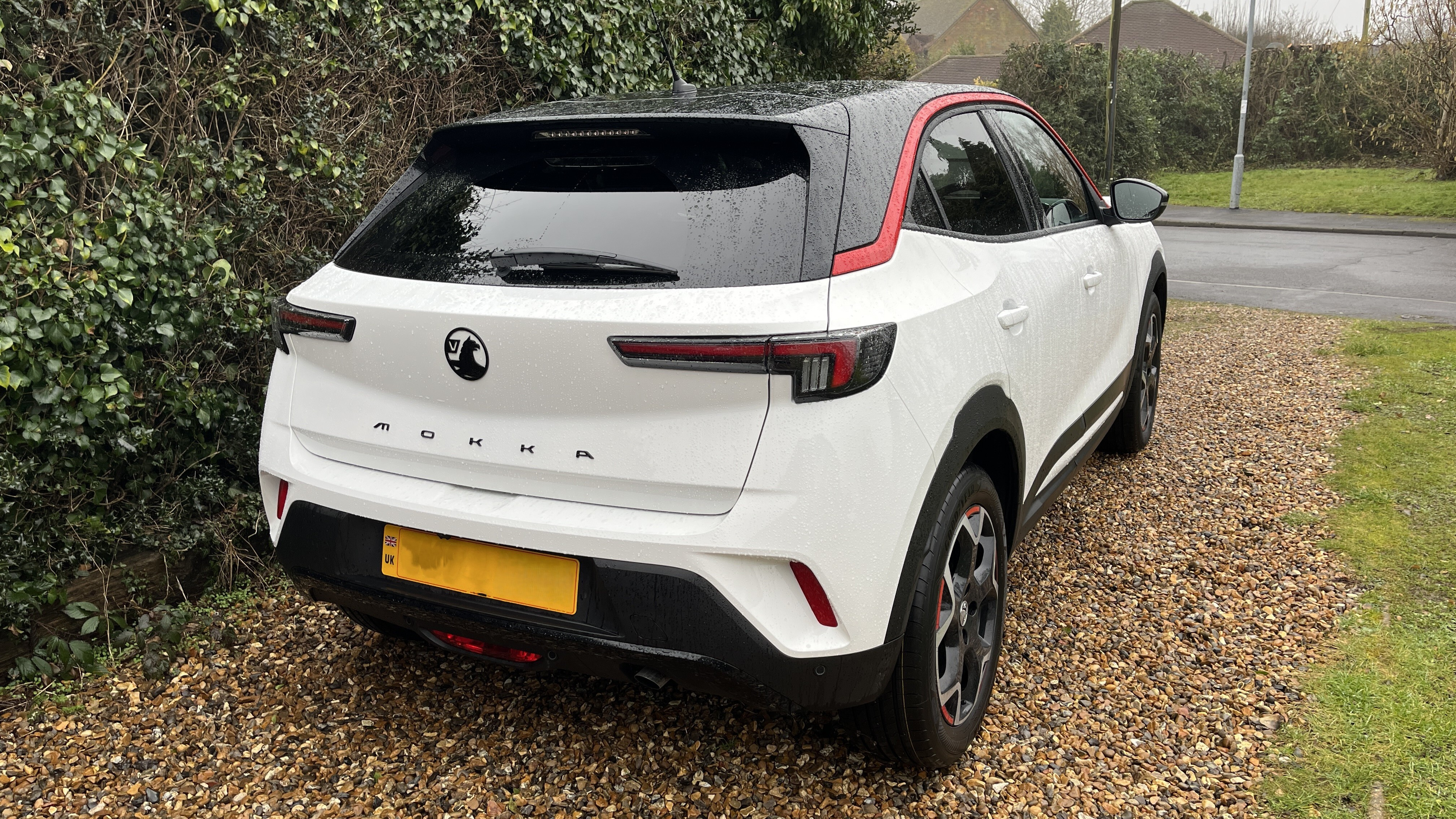
Vauxhall Mokka (rear view, pre-facelift)

Engines
Petrol
Model	Engine	Displacement	Power	Torque	Engine ID Code	CO_{2} emission (g/km)	Transmission	Years
1.2L VVT DI Turbo	I3	1199 cc	100 PS (74 kW; 99 hp) at 5500 rpm	205 N⋅m (151 lb⋅ft) at 1750 rpm	EB2ADTD/F12XHL	125	6–speed manual	2021–2024
1.2L VVT DI Turbo	I3	1199 cc	136 PS (100 kW; 134 hp) at 5500 rpm	230 N⋅m (170 lb⋅ft) at 1750 rpm	EB2ADTS/F12XHT	128	6–speed manual	2021–
1.2L VVT DI Turbo	I3	1199 cc	130 PS (96 kW; 128 hp) at 5500 rpm	230 N⋅m (170 lb⋅ft) at 1750 rpm	EB2ADTS/F12XHT	138	8–speed automatic	2021–
1.2L VVT DI Turbo	I3	1199 cc	145 PS (107 kW; 143 hp) at 5500 rpm	230 N⋅m (170 lb⋅ft) at 1750 rpm	EB2LTEDH2	109	6-speed dual–clutch transmission	2024–
Diesel
Model	Engine	Displacement	Power	Torque	Engine ID Code	CO_{2} emission (g/km)	Transmission	Years
1.5L Turbo	I4	1499 cc	110 PS (81 kW; 108 hp) at 3500 rpm	250 N⋅m (184 lb⋅ft) at 1750 rpm	F15DT	117	6–speed manual	2021–2022

=== Mokka-e ===
The Mokka-e, the all-electric version of the Mokka, is powered by a 50 kWh lithium-ion battery with a WLTP range of 322 km (200 mi). Three driving modes are available, Sport, Eco and Normal.

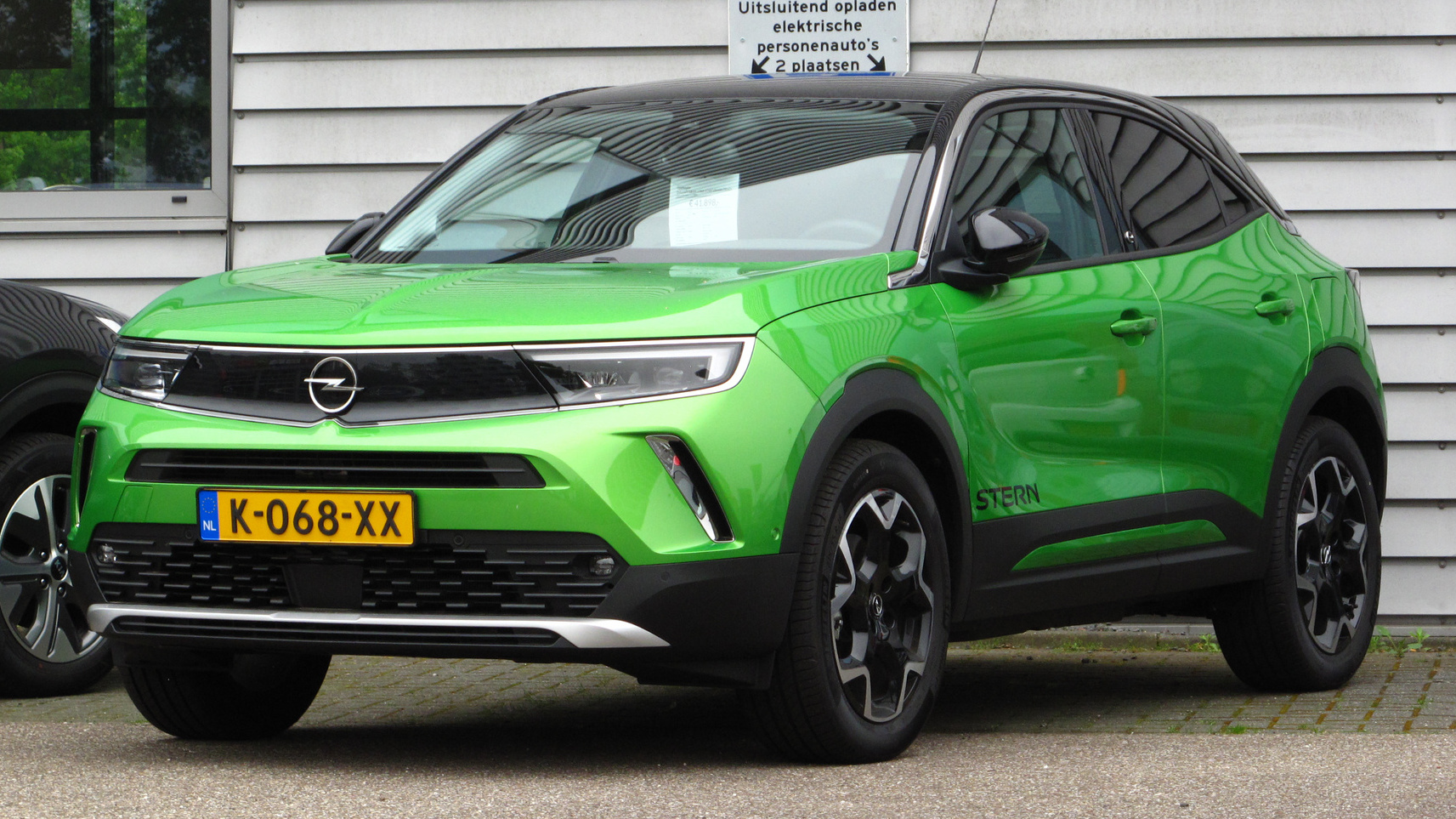
Opel Mokka-e

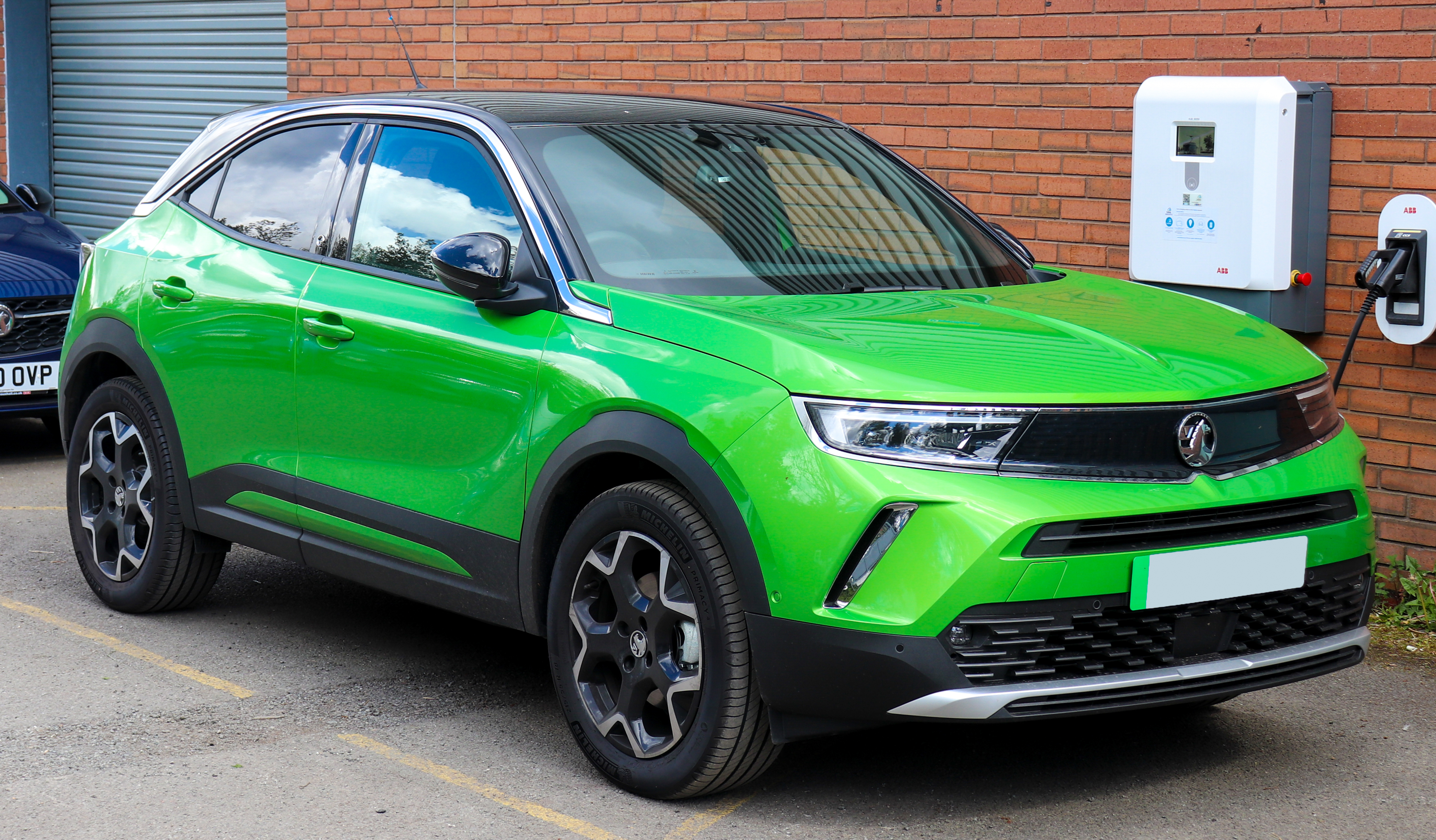
Vauxhall Mokka-e

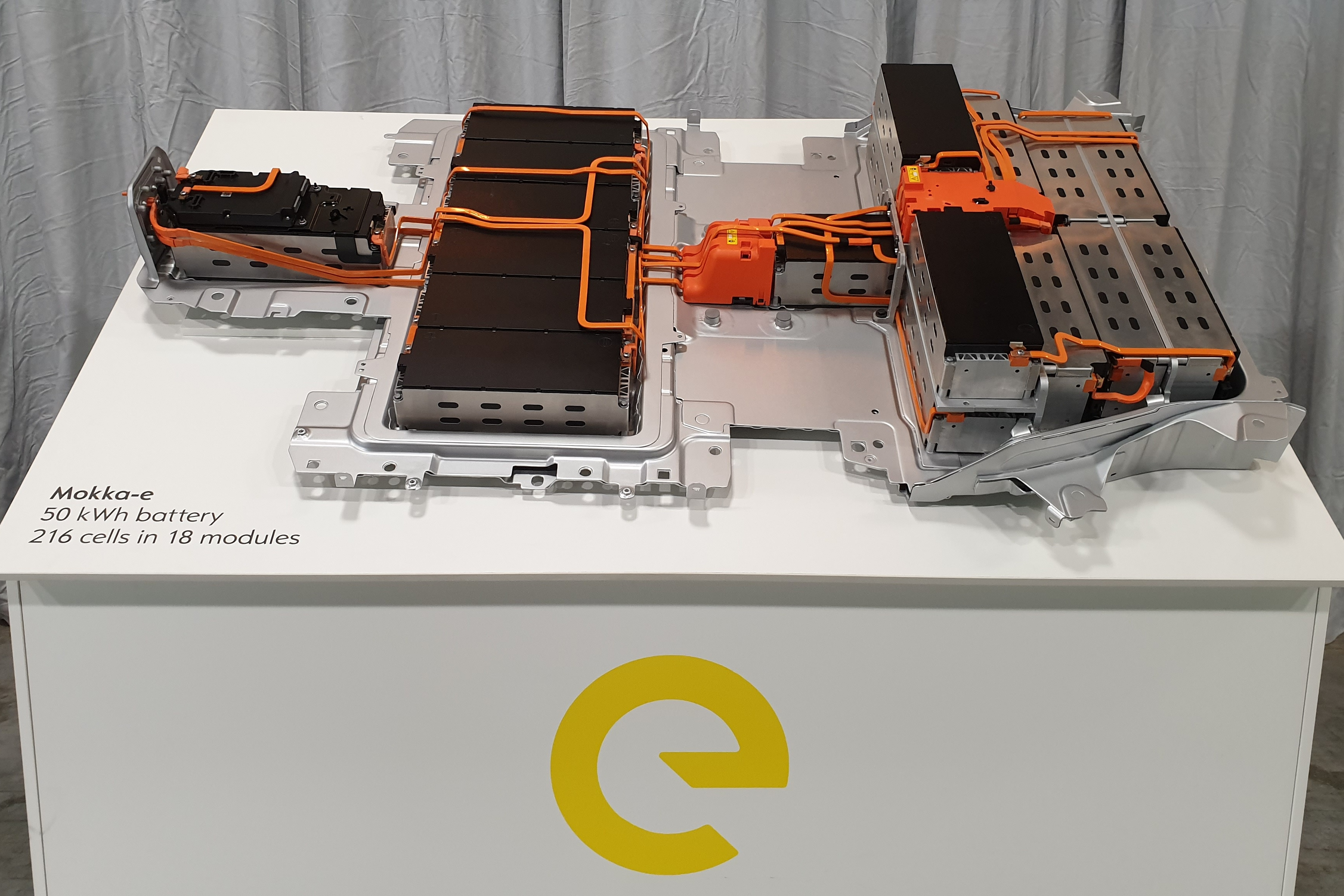
Battery configuration

=== Facelift ===
A facelift was unveiled on 23 October 2024. There are minimal exterior changes but there are updated lighting graphics, the brand's visor front fascia features the new logo, and new black exterior accents replaced the chrome inserts. Inside, there is a new steering wheel, updated software for the infotainment system, some functions that were previously controlled by buttons are integrated into the touchscreen, a new matte silver centre console and all fabrics are made from recycled content.

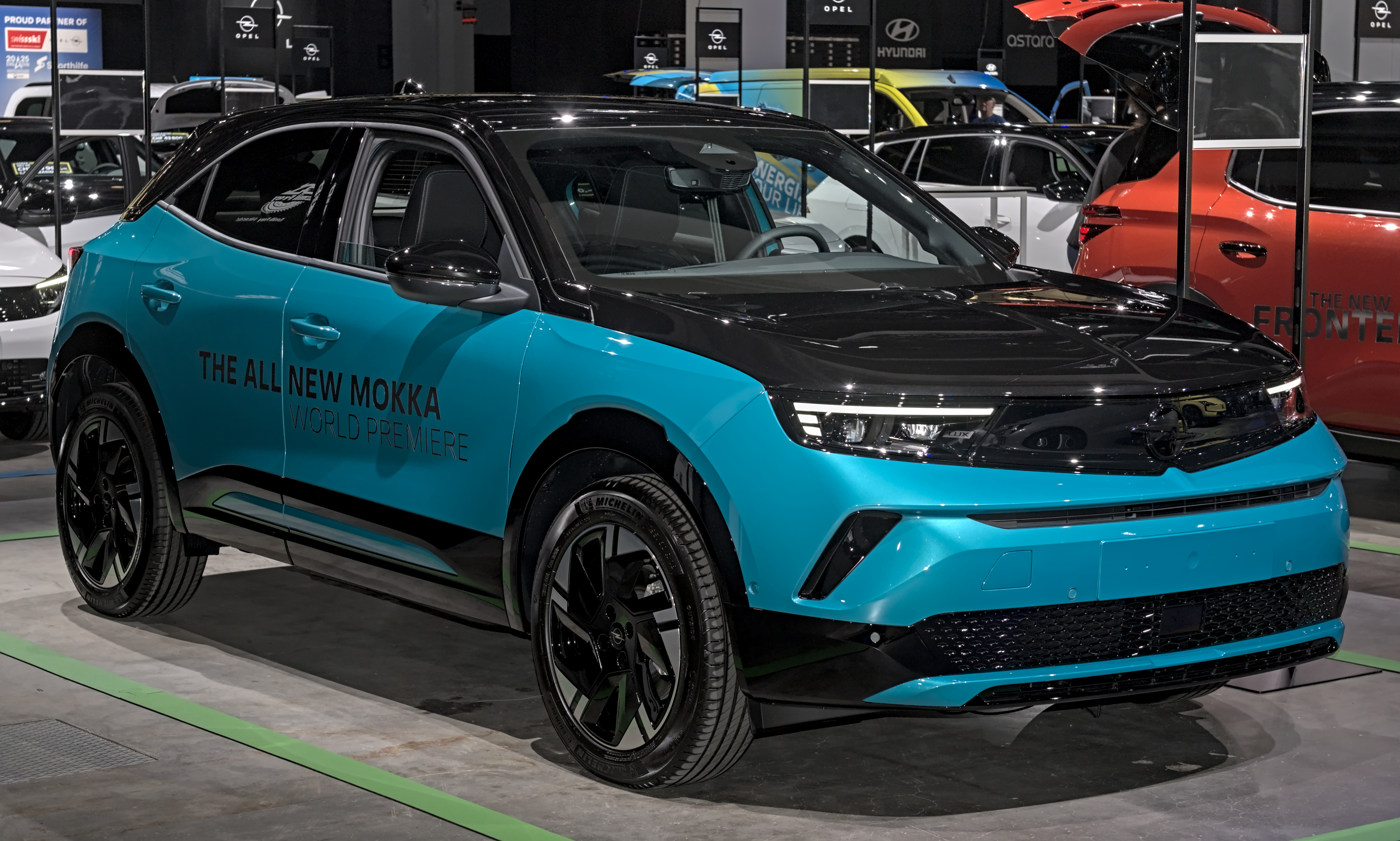
2025 Opel Mokka-e

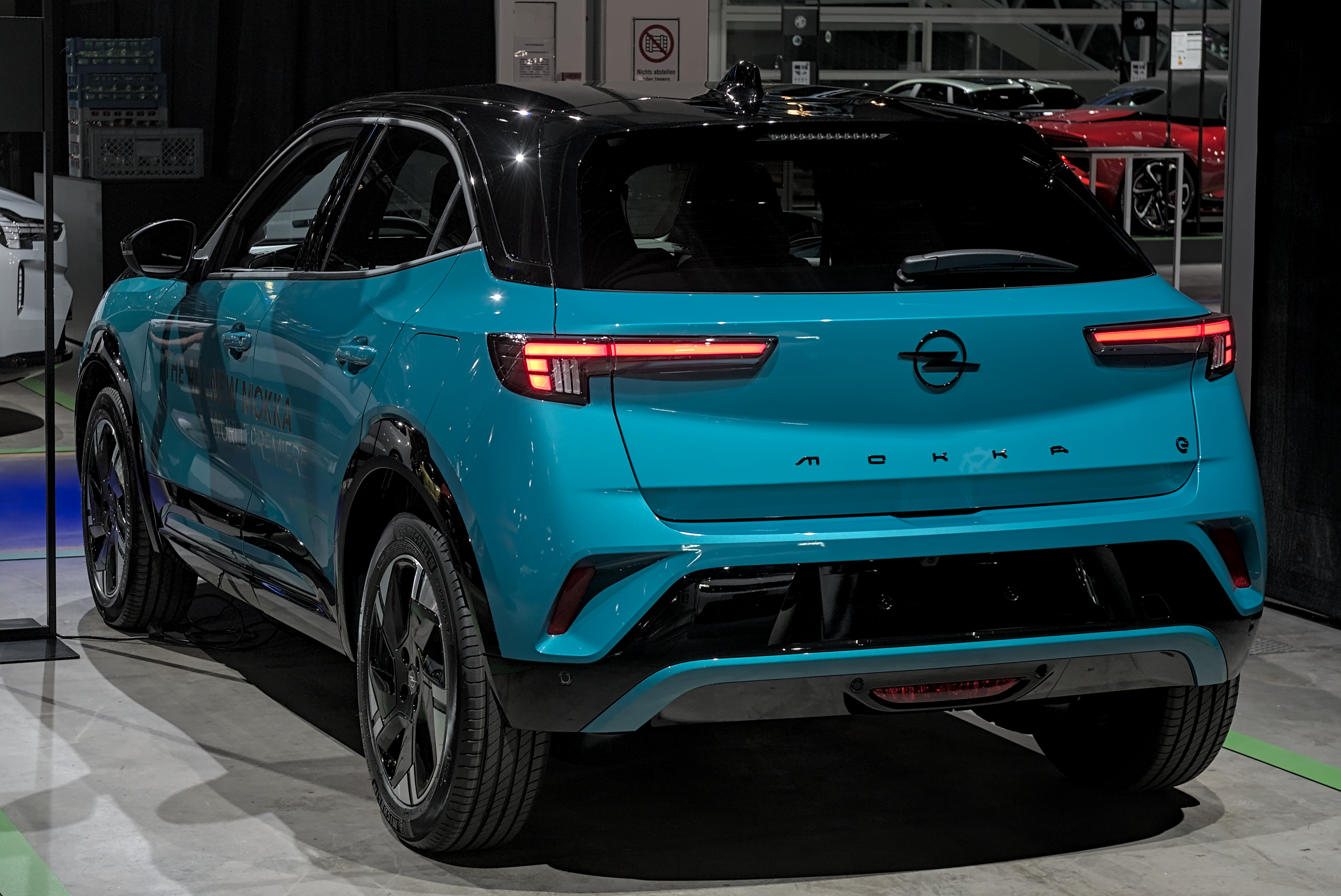
Rear view

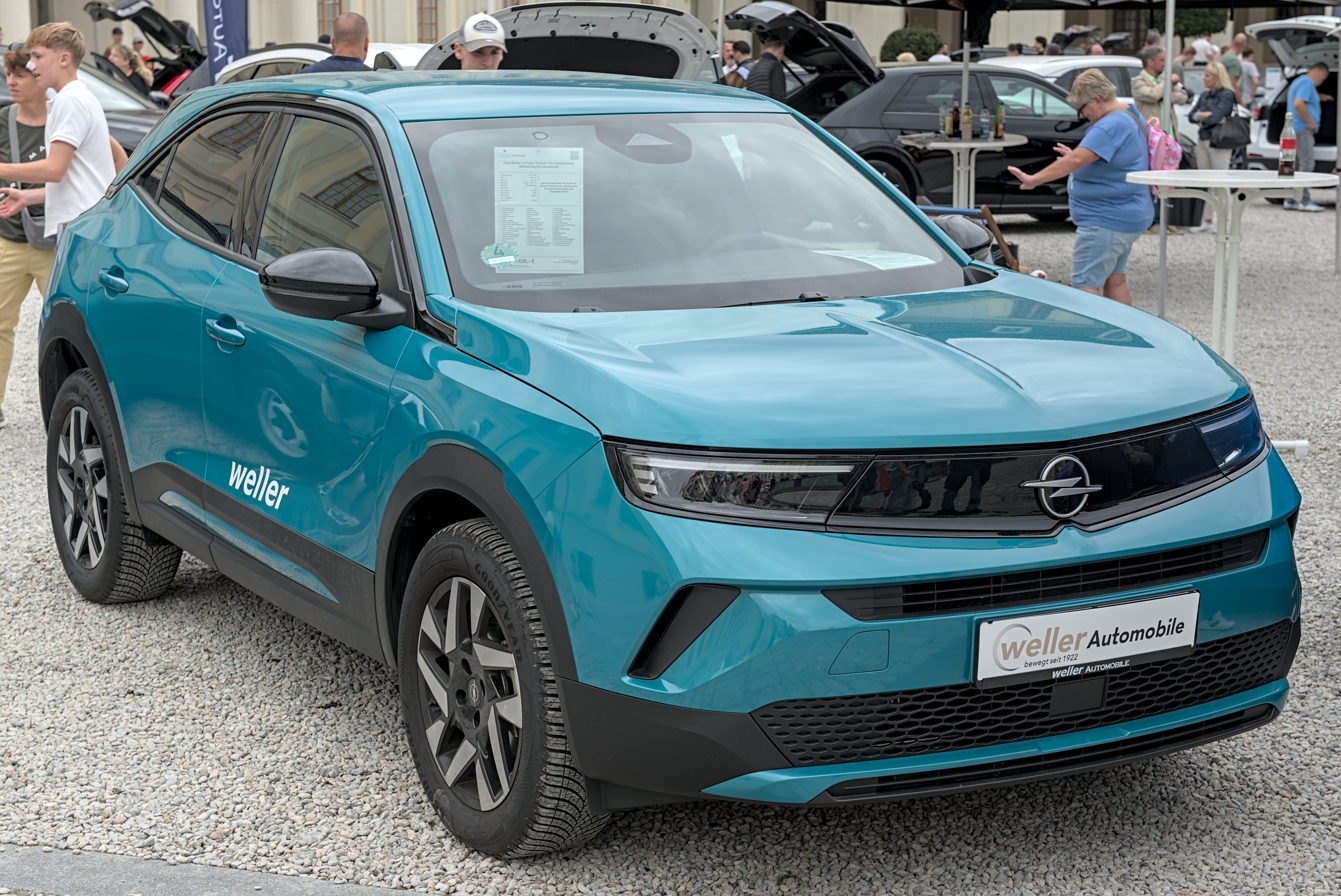
2025 Opel Mokka

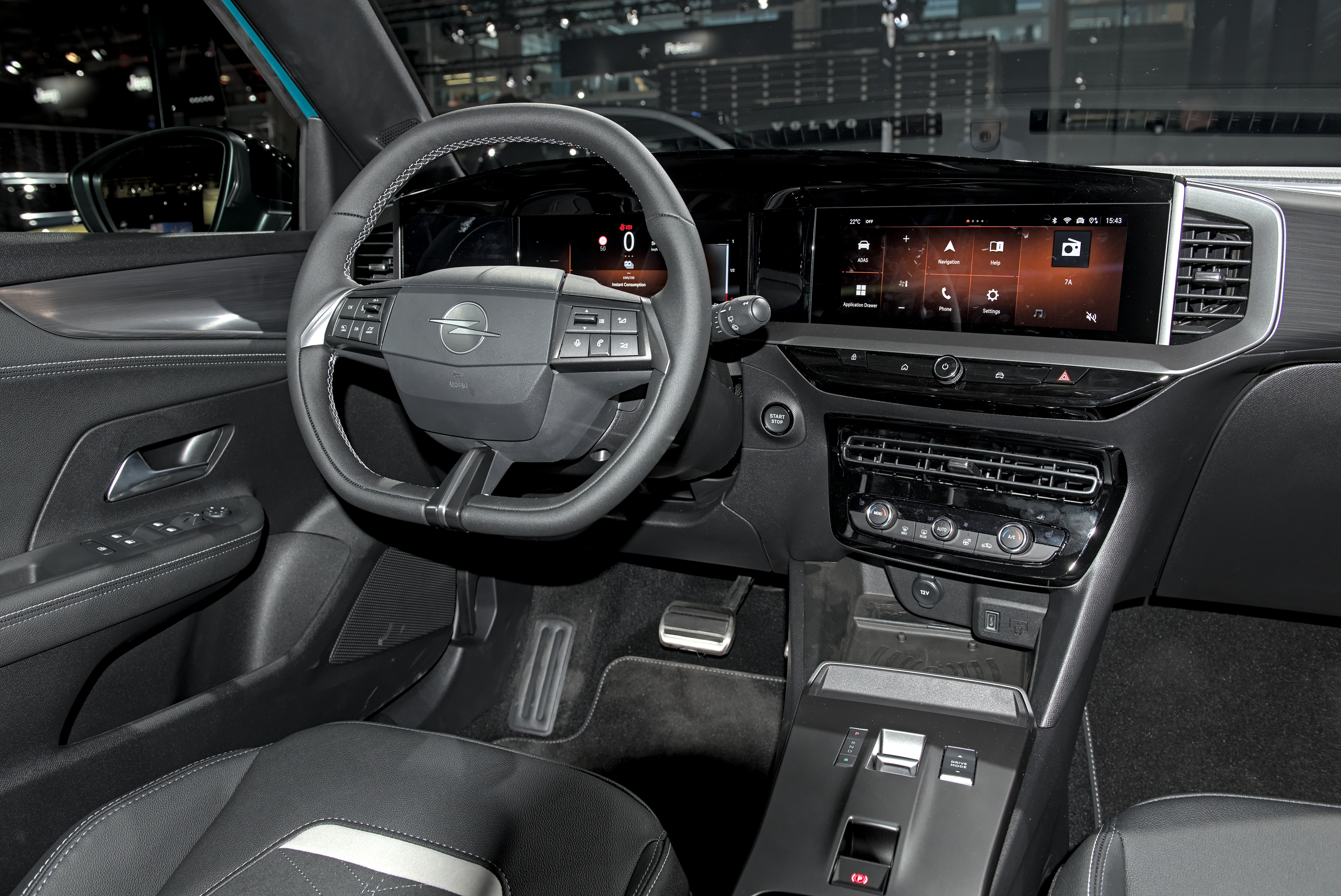
Interior (facelift)

=== Mokka GSE ===
The GSE sub-brand was teased in a press release on 14 May 2025; with the Mokka being the first vehicle to receive a GSE variant on 23 July 2025. It has a 207 kilowatts (281 PS; 278 hp) electric motor delivering 345 newton-metres (254 lb⋅ft) of torque, taking the car from 0–100 km/h (0–62 mph) in 5.9 seconds. The Mokka GSE has a top speed of 200 km/h (124 mph), making it the fastest all-electric production model Opel at the time of its reveal. The Mokka GSE is sold in the United Kingdom as the Vauxhall Mokka GSE.

==== Upgrades ====
The Mokka GSE features "aerodynamically optimised" 20-inch alloy wheels paired with 225/40 R20 Michelin Sport Pilot EV tyres as standard (optionally available are Goodyear Eagle F1 Asymmetrical 3 tyres). The front brakes are 380mm discs with 4-piston calipers. Rear brakes are 268mm discs.

The Mokka GSE features a "completely new steering rack" tuned by GSE. The new steering rack has a ratio of 14.5 (compared to 16.2 in the standard Mokka), with a turning circle of 10.41 metres (34.2 ft). Other upgrades include a 10mm lower ride height, a limited slip differential, and a "new rear axle design". The Mokka GSE is the only variant of the Mokka sold in the United Kingdom with the optional black bonnet.

=== Safety ===
==== ANCAP ====
ANCAP test results Opel Mokka all variants (2022, aligned with Euro NCAP)
Test	Points	%
Overall:	5 /5 stars	
Adult occupant:	28.91	76%
Child occupant:	37.96	77%
Pedestrian:	31.83	58%
Safety assist:	10.45	65%

==== Euro NCAP ====
Euro NCAP test results Opel/Vauxhall Mokka 1.2 petrol 'Elegance' (LHD) (2021)
Test	Points	%
Overall:	4 /5 stars	
Adult occupant:	27.9	73%
Child occupant:	37	75%
Pedestrian:	31.8	58%
Safety assist:	10.3	64%

=== Awards ===
In June 2022, the Mokka-e won Auto Trader UK's New Car Award for the Erin Baker Award. Auto Trader awarded the Mokka-e four stars out of five in its review of the car.

== Sales ==
Year	Europe (Note: Europe: 2020 EU 27 + UK + Switzerland + Norway + Iceland)	Turkey	Total Production
2012	5,475		
2013	70,768		
2014	127,437		
2015	163,246		
2016	164,340		
2017	169,886		
2018	120,537		
2019	79,693		
2020	136		
2021	70,313		82,277
2022	96,492	6,540	100,937
2023		15,982	99,995
2024		10,352	69,810
2025		6,498	
