= Opel Wien =

Austrian manufacturing company

Opel Wien GmbH
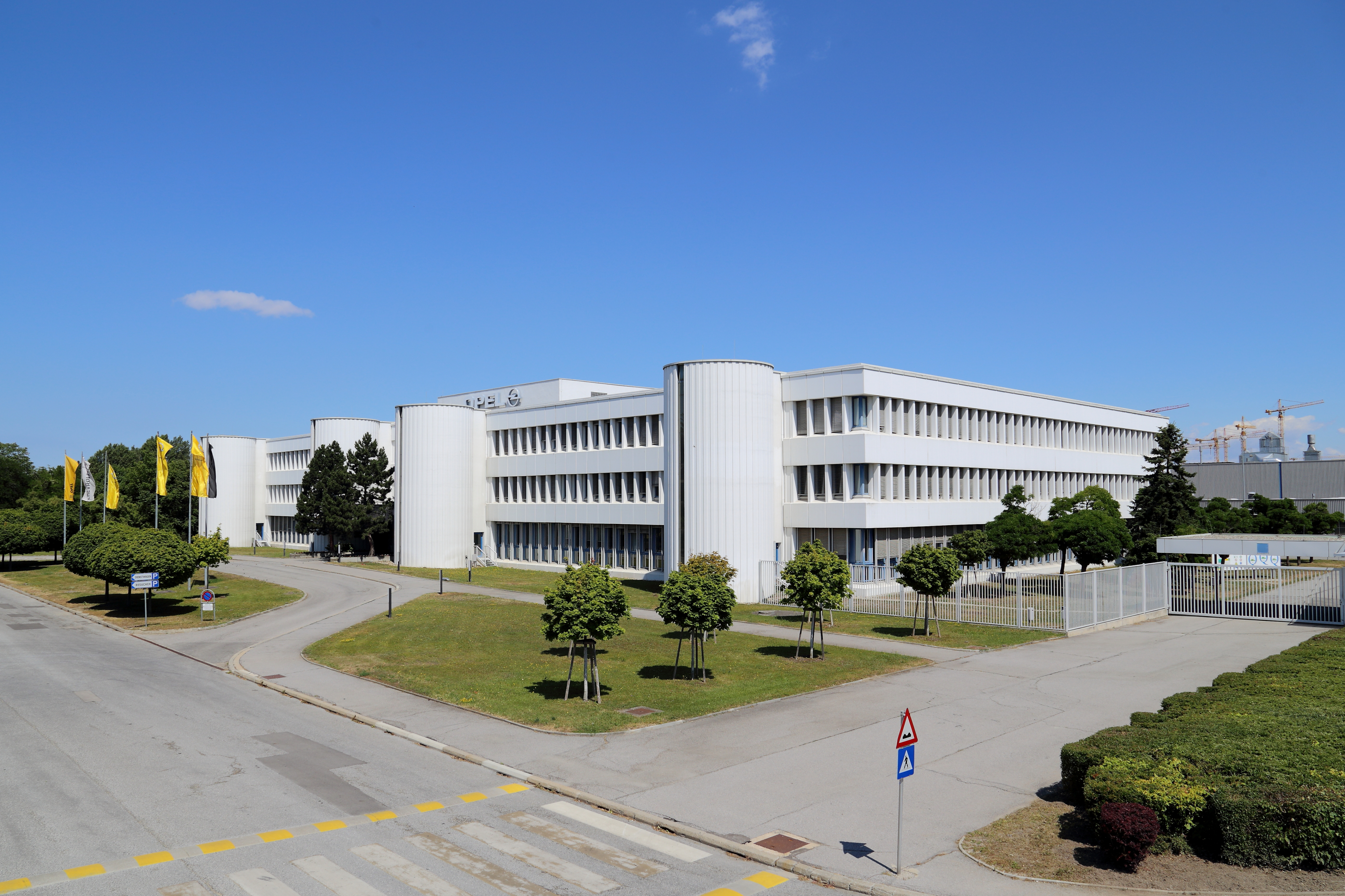
- Company type: GmbH
- Industry: Manufacturing
- Founded: 1982
- Defunct: 2024
- Headquarters: Vienna (Aspern), Austria
- Key people: Rafal Trojca, Chairman
- Products: Engines; Transmissions
- Owner: General Motors Company (1963–2017); Groupe PSA (2017–2021); Stellantis (2021–present)
- Number of employees: c.400
- Parent: Opel Group GmbH
- Website: www.opel-wien.at (German)

Opel Wien GmbH (formerly GM Powertrain Austria GmbH) is an Austrian automotive manufacturing company based in Aspern, Vienna. It was previously a subsidiary of General Motors; since 16 January 2021 it has been a part of Dutch-based multinational automotive manufacturer Stellantis.

== History ==
The Austrian Chancellor Dr. Bruno Kreisky and GM Austria Chairman Helmuth Schimpf signed a contract to build an engine plant in Vienna/Aspern on August 23, 1979. The investment amounted to over 9.8 billion Schilling.

== Products ==
The company produces Family 0 engines, 5 and 6-speed transmissions for Opel/Vauxhall and Chevrolet/Buick.

== See also ==
- List of GM engines
- List of GM transmissions
- Opel Eisenach
- IBC Vehicles
