= GM Family 0 engine =

Family 0
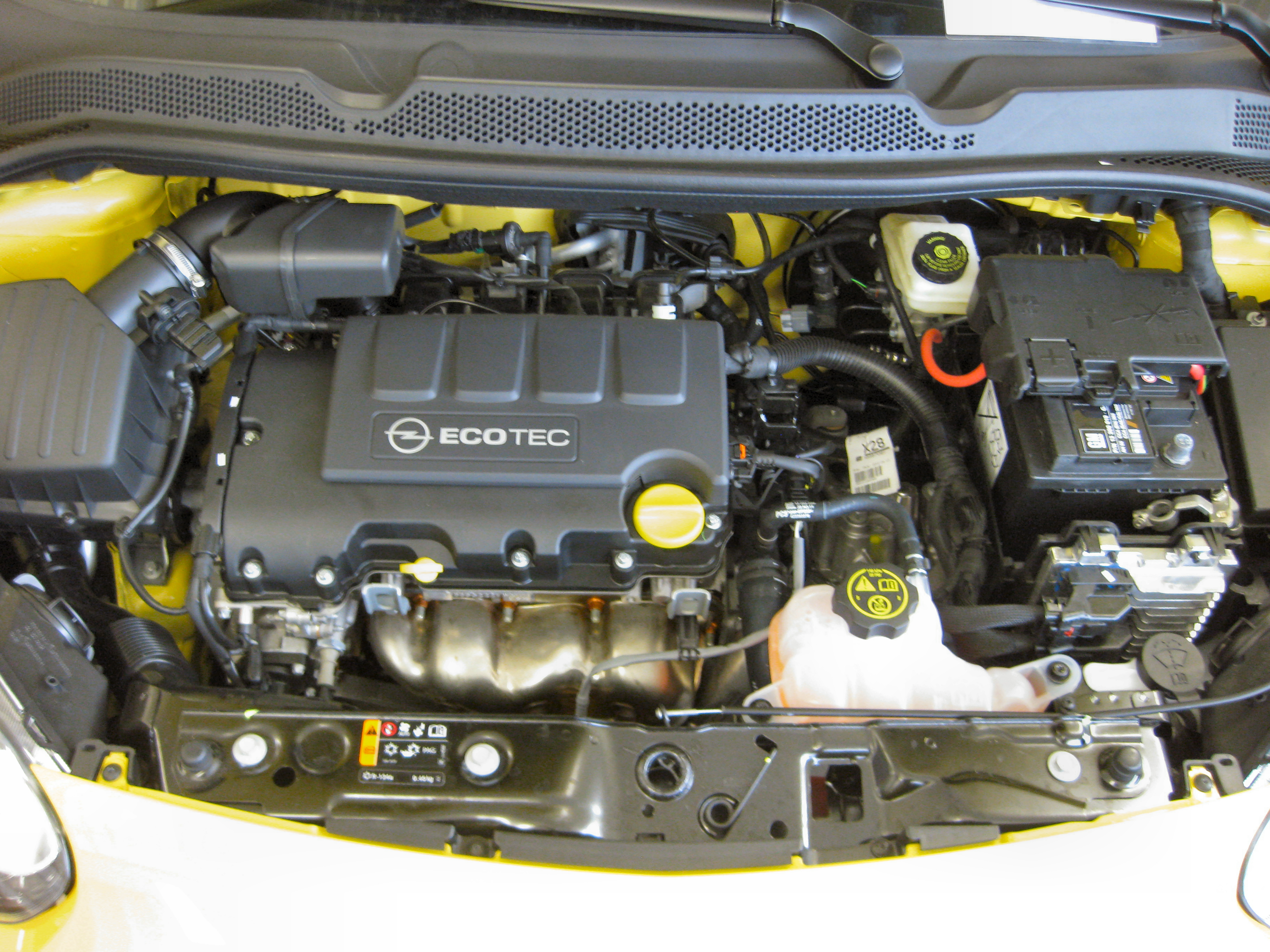
- Family 0 engine in an Opel Adam

Overview
- Manufacturer: General Motors
- Also called: Family Zero
- Production: 1996–2022

Layout
- Configuration: Straight-3, Straight-4
- Displacement: 973 cc (59.4 cu in); 998 cc (60.9 cu in); 1,199 cc (73.2 cu in); 1,229 cc (75.0 cu in); 1,364 cc (83.2 cu in); 1,398 cc (85.3 cu in)
- Cylinder bore: 72.5 mm (2.85 in); 73.4 mm (2.89 in)
- Piston stroke: 72.6 mm (2.86 in); 78.6 mm (3.09 in); 80.6 mm (3.17 in); 82.6 mm (3.25 in)
- Cylinder block material: Cast iron
- Cylinder head material: Aluminium
- Valvetrain: DOHC 4 valves x cyl. with VVT
- Compression ratio: 9.5:1, 10.1:1, 10.5:1

Combustion
- Fuel system: Sequential MPFI
- Fuel type: Gasoline, E85
- Oil system: Wet sump
- Cooling system: Water-cooled

Output
- Power output: 55–150 PS (40–110 kW)
- Torque output: 82–220 N⋅m (60–162 lb⋅ft)

Chronology
- Predecessor: Opel OHV engine; GM Family 1 engine (1.0 – 1.4L)
- Successor: Small Gasoline Engine

The Family 0 is a family of inline piston engines that was developed by Opel, at the time a subsidiary of General Motors. It was developed as a low-displacement engine for use on entry-level subcompact cars from Opel/Vauxhall.

These engines feature a light-weight cast-iron semi-closed deck engine block with an aluminum cylinder head. The valvetrain consists of chain-driven hollowcast dual overhead camshafts (DOHC) that actuate 4-valves per cylinder via roller finger followers with hydraulic tappets. These engines also feature a 78 mm (3.1 in) bore spacing and fracture-split connecting rods.

Later versions also incorporate a variable length intake manifold (VLIM) and variable valve timing (VVT).

Originally debuting as either a 1.0 L (973 cc) straight-3 or 1.2 L (1,199 cc) straight-4; a 1.4 L (1,364 cc) I4 variant was added with the introduction of the second generation, replacing the 1.4 L Family 1 engine. The Family 0 engines were produced by Opel Wien in Vienna/Aspern (Austria), by GM in Bupyeong (Korea) and Flint (Michigan, USA).

== Generation I ==
The engine was first introduced in the 1996 Opel Corsa, either as a three-cylinder or as a four-cylinder version. This was Opel's first three-cylinder engine.

Name	Configuration	Bore	Stroke	CR	Power	Torque
X10XE	1.0 L (973 cc) I3	72.5 mm (2.9 in)	78.6 mm (3.1 in)	10.1:1	40 kW (55 PS)	82 N⋅m (60 lb⋅ft) at 2800 rpm
Z10XE	1.0 L (973 cc) I3	72.5 mm (2.9 in)	78.6 mm (3.1 in)		43 kW (58 PS)	85 N⋅m (63 lb⋅ft)
X12XE	1.2 L (1,199 cc) I4	72.5 mm (2.9 in)	72.6 mm (2.9 in)	10.1:1	48 kW (65 PS) at 5600 rpm	110 N⋅m (81 lb⋅ft) at 4000 rpm
Z12XE	1.2 L (1,199 cc) I4	72.5 mm (2.9 in)	72.6 mm (2.9 in)	10.1:1	55 kW (75 PS) at 5600 rpm	110 N⋅m (81 lb⋅ft) at 4000 rpm

Applications:

- 1996–2000 Opel/Vauxhall Corsa B
- 1998–2003 Opel/Vauxhall Astra G
- 2000–2004 Opel/Vauxhall Corsa C
- 2000–2004 Opel/Vauxhall Agila

== Generation II ==
The second generation Family 0 began production in November 2002. It is an updated version of the Family 0 engine and features TwinPort technology – twin intake ports with a choke closing one of the ports at low RPM, providing strong air swirl pattern for higher torque levels and better fuel economy. The crankshaft and oil galleries were also redesigned to lower power loss; thereby increasing fuel economy.

Name	Configuration	Bore	Stroke	CR	Power	Torque
Z10XEP	1.0 L (998 cc) I3	73.4 mm (2.9 in)	78.6 mm (3.1 in)	10.5:1	44 kW (60 PS) at 5600 rpm	88 N⋅m (65 lb⋅ft) at 3800 rpm
Z12XEP	1.2 L (1,229 cc) I4	73.4 mm (2.9 in)	72.6 mm (2.9 in)	10.5:1	59 kW (80 PS) at 5600 rpm	110 N⋅m (81 lb⋅ft) at 4000 rpm
Z14XEP	1.4 L (1,364 cc) I4	73.4 mm (2.9 in)	80.6 mm (3.2 in)	10.5:1	66 kW (90 PS) at 5600 rpm	125 N⋅m (92 lb⋅ft) at 4000 rpm

Applications:

- 2003–2010 Opel/Vauxhall Combo C
- 2003–2006 Opel/Vauxhall Corsa C/Holden Barina (XC)
- 2003–2007 Opel/Vauxhall Agila
- 2004–2009 Opel/Vauxhall Tigra TwinTop
- 2004–2010 Opel/Vauxhall Astra H
- 2004–2010 Opel/Vauxhall Meriva A
- 2005–2009 Opel/Vauxhall Astra G Classic models
- 2006–2014 Opel/Vauxhall Corsa D

== Generation III ==
The EcoFlex engine is a version of the TwinPort tuned to provide better fuel economy and lower emissions. The 1.4 L engine was introduced in 2008 and the 1.0 L engine in 2010. For model year 2012, the EcoFlex engines have been updated with dual continuous variable cam phasing (DCVCP) in a Gen III block.

Certain Opel and US-market Chevrolet versions of the Delta II platform compact cars use a turbocharged version of the 1.4 L engine with dual continuous variable cam phasing (DCVCP); in the future, an optional gasoline direct injection system will be introduced. Opel versions feature a start-stop system from 2011 and a Gen III block; a lower-power 120 PS (88 kW; 118 hp) version has been introduced as well. For model year 2013, the overboost to 220 N⋅m (162 lb⋅ft) has been added.

Name	Configuration	Bore	Stroke	CR	Power	Torque
A10XEP (LDB)	1.0 L (998 cc) I3	73.4 mm (2.9 in)	78.6 mm (3.1 in)	10.5:1	48 kW (65 PS) at 5300 rpm	90 N⋅m (66 lb⋅ft) at 4000 rpm
A12XEL (LWD)	1.2 L (1,229 cc) I4	73.4 mm (2.9 in)	72.6 mm (2.9 in)	10.5:1	51 kW (70 PS) at 5600 rpm	115 N⋅m (85 lb⋅ft) at 4000 rpm
A12XER (LDC)	1.2 L (1,229 cc) I4	73.4 mm (2.9 in)	72.6 mm (2.9 in)	10.5:1	62 kW (84 PS) at 5600 rpm	115 N⋅m (85 lb⋅ft) at 4000 rpm
A14XFL (LUU)	1.4 L (1,398 cc) I4	73.4 mm (2.9 in)	82.6 mm (3.3 in)	10.5:1	63 kW (85 PS) at 4800 rpm	126 N⋅m (93 lb⋅ft) at 4800 rpm
A14XEL (L2Z)	1.4 L (1,398 cc) I4	73.4 mm (2.9 in)	82.6 mm (3.3 in)	10.5:1	64 kW (87 PS) at 6000 rpm	130 N⋅m (96 lb⋅ft) at 4000 rpm
A14XER (LDD)	1.4 L (1,398 cc) I4	73.4 mm (2.9 in)	82.6 mm (3.3 in)	10.5:1	74 kW (100 PS) at 6000 rpm	130 N⋅m (96 lb⋅ft) at 4000 rpm
A14XFR (L2N)	1.4 L (1,398 cc) I4	73.4 mm (2.9 in)	82.6 mm (3.3 in)	10.5:1	74 kW (100 PS) at 6000 rpm	130 N⋅m (96 lb⋅ft) at 4000 rpm
A14NEL/B14NEL (LUH)	1.4 L (1,364 cc) I4 turbo	72.5 mm (2.85 in)	82.6 mm (3.3 in)	9.5:1	88 kW (120 PS) at 4800–6000 rpm	200 N⋅m (148 lb⋅ft) at 1850–4200 rpm; 220 N⋅m (162 lb⋅ft) (Overboost)
A14NET (LUJ)	1.4 L (1,364 cc) I4 turbo	72.5 mm (2.85 in)	82.6 mm (3.3 in)	9.5:1	103 kW (140 PS) at 4900–6000 rpm	200 N⋅m (148 lb⋅ft) at 1850–4900 rpm; 220 N⋅m (162 lb⋅ft) (Overboost)
U14NFT (LUJ)	1.4 L (1,364 cc) I4 turbo	72.5 mm (2.85 in)	82.6 mm (3.3 in)	9.5:1	103 kW (140 PS) at 4900–6000 rpm	200 N⋅m (148 lb⋅ft) at 1850–4900 rpm; 220 N⋅m (162 lb⋅ft) (Overboost)
U14NFT (LUV)	1.4 L (1,364 cc) I4 turbo	72.5 mm (2.85 in)	82.6 mm (3.3 in)	9.5:1	103 kW (140 PS) at 4900 rpm	200 N⋅m (148 lb⋅ft) at 1850 or 2500 rpm
B14NEH (LUJ)	1.4 L (1,364 cc) I4 turbo	72.5 mm (2.85 in)	82.6 mm (3.3 in)	9.5:1	110 kW (150 PS) at 4900–5500 rpm	220 N⋅m (162 lb⋅ft) at 2750–4500 rpm

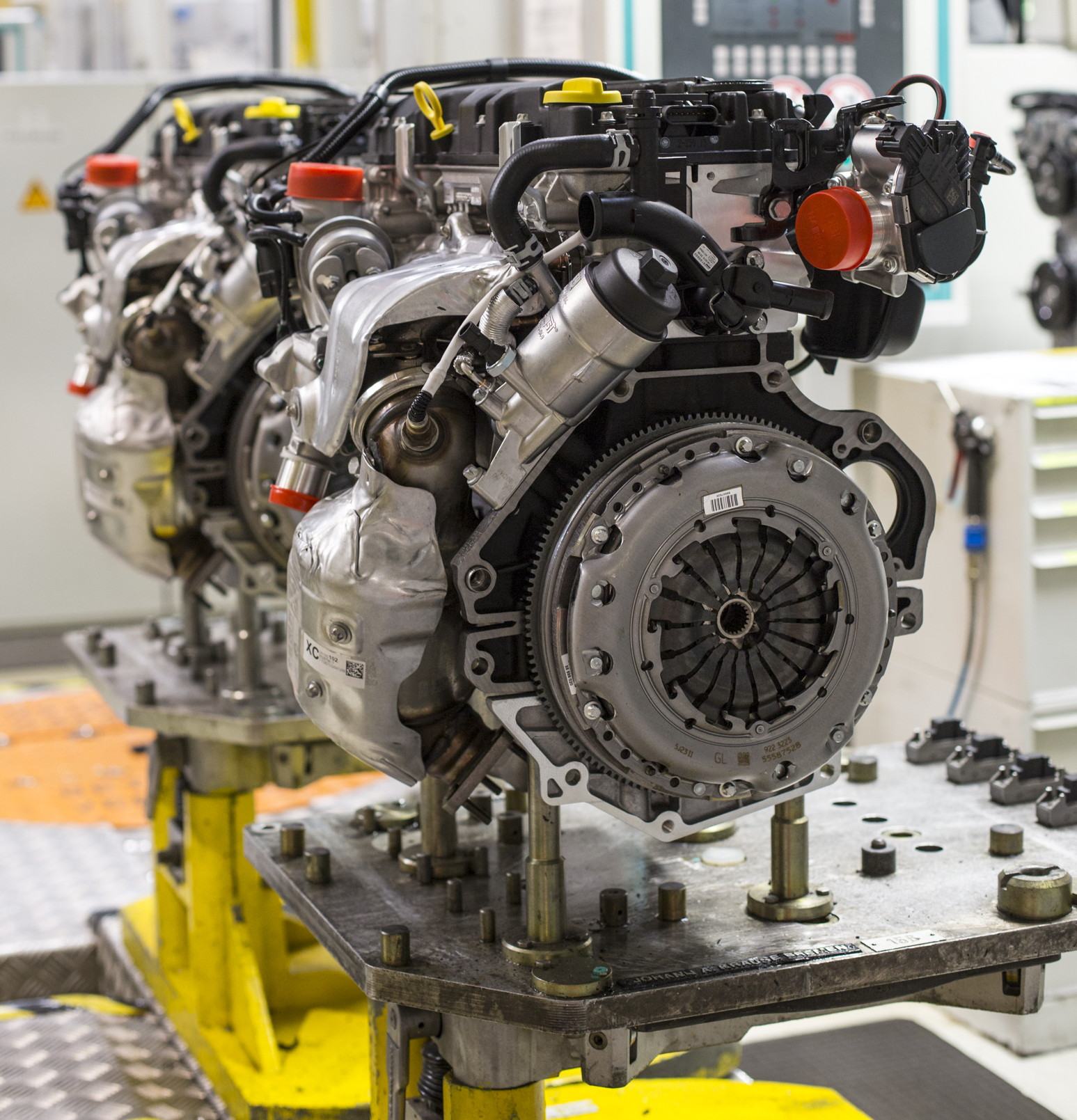
Turbo engine in production

Applications:

- 2009–2015 Opel/Vauxhall Astra J
- 2010–2015 Chevrolet Volt / Opel/Vauxhall Ampera
- 2010–2017 Opel/Vauxhall Meriva B
- 2011–2019 Opel/Vauxhall Corsa
- 2011–2019 Opel/Vauxhall Zafira Tourer
- 2011–2015 Chevrolet Cruze, 2016 Chevrolet Cruze Limited
- 2012–2020 Chevrolet Aveo/Sonic
- 2013–2019 Opel Adam
- 2013–2016 Cadillac ELR
- 2013–2022 Buick Encore / Opel Mokka
- 2014–2022 Chevrolet/Holden Trax
- 2013–2015 Chevrolet Spin
- 2016–2022 Roewe e950
- 2017–2019 Vanderhall Venice
