= Chevrolet Spin =

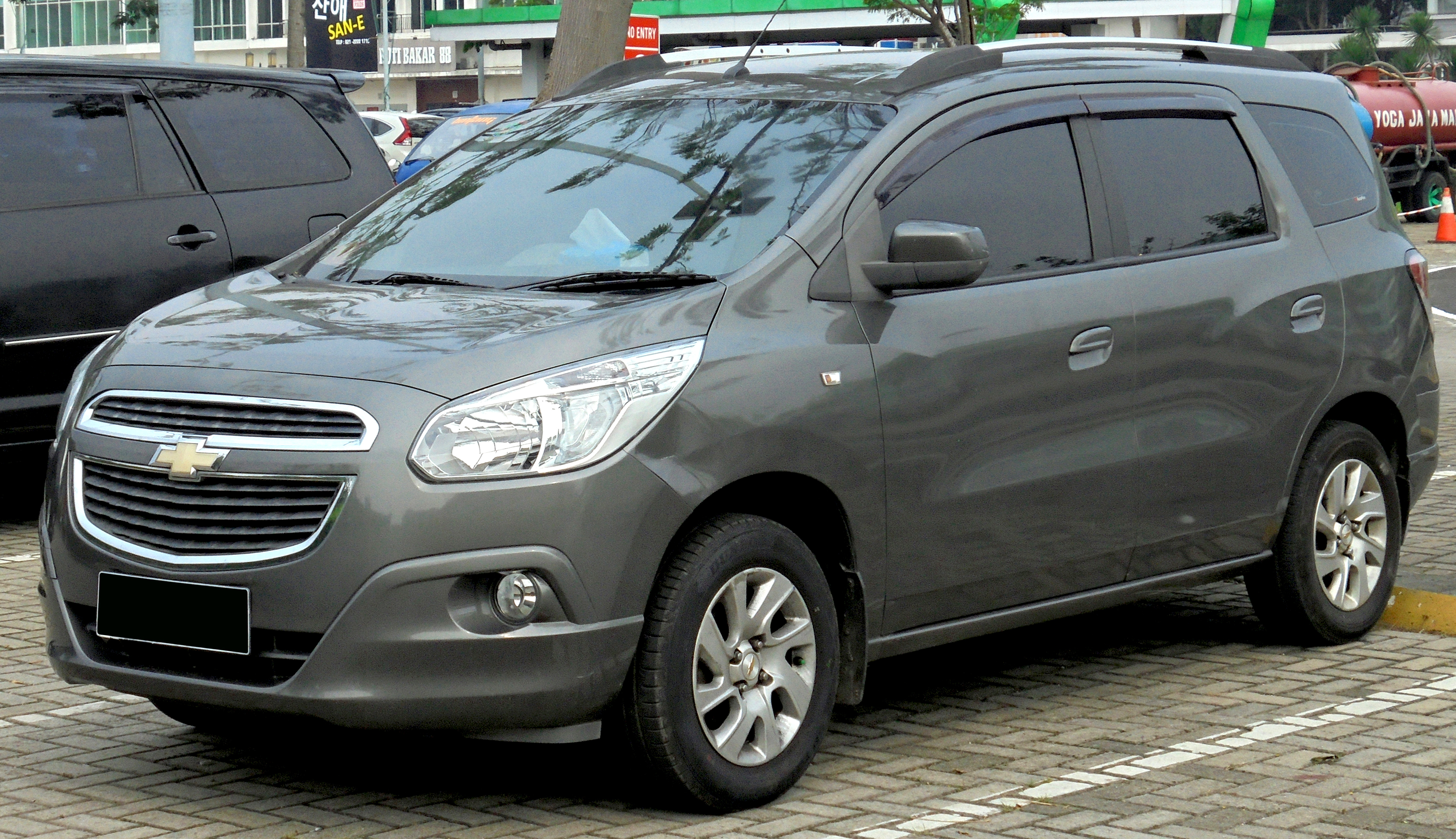
- 2013 Chevrolet Spin 1.5 LTZ (Indonesia)

Overview
- Manufacturer: General Motors
- Production: June 2012 – present (Brazil); February 2013 – June 2015 (Indonesia)
- Assembly: Brazil: São Caetano do Sul (GM do Brasil); Indonesia: Bekasi, West Java (GM Indonesia)
- Designer: Matt Noone (exterior); Dagoberto Tribia (interior)

Body and chassis
- Class: Mini MPV
- Body style: 5-door wagon
- Layout: Front-engine, front-wheel-drive
- Platform: GM Gamma II platform
- Related: Chevrolet Cobalt

Powertrain
- Engine: Petrol: 1.2 L A12XER I4 (Indonesia); 1.5 L L2B S-TEC III I4 (Southeast Asia); 1.8 L N18XFH I4 flex-fuel (South America); Diesel: 1.3 L Smartech/SDE TDCI I4
- Transmission: 5-speed GM F17 manual 6-speed GM 6T30 automatic 6-speed GM GF6 automatic (1.8)

Dimensions
- Wheelbase: 2,620 mm (103.1 in)
- Length: 4,360 mm (171.7 in)
- Width: 1,735 mm (68.3 in)
- Height: 1,664 mm (65.5 in)

Chronology
- Predecessor: Chevrolet Meriva; Chevrolet Zafira; Chevrolet Tavera (Indonesia)

The Chevrolet Spin is a mini MPV produced by General Motors under the Chevrolet marque. Developed by GM do Brasil, the vehicle replaced the Meriva and Zafira in South America with an option of two-row and three-row seating. It is produced in Brazil since 2012 and has been exported throughout the South American region. Between 2013 and 2015, GM Indonesia assembled the vehicle for the Southeast Asian market at its Bekasi plant.

== Overview ==
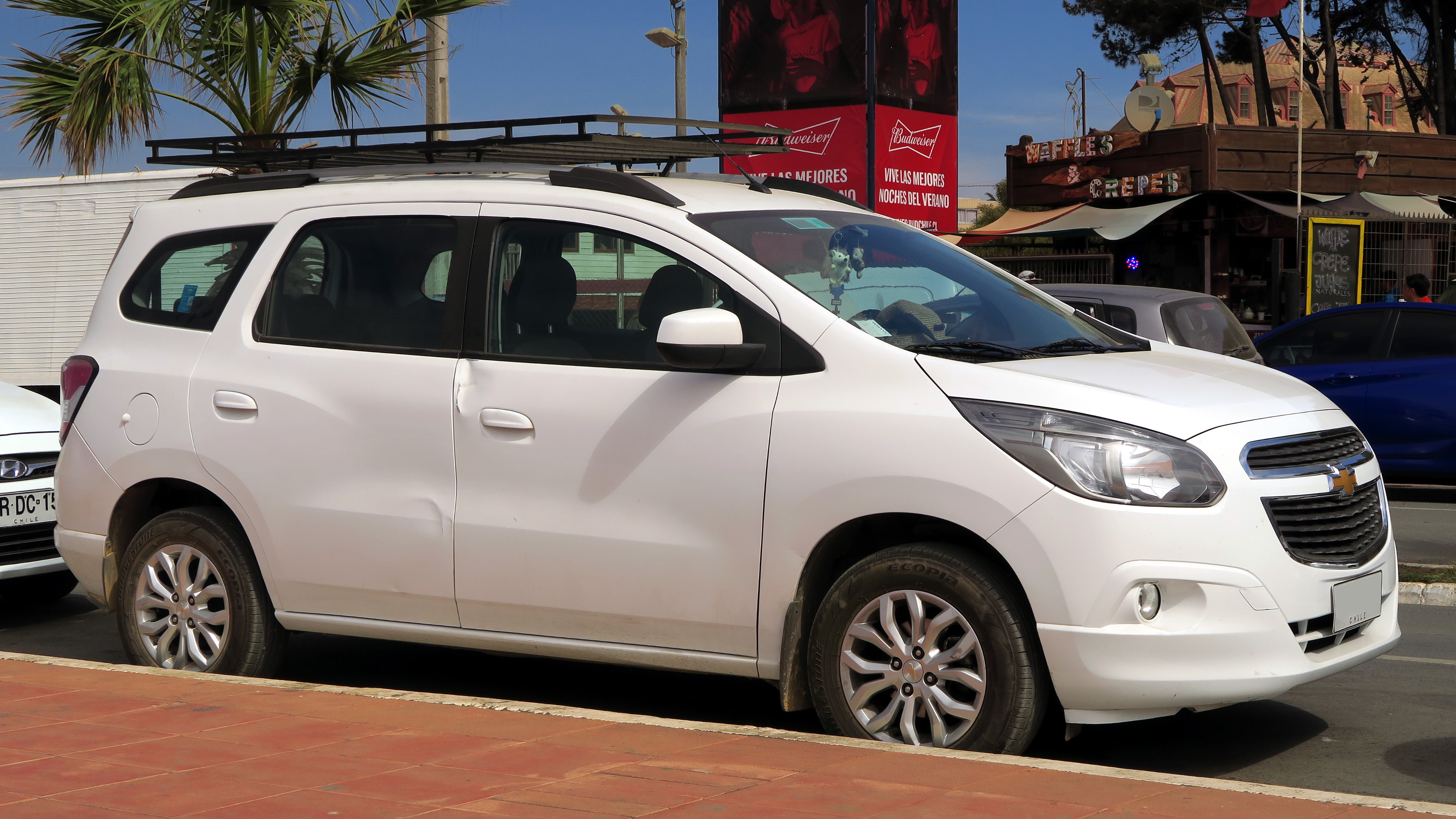
2018 Chevrolet Spin 1.8 LTZ (Chile)

The Spin was mainly designed and engineered in Brazil by GM Brasil Centro Tecnológico São Caetano do Sul. During development, it was known as the PM5/PM7 project. The vehicle is developed to replace both the Chevrolet Meriva and Chevrolet Zafira in South America which was developed by Opel. It is built on the same platform as the Brazilian Chevrolet Cobalt.

Developed with a goal of a large cabin space, the vehicle is built on a 2,620 mm (103.1 in)-long wheelbase which is shared with the Cobalt. For three-row models, the seats are arranged in a "theatre" format in which the rear seats are positioned higher than the front seats, allowing for better visibility for rear passengers. With all seats in place, the luggage capacity of the three-row Spin is 162 L, and with the third row seat folded it has 553 L of space. Two-row models have 710 L of cargo space. A total of 23 seat arrangements are possible.

The Spin has been produced since 2012 at the General Motors do Brasil plant in São Caetano do Sul, Brazil. It was also produced in Indonesia between 2013 and 2015 at the GM Indonesia plant in Bekasi, West Java. Production in Indonesia had started in February 2013. In late June 2015, GM ended the production of the Spin in Indonesia and shut down the Bekasi plant due to low demand and high manufacturing costs.

== Markets ==
=== Brazil ===
The Spin was revealed in June 2012 for the Brazilian market. Offered in LT and LTZ trims, the LTZ trim offered an optional third-row seating to serve as the replacement to the Zafira. It is solely powered by the 1.8-liter EconoFlex engine capable of 108 hp (109 PS; 81 kW) and 171 N⋅m (17.4 kg⋅m; 126 lb⋅ft) of torque. Transmission options include a 5-speed manual and 6-speed GF6 automatic from the Cruze. GM targeted a monthly sales of 2,800 units for the market.

In November 2014, the Brazilian market received the crossover-inspired Activ trim. Along with decorative side claddings and restyled bumpers, the ground clearance had been lifted by 8 mm (0.3 in), and it is equipped with an rear-mounted external spare tyre similar to SUVs.

A revised version was released in March 2015 for the 2016 model year, which gained revised interior colour scheme and an updated automatic transmission.

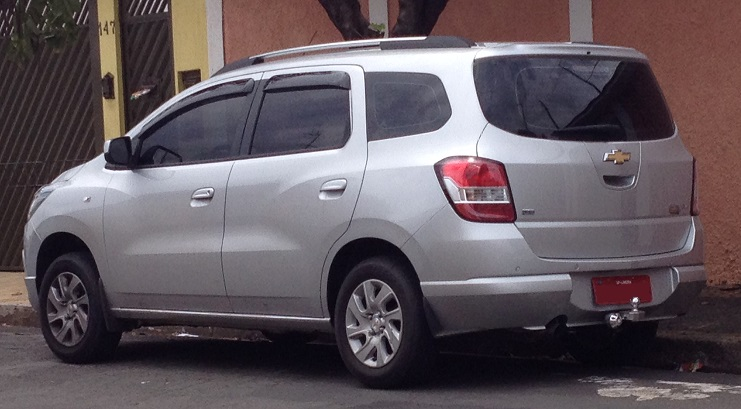
Spin 1.8 LTZ (Brazil)

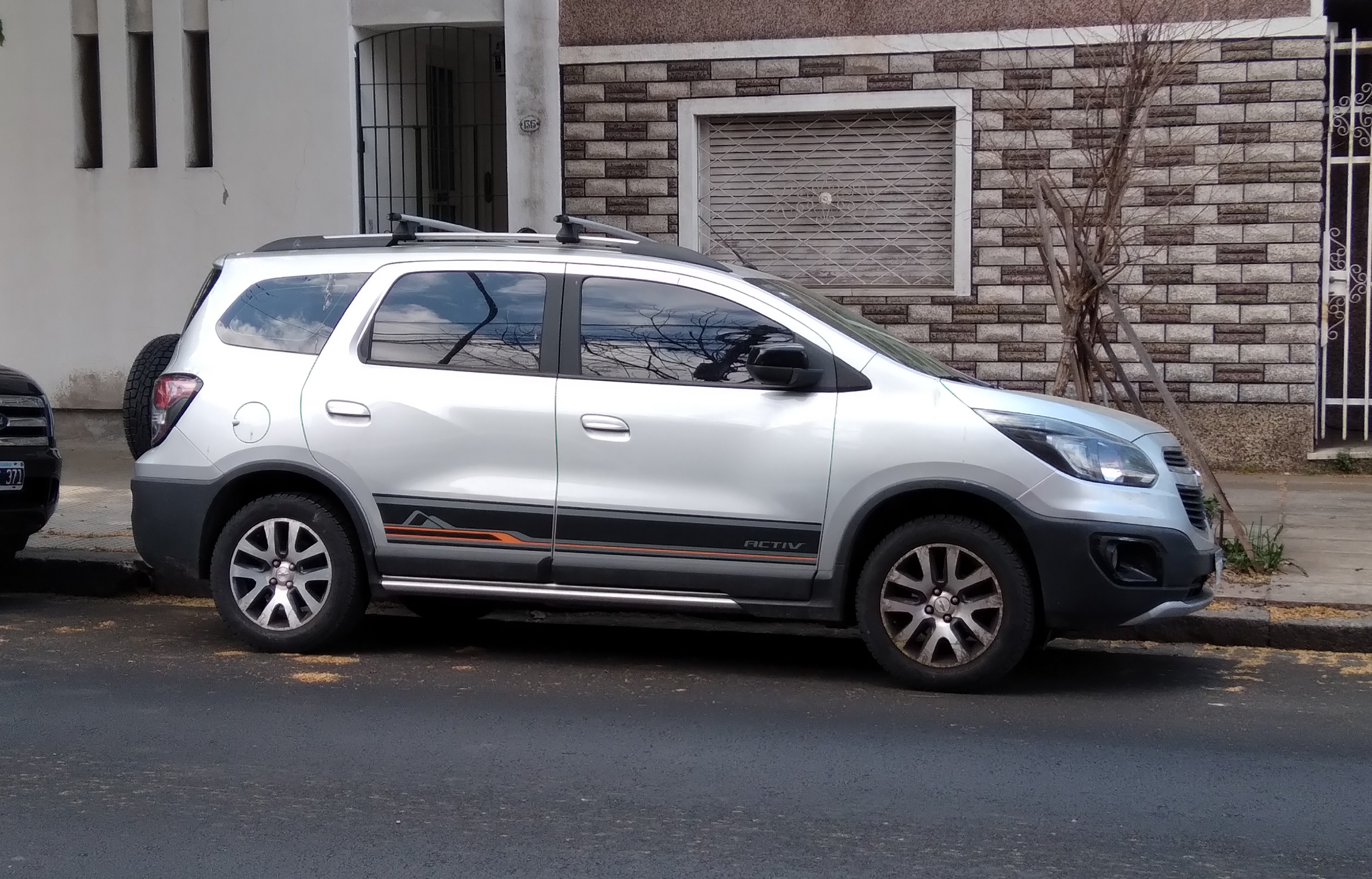
Spin Activ

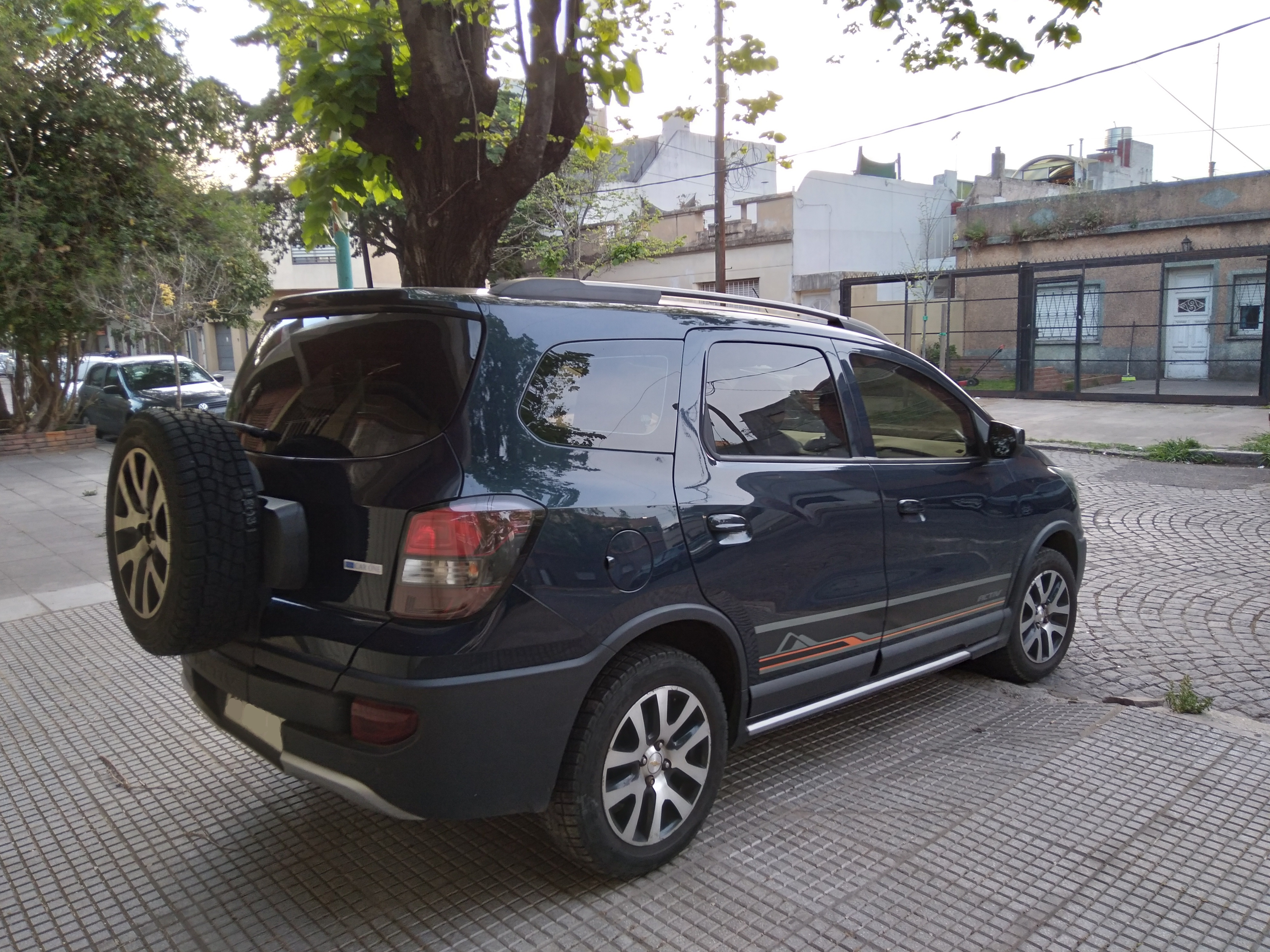
Spin Activ (rear view)

=== Argentina ===
The Spin was released in Argentina in March 2013. Produced in Brazil, the Spin in Argentina is available in LT, LTZ and Activ trim levels. Engine options available are the EconoFlex 1.8-litre petrol engine along with the Fiat-sourced 1.3-litre Multijet turbodiesel engine. The diesel engine was only available for the LTZ trim for both five-seater and seven-seater models.

=== Indonesia ===
The Spin was introduced in Indonesia in February 2013. The Indonesian version was locally assembled, offering a standard three-row seating and third row ventilation in all models.

Three trim levels and three engine options were offered at launch. The base engine is a 1.2-litre A12XER petrol engine sourced from Opel which was available for the LS and LT trims, with a 5-speed manual transmission. The 1.5-litre petrol engine was offered for all trims and was available with 5-speed manual and 6-speed automatic. A 1.3-litre Multijet turbodiesel engine sourced from Fiat and branded as TDCi was also available. It produced 75 PS (74 hp; 55 kW) and 190 N⋅m (19.4 kg⋅m; 140 lb⋅ft) and was paired with 5-speed manual transmission for all trims.

In April 2014, GM Indonesia introduced the Activ trim level which was only available with the 1.5-litre engine with the 6-speed automatic transmission. It is similar to the Brazilian-market Spin Activ sans the rear-mounted external spare tyre and the 16-inch dual-tone wheels. The trim also gained steering audio controls, along with black-coloured seats.

Production ended in July 2015, with remaining inventory sold out by May 2016.

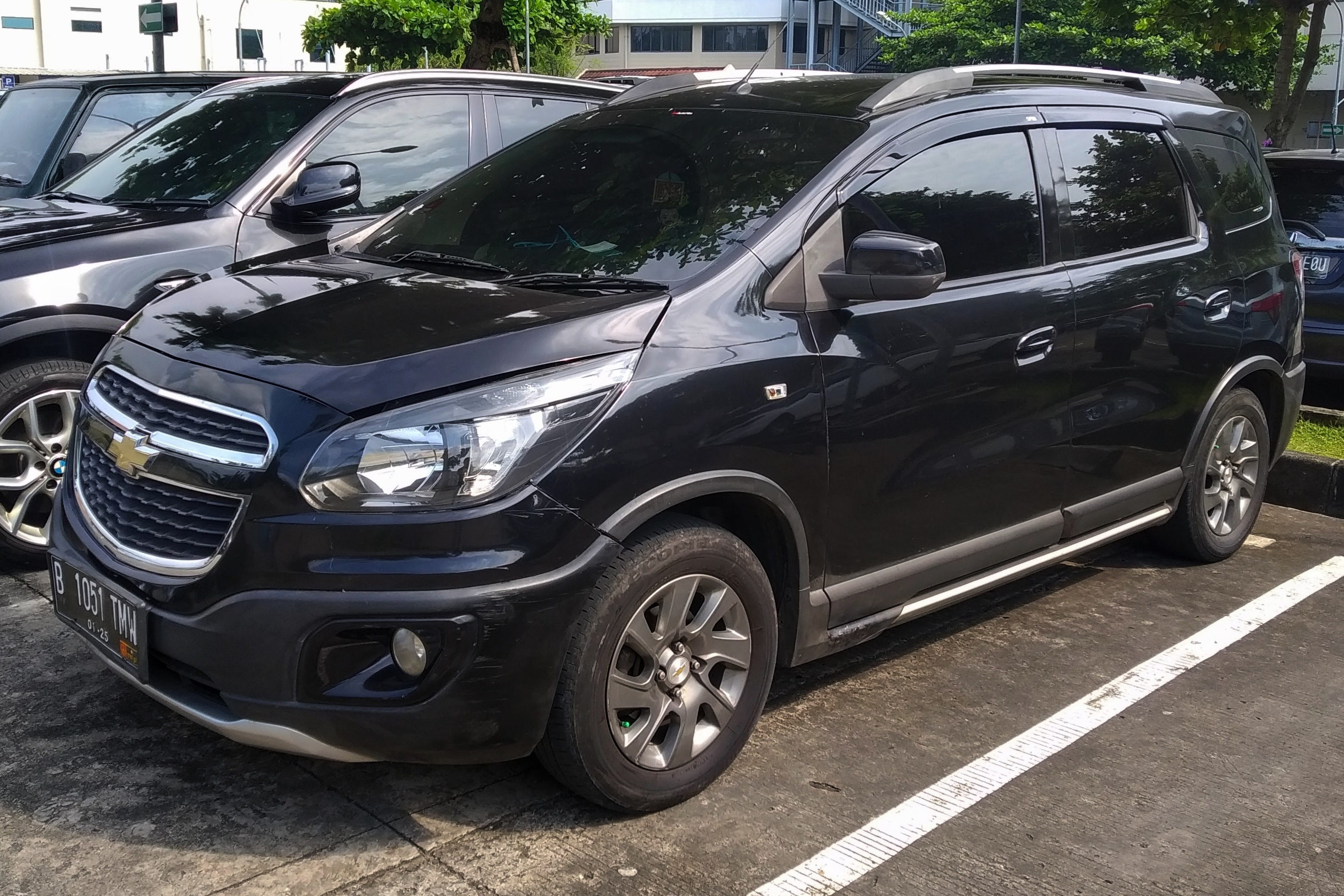
Chevrolet Spin Activ (Indonesia)

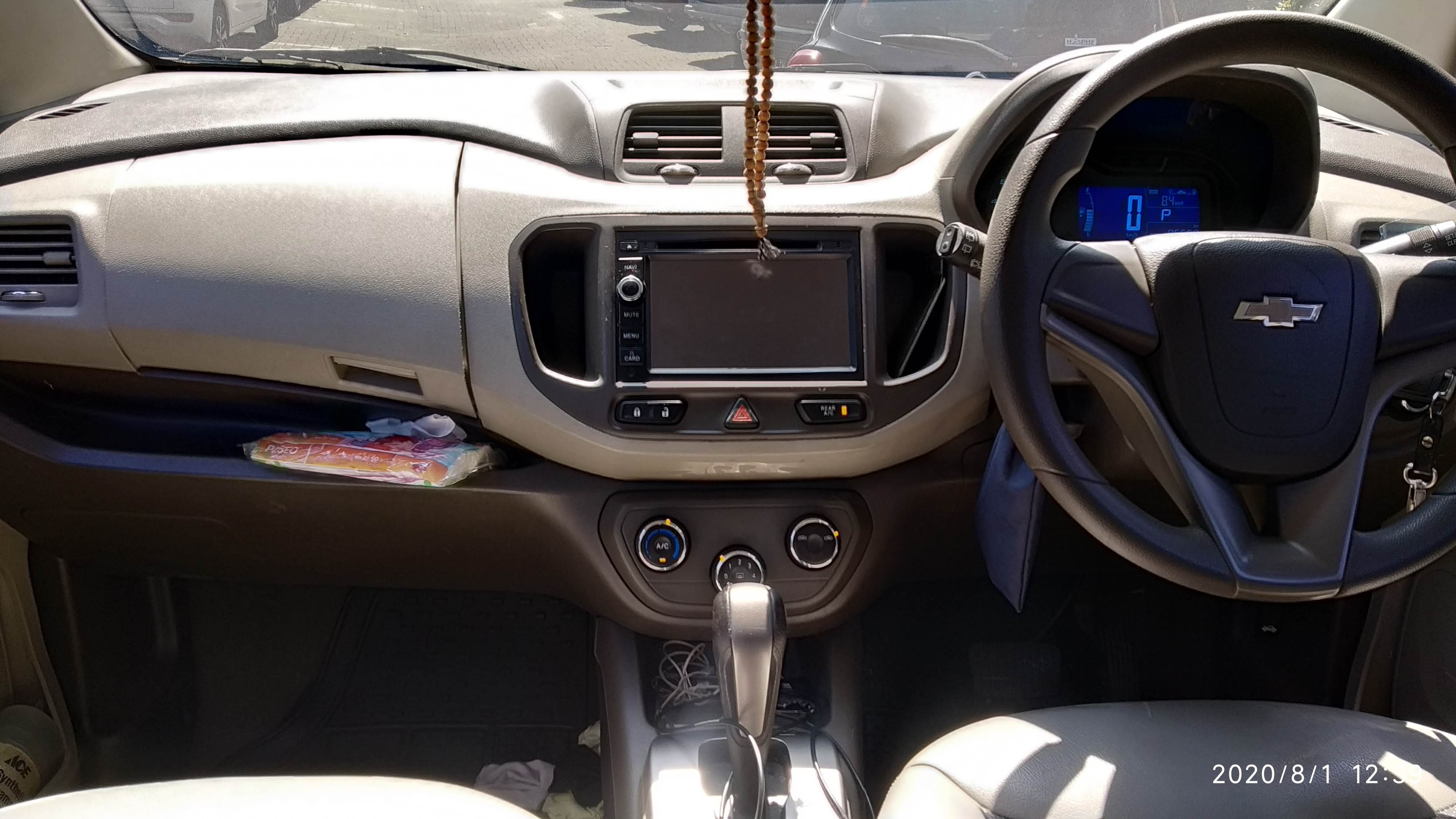
Interior, with an aftermarket monitor entertainment system

=== Thailand ===
The Spin was introduced in Thailand in April 2013. Imported from Indonesia, it was offered in a sole LTZ trim with the 1.5-litre engine and automatic transmission.

=== Philippines ===
The Spin was unveiled in the Philippines in July 2013 and went on sale the following month. It was introduced with three trim levels, which are 1.3-litre Turbo Diesel, 1.3-litre Turbo Diesel LTZ and 1.5-litre LTZ petrol. It was sourced from the Indonesian plant.

== Facelifts ==
=== First facelift ===
The first facelift Spin was launched in June 2018 in Argentina and in July 2018 for the Brazilian market. The new Spin received a restyled front fascia and rear fascia, along with a revised dashboard and the removal of digital instrument cluster. Several new safety features were introduced such as three-point seatbelt, headrest for the central second row passenger and ISOFIX. According to GM, improvements were made in the calibration of the automatic gearbox to optimize gear changes, allowing for quicker acceleration. Trim levels available in Brazil are LS, LT, LTZ, and Activ7.

For the 2020 model year, the LTZ trim was renamed to Premier. The 2021 model year gained standard stability control and hill start assist, front seatbelt warning, a revised instrument cluster design, and a new automatic gearbox.

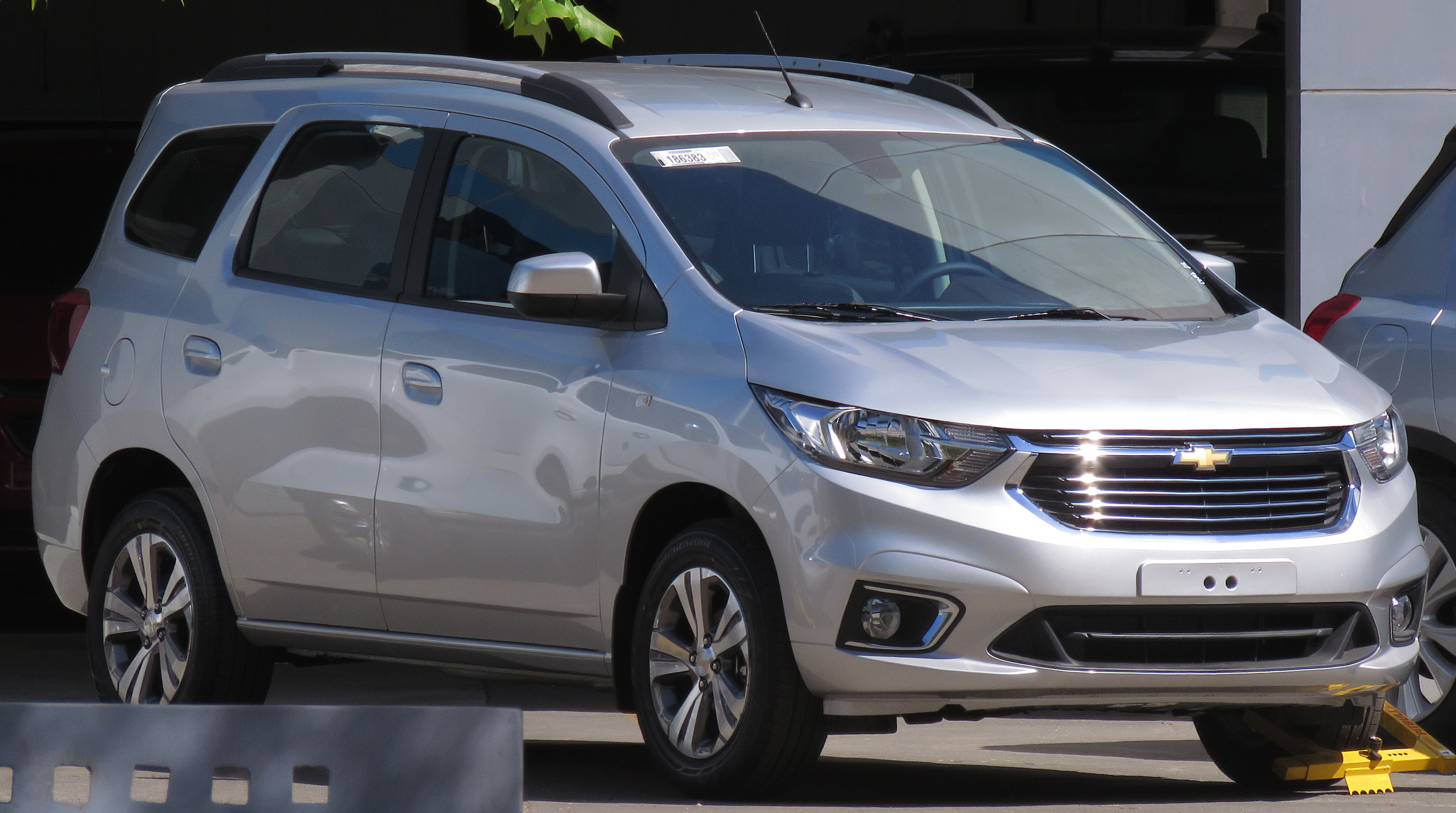
2019 Spin LTZ (facelift)

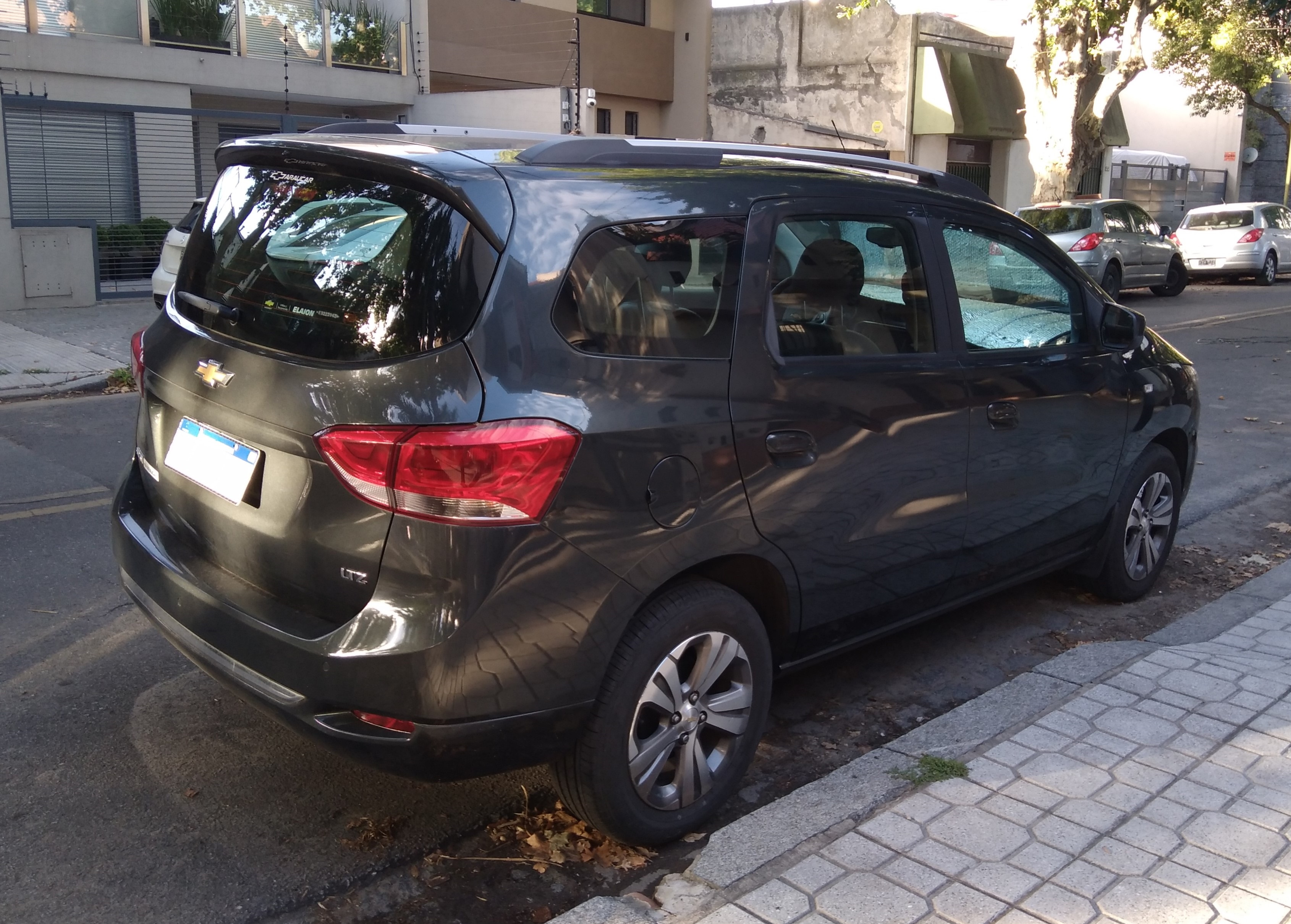
Rear view

=== Second facelift ===
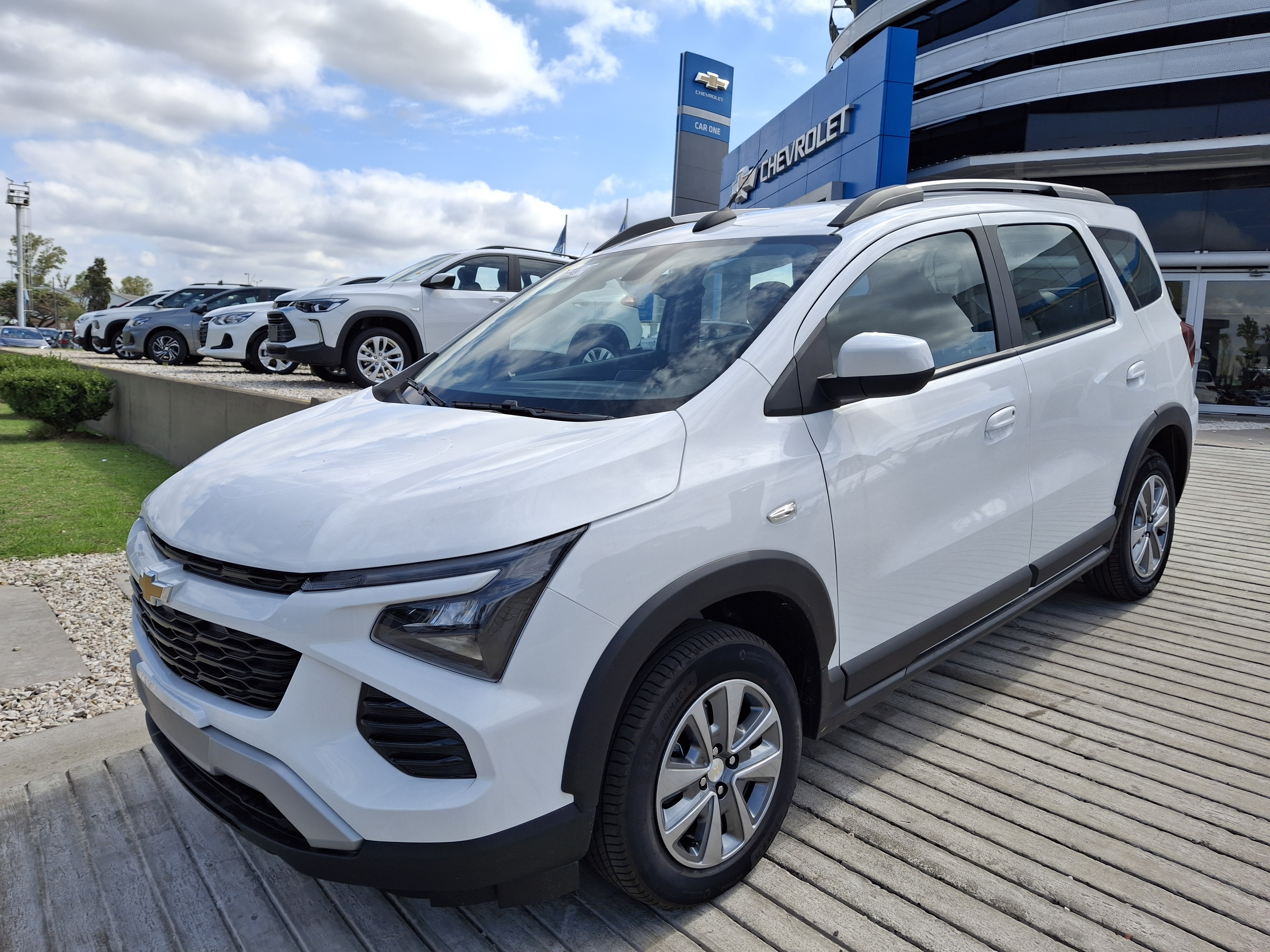
Second facelift Spin

A second facelift debuted on January 19th, 2024 on Chevrolet's Brazilian website. Its non-virtual debut will take place on the reality show Big Brother Brasil along with 5 other cars planned to be shown on the show. The 2025 Spin receives interior updates with it now incorporating the latest MyLink system in the infotainment system. It will also receive a new steering wheel, seats, and safety improvements. On the outside it receives a new front fascia, headlights, fenders, and a taller hood.

== Sales ==
Year	Brazil	Indonesia	Thailand
2012	18,930		
2013	41,983	10,941	
2014	36,796	7,475	1,131
2015	27,260	3,552	728
2016	22,982	1	
2017	24,713		
2018	28,361		
2019	25,192		
2020	15,662		
2021	13,012		
2022	17,817		
2023	20,316		
2024	24,950		
2025	22,741		
