= Opel Meriva =

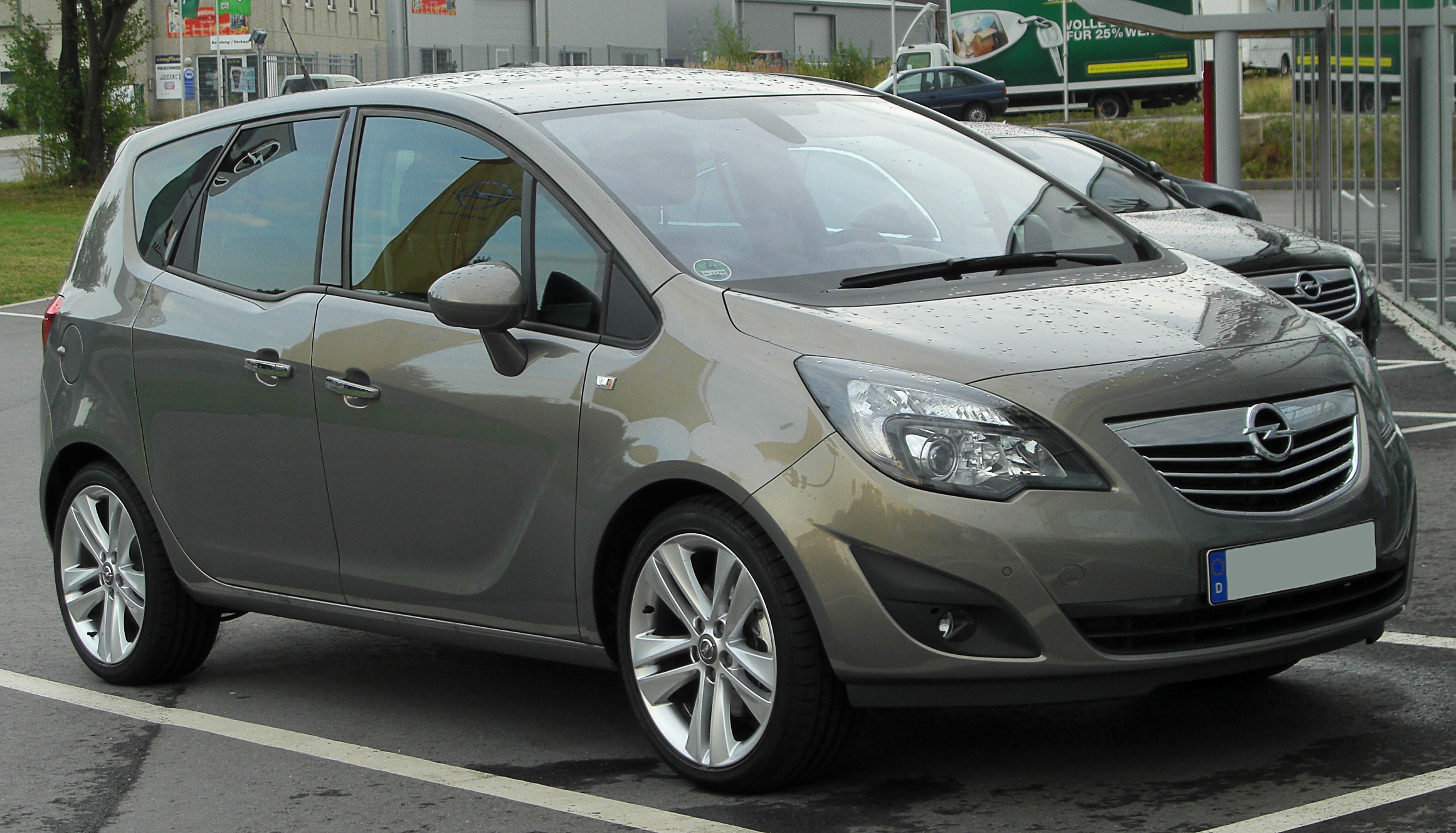

Overview
- Manufacturer: Opel
- Also called: Vauxhall Meriva; Chevrolet Meriva
- Production: May 2003 – June 2017

Body and chassis
- Class: Mini MPV
- Body style: 5-door MPV
- Layout: Front-engine, front-wheel-drive
- Doors: Conventional doors (1st gen); Conventional doors (front) / coach doors (rear) (2nd gen)

Chronology
- Successor: Opel Crossland

The Opel Meriva is a car manufactured and marketed by the German automaker Opel on its Corsa platform, from May 2003 until June 2017 across two generations. Described as a mini MPV, it was marketed as the Vauxhall Meriva in the United Kingdom, while in Latin America, the first generation model was marketed as the Chevrolet Meriva.

== First generation (2003) ==
Meriva A
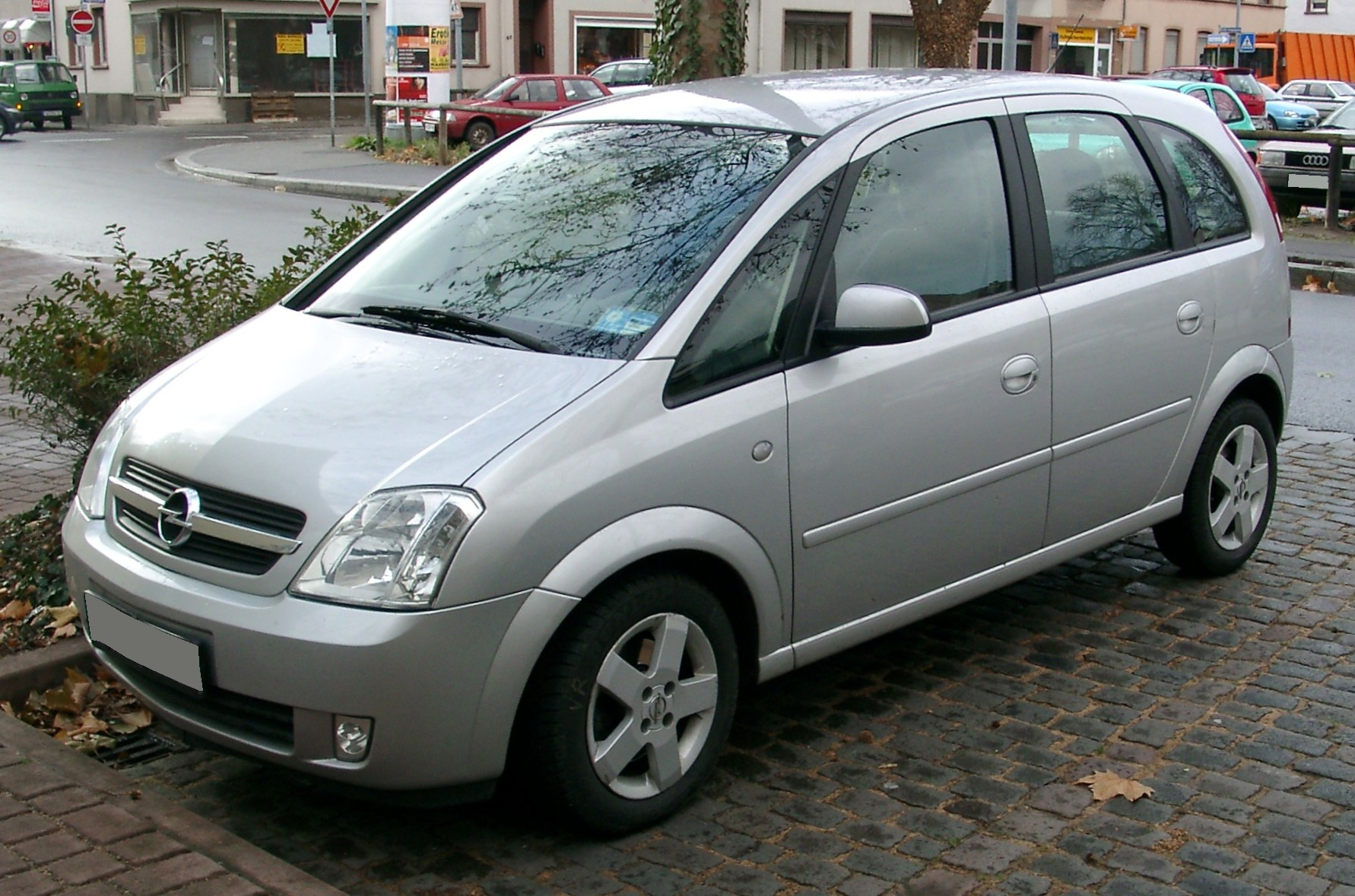

Overview
- Also called: Chevrolet Meriva (Latin America); Vauxhall Meriva (United Kingdom)
- Production: May 2003 – 2010 (Spain); 2003 – 2012 (South America) (until 2013 in Argentina)
- Assembly: Spain: Zaragoza; Brazil: São José dos Campos (GM Brazil); Ukraine: Zaporizhzhia (AvtoZAZ)

Body and chassis
- Platform: Gamma platform
- Related: Opel Corsa C Opel Combo C Opel Tigra TwinTop

Powertrain
- Engine: Petrol: 1.0 L Z10XEP I3 12V; 1.4 L Z14XEP I4 16V; 1.6 L Z16XE I4 16V; 1.6 L Z16SE I4 8V; 1.6 L A16LER (LDW) turbo I4 (OPC); 1.8 L Z18XE I4 16V; Diesel: 1.3 L MultiJet CDTI turbo I4 16V; 1.7 L Circle L DTI turbo I4 16V; 1.7 L Circle L CDTI turbo I4 16V
- Transmission: 5-speed manual; 6-speed manual; 5-speed automatic

Dimensions
- Wheelbase: 2,630 mm (103.5 in)
- Length: 4,050 mm (159.4 in)
- Width: 1,695 mm (66.7 in)
- Height: 1,625 mm (64.0 in)

Chronology
- Successor: Chevrolet Spin (South America)

The first generation, named "Meriva A", was based on the third generation Opel Corsa C. It went on sale in May 2003. The first official pictures of the Meriva were released in August 2002. It has been described as a mini MPV, a supermini-MPV, a small people carrier, and an estate car.

Like its larger counterpart, the Zafira, the Meriva has a flexible interior, marketed as "FlexSpace". Although it only has five seats divided into two rows, the second row can slide forward or backward, or be flattened into the floor, making a flat, level platform for increased boot space. The second row can accommodate two or three passengers.

In the two passenger mode, the seats are separated from the doors and from each other much like the front seats. In three passenger mode, the back seat looks like a regular one-piece seat. The front seat can be pushed fully backwards.

The Meriva was sold in South America (except in Chile) from 2003 through 2012 (2013 in Argentina) as the "Chevrolet Meriva", and was replaced in 2012 by the Chevrolet Spin. The initial version had been co-developed by Opel and General Motors do Brasil. It was built in São José dos Campos, Brazil.

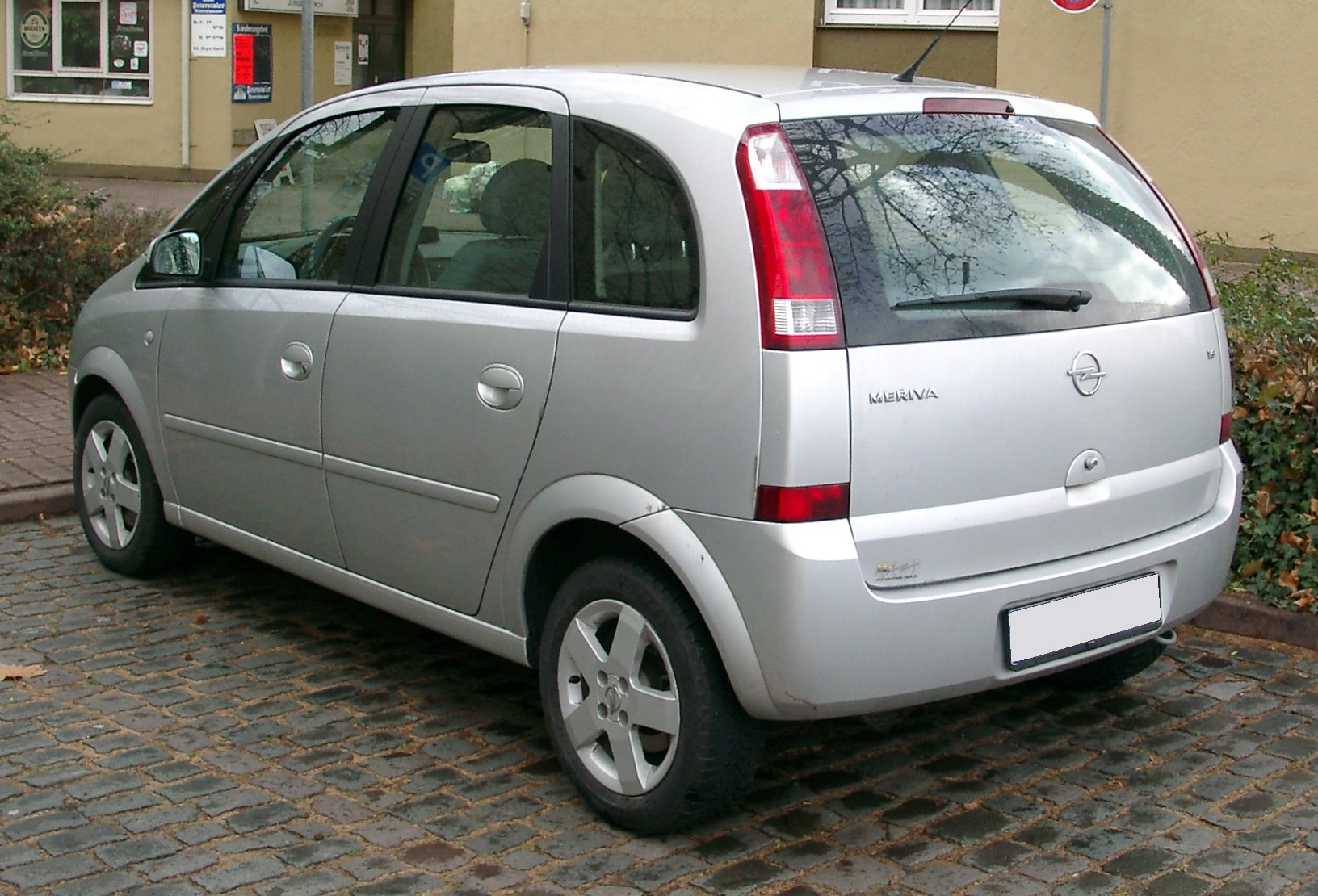
Rear view

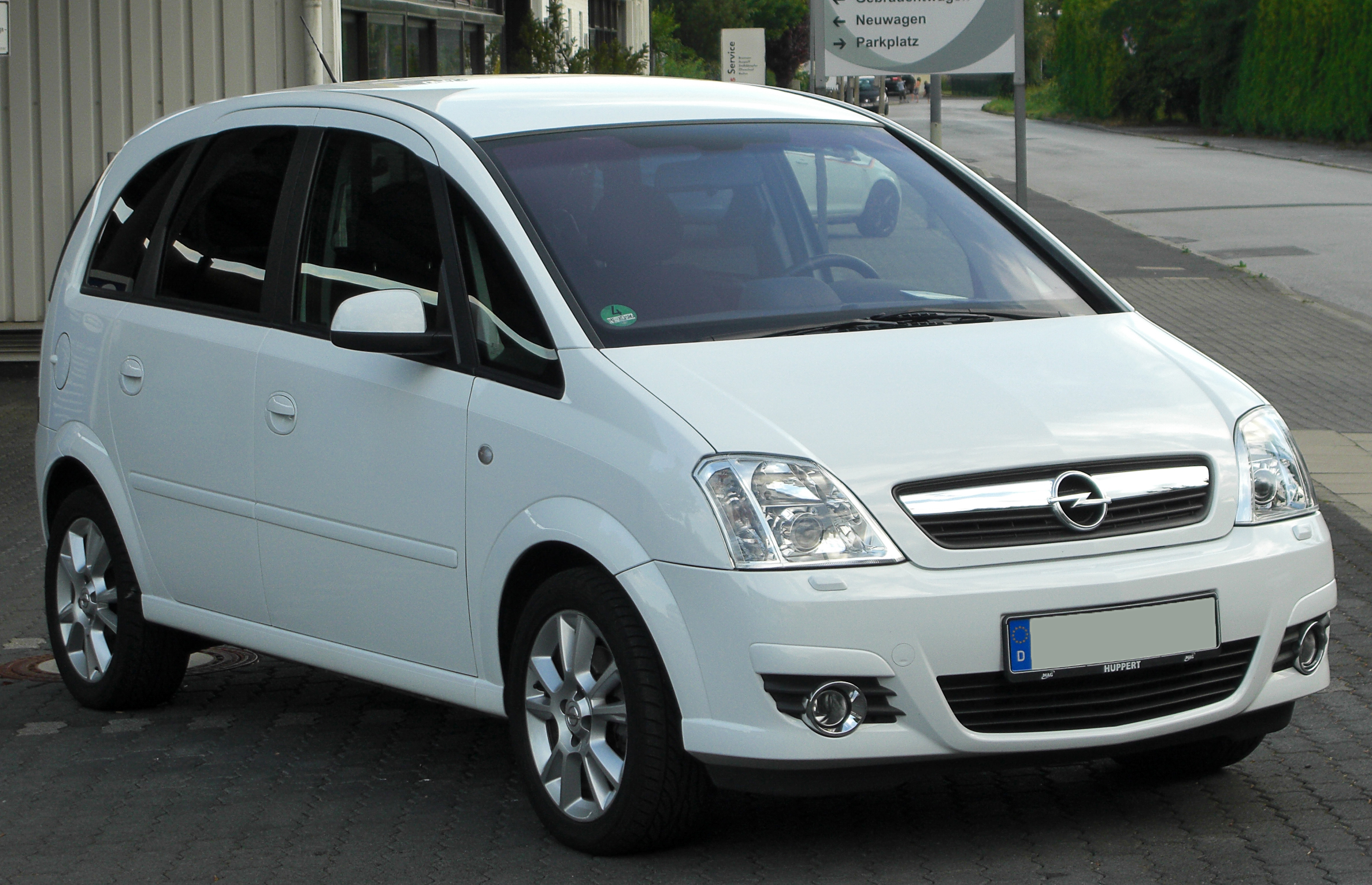
Opel Meriva (2006–2010)

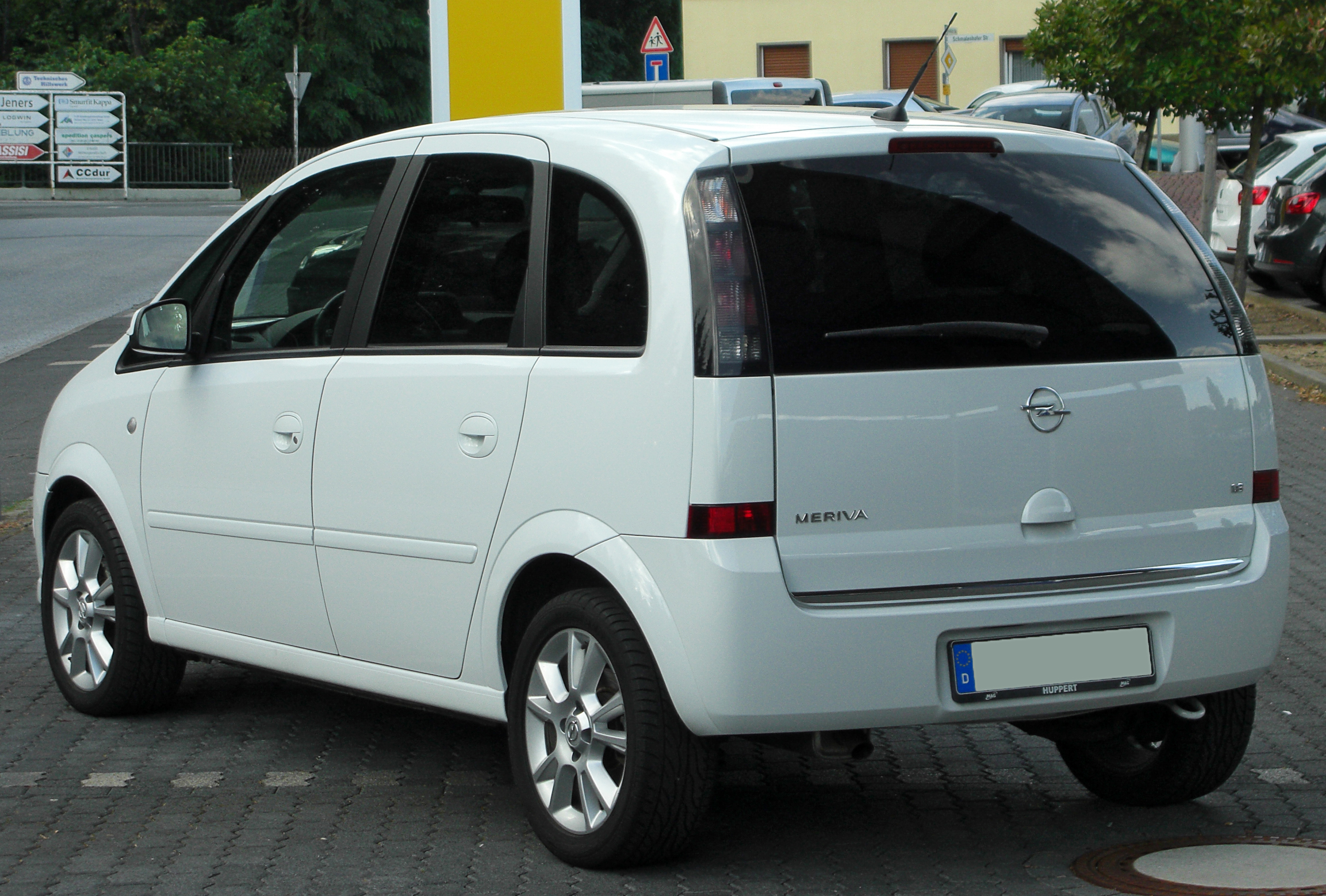
Rear view

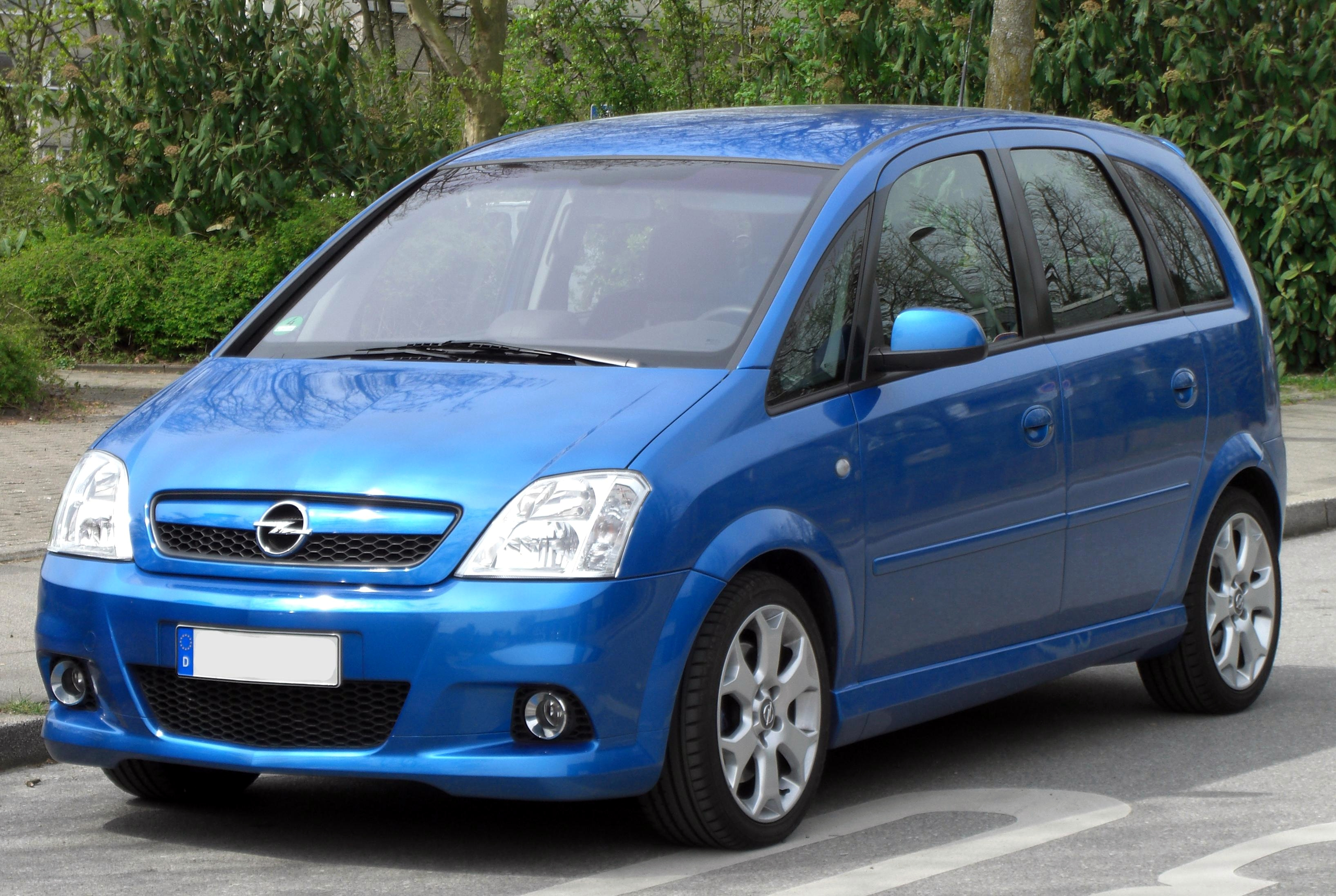
Opel Meriva OPC (2006–2010)

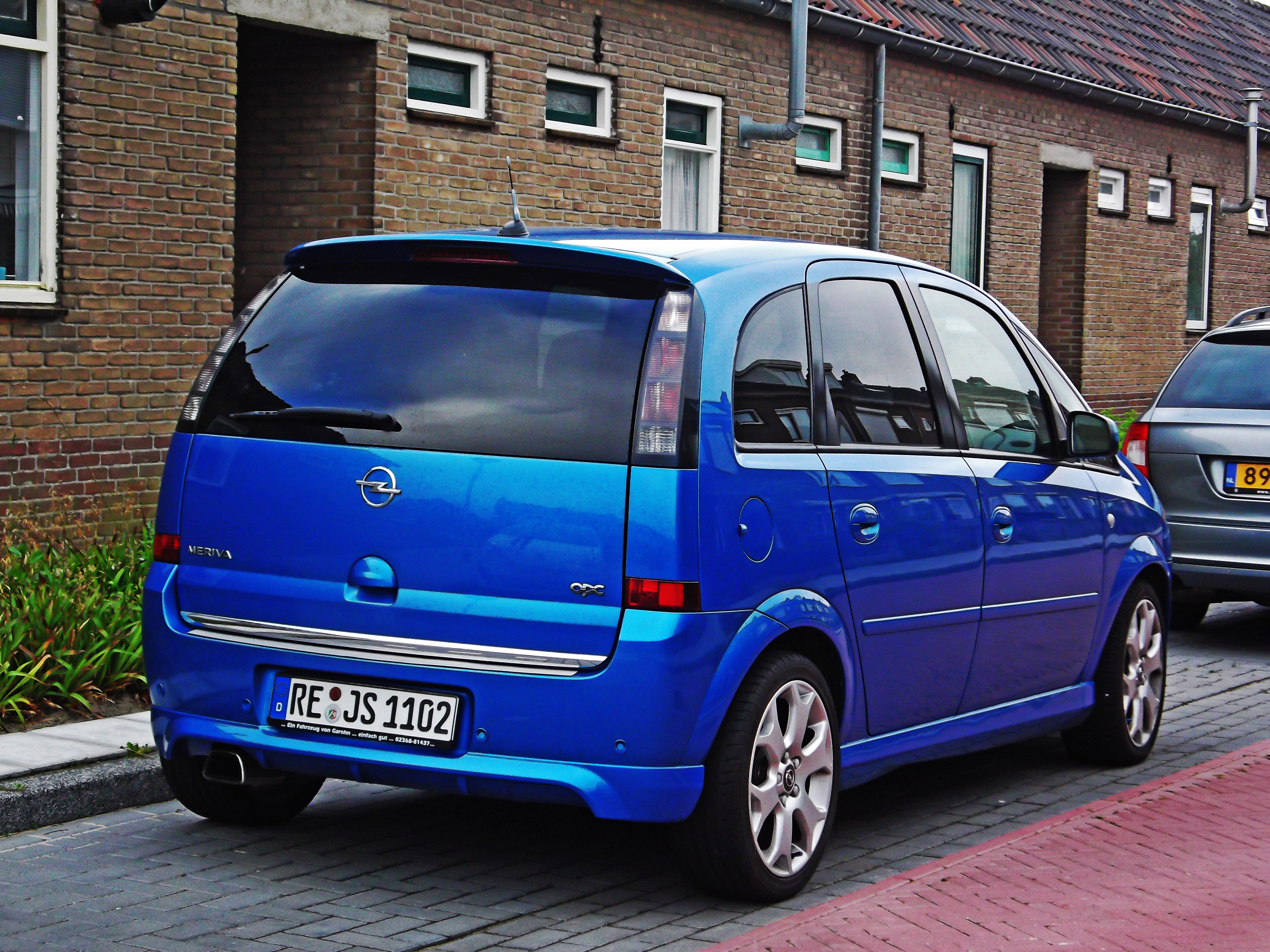
Opel Meriva OPC (2006–2010)

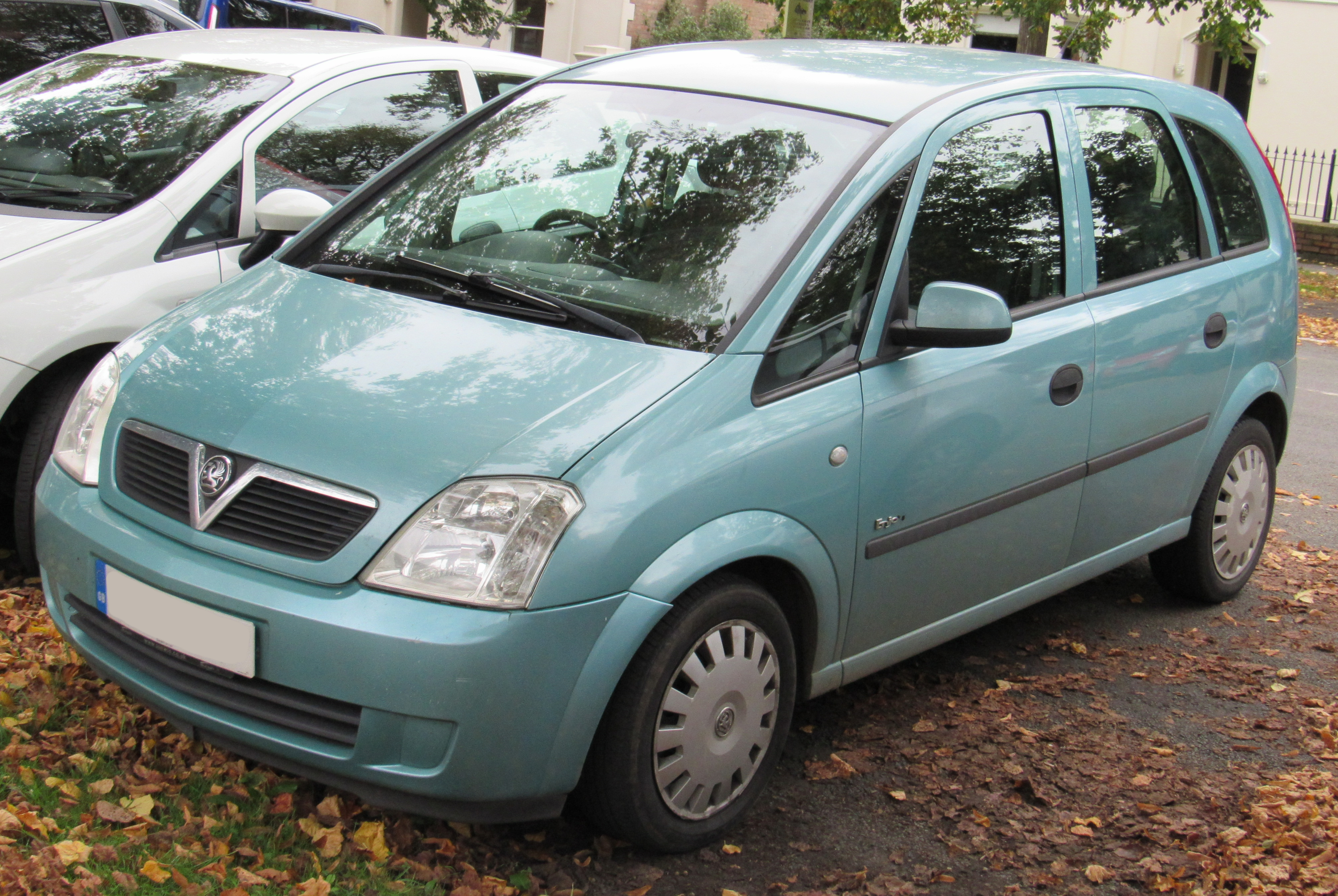
Vauxhall Meriva

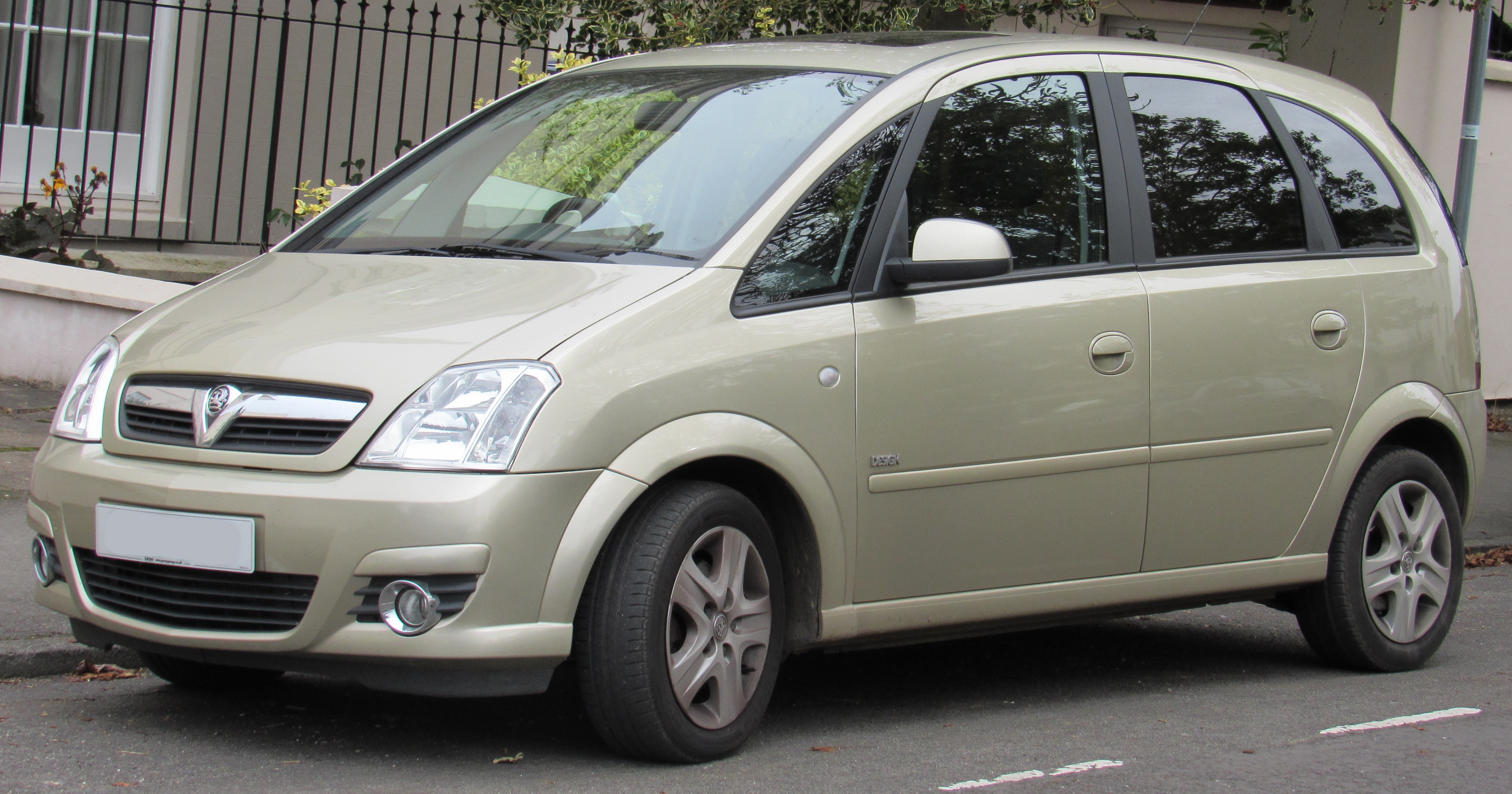
Vauxhall Meriva (facelift)

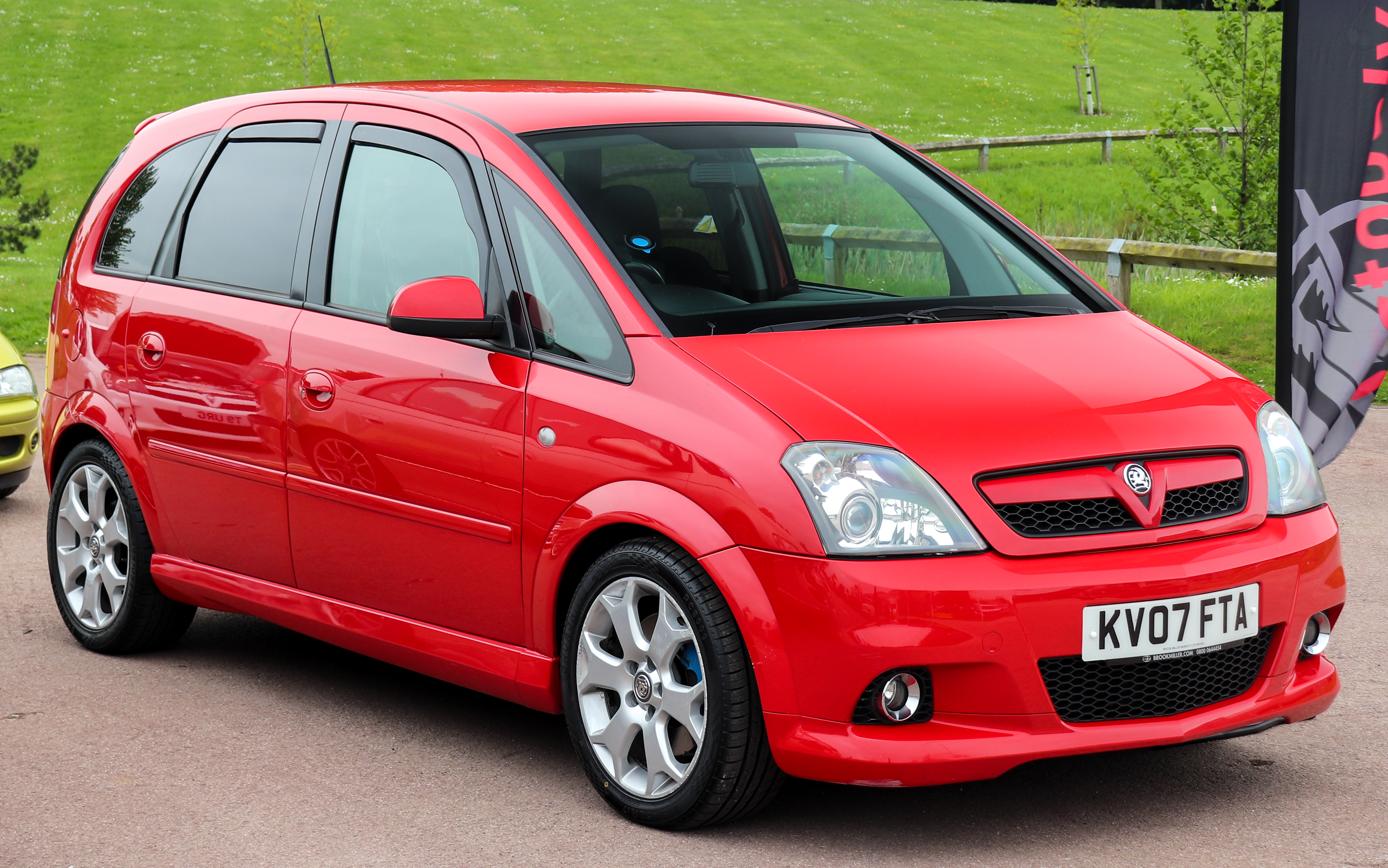
Vauxhall Meriva VXR

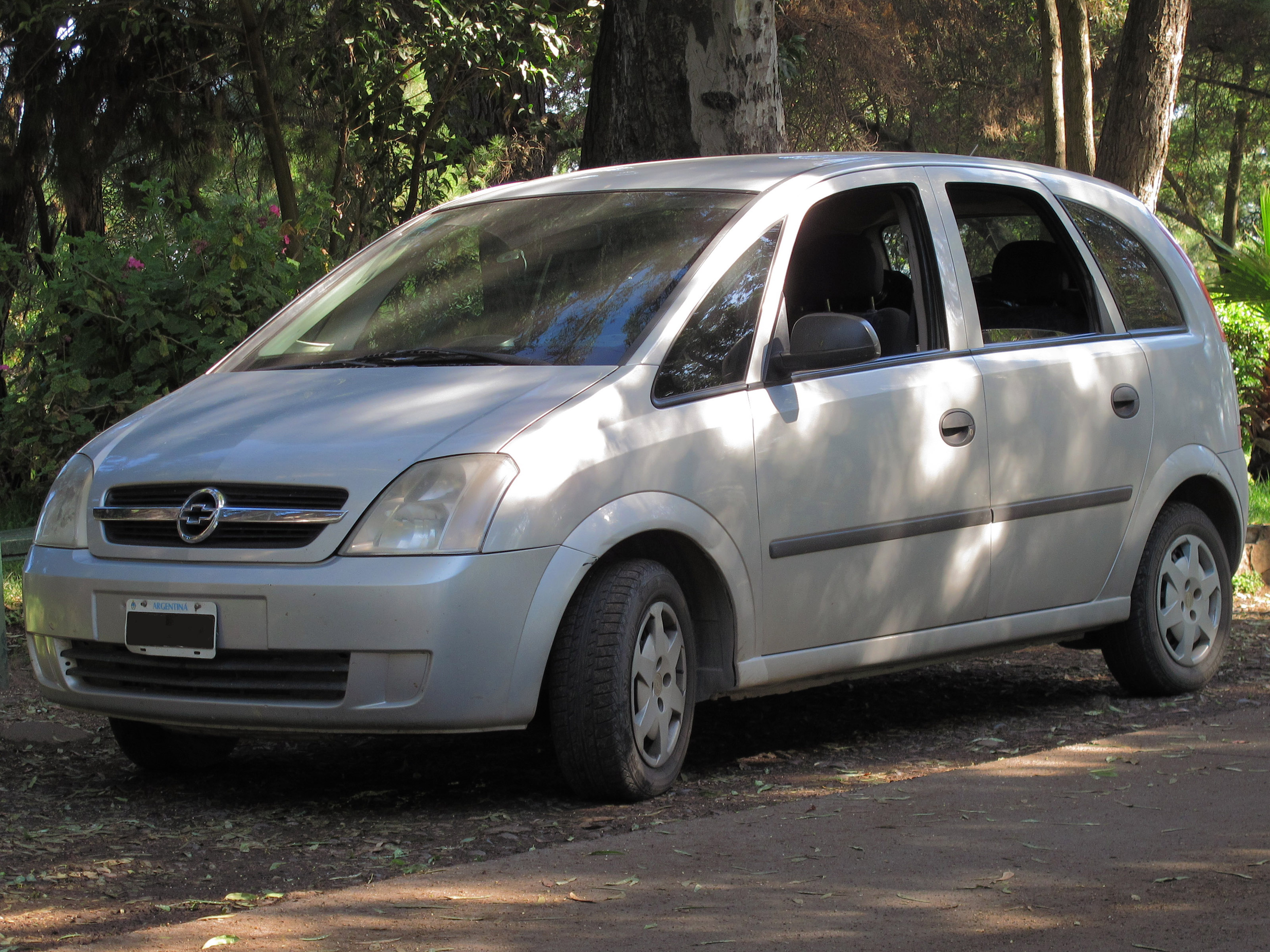
Chevrolet Meriva (2005)

=== Engines ===
==== Initial launch ====
From launch, there were three petrol engines and one diesel engine. In 2005, the 1.6 8 v petrol engine was replaced with the more powerful and efficient 1.4 engine. The 1.6 turbo was available with a six speed manual gearbox as standard, and the other engines had five speed manual gearboxes as standard. The 1.6 (16v) and 1.8 petrols were available with five speed 'Easytronic' gearboxes as options.

Petrol

- 1.0
- 1.4 Twinport, with 90 PS (66 kW; 89 hp) (since 2005)
- 1.6 (8 v), with 85 PS (63 kW; 84 hp)
- 1.6 (16 v), with 110 PS (81 kW; 108 hp)
- 1.8, with 125 PS (92 kW; 123 hp)

Both 1.4 and 1.8 were available as flexfuel in Brazil.

Diesel

- 1.7 CDTI, with 100 PS (74 kW; 99 hp)

Petrol

- 1.4 Twinport, with 90 PS (66 kW; 89 hp)
- 1.6 Twinport 105 PS (77 kW; 104 hp)
- 1.8, with 125 PS (92 kW; 123 hp)
- 1.6 turbo, with 180 PS (132 kW; 178 hp) (OPC/VXR model only)

Diesel

- 1.3 CDTI, with 75 PS (55 kW; 74 hp)
- 1.7 DTI, with 75 PS (55 kW; 74 hp)
- 1.7 CDTI, with 100 PS (74 kW; 99 hp)
- 1.7 CDTI, with 125 PS (92 kW; 123 hp)

=== Facelift ===
When the Meriva was facelifted in February 2006, the front and rear ends were revised, and three new or revised engines came along as well as an extra trim level, the OPC/VXR.

=== Safety ===
The Meriva in its standard European market configuration received four stars for adult occupants and one star for pedestrians from Euro NCAP in 2003.

The Meriva in its most basic Latin American market configuration with one airbag received three stars for adult occupants and one star for toddlers from Latin NCAP in 2010.

Latin NCAP 1.0 test results Chevrolet Meriva GL Plus + 1 Airbag (2010, based on Euro NCAP 1997)
Test	Points	Stars
Adult occupant:	8.64/17.0	3 /5 stars
Child occupant:	9.04/49.00	1 /5 stars

== Second generation (2010) ==
Meriva B
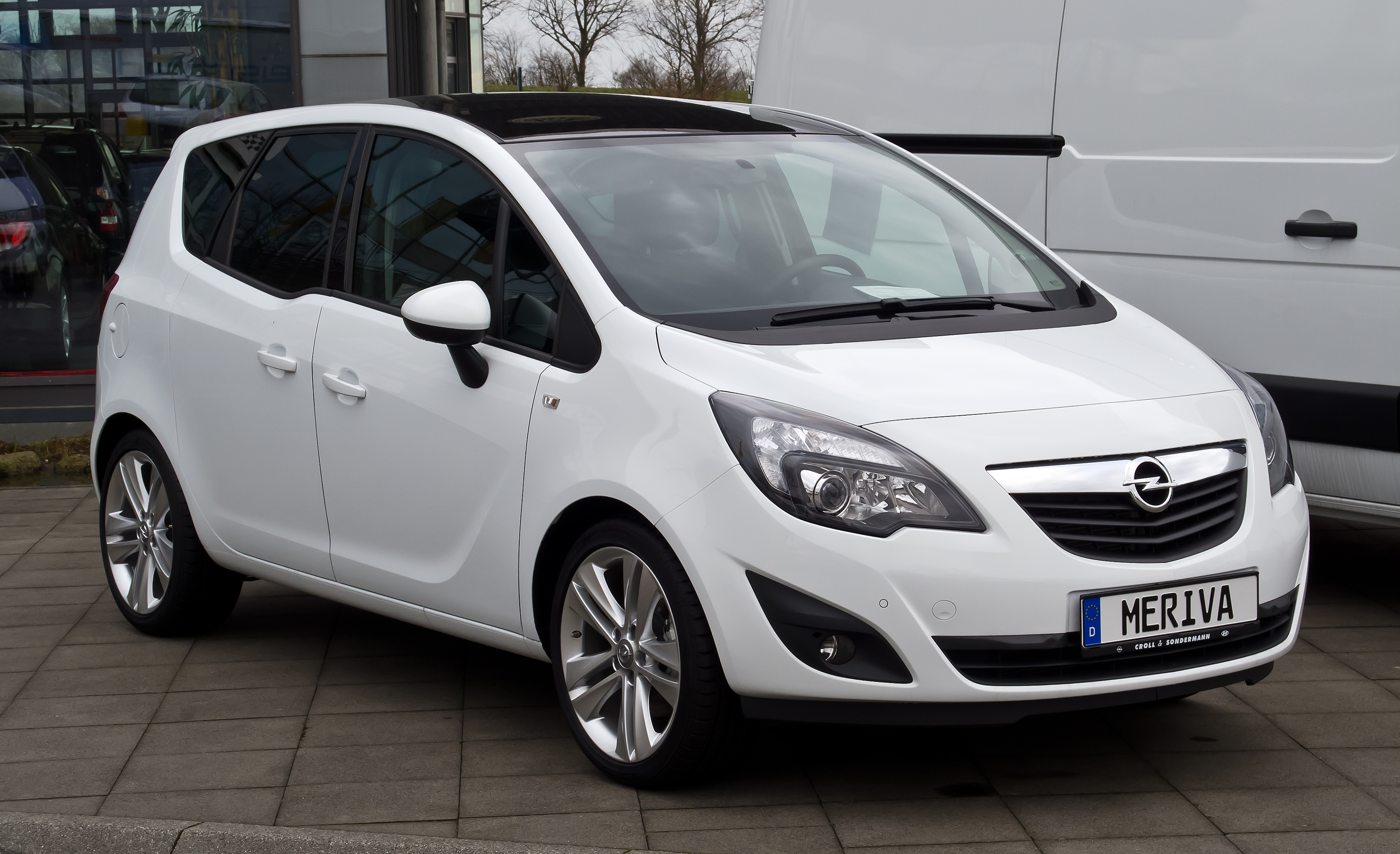

Overview
- Also called: Vauxhall Meriva (United Kingdom); Opel Meriva Activan (Denmark); Opel Meriva Crossvan (Israel)
- Production: June 12, 2010 – June 2017
- Assembly: Spain: Zaragoza
- Designer: Mark Adams

Body and chassis
- Platform: SCCS platform
- Doors: Conventional doors (front) coach doors (rear)

Powertrain
- Engine: Petrol: 1.4 L Family 0 I4; 1.4 L Family 0 turbo I4; Diesel: 1.3 L Family B I4; 1.7 L Circle L I4
- Transmission: 5-speed manual 6-speed manual 6-speed automatic

Dimensions
- Wheelbase: 2,644 mm (104.1 in)
- Length: 4,288 mm (168.8 in)
- Width: 1,812 mm (71.3 in)
- Height: 1,615 mm (63.6 in)

Chronology
- Successor: Opel Crossland X

The second generation, named "Meriva B", is slightly larger in size than the previous generation. It has been described as a compact MPV, a supermini-MPV, a small people carrier, a small family car, and an estate car.

The market launch took place on 12 June 2010. The Meriva B appeared in November 2009. The new model is 4,288 mm (168.8 in) in length, up from the 4,052 mm (159.5 in) of the previous version, which was based on the Corsa. The new model uses revised suspension layout from the former version but with a floorpan associated with the seven seater Zafira Tourer. The interior is similar to that of the 2009 to 2015 Astra and Insignia.

The new Meriva uses front seat technology from the Insignia and Astra. The seat adjustment range is 240 mm (9.4 in) in length and 65 mm (2.6 in) in height.

The Meriva B debuted at the 2010 Geneva Motor Show in March, and went into production in July 2010. The Meriva has rear-hinged rear doors, marketed as "FlexDoors". A panoramic sunroof is also available as standard on the top spec versions.

The Meriva B ended production in June 2017, and was replaced by an urban crossover named the Crossland X, and also a transition from MPV to SUV design, sister of the future replacement of the Citroën C3 Picasso.

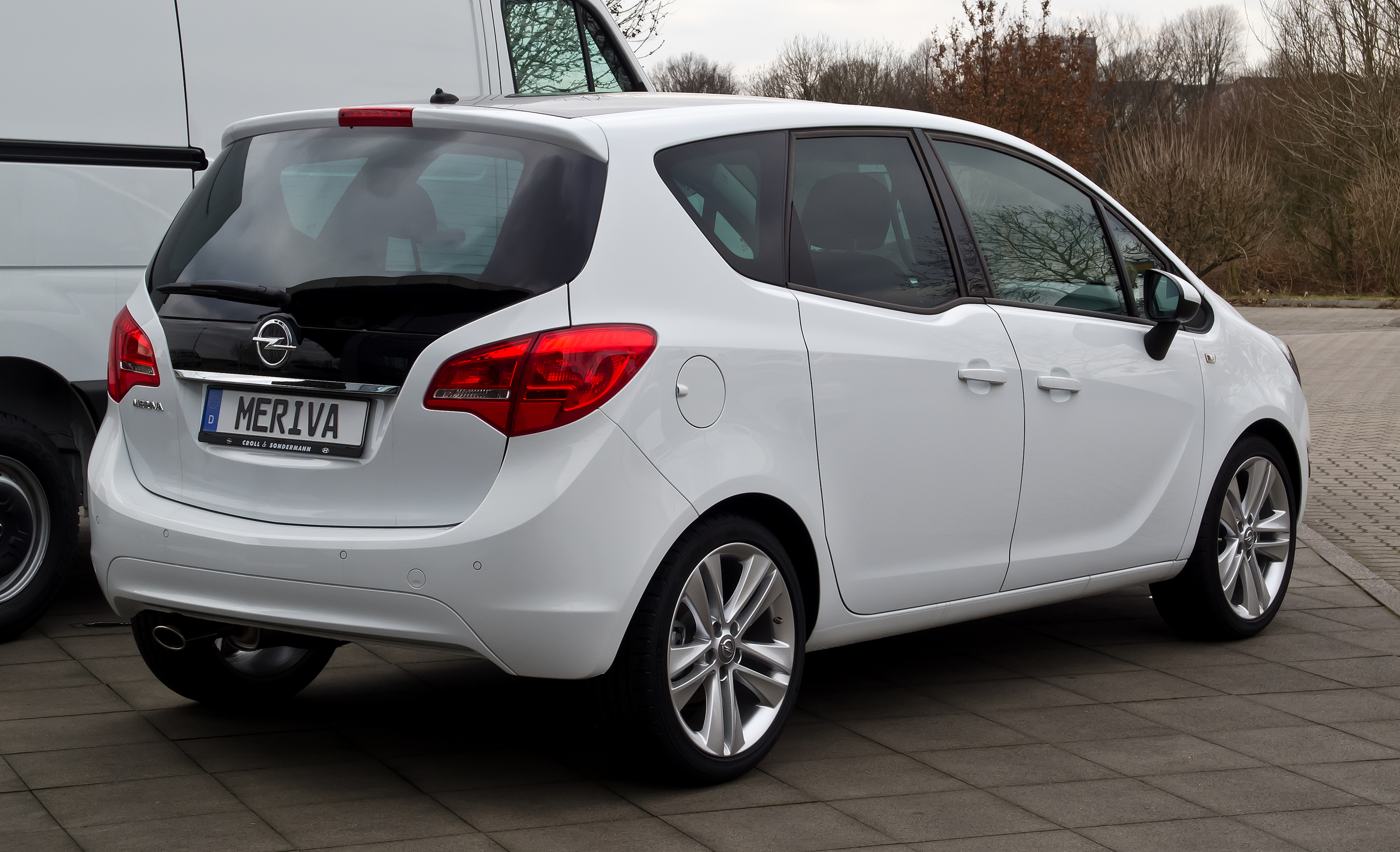
Meriva B (rear view)

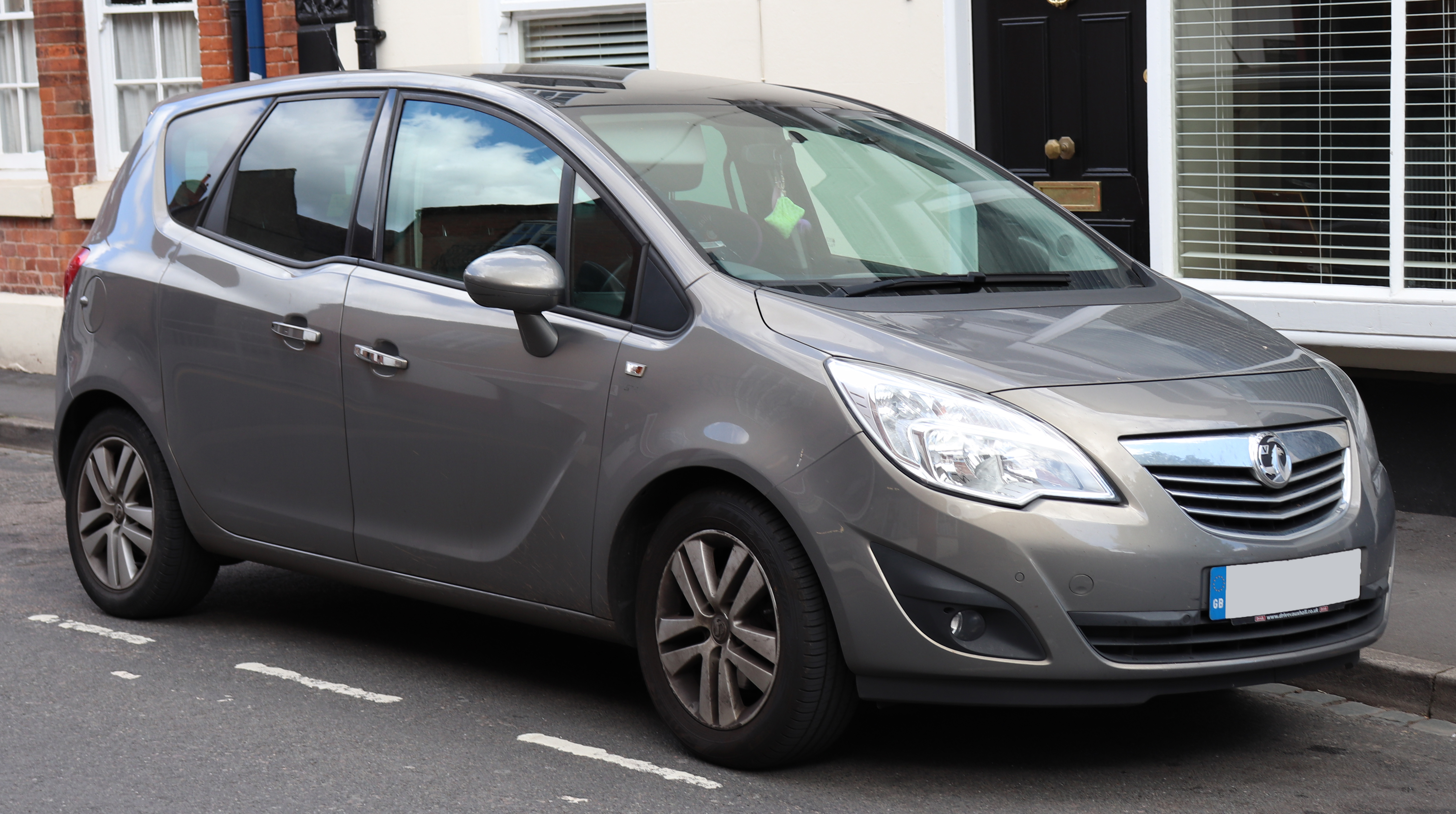
Vauxhall Meriva B

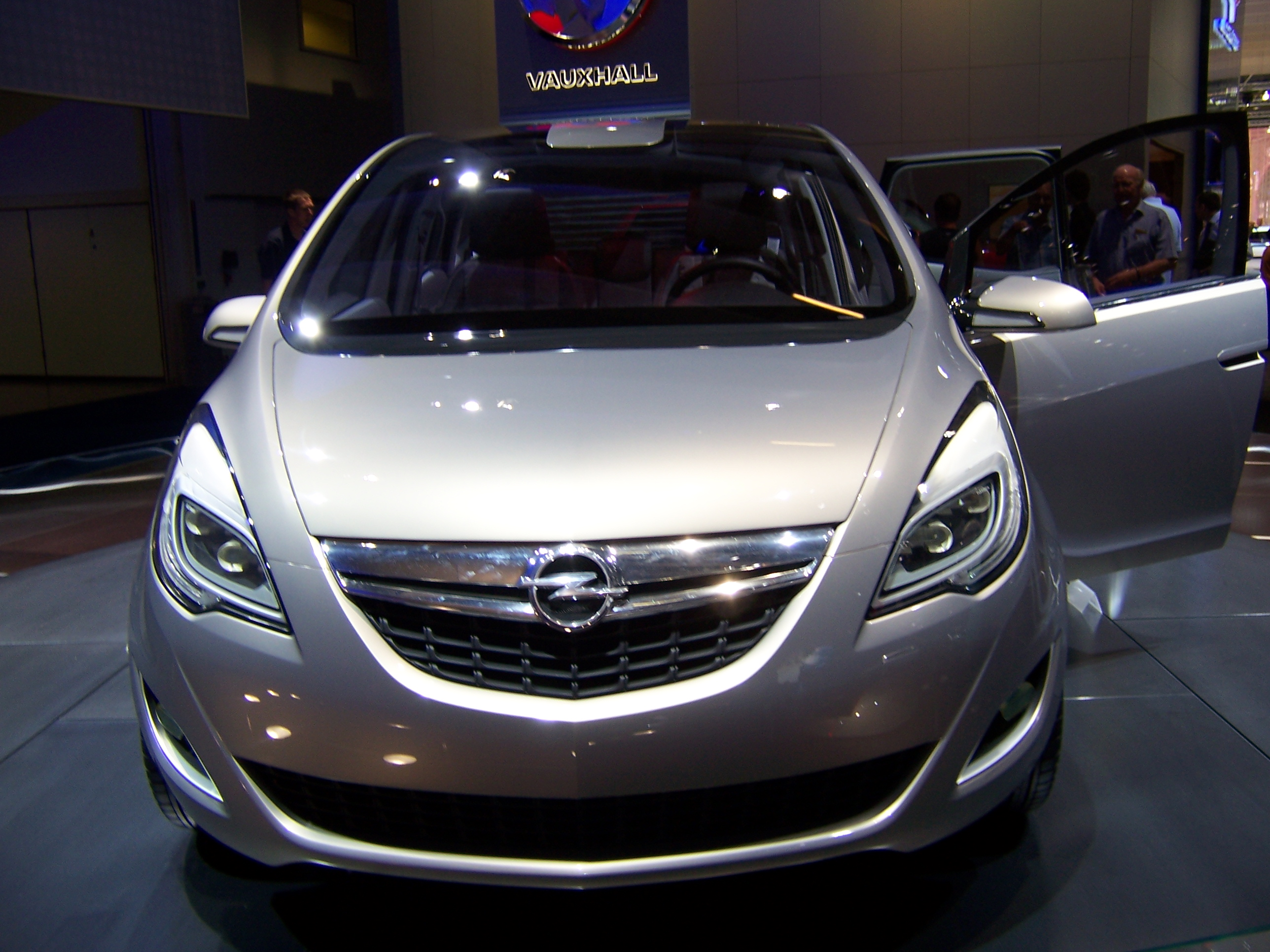
Opel Meriva B Concept

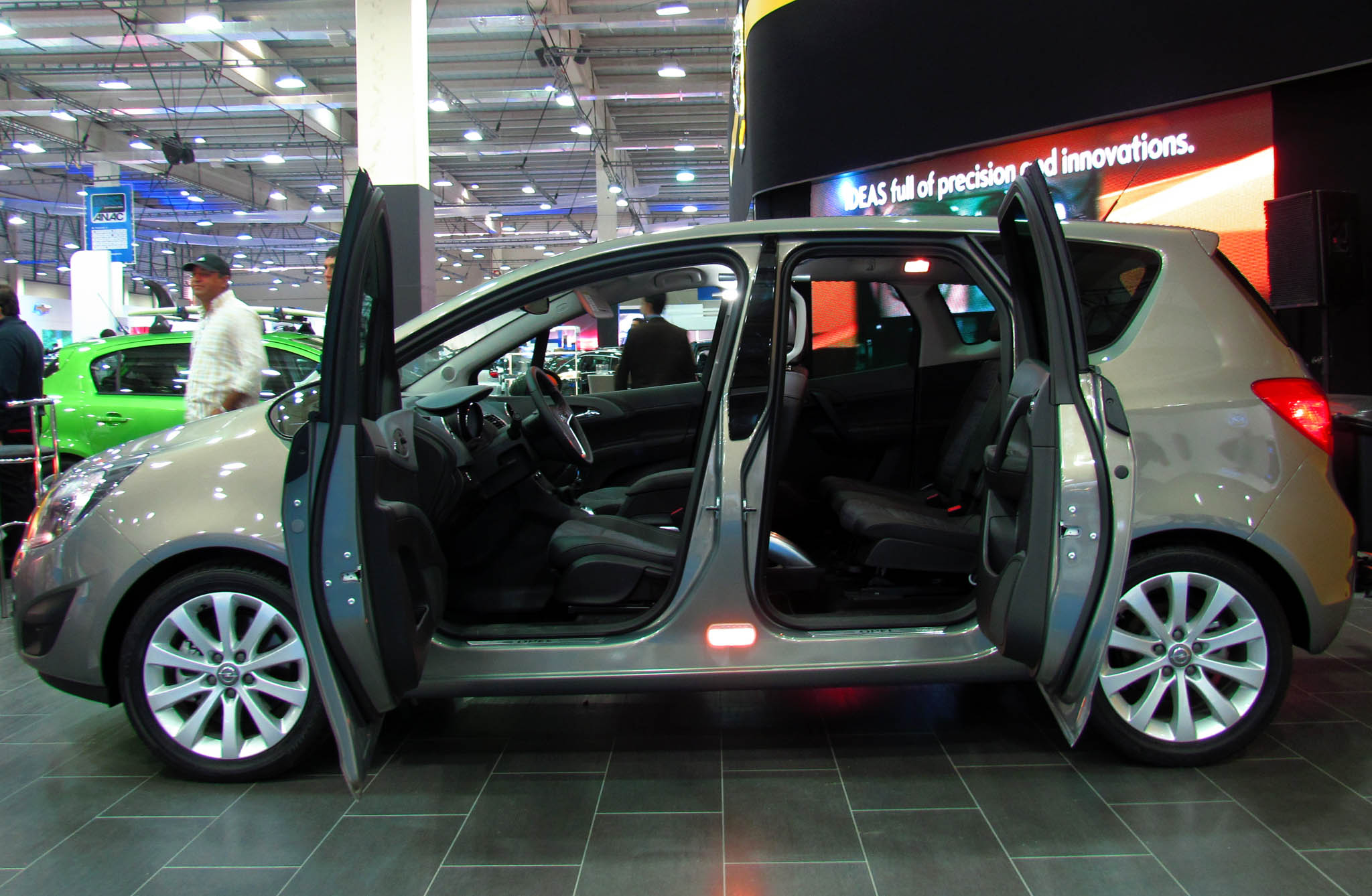
Meriva's FlexDoors, Salón del automóvil de Santiago 2012, Chile

=== Engines ===
From launch, the Meriva was available with five engines (three petrol, two diesel). The 1.7 diesel was only available with a six speed automatic gearbox, and the 1.4 turbo (140 PS) and 1.7 (130 hp) were only available with a six speed manual gearbox. Since September 2010, two more engines became available, both diesel, the 1.3 (95 hp) and the 1.7 (130 hp). All petrol engines are Ecotec.

From 2011, Stop/Start was added to certain engines (engines with (S/S) are bold in CO_{2} column), a cleaner, more powerful 1.7 CDTI auto was added, and the petrol engines became slightly more efficient. A six speed automatic gearbox became available for the 1.4T (120) petrol engine.

In January 2014. Opel introduced newly developed engine with restyled Meriva: 1.6 CDTI engine with 95 PS, 110 PS, and 136 PS.

Petrol engine
Model	Engine	Displacement	Power	Torque	Note	CO_{2} emission (g/km)	Years
1.4 VVT	I4	1,398 cc	100 PS (74 kW; 99 hp) at 6,000 rpm	130 N⋅m (96 lb⋅ft) at 4,000 rpm		144 (2010–2011) 143 (2011–2017)	
1.4T VVT	I4	1,364 cc	120 PS (88 kW; 118 hp) at 4,800-6,000 rpm	175 N⋅m (129 lb⋅ft) at 1,750-4,800 rpm		143 (2010–2011) 139 (2011–2017)	
1.4T VVT	I4	1,364 cc	140 PS (103 kW; 138 hp) at 4,900-6,000 rpm	200 N⋅m (148 lb⋅ft)at 1,850-4,900 rpm		156 (2010–2011) 151 (2011–2017)	
Diesel engine
Model	Engine	Displacement	Power	Torque	Note	CO_{2} emission (g/km)	Years
1.3 CDTI	I4	1,248 cc	75 PS (55 kW; 74 hp) at 4,000 rpm	180 N⋅m (133 lb⋅ft) at 1,750-2,500 rpm		129	2010–2014
1.3 CDTI ecoFLEX	I4	1,248 cc	95 PS (70 kW; 94 hp) at 4,000 rpm	180 N⋅m (133 lb⋅ft)at 1,750-3,500 rpm		119 (2010–2017) 109 (2011–2017)	2010–2014
1.6 CDTI ecoFLEX S/S	I4	1,598 cc	95 PS (70 kW; 94 hp) at 3,500 rpm	280 N⋅m (207 lb⋅ft)at 1,500-1,750 rpm		105	2014–2017
1.6 CDTI ecoFLEX S/S	I4	1,598 cc	110 PS (81 kW; 108 hp) at 3,500 rpm	300 N⋅m (221 lb⋅ft)at 1,750-2,000 rpm		105	2014–2017
1.6 CDTI ecoFLEX S/S	I4	1,598 cc	136 PS (100 kW; 134 hp) at 3,500-4,000 rpm	320 N⋅m (236 lb⋅ft)at 2,000-2,500 rpm		116	2013–2017
1.7 CDTI	I4	1,686 cc	100 PS (74 kW; 99 hp) at 4,000 rpm	260 N⋅m (192 lb⋅ft)at 1,700-2,550 rpm	auto only	168	2010–'11
1.7 CDTI	I4	1,686 cc	110 PS (81 kW; 108 hp) at 4,000 rpm	260 N⋅m (192 lb⋅ft)at 1,700-2,550 rpm	auto only	160	2011–2014
1.7 CDTI	I4	1,686 cc	130 PS (96 kW; 128 hp) at 4,000 rpm	300 N⋅m (221 lb⋅ft)at 2,000-2,500 rpm		138	2010–2014

=== Safety ===
The Meriva in its standard European market configuration received 5 stars from Euro NCAP in 2010.

=== Facelift ===
A facelifted version was presented as a world premiere at the Brussels International Motor Show in January 2014. It was also presented at the Frankfurt Motor Show in September 2013.

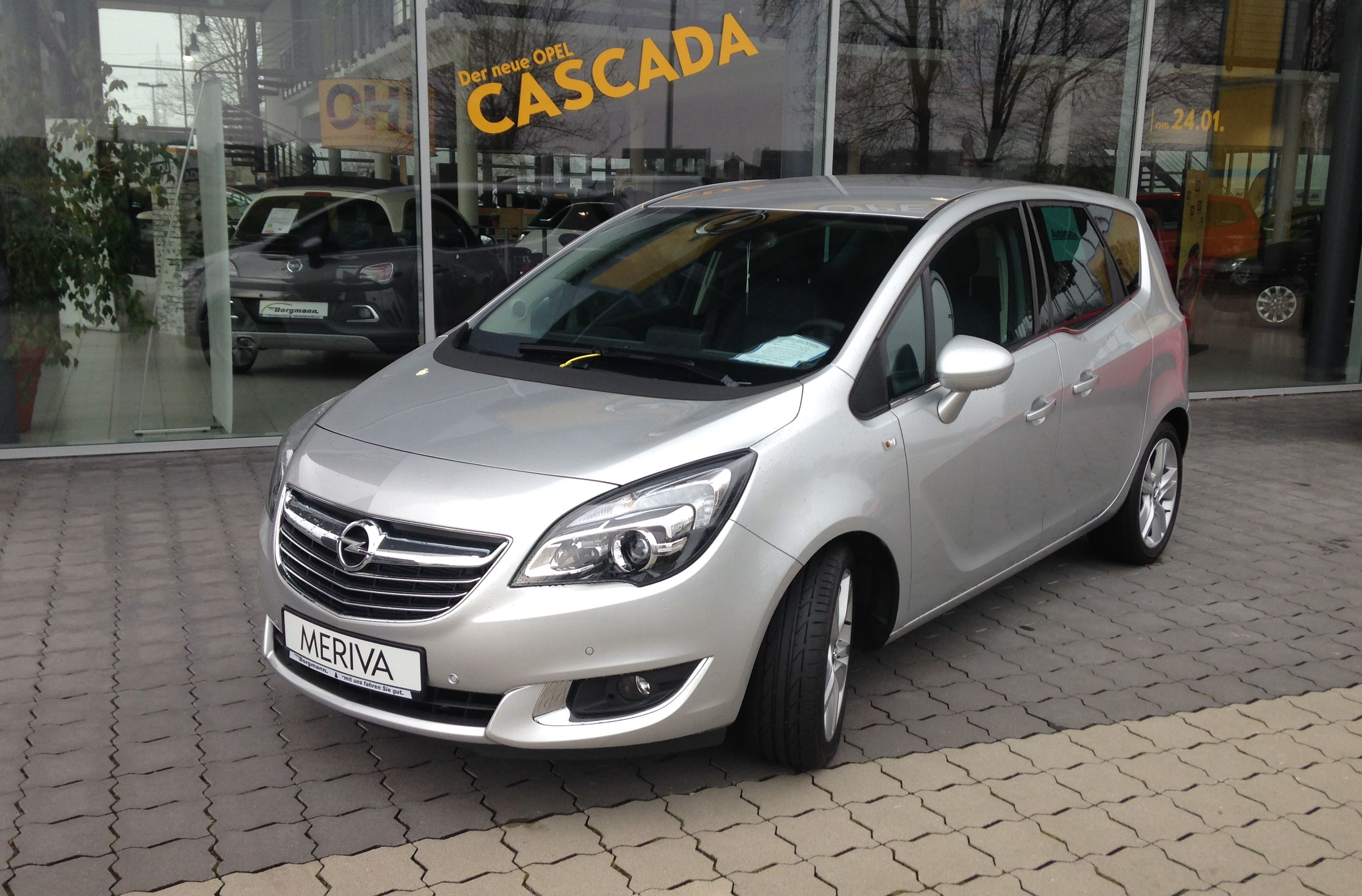
Opel Meriva (facelift)

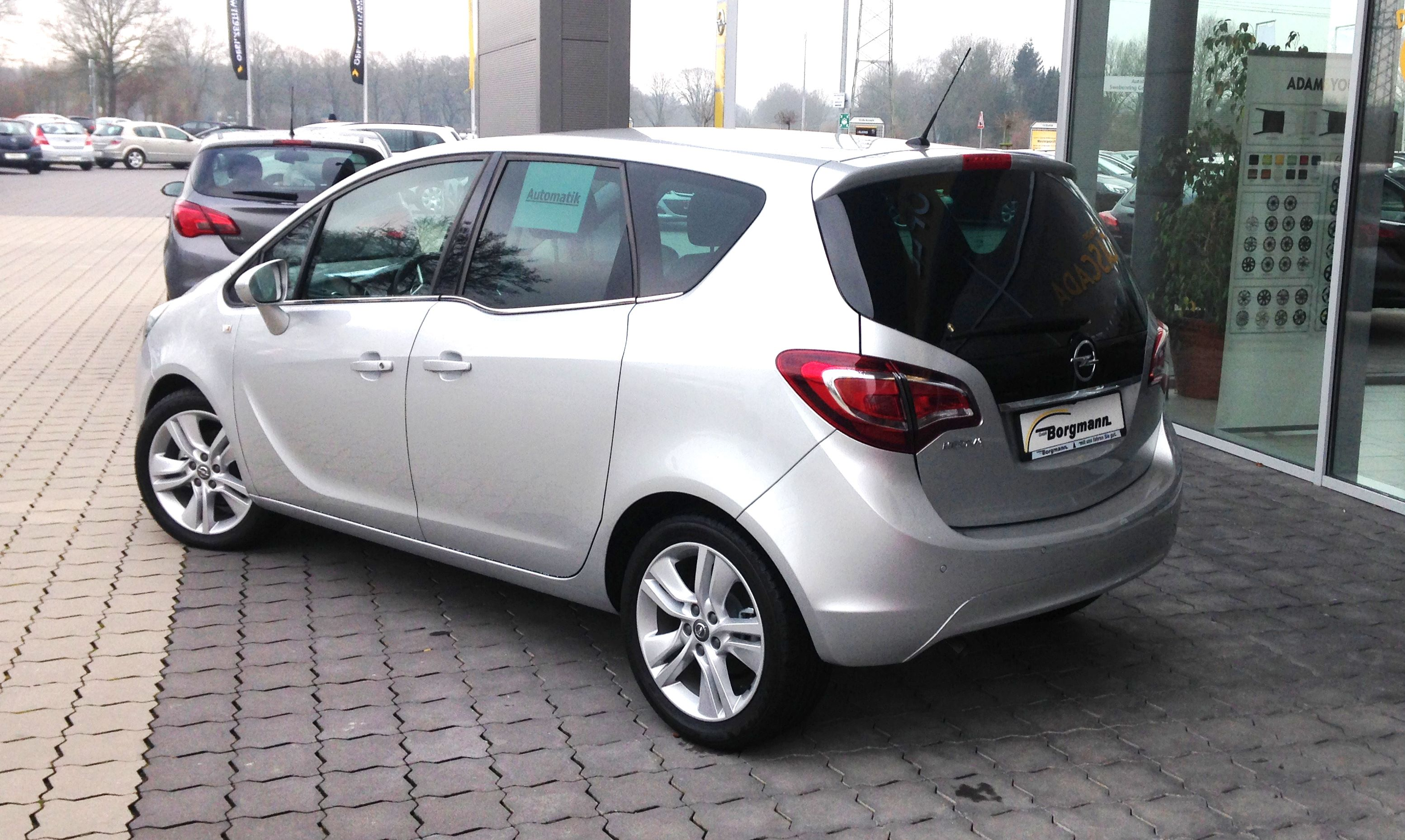
Rear view

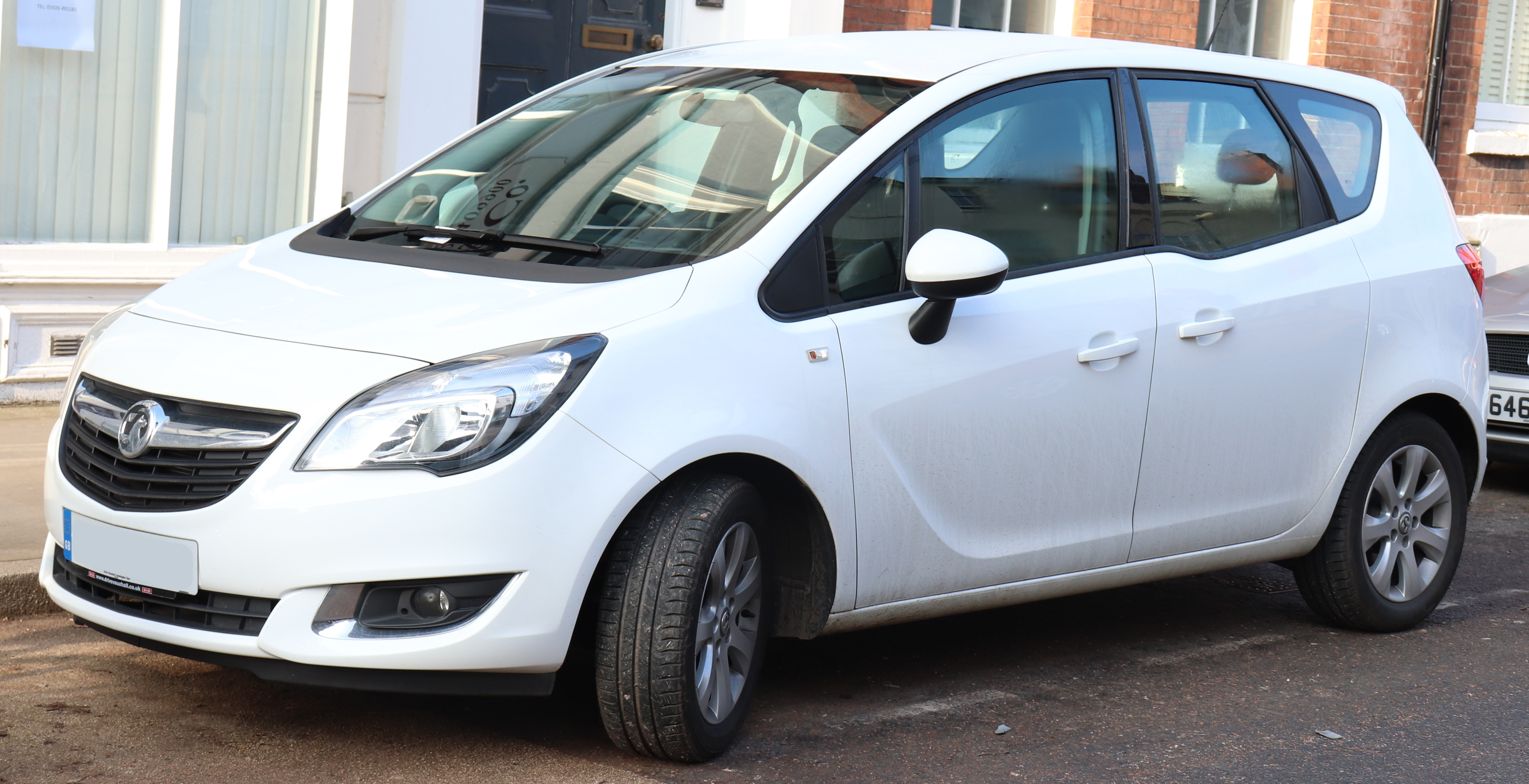
Vauxhall Meriva (facelift)

== Sales ==
=== Chevrolet Meriva ===
Year	Brazil
2003	21,261
2004	20,686
2005	21,234
2006	21,373
2007	22,691
2008	24,363
2009	33,339
2010	24,484
2011	22,253
2012	11,530

== See also ==
- Opel Zafira
- Chevrolet Spin
