= Renault R212 =

Bus

The Renault R212 is a medium size bus (8.82m long), originally developed and sold by the French CBM (Car et Bus du Mans) as the CBM 220.

It was built for Renault Trucks by Heuliez with 60 units manufactured between 1987 and 1989. It was available in two versions; 55 persons (25 seated, 30 standing) and 57 persons (21 seated, 36 standing).

The R212 was replaced in 1990 by a Heuliez badged GX 77H "COMPAC'BUS".
