= GM Family 1 engine =

Family 1
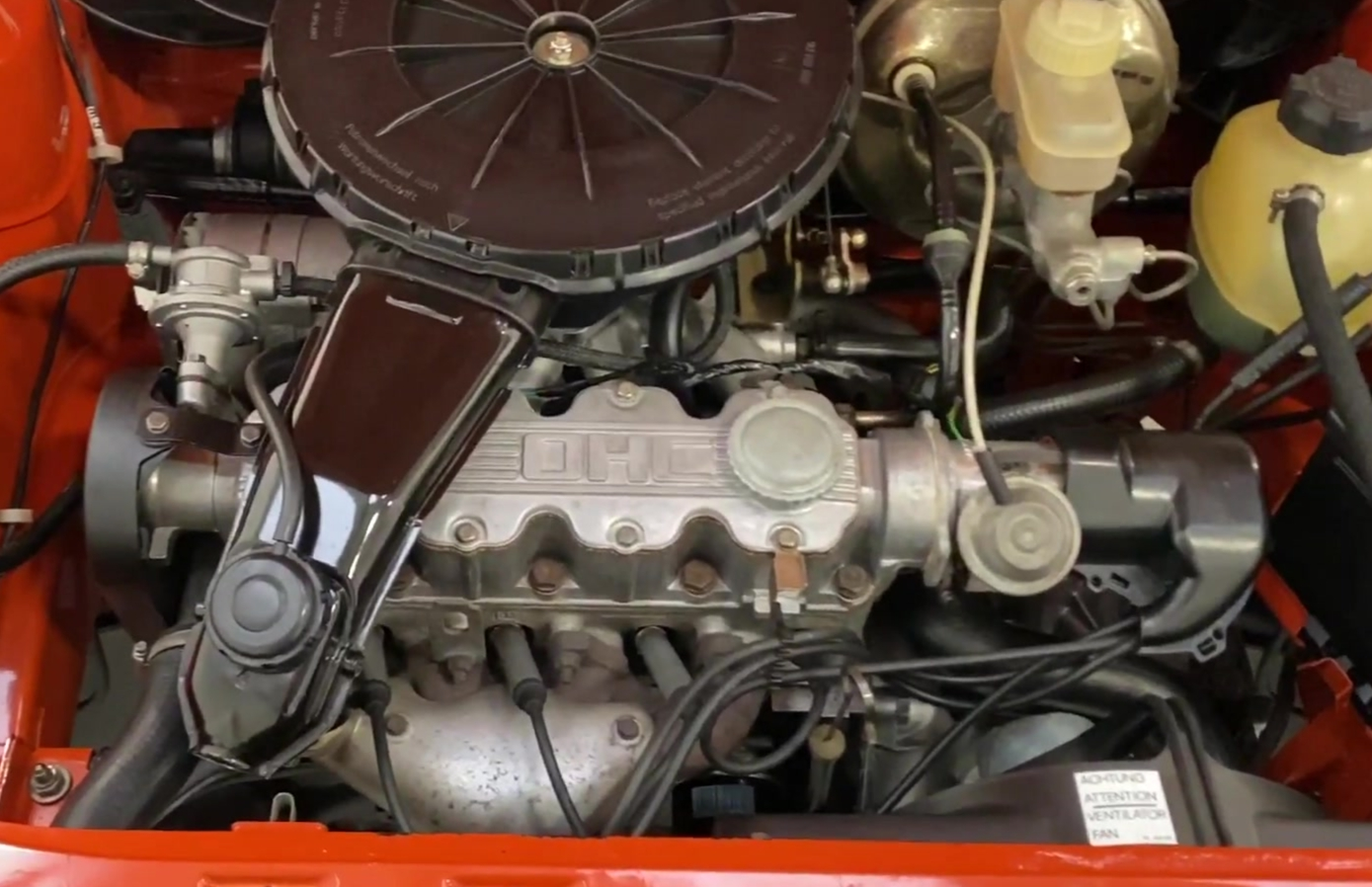
- The initial version (13S) of the Family I engine fitted to a 1980 Opel Kadett D

Overview
- Manufacturer: General Motors
- Also called: E-TEC; Ecotec; Family I; Small-block
- Production: 1979–present

Layout
- Configuration: Straight-four
- Cylinder block material: Cast iron
- Cylinder head material: Aluminium

Combustion
- Fuel type: Gasoline; CNG; Ethanol
- Oil system: Wet sump
- Cooling system: Water-cooled

Chronology
- Predecessor: Vauxhall OHV; Opel OHV; Opel CIH
- Successor: Family 0 (1.0 – 1.4 L); Medium Gasoline Engine (1.6 – 1.8 L)

The GM Family I is a straight-four piston engine that was developed by Opel, a former subsidiary of General Motors and now a subsidiary of PSA Group, to replace the Vauxhall OHV, Opel OHV and the smaller capacity Opel CIH engines for use on small to mid-range cars from Opel/Vauxhall. The engine first appeared in the Opel Kadett D in 1979, and shortly afterwards in its Vauxhall badged sister – the Vauxhall Astra Mk.1 in 1980. Despite this, the previous Opel OHV engine continued to be sold in entry level versions of the Opel Kadett/Astra and Corsa throughout the 1980s.

The Family I is informally known as the "small block", since it shares its basic design and architecture with the larger Family II unit (correspondingly known as the "large block"), which covers the mid range and higher engine capacities up to 2400cc.

Originally produced at the Aspern engine plant, production was moved to the Szentgotthárd engine plant in Hungary with the introduction of the DOHC version. GM do Brasil at São José dos Campos, GMDAT at Bupyeong and GM North America at Toluca also build these engines. The Family II units, by contrast were manufactured by Holden in Australia.

== Design ==
The Family 1 engines are inline-four cylinder engines with belt-driven single or double overhead camshafts in an aluminum cylinder head with a cast iron engine block. GM do Brasil versions were also capable of running on ethanol. These engines share their basic design with the larger Family II engine – for this reason some consider the Family I and Family II to be the same series and instead use the terms 'small block' and 'large block' to distinguish between the two. Over the years there has been overlap between the two types as the smallest capacities of the Family II have also been manufactured with larger capacity versions of the Family I block.

Early build versions of the engine gained a notorious reputation for camshaft and follower failure – this was largely due to a special lubricant being used in the engine during the running in period, which would be changed for conventional oil at the first service. Many owners (familiar with the servicing requirements of the older overhead valve units that the Family I/II replaced) would often exacerbate the problem by changing the oil themselves within the running in period. Opel solved the problem by improving the metallurgy of the camshaft and followers, and changing the lubrication specification. Another issue (also common to the Family II), revolved around the water pump, which sits in an eccentric shaped housing and doubles as the timing belt tensioner. If poor quality antifreeze (or if no antifreeze was used), corrosion would jam the water pump in its housing making it impossible to tension the belt. Later versions of the engine incorporate a separate tensioning/jockey pulley for tensioning the belt.

GM do Brasil specializes in SOHC, petrol-powered and FlexPower (powered with ethanol and/or petrol, mixed in any percentage) engines. GM Brasil also made 16-valve versions of the 1.0 engine. The 1.0 L 16v was available in the Corsa line-up from 1999 to 2001.

Opel engine codes explained
1. = Emissions controls	2./3. = Displacement (in tenths of liters)	4. = Compression ratio	5. = Fuel feed (only on gasoline engines)	5./6. = Special conditions	
empty = no emissions controls/ECE R83A	12 = 1.2 Liter	G = < 8.5:1	V = Carburetor	A = Egyptian market/revised version	P = High Output (until 2000)
E = Euronorm catalytic converter	14 = 1.4 Liter	L = > 8.5–9.0:1	Z = Single-point injection	B = Bedford/IBC	P = TwinPort (since 2000)
C = Euro 1, Three-way catalytic converter	16 = 1.6 liter	N = > 9.0–9.5:1	E = Multi-point injection	D = Daewoo (D-TEC)	Q = Colombia
X = Euro 2	17 = 1.7 liter	S = > 9.5–10.5:1	H = Direct injection	E = Ecoflex?	R = enhanced power
Y = Euro 3	18 = 1.8 liter	X = > 10.5–11.5:1	F = FlexFuel (E85)	F = government fleet (de-tuned)	S = Increased power/turbocharging
Z = Euro 4	20 = 2.0 liter	Y = > 11,5:1	L = LPG	G = Natural gas	T = Turbocharger/special version
A = Euro 5 (since 2007), Austria	25 = 2.5 liter	D = Diesel	N = Natural gas (often used with 6th character G)	H = high output/forced induction	U = Uruguay
B = Euro 6	28 = 2.8 liter			I = Irmscher	V = Volume model
D = Euro 6c	30 = 3.0 liter			J = adjusted output	W = Venezuela
F = Euro 6d	32 = 3.2 liter			K = Comprex	1 = Family 1 engine
H = Australian ADR 37 ("Holden")				L = reduced power/low pressure turbo	2 = Family II engine
S = Swedish/Swiss A 10/11 emissions				M = Middle East/Common Rail Diesel	empty = no special condition

== SOHC ==
SOHC
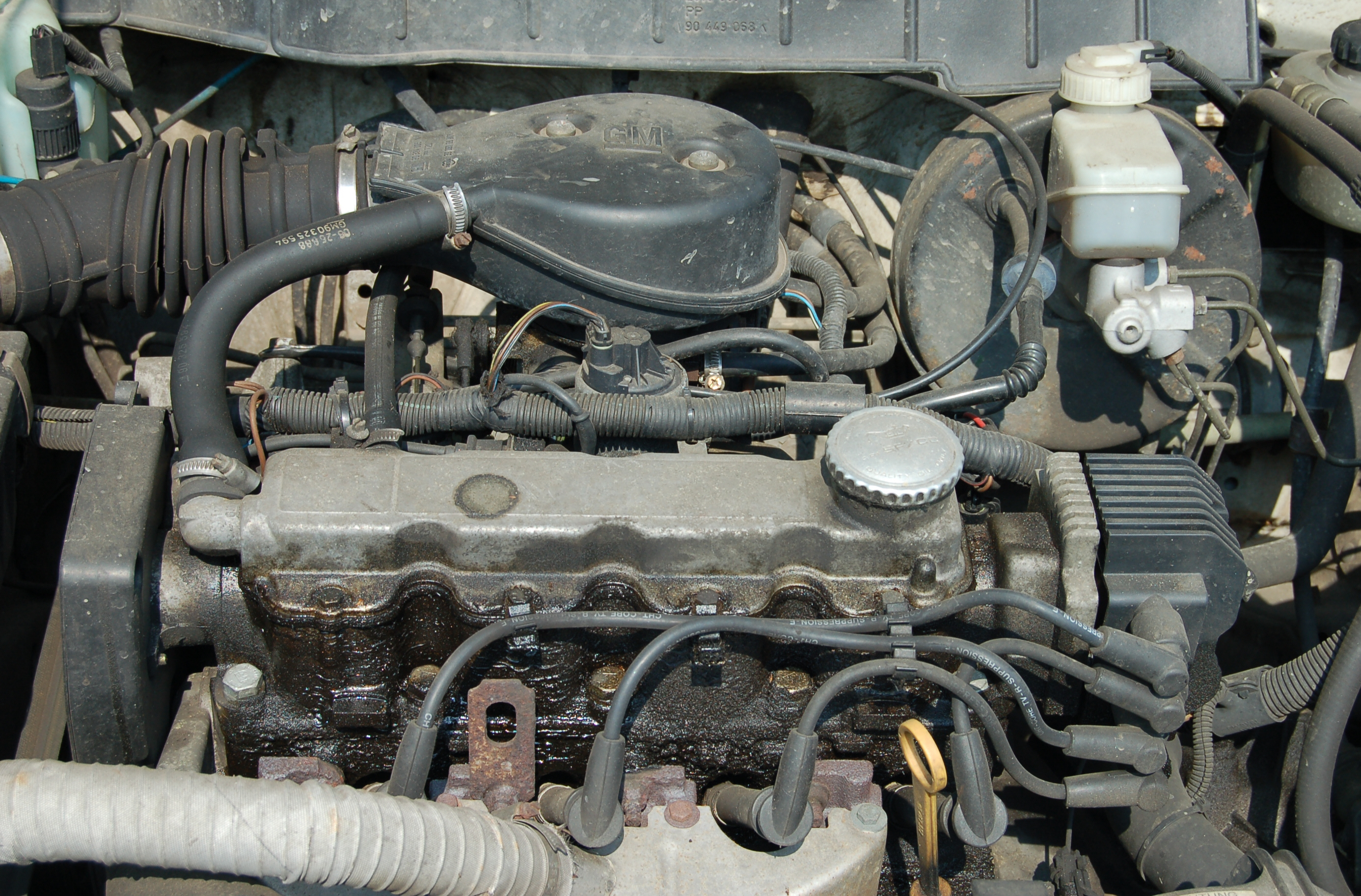
- A later fuel injected version (X16SZ) Family I engine in a 1993 Opel Astra F

Overview
- Production: 1979–present

Layout
- Displacement: 999 cc (61.0 cu in); 1,195 cc (72.9 cu in); 1,297 cc (79.1 cu in); 1,389 cc (84.8 cu in); 1,598 cc (97.5 cu in); 1,796 cc (109.6 cu in)
- Cylinder bore: 71.1 mm (2.80 in); 72.0 mm (2.83 in); 75.0 mm (2.95 in); 77.6 mm (3.06 in); 77.8 mm (3.06 in); 79.0 mm (3.11 in); 80.5 mm (3.17 in)
- Piston stroke: 62.9 mm (2.48 in); 73.4 mm (2.89 in); 81.5 mm (3.21 in); 88.2 mm (3.47 in)
- Valvetrain: Single overhead cam
- Compression ratio: 8.6:1; 9.5:1; 9.8:1

Combustion
- Fuel system: Carburetor; Throttle-body fuel injection; Multi-point fuel injection
- Fuel type: Gasoline; Ethanol

the first versions of the Family I appeared in the Opel Kadett D in 1979, and the corresponding Vauxhall Astra Mk.1 in the spring of 1980.

=== 1.0 ===
The 999 cc (61.0 cu in) version has a 71.1 mm (2.80 in) bore and a 62.9 mm (2.48 in) stroke.

Engine	Power	Torque	Compression Ratio	Fuel Delivery	Engine Management	Applications	Notes
C10YEH (VHC)	70–71 hp (51–52 kW) at 6400 rpm	86 N⋅m (63 lb⋅ft) at 3000 rpm		Multi-point fuel injection	Multec	Chevrolet Corsa/Classic	
X10YFL (Flexpower Classic)	70–72 hp (51–53 kW) at 6400 rpm	86–88 N⋅m (63–65 lb⋅ft) at 5200 rpm	12.6:1	Multi-point fuel injection	Multec FR4	Chevrolet Celta; Chevrolet Corsa/Classic	Higher outputs when using ethanol
X10YFH (VHC Flexpower)	77–78 hp (57–57 kW) at 6400 rpm	91–92 N⋅m (67–68 lb⋅ft) at 3200 rpm	12.6:1	Multi-point fuel injection	Motronic 7.9.9	Chevrolet Celta; Chevrolet Corsa	Higher outputs when using ethanol
N10YFH (VHC-E Flexpower)	77–78 hp (57–57 kW) at 6400 rpm	93–95 N⋅m (69–70 lb⋅ft) at 3200 rpm	12.6:1	Multi-point fuel injection	Multec MT27E	Chevrolet Celta; Chevrolet Classic; Chevrolet Prisma	Higher outputs when using ethanol

=== 1.2 ===
There are two iterations of the 1.2-liter Family 1 engine. As originally introduced it was called the 12ST (also A12ST and S12ST in versions for the Austrian, Swiss, and Swedish markets), it used a 77.8 mm (3.06 in) bore and a 62.9 mm (2.48 in) stroke to produce a displacement of 1,196 cc (73.0 cu in). This version, only carburetted, was used in the Opel Corsa. In around 1990 a new, version with 72.0 mm × 73.4 mm (2.83 in × 2.89 in) bore and stroke, a narrower bore version of the existing 1.3-litre version, displacing 1,195 cc (72.9 cu in), replaced the original design. This was also available with single-point fuel injection and with catalytic converters.

Engine	Power	Torque	Compression Ratio	Fuel Delivery	Cat.	Applications	Years
1196 cc, 77.8 mm × 62.9 mm (3.06 in × 2.48 in)
A12ST	50 hp (37 kW) at 5600 rpm	88 N⋅m (65 lb⋅ft) at 2200 rpm	9.2:1	Carburetor	–	Opel Corsa A (Austria)	
12ST/S12ST	55 hp (40 kW) at 5600 rpm	90 N⋅m (66 lb⋅ft) at 2200 rpm	9.2:1	Carburetor	–	Opel Corsa A	1982–1988
1195 cc, 72.0 mm × 73.4 mm (2.8 in × 2.9 in)
12NV	52 hp (38 kW) at 5800 rpm	86 N⋅m (63 lb⋅ft) at 2600 rpm	9.1:1	Carburetor	–	Opel Corsa A	1990–1992
12NZ	45 hp (33 kW) at 5000 rpm	88 N⋅m (65 lb⋅ft) at 2800 rpm	9.4:1	Single-point fuel injection	–	Opel Corsa B	1993–1995
C12NZ	45 hp (33 kW) at 5000 rpm	88 N⋅m (65 lb⋅ft) at 2400 rpm	9.4:1	Single-point fuel injection	●	Opel Corsa A Opel Corsa B	1990–1993; 1993–1995
X12SZ	45 hp (33 kW) at 4600 rpm	88 N⋅m (65 lb⋅ft) at 2800 rpm	10.0:1	Single-point fuel injection	●	Opel Corsa B	1995–1997

=== 1.3 ===
The 1,297 cc (79.1 cu in) version has a 75.0 mm (2.95 in) bore and a 73.4 mm (2.89 in) stroke.

Engine	Power	Torque	Compression Ratio	Fuel Delivery	Engine Management	Applications
13N	60 hp (44 kW) at 5800 rpm	94–96 N⋅m (69–71 lb⋅ft) at 3800 rpm				Opel Ascona B; Opel Ascona C; Opel Kadett D; Opel Kadett E; Opel Manta B
13Nb	60 hp (44 kW) at 5800 rpm	96 N⋅m (71 lb⋅ft) at 3200 rpm				Opel Corsa A
13S	68–75 hp (50–55 kW) at 5800 rpm	96–101 N⋅m (71–74 lb⋅ft) at 3800–4600 rpm				Opel Ascona B; Opel Ascona C; Opel Kadett D; Opel Kadett E; Opel Manta B
13SB	70 hp (51 kW) at 5800 rpm	101 N⋅m (74 lb⋅ft) at 3800–4200 rpm				Opel Corsa A
13SH	83 hp (61 kW) at 5800 rpm	108 N⋅m (80 lb⋅ft) at 4200 rpm	9,5:1	Multi-point fuel injection	Bosch LE-Jetronic	Opel Corsa A (Irmscher)

=== 1.4 ===
The 1,389 cc (84.8 cu in) version has a 77.6 mm (3.06 in) bore and a 73.4 mm (2.89 in) stroke.

Engine	Power	Torque	Compression Ratio	Fuel Delivery	Engine Management	Applications
14NV	72 hp (53 kW) at 5600 rpm 75 hp (55 kW) at 5600 rpm	106 N⋅m (78 lb⋅ft) at 3000 rpm	9.4:1	Pierburg 2E3 twin barrel carburettor		1989–1992 Opel Corsa A; 1988–1992 Vauxhall Cavalier
C14NZ	60 hp (44 kW) at 5600 rpm	101 N⋅m (74 lb⋅ft) at 2800 rpm	9.4:1	Single-point fuel injection		1990–1996 Opel Astra F; 1990–1996 Opel Corsa B; 1994–1996 Opel Combo B; 1990–1993 Vauxhall Belmont
C14SE	82 hp (60 kW) at 5800 rpm	116 N⋅m (86 lb⋅ft) at 3400 rpm	9.8:1	Multi-point fuel injection		1991–1993 Opel Corsa A; 1993–1996 Opel Corsa B; 1991–1996 Opel Astra F; 1994–1996 Opel Combo B
						Chevrolet Kalos/Aveo
X14YFL	89 hp (65 kW) at 6200 rpm; 95 hp (70 kW) at 6000 rpm	122 N⋅m (90 lb⋅ft) at 3200 rpm; 129 N⋅m (95 lb⋅ft) at 2800 rpm	12.4:1	Multi-point fuel injection		2006–2009 Chevrolet Prisma; 2009–2012 Chevrolet Prisma
X14YFH	99 hp (73 kW) at 6000 rpm	129 N⋅m (95 lb⋅ft) at 2800 rpm	12.4:1	Multi-point fuel injection		2007–2012 Chevrolet Corsa; 2007–2012 Chevrolet Montana
X14YFH	98 hp (72 kW) at 6200 rpm	127 N⋅m (94 lb⋅ft) at 2800 rpm	12.4:1	Multi-point fuel injection		2013–2019 Chevrolet Prisma Mk II
N14YF	97–102 hp (72–76 kW) at 6000 rpm	126–132 N⋅m (93–97 lbf⋅ft) at 3200 rpm	12.4:1	Multi-point fuel injection		Chevrolet Cobalt; Chevrolet Agile

=== 1.6 ===
The 1,598 cc (97.5 cu in) version has a 79.0 mm (3.11 in) bore and an 81.5 mm (3.21 in) stroke.

Engine	Power	Torque	Compression Ratio	Fuel Delivery	Engine Management	Applications
C16NZ	72–75 hp (54–56 kW) at 5200 rpm	125 N⋅m (92 lb⋅ft) at 2800 rpm	9.2:1	Single-point Fuel Injection		Opel Corsa A; 1988–1992 Opel Vectra A/Vauxhall Cavalier, Opel Kadett E, Opel Astra F
C16NE	89 hp (66 kW) at 5600 rpm	94 lb⋅ft (127 N⋅m) at 2800 rpm	9.2:1	multi-point fuel injection		1997-2004 Chevrolet Chevy (Mexico)
C16SE	100 hp (75 kW) at 5800 rpm	135 N⋅m (100 lb⋅ft) at 3400 rpm	9.8:1	multi-point fuel injection		Opel Astra F; Opel Corsa A
C16SEI	98 hp (73 kW) at 5600 rpm	132 N⋅m (97 lb⋅ft) at 3400 rpm				Opel Corsa A
E16SE	100 hp (75 kW) at 5800 rpm	135 N⋅m (100 lb⋅ft) at 3400 rpm				Opel Corsa A
L73	74 hp (55 kW) at 5600 rpm	120 N⋅m (90 lb⋅ft) at 2800 rpm	8.6:1	throttle-body fuel injection		1991–1993 Asüna SE/GT; 1988–1993 Pontiac LeMans VL/LE; 1988–1991 Passport Optima
G16SF	92 hp (68 kW) at 5600 rpm			throttle-body fuel injection	GM Multec Central	1988–1993 Pontiac LeMans LS; 1988–1991 Passport Optima
Y16NE	100 hp (75 kW) at 5600 rpm	138 N⋅m (102 lb⋅ft) at 3200 rpm	9.4:1	multi-point fuel injection		2004-2012 Chevrolet Chevy (Mexico)
Z16SE	64 kW (86 hp) at 5400 rpm	133 N⋅m (98 lb⋅ft) at 2600 rpm	9.6:1	multi-point fuel injection		Opel Astra G; Opel Combo C; Opel Corsa C
L91	79 kW (106 hp) at 6400 rpm	143 N⋅m (105 lb⋅ft) at 3800 rpm	10.8:1	multi-point fuel injection		Chevrolet Aveo
X16SZ	52 kW (72 hp) at 5000 rpm	128 Nm at 2800 rpm	10.0:1	Single-point fuel injection	Multec-SZ	Opel Vectra A Opel Astra F
16SV	82 bhp at 5400 rpm	130 N⋅m (96 lb⋅ft) at 2600 rpm		Carburettor		Vauxhall Cavalier MK3; MK2 Astra

=== 1.8 ===
The 1,796 cc (109.6 cu in) version has an 80.5 mm (3.17 in) bore and an 88.2 mm (3.47 in) stroke.

Engine	Power	Torque	Compression Ratio	Fuel Delivery	Engine Management	Applications
N18XFH	106–115 hp (79–86 kW) at 5600 rpm	161–168 N⋅m (119–124 lb⋅ft) at 3200 rpm	10.5:1	Multi-point fuel injection		Chevrolet Corsa; Chevrolet Montana
F18S2	98-102 hp at 5200 rpm	146-149 Nm at 2800 rpm		multi-point fuel injection		Chevrolet Rezzo Daewoo Tacuma Daewoo Leganza

Applications:

- Chevrolet Corsa
- Chevrolet Montana
- Opel Meriva
- Fiat Palio
- Fiat Siena
- Fiat Strada
- Fiat Idea
- Fiat Punto
- Fiat Stilo

== SPE / 4 ==
The SPE / 4 or (Smart Performance Economy 4 cylinders) engines are an evolution of the Econo.Flex engines that were made in Brazil at the Joinville plant. There are two available displacements: 1.0 L and 1.4 L. They feature an SOHC head with 2-valves per cylinder, and is fed by a multi-point fuel injection system, which allows it to run on either E100 (pure ethanol) or E25 gasoline (standard in Brazil). Major differences between previous engines include reduced friction, lowered weight, individual coil-near-plug ignition, and a new cylinder head design.

Name	Displacement	Bore	Stroke	Compression Ratio	Power	Torque	Applications
	1.0 L (999 cc)	71.1 mm (2.8 in)	62.9 mm (2.5 in)	12.4:1	78 hp (58 kW) at 6400 rpm (Petrol); 80 hp (60 kW) at 6400 rpm (Ethanol)	93 N⋅m (69 lb⋅ft) at 5200 rpm (Petrol); 96 N⋅m (71 lb⋅ft) at 5200 rpm (Ethanol)	2013–present Chevrolet Onix; 2013–present Chevrolet Prisma
	1.4 L (1389 cc)	77.6 mm (3.1 in)	73.4 mm (2.9 in)	12.4:1	98 hp (73 kW) at 6000 rpm (Petrol); 106 hp (79 kW) at 6000 rpm (Ethanol)	127 N⋅m (94 lb⋅ft) at 4800 rpm (Petrol); 136 N⋅m (100 lb⋅ft) at 4800 rpm (Ethanol)	2013–present Chevrolet Onix; 2013–present Chevrolet Prisma

== DOHC ==
DOHC
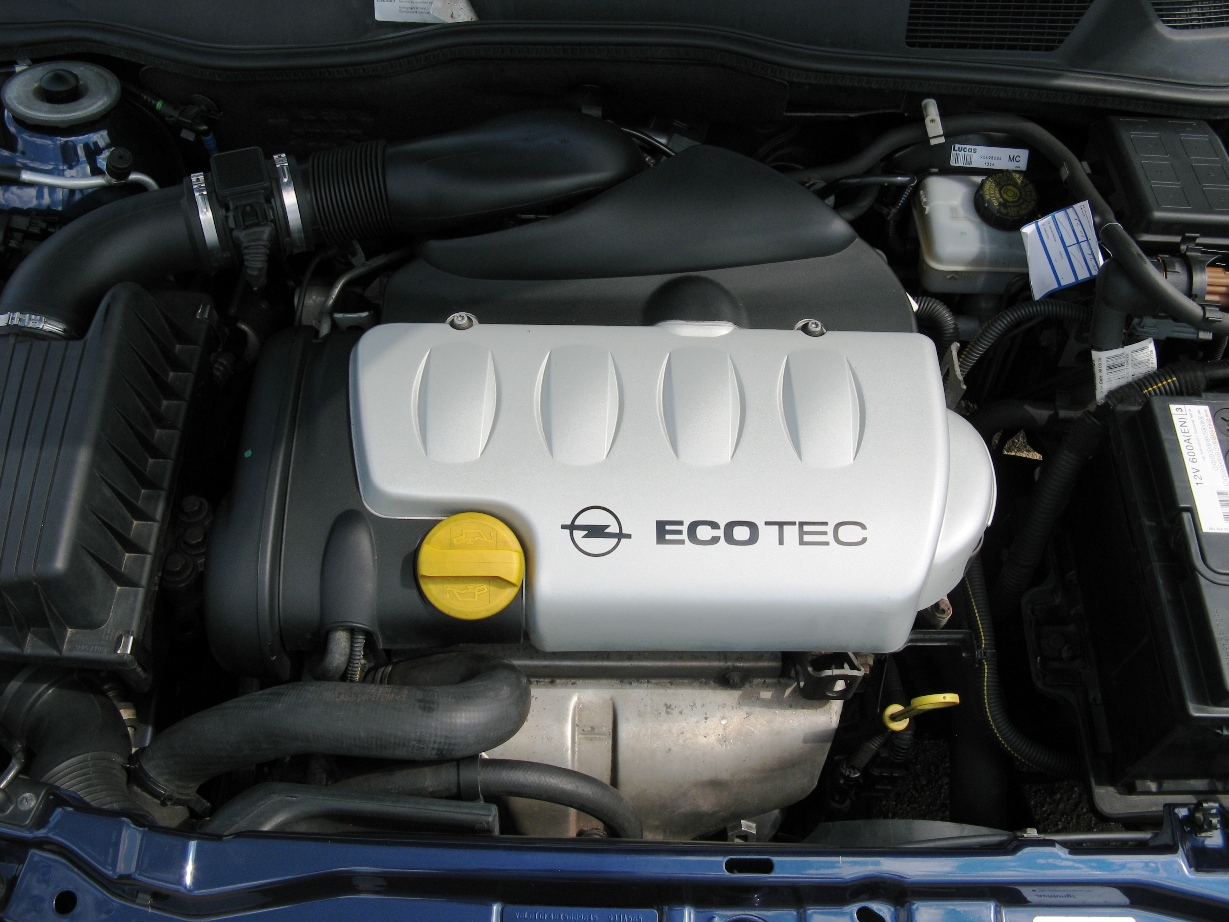
- X18XE1

Overview
- Production: (1.4, 1.6L engines):1992-present, (1.8L x18xe1):1999-2000, (1.8L z18xe):2000-2008

Layout
- Configuration: Straight-4
- Displacement: 1,389 cc (84.8 cu in); 1,598 cc (97.5 cu in); 1,796 cc (109.6 cu in)
- Cylinder bore: 77.6 mm (3.06 in); 79 mm (3.1 in); 80.5 mm (3.17 in)
- Piston stroke: 73.4 mm (2.89 in); 81.5 mm (3.21 in); 88.2 mm (3.47 in)
- Valvetrain: Dual overhead cam
- Compression ratio: 10.5:1

Combustion
- Fuel system: Sequential multi-port fuel injection
- Fuel type: Gasoline

=== Pre-Ecotec ===
This was the first engine in this family, featuring a Lotus-developed 16-valve cylinder head and a cast-iron cylinder block which was essentially the same as in Opel's 8-valve engines. C16XE was available only in Corsa GSi, model years 1993 and 1994. C16XE was not yet badged Ecotec, and for later model Corsas and Opel Tigras it was replaced with X16XE Ecotec engine. The main difference between C16XE and X16XE Ecotec is emission control, C16XE lacks EGR and AIR-system, although the cylinder head is designed to enable these features. Other differences between C16XE and later versions of the engine include intake manifold, C16XE has a plastic upper intake manifold, which was replaced with a cast aluminium manifold, and fuel injection system, C16XE uses Multec fuel injection with MAF sensor and later models used Multec fuel injection with MAP sensor. Also, while C16XE had its own exhaust front section design, for X16XE it was replaced with a front section used also in Opel Astra, probably as a cost-saving measure.

Name	Displacement	Bore	Stroke	Compression Ratio	Power
C16XE	1.6 L (1598 cc)	79 mm (3.1 in)	81.5 mm (3.21 in)	10.5:1	80 kW (110 hp)

Applications:

- 1993–1994 Opel Corsa GSi

=== Ecotec ===
The first generation Ecotec engines are belt-driven 16-valve DOHC engines, with cast-iron cylinder blocks and aluminum cross-flow cylinder heads. They feature sodium-filled exhaust valves, a cast steel crankshaft, and a spheroidal graphite flywheel. They also feature exhaust gas recirculation (EGR), secondary air injection, and Multec M engine control with sequential multiport fuel injection. The 1.6 L version was also exported for use in the Brazilian Corsa GSi.

Name	Displacement	Bore	Stroke	Compression Ratio	Power	Torque
X14XE	1.4 L (1389 cc)	77.6 mm (3.1 in)	73.4 mm (2.9 in)	10.5:1	66 kW (89 hp)	125 N⋅m (92 lb⋅ft)
X16XEL	1.6 L (1598 cc)	79 mm (3.1 in)	81.5 mm (3.2 in)	10.5:1	74 kW (99 hp)	150 N⋅m (110 lb⋅ft)
X16XE	1.6 L (1598 cc)	79 mm (3.1 in)	81.5 mm (3.2 in)	10.5:1	78 kW (105 hp)	150 N⋅m (110 lb⋅ft)
X18XE1	1.8 L (1796 cc)	80.5 mm (3.2 in)	88.2 mm (3.5 in)	10.5:1	85 kW (114 hp)	167 N⋅m (123 lb⋅ft)

Applications:

- 1994–2000 Opel Corsa
- 1994–2000 Opel Tigra
- 1999–2005 Opel Zafira using Siemens Simtec ECU
- Opel Astra
- Opel Vectra
- 2004–2008 Chevrolet Viva
- Fiat Stilo
- Chevrolet Corsa GSi/GLS
- Buick Excelle

==== Electronic throttle ====
Updated version introduced from 2000, with lighter cast-iron cylinder block and camshaft driven by toothed belt. Features EGR valve and electronic throttle for reduced emissions.

Name	Displacement	Bore	Stroke	Compression Ratio	Power	Torque	Applications
Z14XE	1.4 L (1389 cc)	77.6 mm (3.1 in)	73.4 mm (2.9 in)	10.5:1	66 kW (89 hp)	120 N⋅m (89 lb⋅ft)	2000–2004 Opel Astra G; 2000–2003 Opel Corsa C
Z16XE	1.6 L (1598 cc)	79 mm (3.1 in)	81.5 mm (3.2 in)	10.5:1	74 kW (99 hp)	150 N⋅m (110 lb⋅ft)	Opel Astra G; Opel Meriva
Z18XE	1.8 L (1796 cc)	80.5 mm (3.2 in)	88.2 mm (3.5 in)	10.5:1	90 kW (120 hp); 92 kW (123 hp)	167 N⋅m (123 lb⋅ft)	2006–2008 Chevrolet Niva; 2004–2009 Saab 9-3; Opel Astra; Opel Corsa C; Opel Meriva; Opel Signum; Opel Tigra; Opel Vectra; Opel Zafira
Z16XEP	1.6 L (1598 cc)	79 mm (3.1 in)	81.5 mm (3.2 in)	10.5:1	77 kW (103 hp)	150 N⋅m (110 lb⋅ft)	Opel Astra G; Opel Astra H; Opel Zafira B; Opel Meriva A; Opel Vectra C

Ecotec TwinPort Family 1 engine (Z16XEP) is used in:

- Opel Zafira 2005–2007
- Opel Meriva 2005–2010
- Opel Astra 2003–2004 2004–2007
- Opel Vectra 2006–2008

== E-TEC ==
E-TEC
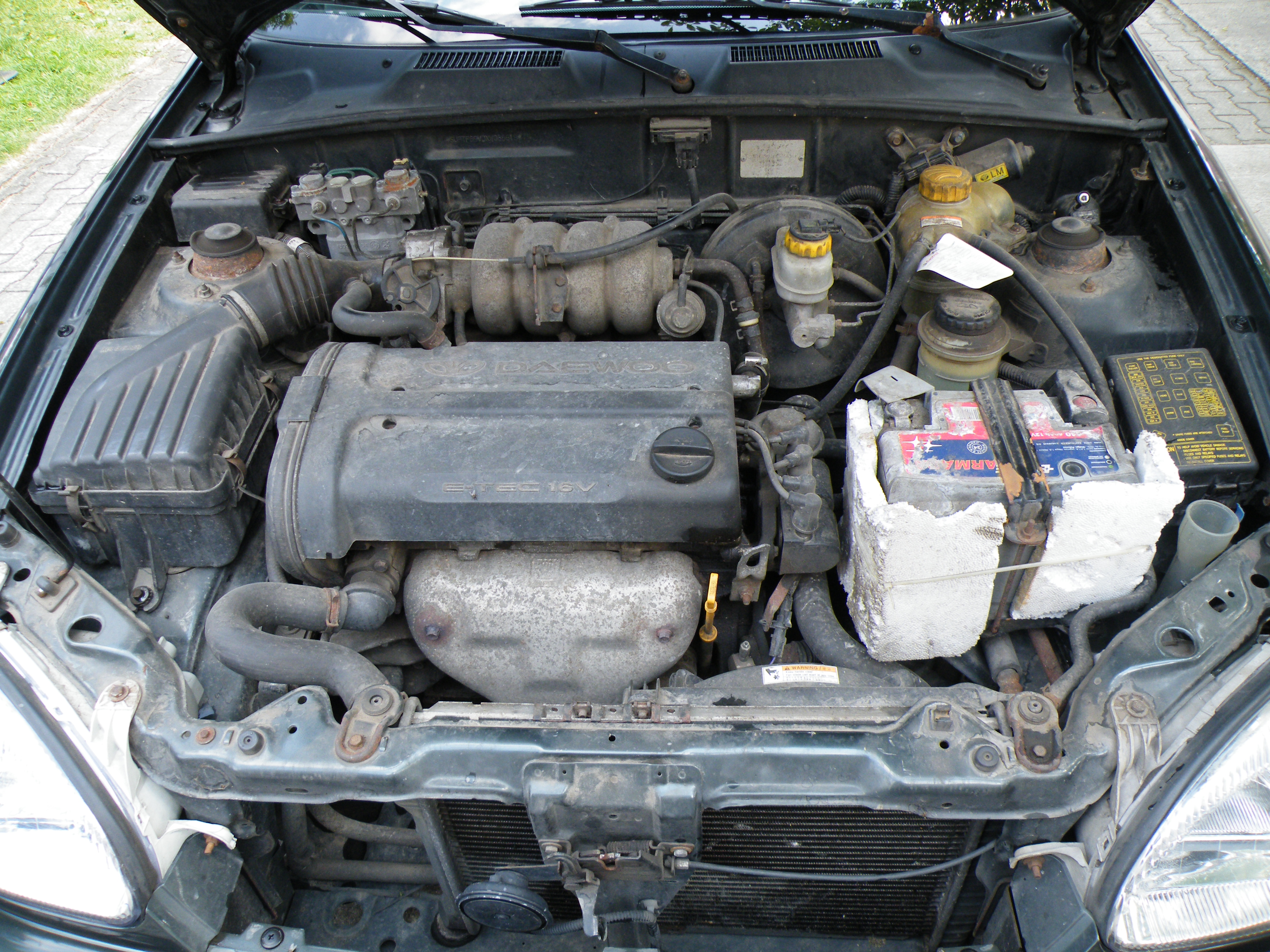
- 1.5 L E-TEC 16V

Overview
- Also called: E-Tec; E-TEC II; E-TEC 16V; E-TEC II 16V
- Production: -2009

Layout
- Displacement: 1299 cc; 1349 cc; 1399 cc; 1498 cc; 1598 cc
- Cylinder bore: 76.5 mm (3.01 in); 77.6 mm (3.06 in); 79.0 mm (3.11 in)
- Piston stroke: 73.4 mm (2.89 in); 81.5 mm (3.21 in)
- Valvetrain: Single overhead cam; Double overhead cam

Combustion
- Fuel system: Sequential multi-port fuel injection
- Fuel type: Gasoline

Daewoo Motors independently produced a variant of the Family 1 engine. These engines were built exclusively at Bupyeong engine plant and marketed as E-TEC. Like all Family 1 engines they feature a toothed belt driven valvetrain, a cast-iron engine block and an aluminum cylinder head. Most models feature Euro III-compliancy, and the 1.4 L (1399 cc) and 1.6 L (1598cc) versions employ variable intake geometry. With the release of Chevrolet Cruze, the factory has been converted to produce the Ecotec Family 1 Gen III block.

=== SOHC ===
Name	Displacement	Bore	Stroke	Compression Ratio	Power	Torque
A13SMS	1.3 L (1299 cc)	76.5 mm (3.01 in)	71.5 mm (2.81 in)			
A13SMS	1.4 L (1349 cc)	76.5 mm (3.01 in)	73.4 mm (2.89 in)			
A15SMS	1.5 L (1498 cc)	76.5 mm (3.01 in)	81.5 mm (3.21 in)	9,5 : 1	85 PS (63 kW; 84 hp) at 5800 rpm	130 N⋅m (96 lb⋅ft) at 3400 rpm
G15SF/G15MF	1.5 L (1498 cc)	76.5 mm (3.01 in)	81.5 mm (3.21 in)		70 PS (51 kW; 69 hp) at 5200 rpm	117 N⋅m (86 lb⋅ft) at 3000 rpm

Applications:

- Daewoo Lanos
- Daewoo Racer/Pointer *Only in Chile
- Daewoo LeMans
- Daewoo Espero
- Daewoo Nexia
- Chevrolet Lacetti
- Chevrolet Nubira
- Chevrolet Aveo

=== DOHC ===
The E-TEC II 16V is an updated version of the E-TEC engines with DOHC.

Name	Displacement	Bore	Stroke	Compression Ratio	Power	Torque
F14D4 (L95)	1.4 L (1399 cc)	77.9 mm (3.1 in)	73.4 mm (2.9 in)	9.5:1	70 kW (95 PS; 94 hp) at 6200 rpm	127 N⋅m (94 lb⋅ft) at 3400 rpm
(LDT)	1.4 L (1399 cc)	77.9 mm (3.1 in)	73.4 mm (2.9 in)	9.5:1	74 kW (101 PS; 99 hp) at 6400 rpm	131 N⋅m (97 lb⋅ft) at 4200 rpm
A15MF	1.5 L (1498 cc)	76.5 mm (3.0 in)	81.5 mm (3.2 in)	9.5:1	63 kW (86 PS; 84 hp) at 5400 rpm	131 N⋅m (97 lb⋅ft) at 3000 rpm
(L91)	1.6 L (1598 cc)	79 mm (3.1 in)	81.5 mm (3.2 in)	9.5:1	77 kW (103 hp) at 6000 rpm	145 N⋅m (107 lb⋅ft) at 3600 rpm
(LXT)	1.6 L (1598 cc)	79 mm (3.1 in)	81.5 mm (3.2 in)	9.5:1	77 kW (103 hp) at 5800 rpm	145 N⋅m (107 lb⋅ft) at 3400 rpm

Applications:

- Chevrolet Aveo
- Daewoo Lacetti
- Daewoo Lanos
- Daewoo Espero
- Daewoo Nexia
- Daewoo Tacuma

== Generation III ==
Generation III

Overview
- Also called: Fam1 Gen3; Gen III; Gen 3; Generation 3
- Production: 2005–present

Layout
- Configuration: Straight-4
- Displacement: 1,598 cc (97.5 cu in); 1,796 cc (109.6 cu in)
- Cylinder bore: 79 mm (3.1 in); 80.5 mm (3.17 in)
- Piston stroke: 81.5 mm (3.21 in); 88.2 mm (3.47 in)
- Valvetrain: Dual overhead cam

Combustion
- Turbocharger: Some version
- Fuel system: Sequential multi-port fuel injection
- Fuel type: Gasoline; CNG

The new Generation III or Gen III engine entered production in Spring 2005. These engines replaced both the previous generation Ecotec engines as well as Daewoo's E-TEC 16V engines. These engines are manufactured at Szentgotthárd, Hungary, Bupyeoung, Korea, Toluca, Mexico and Yantai, PRC (SGM).

In contrast to their predecessors, the Gen III engines feature lighter cast-iron blocks, as well as higher compression ratios. These engines also implement DCVCP (Double Continuous Variable Cam Phasing technology, a variant of VVT), piston cooling by oil jets, and an integrated catalytic converter. Non-turbocharged variants feature the TwinPort (Variable-length intake manifold) technology. Reliability improvements include a wider camshaft drive belt, and a water pump no longer driven by it.

The LDE engine meets Euro VI and KULEV emission standards. With the addition of secondary air injection to the LUW engine, the LWE achieves PZEV status.

These engines, like their DOHC predecessors, feature bucket tappets in contrast to the roller finger followers found on GM's other 4-cylinder engines.

Name	Displacement	Bore	Stroke	Compression Ratio	Power	Torque
Z16XER	1.6 L (1598 cc)	79 mm (3.1 in)	81.5 mm (3.2 in)	10.8:1	85 kW (114 hp) at 6000 rpm	155 N⋅m (114 lb⋅ft) at 4000 rpm
A16XER (LDE)	1.6 L (1598 cc)	79 mm (3.1 in)	81.5 mm (3.2 in)	10.8:1	85 kW (114 hp) at 6000 rpm	155 N⋅m (114 lb⋅ft) at 4000 rpm
(LXV)	1.6 L (1598 cc)	79 mm (3.1 in)	81.5 mm (3.2 in)	10.8:1	81 kW (110 PS) at 6400 rpm	142 N⋅m (105 lb⋅ft) at 4000 rpm
(LGE)	1.6 L (1598 cc)	79 mm (3.1 in)	81.5 mm (3.2 in)	10.5:1	110 kW (150 PS) at 5000 rpm	210 N⋅m (150 lb⋅ft) at 2300–5000 rpm (CNG); 180 N⋅m (130 lb⋅ft) at 2300–5000 rpm (Gasoline)
Z16LEL	1.6 L (1598 cc)	79 mm (3.1 in)	81.5 mm (3.2 in)	8.8:1	110 kW (150 PS) at 5000 rpm	210 N⋅m (150 lb⋅ft) at 1850–5000 rpm
A16LEL	1.6 L (1598 cc)	79 mm (3.1 in)	81.5 mm (3.2 in)	8.8:1	110 kW (150 PS) at 5000 rpm	210 N⋅m (150 lb⋅ft) at 1850–5000 rpm
Z16LET	1.6 L (1598 cc)	79 mm (3.1 in)	81.5 mm (3.2 in)	8.8:1	132 kW (179 PS) at 5500 rpm	230 N⋅m (170 lb⋅ft) at 2200–5400 rpm
A16LET (LLU)	1.6 L (1598 cc)	79 mm (3.1 in)	81.5 mm (3.2 in)	8.8:1	132 kW (179 PS) at 5500 rpm	230 N⋅m (170 lb⋅ft) at 2200–5400 rpm
Z16LER	1.6 L (1598 cc)	79 mm (3.1 in)	81.5 mm (3.2 in)	8.8:1	141 kW (192 PS) at 5000 rpm	230 N⋅m (170 lb⋅ft) at 1980–5800 rpm
A16LER (LDW) (B16LER)	1.6 L (1598 cc)	79 mm (3.1 in)	81.5 mm (3.2 in)	8.8:1	141 kW (192 PS) at 5850 rpm	230 N⋅m (170 lbf⋅ft); 266 N⋅m (196 lbf⋅ft) at 1980–5850 rpm (Overboost)
A16LES (B16LES)	1.6 L (1598 cc)	79 mm (3.1 in)	81.5 mm (3.2 in)	8.8:1	154 kW (209 PS) at 5850 rpm	250 N⋅m (180 lbf⋅ft); 280 N⋅m (210 lbf⋅ft) at 2250–5850 rpm (Overboost)
X18XF (Flex)	1.8 L (1796 cc)	80.5 mm (3.2 in)	88.2 mm (3.5 in)	10.5:1	84 kW (113 hp) at 5600 rpm	175 N⋅m (129 lb⋅ft) at 2800 rpm
Z18XER	1.8 L (1796 cc)	80.5 mm (3.2 in)	88.2 mm (3.5 in)	10.5:1	103 kW (140 PS) at 6300 rpm	175 N⋅m (129 lb⋅ft) at 3800 rpm
A18XER (2H0) (F18DA)	1.8 L (1796 cc)	80.5 mm (3.2 in)	88.2 mm (3.5 in)	10.5:1	103 kW (140 PS) at 6300 rpm	175 N⋅m (129 lb⋅ft) at 3800 rpm
P18XER (LWE)	1.8 L (1796 cc)	80.5 mm (3.2 in)	88.2 mm (3.5 in)	10.5:1	103 kW (140 PS) at 6300 rpm	175 N⋅m (129 lb⋅ft) at 3800 rpm
U18XFR (LUW)	1.8 L (1796 cc)	80.5 mm (3.2 in)	88.2 mm (3.5 in)	10.5:1	103 kW (140 PS) at 6300 rpm	175 N⋅m (129 lb⋅ft) at 3800 rpm
N18XFF (LFH)	1.8 L (1796 cc)	80.5 mm (3.2 in)	88.2 mm (3.5 in)	10.5:1	107 kW (143 hp) at 6300 rpm	185 N⋅m (136 lb⋅ft) at 3800 rpm

Applications:

- 2005–2008 Opel Vectra (Z18XER)
- 2007–2008 Opel Signum (Z18XER)
- 2005–2019 Opel Zafira
- 2005–2012 Opel Astra
- 2008–2016 Chevrolet Cruze (1.8L LUW/2H0/LDE/LWE)
- 2009–2017 Opel Insignia
- 2009–2014 Chevrolet Aveo (1.6L in Europe, 1.6L LXV)
- 2012–2018 Chevrolet Sonic (1.8L LUW/LWE in North America)
- 2011–2015 Chevrolet Orlando (1.8L 2H0)
- 2007–2009 Holden Astra (AH)
- 2012–2013 Baojun 630
- Alfa Romeo 159
- 2005–2011 Fiat Croma
- 2012–2018 Opel Mokka

Turbocharged Gen III engines are used in:

- 2006–2009 Opel Meriva (OPC Model)
- 2007–2018 Opel Corsa (GSi and OPC Models)
- 2008–2012 Opel Insignia
- 2010–2015 Buick Excelle GT
- 2010–2015 Buick Excelle XT
- 2011–2012 Saab 9-5
- 2007–2012 Opel Astra
- 2012–2017 Buick Verano (1.6 Turbo)
- 2012–2020 Chevrolet Sonic (LT, LTZ Models)
- 2011–2020 Chevrolet Cruze (China, North America) and Holden Cruze (Australasia)
- 2016–present Chevrolet Malibu
