= Opel Tigra =

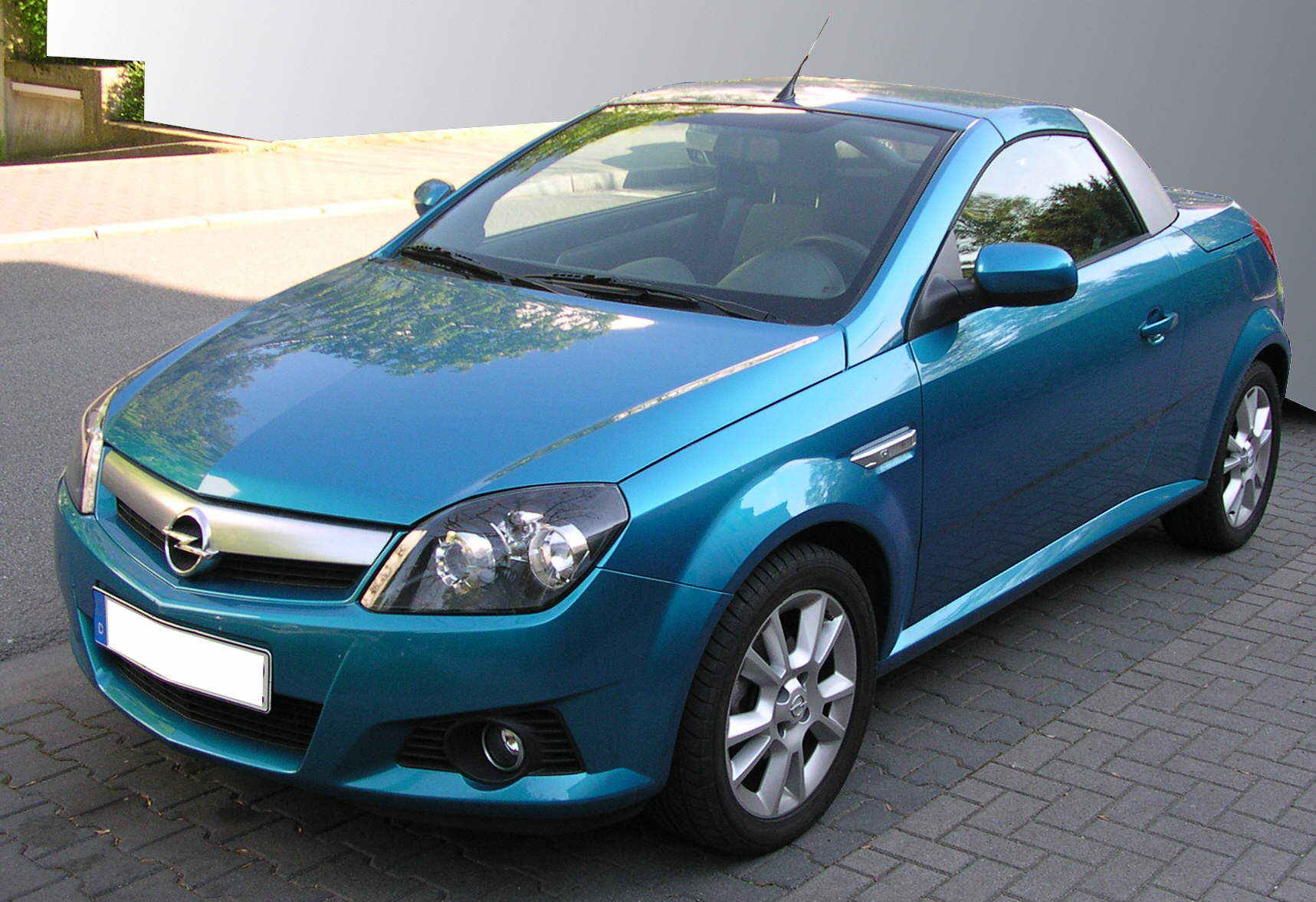

Overview
- Manufacturer: Opel (General Motors)
- Also called: Vauxhall Tigra
- Production: 1994–2000; 2004–2009

Body and chassis
- Class: Sport compact
- Layout: Front-engine, front-wheel-drive

The Opel Tigra name has been applied to two different cars engineered and produced by the German automaker Opel, both based on different iterations of the Corsa supermini, the first built in Spain, the second in France. The first Tigra was a small 2+2 coupé, produced from 1994 to 2000. The later compact hard topped convertible roadster model was introduced in May 2004.

The Tigra was sold in the United Kingdom as the Vauxhall Tigra, in Australia as the Holden Tigra, and in Brazil, Argentina, and Mexico as the Chevrolet Tigra.

== Tigra A (1994–2000) ==
Tigra A
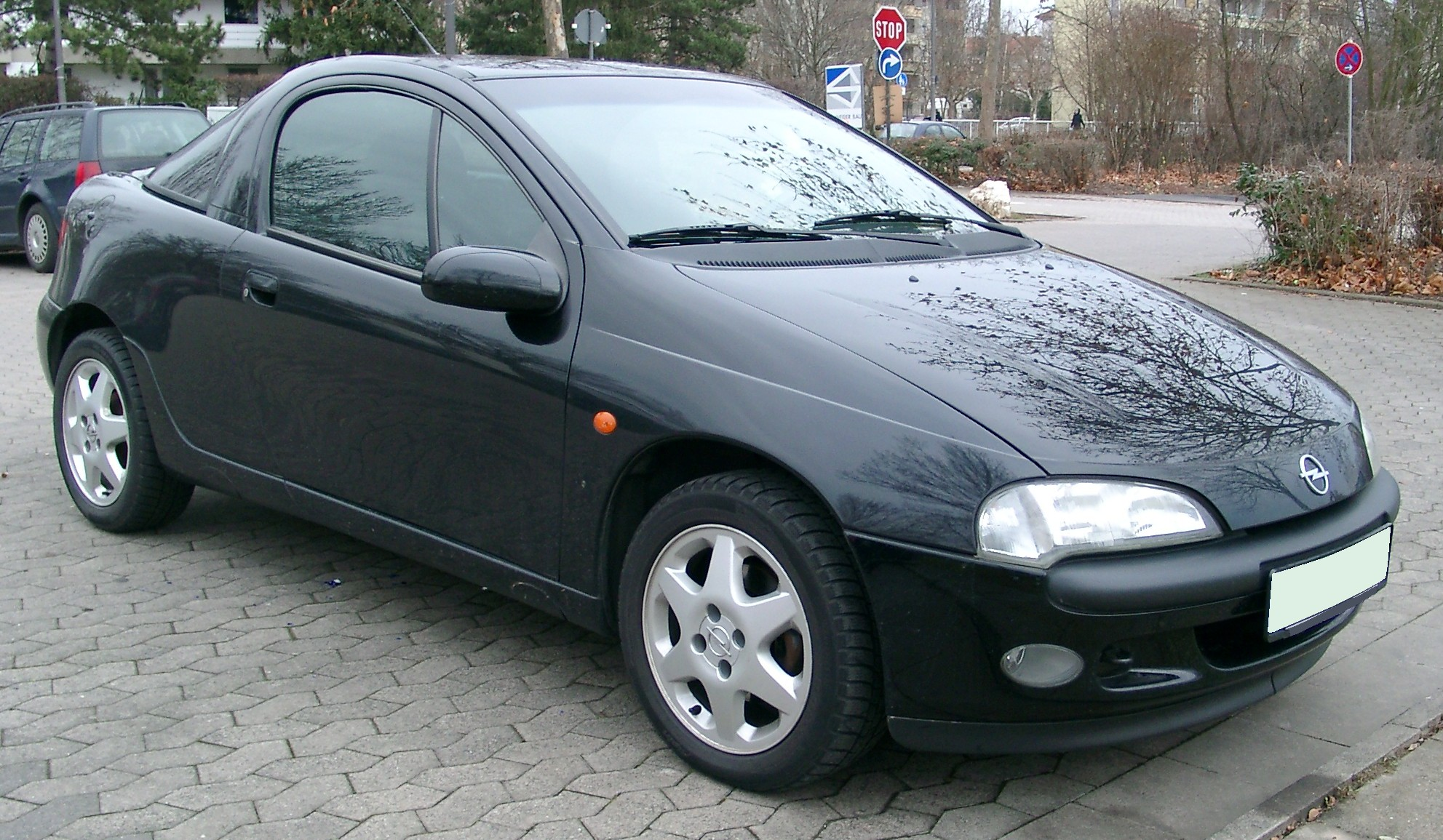

Overview
- Also called: Vauxhall Tigra (United Kingdom); Chevrolet Tigra (Latin America)
- Production: September 1994 – July 2000
- Assembly: Spain: Zaragoza (Opel Pirenauto Zaragoza)
- Designer: Hideo Kodama

Body and chassis
- Body style: 2-door coupé
- Platform: GM4200
- Related: Opel Corsa B

Powertrain
- Engine: Petrol: 1.4 L X14XE I4; 1.6 L X16XE I4
- Transmission: 4-speed automatic; 5-speed manual

Dimensions
- Wheelbase: 2,429 mm (95.6 in)
- Length: 3,922 mm (154.4 in)
- Width: 1,604 mm (63.1 in)
- Height: 1,340 mm (52.8 in)
- Curb weight: 980–1,075 kg (2,161–2,370 lb)

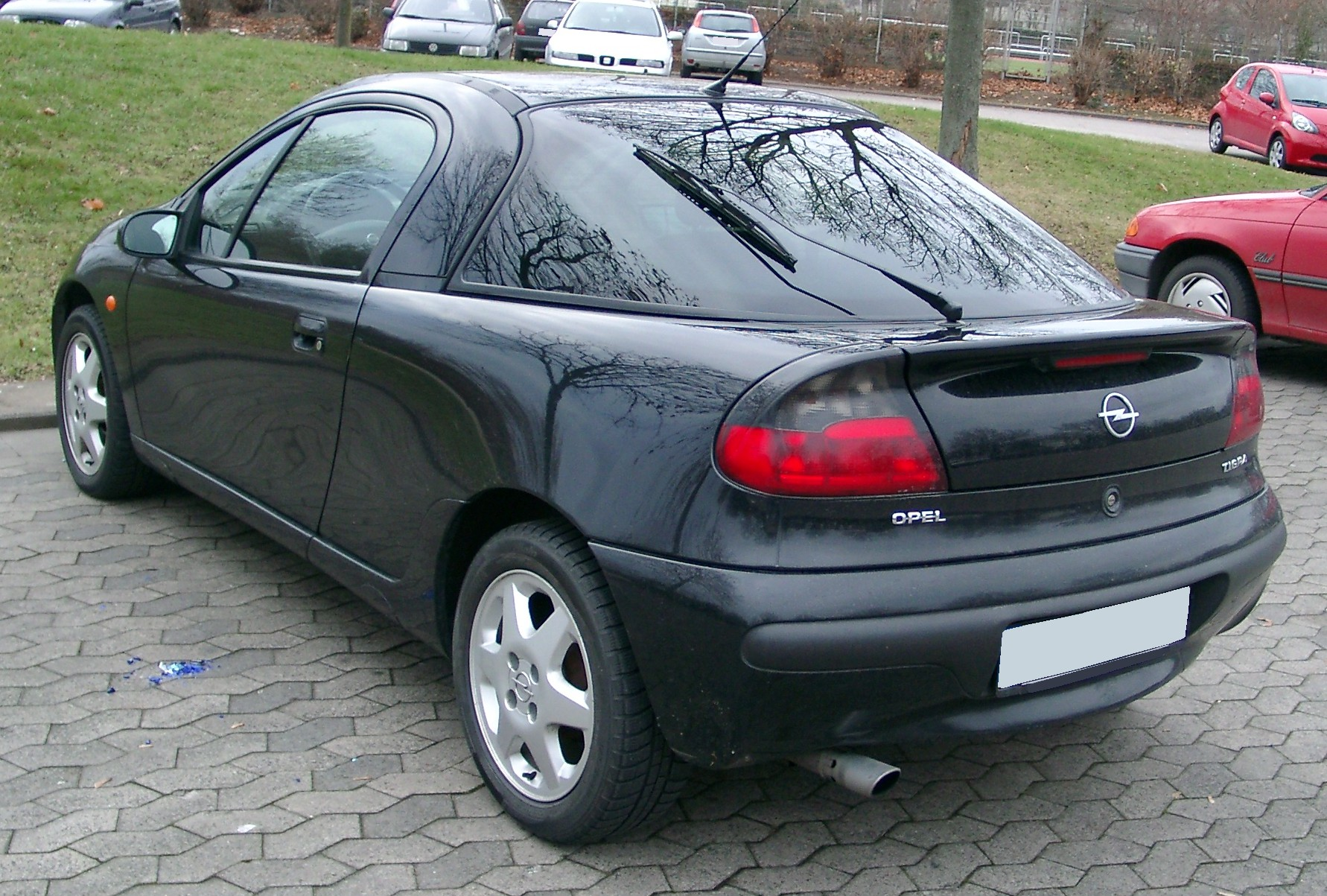
Opel Tigra rear view

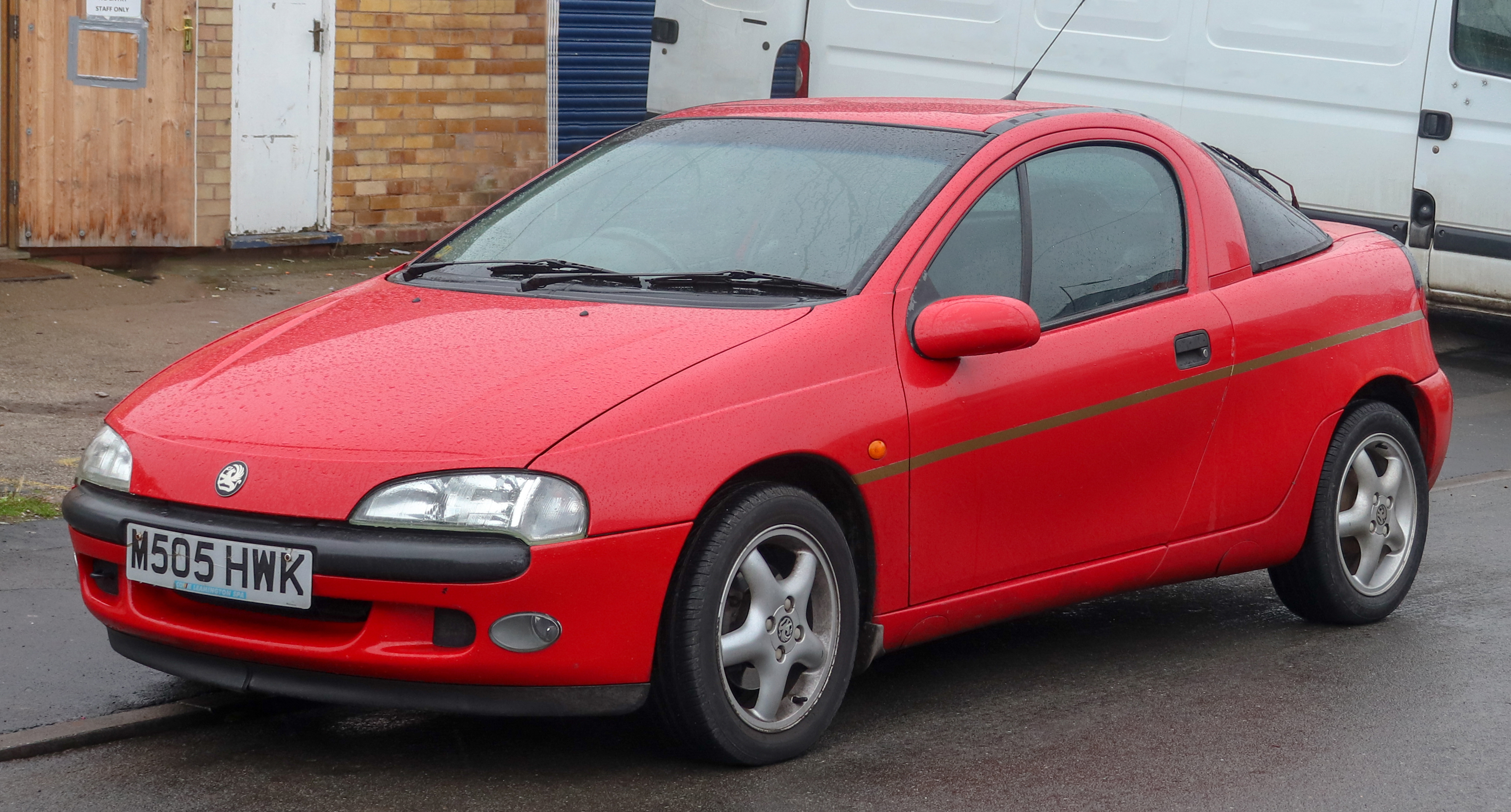
Vauxhall Tigra

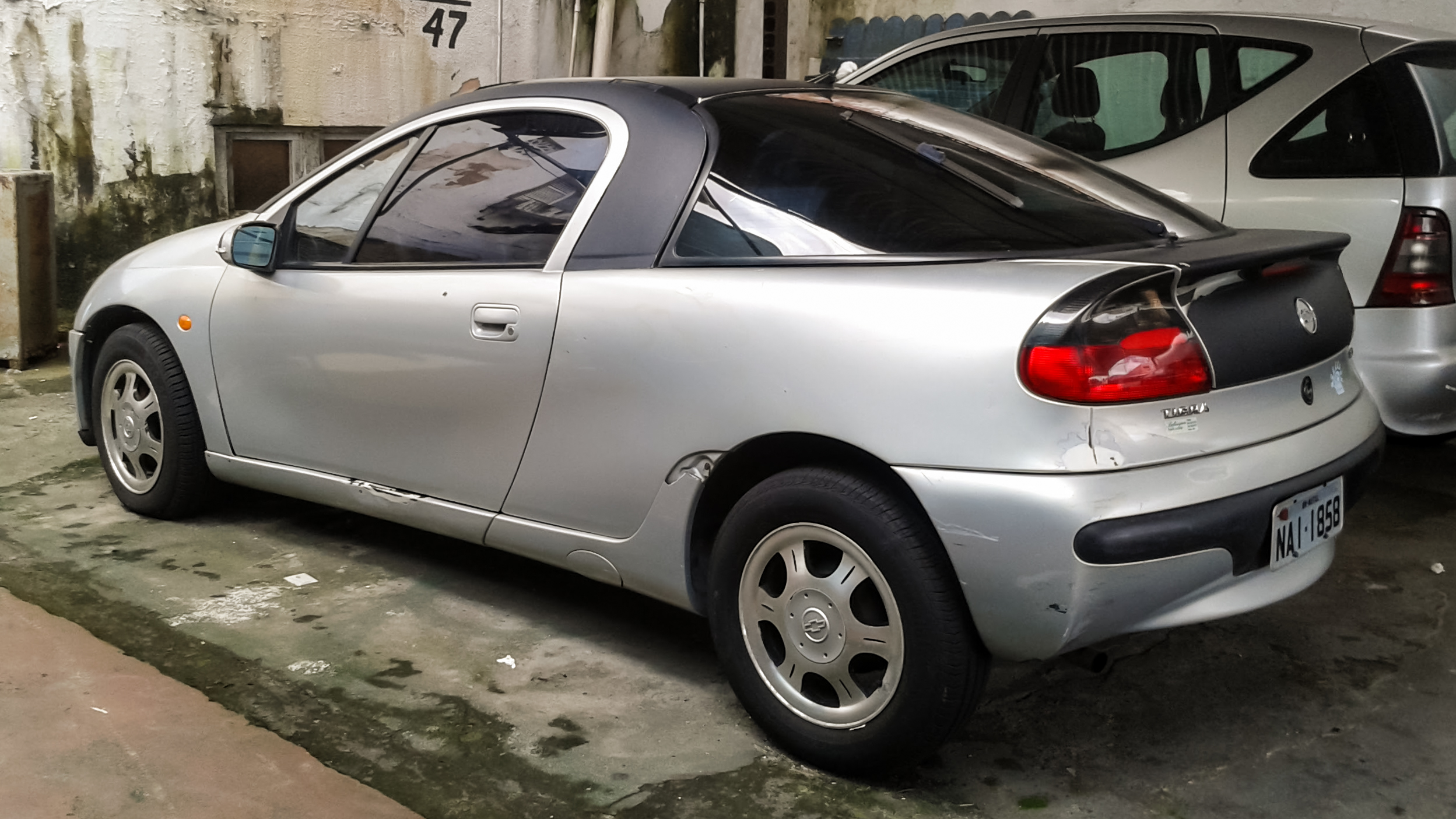
Chevrolet Tigra

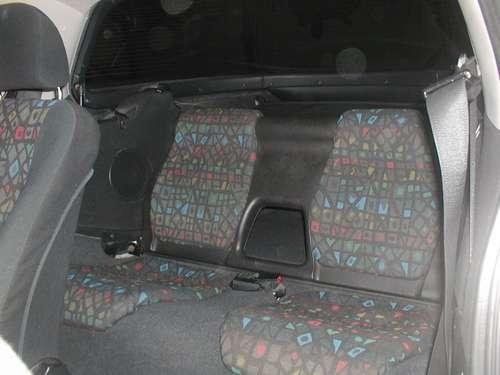
Tigra's different interior design

The first Tigra was based on the coupé concept car of the same name that was shown at the 1993 Frankfurt Motor Show, alongside an open top Tigra Roadster concept and the Scamp off roader/pickup. The première of the concept Tigra in the United Kingdom was in October 1993, at the London Motorfair.

The Tigra was built on the platform of the second generation Opel Corsa. The production vehicle was introduced in the beginning of 1994, and was built at Opel's Zaragoza plant in Spain. Production commenced in September 1994. General Motors' Pontiac division had considered importing the Tigra to the United States, but in the end it was determined that the car was too small for American consumers. Television advertisements in the United Kingdom for the (Vauxhall) Tigra featured the tune "Fiesta" by The Pogues.

The Tigra shared no body panels with the Corsa on which it was based, and the interior layout was different, however still kept the Corsa dashboard and most major engine parts. The Tigra also included a 2+2 seating arrangement. Due to the coupé styling and compact dimensions of the car, rear seat space was limited. The design incorporated a lightning theme as per the Opel logo; this can be seen in the way the roof and waistlines meet the reverse rake of the B-pillar, while lightning-shaped reflection appears in the metal ahead of the rear wheelwell in certain lighting conditions.

The Tigra was available with two petrol engines options, both from the Ecotec family, an entry-level 1.4 L with 90 PS (66 kW), and a larger sportier version, powered by the 1.6 L engine with 106 PS (78 kW), sourced from the Corsa GSi and later Corsa Sports. Both were DOHC 16 valve engines with electronic fuel injection.

The smaller engine was available with an optional four-speed automatic gearbox. The 1.6-litre model came with front fog lights as standard, a feature unavailable on the 1.4-litre version. An automatic option for the 1.4 was added in February 1995.

The suspension was essentially unchanged from the Corsa donor model, although the setup had been tweaked by Lotus. However, the car carried extra weight, with 150 kg (331 lb) over the equivalent engined Corsa models. 0–100 km/h acceleration on the 1.6 L model was 10.5 seconds, one second slower than the Corsa GSi. A higher top speed of 203 km/h (126 mph) was obtained thanks to the higher gear ratios, a lower drag coefficient of 0.31, and standard 15" wheels on the more powerful model.

The car was imported by GM and sold as the Chevrolet Tigra in Brazil and Mexico, and as the Vauxhall Tigra in the United Kingdom. The Chevrolet Tigra was imported to Brazil only for a few months, between the end of 1998 to the beginning of 1999, due to a sudden depreciation of the real, which forced General Motors do Brasil to end importation. Only the 1.6 L model was imported, detuned to 100 PS (74 kW; 99 hp) for tax purposes. The 15" wheels were also exchanged for more affordable 14" wheels.

Production ended in July 2000, with the final sale number worldwide being 256,392. In Germany, from 1994 to 2000, 59,462 models of the car were sold.

== Tigra TwinTop B (2004–2009) ==
Tigra TwinTop B
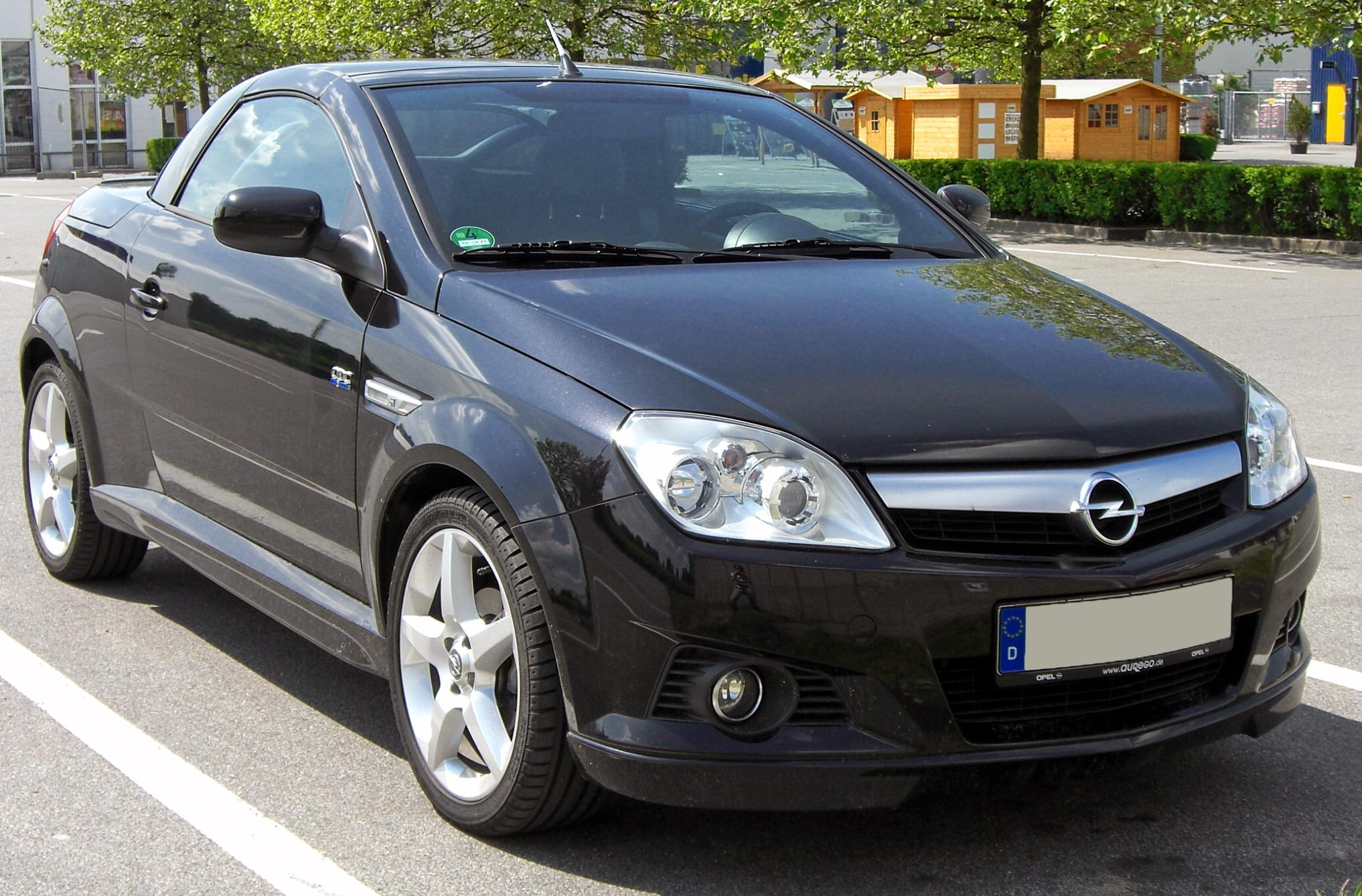

Overview
- Also called: Vauxhall Tigra TwinTop (UK); Holden Tigra (Australia)
- Production: June 2004 – May 2009
- Assembly: France: Cerizay (Heuliez)
- Designer: Niels Loeb

Body and chassis
- Body style: 2-door convertible
- Platform: GM4300
- Related: Opel Combo C Opel Meriva A Opel Corsa C

Powertrain
- Engine: Petrol: 1.4 L Z14XEP I4; 1.8 L Z18XE I4; Diesel: 1.3 L CDTI I4
- Transmission: 5-speed manual 5-speed automated manual

Dimensions
- Wheelbase: 2,491 mm (98.1 in)
- Length: 3,921 mm (154.4 in)
- Width: 1,685 mm (66.3 in)
- Height: 1,364 mm (53.7 in)
- Curb weight: 1,235–1,278 kg (2,723–2,818 lb)

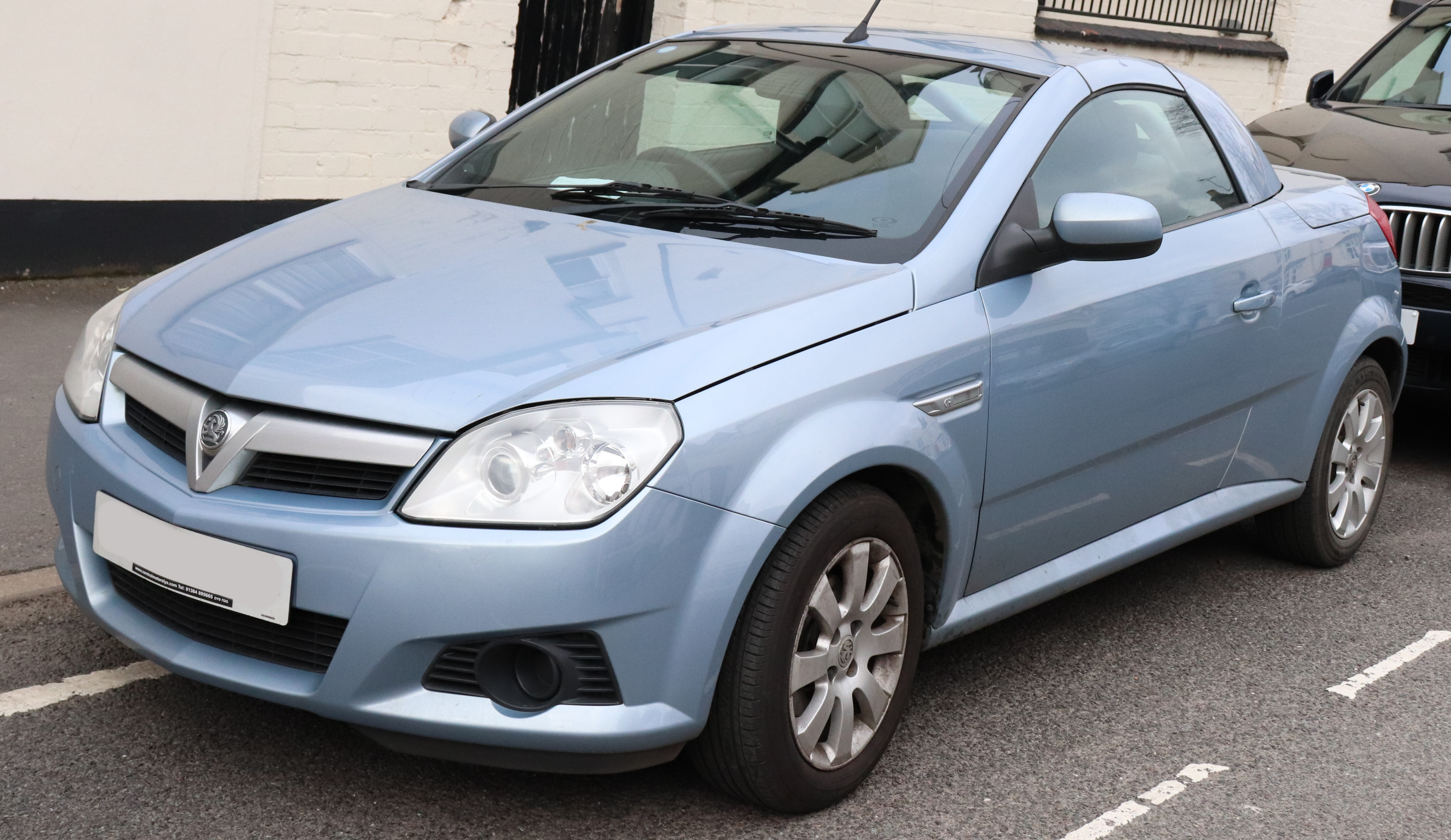
Vauxhall Tigra

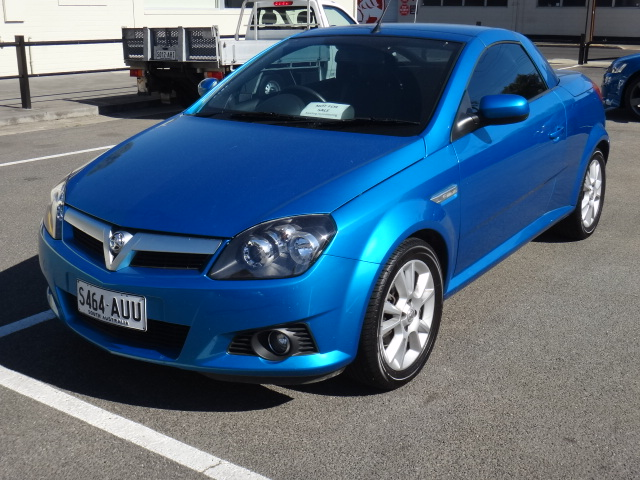
Holden Tigra

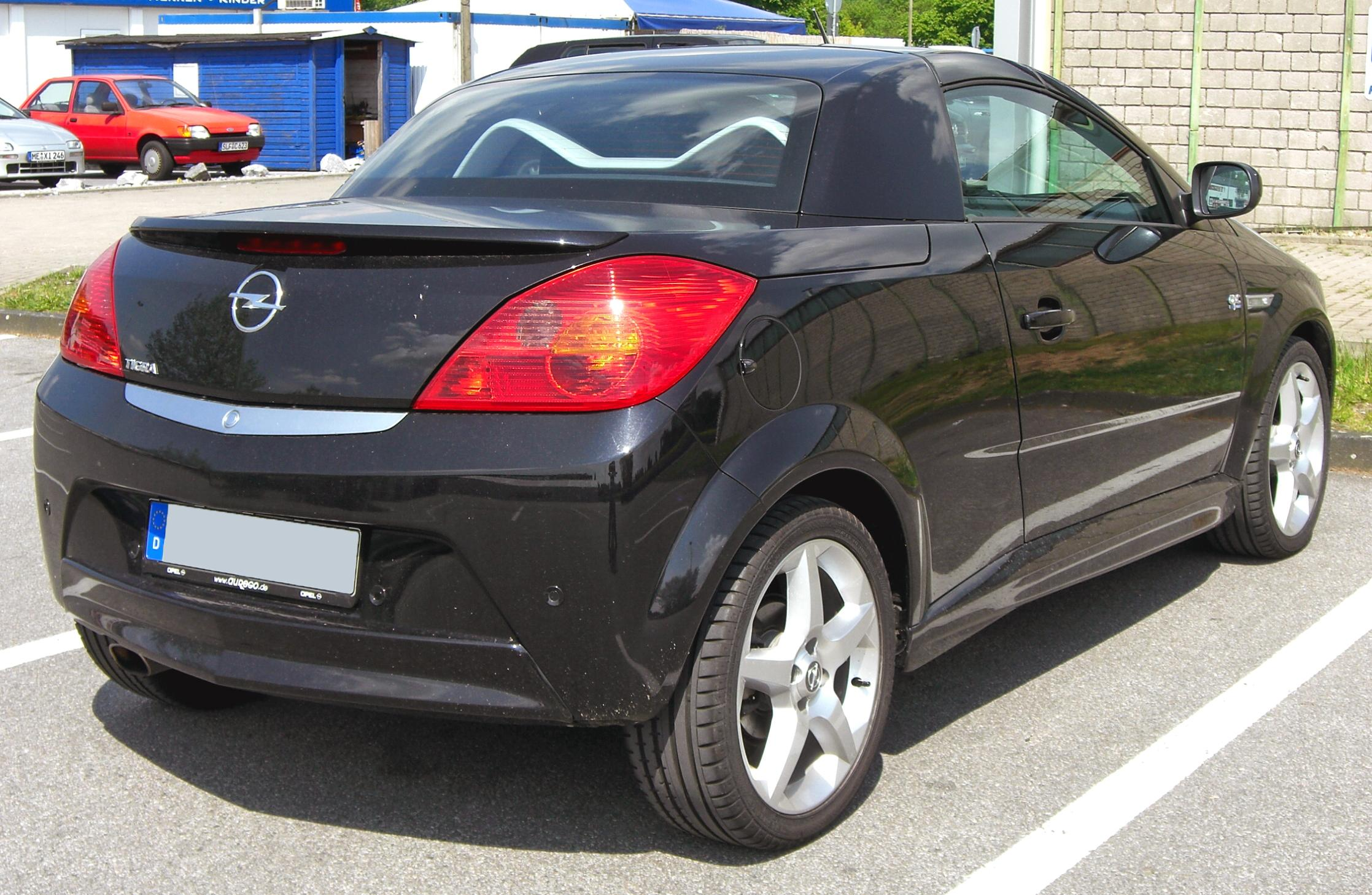
Opel Tigra TwinTop

After an absence of four years, Opel resurrected the nameplate Tigra in June 2004, for a new sports car based on the third generation Opel Corsa. The Tigra TwinTop, as it was called in markets of Opel, was a two-seater coupé convertible with a retractable hardtop, in the fashion of the Peugeot 206 CC.

It was launched at the Geneva Motor Show in March 2004, and was produced by French coachbuilder Heuliez. Sales commenced in October 2004. Like its predecessor, the Tigra TwinTop was available with two petrol powered engines.

The base model used the 1.4 L engine with 90 PS (66 kW), from the Family 0, while the top of the range uses the Ecotec 1.8 L from the Corsa GSi, with 125 PS (92 kW). An economic version, which used Fiat's Multijet 1.3 diesel engine, was introduced in 2005.

The second generation was marketed in Australia as the XC series Holden Tigra, only with the 1.8 L engine. The exterior styling featured Vauxhall's corporate 'V' front grille first seen on the 1994 Vauxhall Omega. Production ended in May 2009, with the final production number being 90,874.

=== Safety ===
Euro NCAP test results LHD, two door roadster (2004)
Test	Score	Rating
Adult occupant:	26	4 /5 stars
Pedestrian:	10	2 /4 stars
