= Heuliez =

French company

- Type: Private
- Founded: 1920
- Founder: Adolphe Heuliez; Louis Heuliez
- Defunct: 2013
- Headquarters: Cerizay, France

Heuliez was a French carrosserie that worked as a production and design unit for various automakers. It specialized in producing short series for niche markets, such as convertibles or station-wagons.

The business activity ended on 31 October 2013. The company's plant and buildings have been taken over by the "Fabrique régionale du Bocage", a quasi-company which has the regional government of Poitou-Charentes as its majority shareholder.

== History ==
In 1922, Louis Heuliez took control of his father, Adolphe Heuliez's, workshop in Cerizay, which, at the time, was in the business of making "English-style" carts. In 1923, Louis created a process for rubberizing wheels, and in 1925, he assembled his first car, a Peugeot 177B. Starting in 1936, Heuliez began production of vehicles with metal bodies under the Robustacier brand. Louis Heuliez passed away in 1947, leaving his son Henri to run the company, while Henri's twin brother, Pierre, ran the design workshop.

From 1948 to 1952, Heuliez saw growth from their manufacture of touring coaches (buses) and large promotional vehicles for advertising. In 1952, the Société Louis Heuliez was founded and the company began to work with Citroën on low volume vehicle production. At the same time, a new division was created for school furniture. 1965 saw the creation of their first factory outside Cerizay, the Henri Heuliez Bressuire Company, manufacturing door frames for the Peugeot 404. In 1968, they began to work with Simca on large scale bodywork production.

In 1969, SA Louis Heuliez was restructured into four divisions, which were renamed in 1972 to the Automotive Studies Division (DEA) (Studies-Prototypes-Testing), the Heuliez Automobiles Division (Stamping and Body Assembly), the Car and Bus Division, and the Series Vehicles Division (Ambulances-Livestock Trucks-Flatbeds). The subsidiary company for the production of buses was later sold in 1980 and trades as Heuliez Bus. In 1972, their bus division began working with Mercedes-Benz. In 1974, Gérard Quéveau succeeded Henri Heuliez as president of the company.

Towards the end, the main product of Heuliez was the retractable roof made for the Peugeot 206 CC, with 350,000 units being produced. It also produced entire cars, such as the Opel Tigra. Since 1985, Heuliez has produced more than 450,000 cars, with a staff of over 2,000.

Poor sales of the Tigra forced Heuliez to reduce its staff by 541 and Opel asked Heuliez to reduce its output from 200 to 50 cars/day until the end of 2006.

In October 2007, Heuliez asked for protection from creditors. In July 2008, Argentum Motors committed itself to invest 10 million Euros in the business, with a further 10 million Euros during the ensuing five years, in return for 60% of the company's capital, but the agreement was not followed through.

The main production plant is located in Cerizay in the Deux-Sèvres département. The president of Heuliez is Paul Quéveau.

In 2010, Heuliez went out of the convertible rooftop-making business, and the electric vehicle elements were acquired by the Franco-German group Baelen Gaillard Industrie-ConEnergy-Kohl and were renamed Mia electric, which itself ceased business in 2014.

== Production ==
- Peugeot 604 Limousine (1978–1984)
- Renault Le Car Van (1979–1983)
- Renault 5 Turbo
- Citroën Visa Chrono (1984)
- Citroën Visa Mille Pistes (1984)
- Citroën Visa Convertible (1984)
- Peugeot 205 Turbo 16 road cars
- Citroën BX Station Wagon (1985–1994)
- Citroën BX 4TC (1986)
- Heuliez VLH 4x4
- Citroën CX Break (1989–1991)
- Citroën XM Break (1992–2000)
- Citroën Xantia Break (1995–2001)
- Peugeot 206 CC (2000–2007)
- Opel Tigra TwinTop (2004–2009)

== Electric vehicles ==
- Heuliez Friendly, later incorporated into Mia Electric
- Heuliez Pondicherry, neighborhood all-electric urban pick-up prototype

== Concept cars and one-offs ==
- Porsche 914/6 Murène (1970)
- Peugeot 204 Taxi H4 (1972)
- Peugeot Safari (1973)
- Citroën GS Buggy (1973)
- Peugeot 504 Loisirs (1979)
- Talbot 1100 VF2 Wind (1980)
- 1981 Renault Alpine GTA styling proposal (1981)
- Renault Fuego Cabriolet concept (1982)
- Heuliez Stars and Stripes (1986)
- Heuliez Atlantic (1986)
- Citroën BX Dyana (1986)
- Citroën AX Van Evasion prototype (1988)
- Citroën BX Break 19 TRD Surélevé prototype (1988)
- Peugeot 309 Break Prototype (1988)
- Peugeot Agades (1989)
- Citroën Scarabee D'Or (1990)
- Citroën Citela (1992)
- Heuliez Raffica (1992)
- Citroën Xanae (1994)
- Citroën ZX Vent d'Ouest (1994)
- Renault Long Cours (1994)
- Citroën Berlingo Bulle (1996)
- Citroën Xantia Break 4x4 Buffalo (1996)
- Heuliez Intruder (1996)
- Heuliez Pregunta (1998)
- Peugeot 607 Paladine (2000)
- Kia KCV-III (2003)
- Peugeot 407 Macarena (2006)
- Dacia Logan MCV Edelweiss (2007)

== Gallery ==
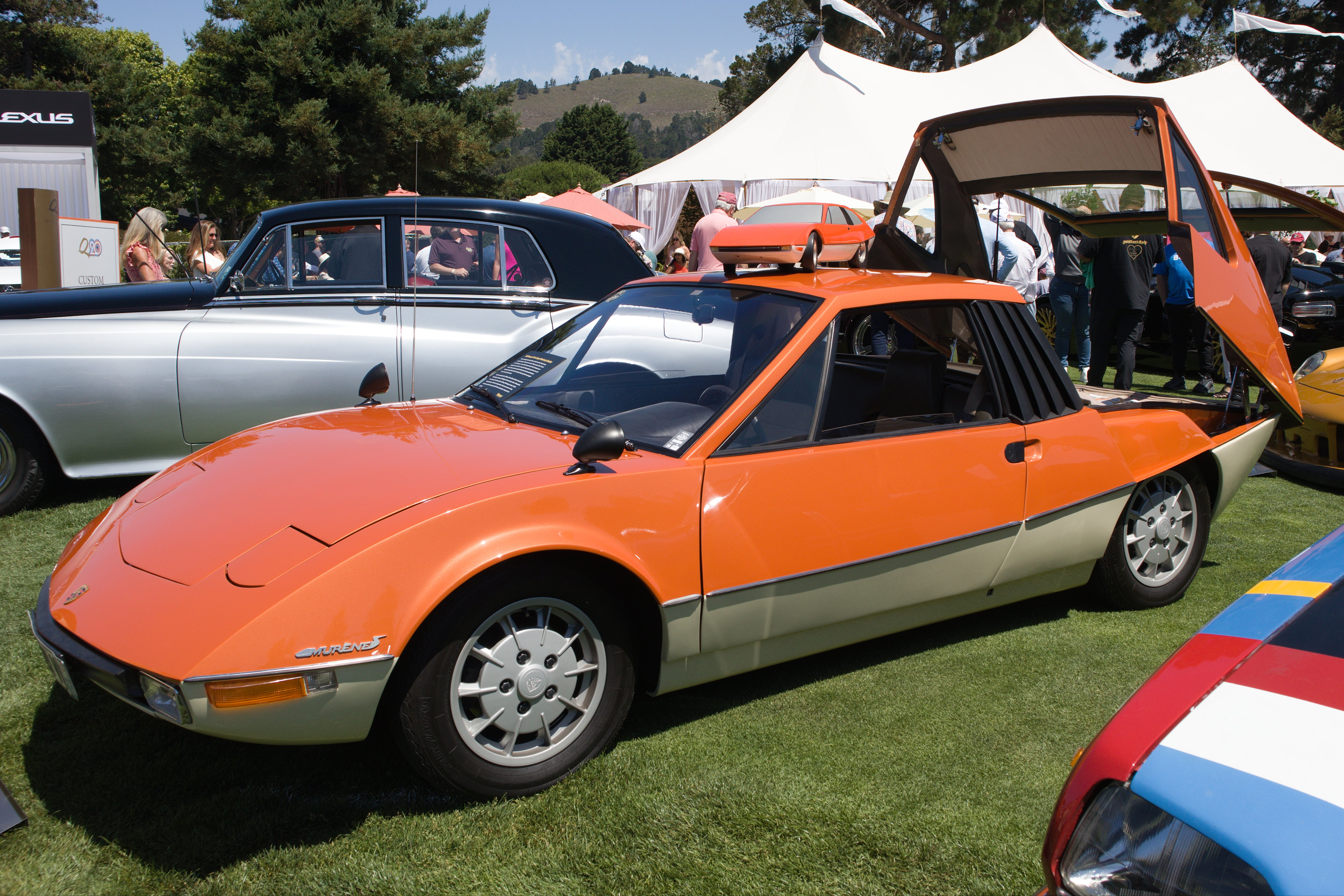
1970 Porsche 914/6 Murène by Heuliez

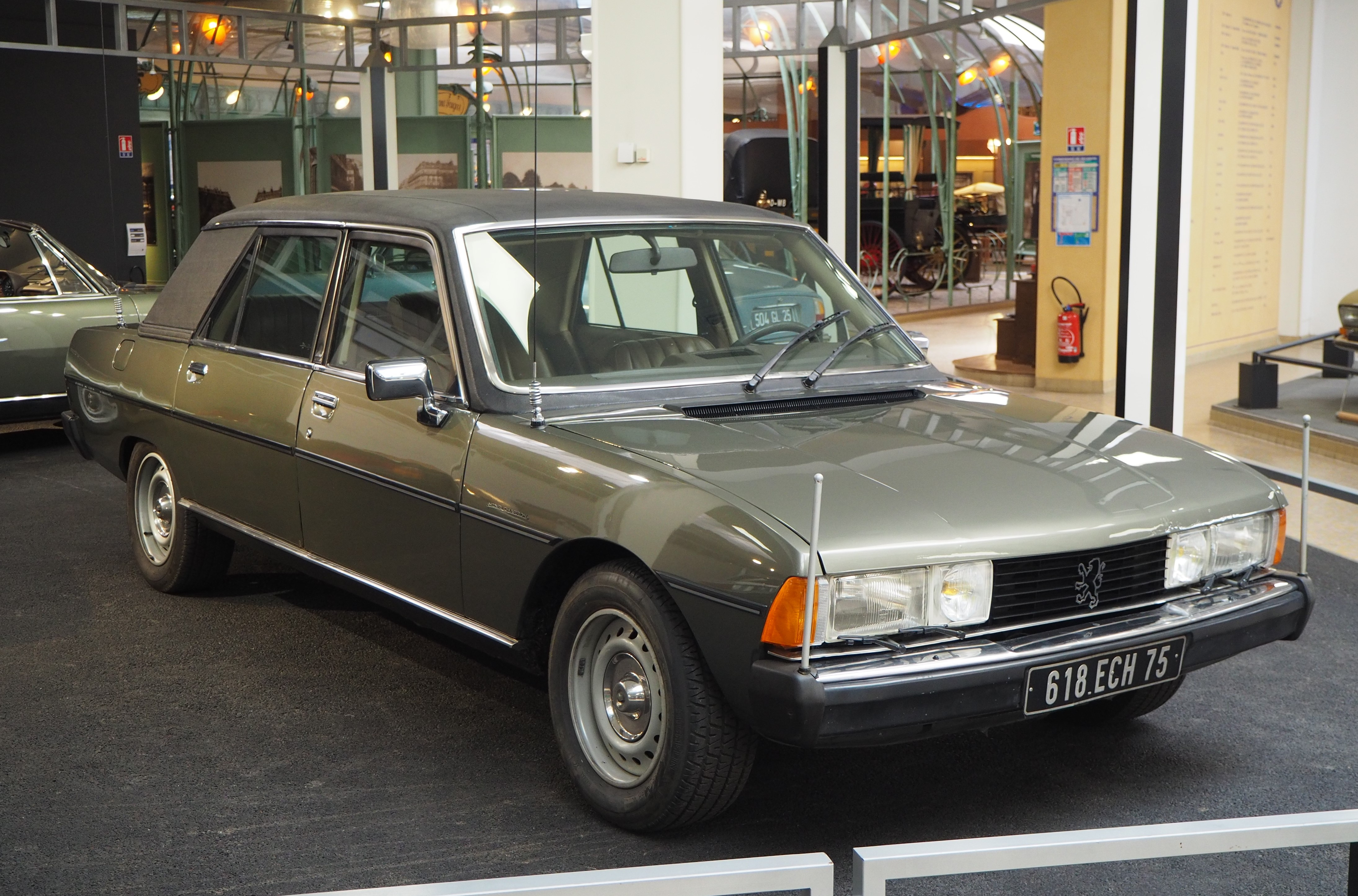
French President Valéry Giscard d'Estaing's Peugeot 604 armoured limousine by Heuliez

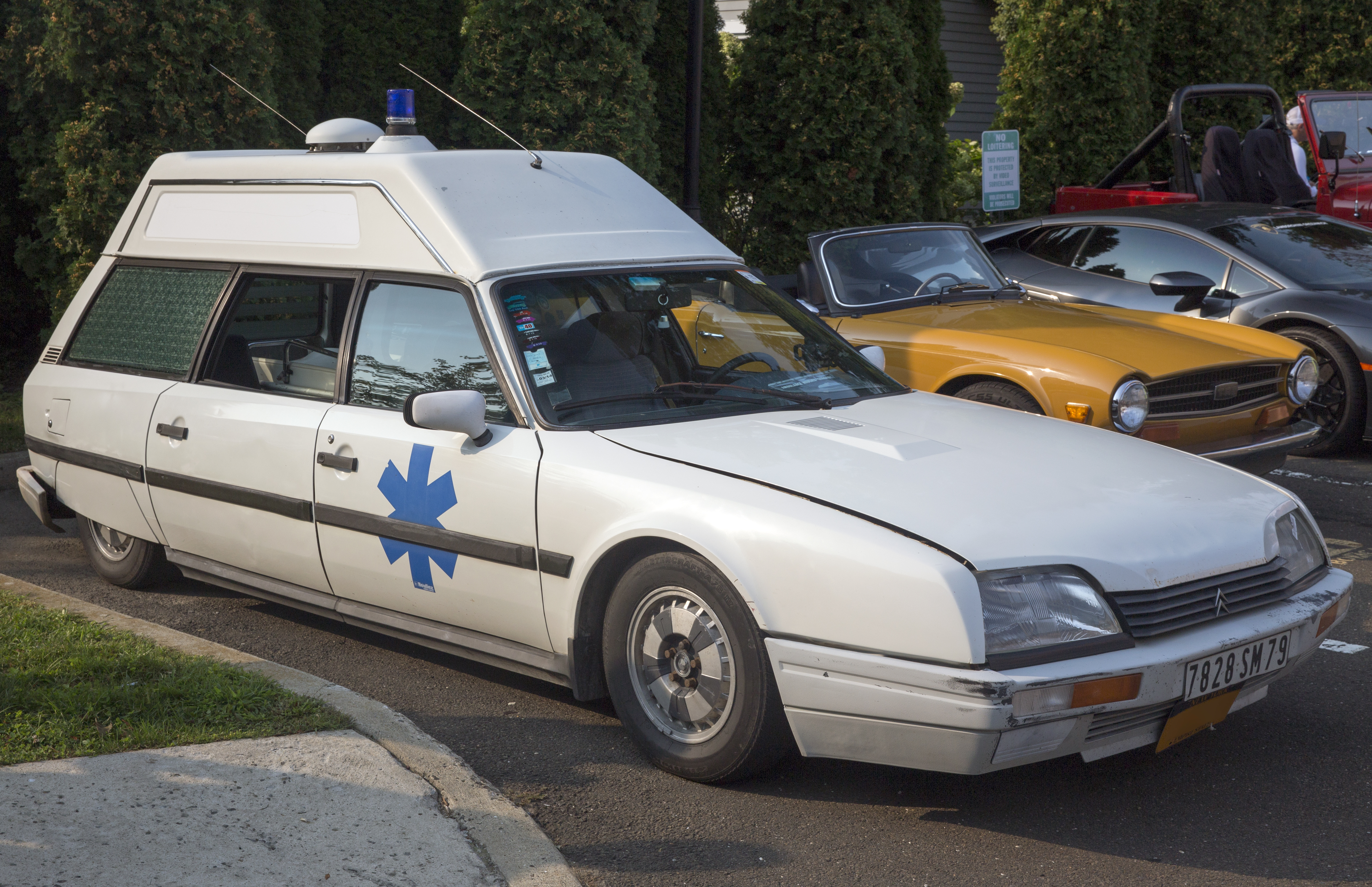
1986 Citroën CX 25RD Heuliez Quasar ambulance

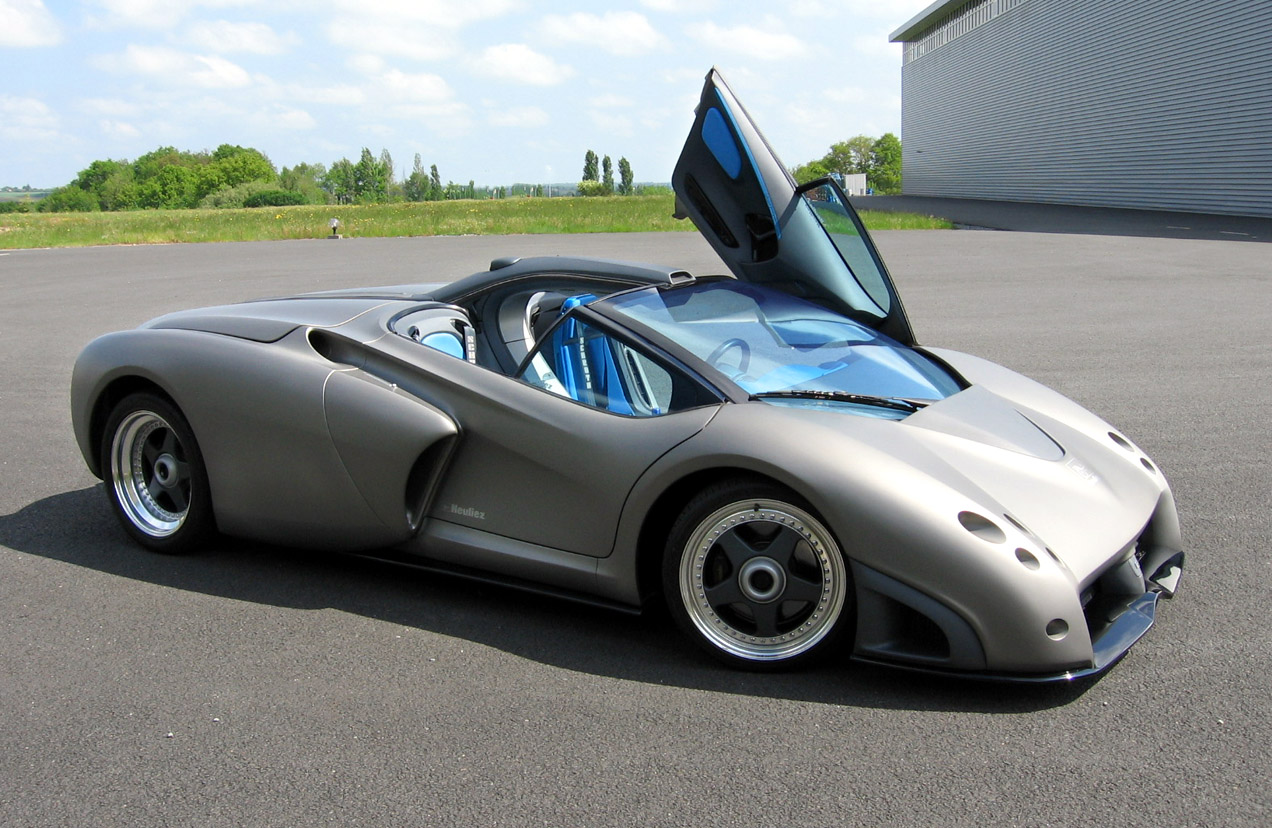
1998 Lamborghini Pregunta concept, designed by Marc Deschamps at Heuliez

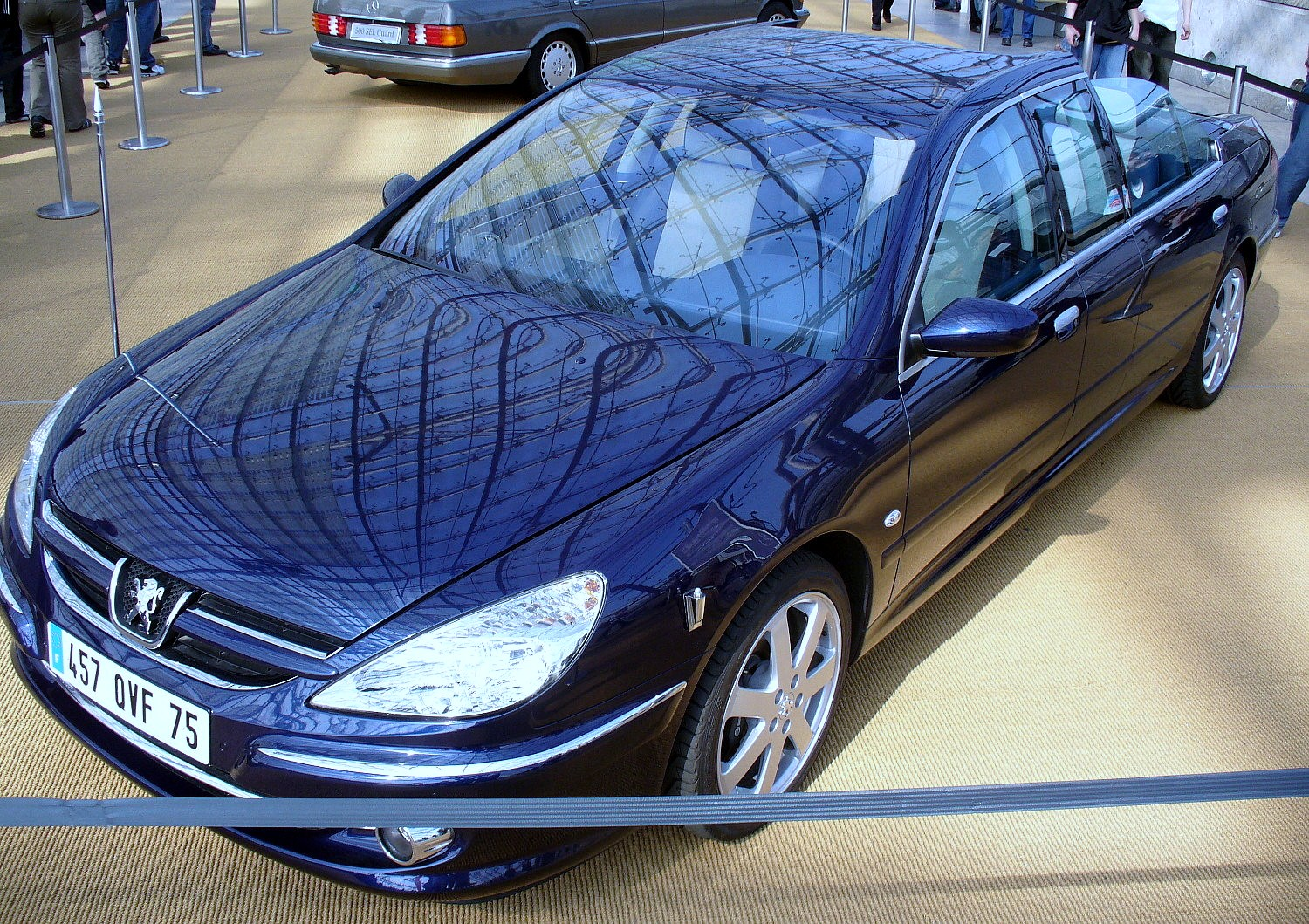
Peugeot 607 Paladine concept by Heuliez, used once by French president Nicolas Sarkozy

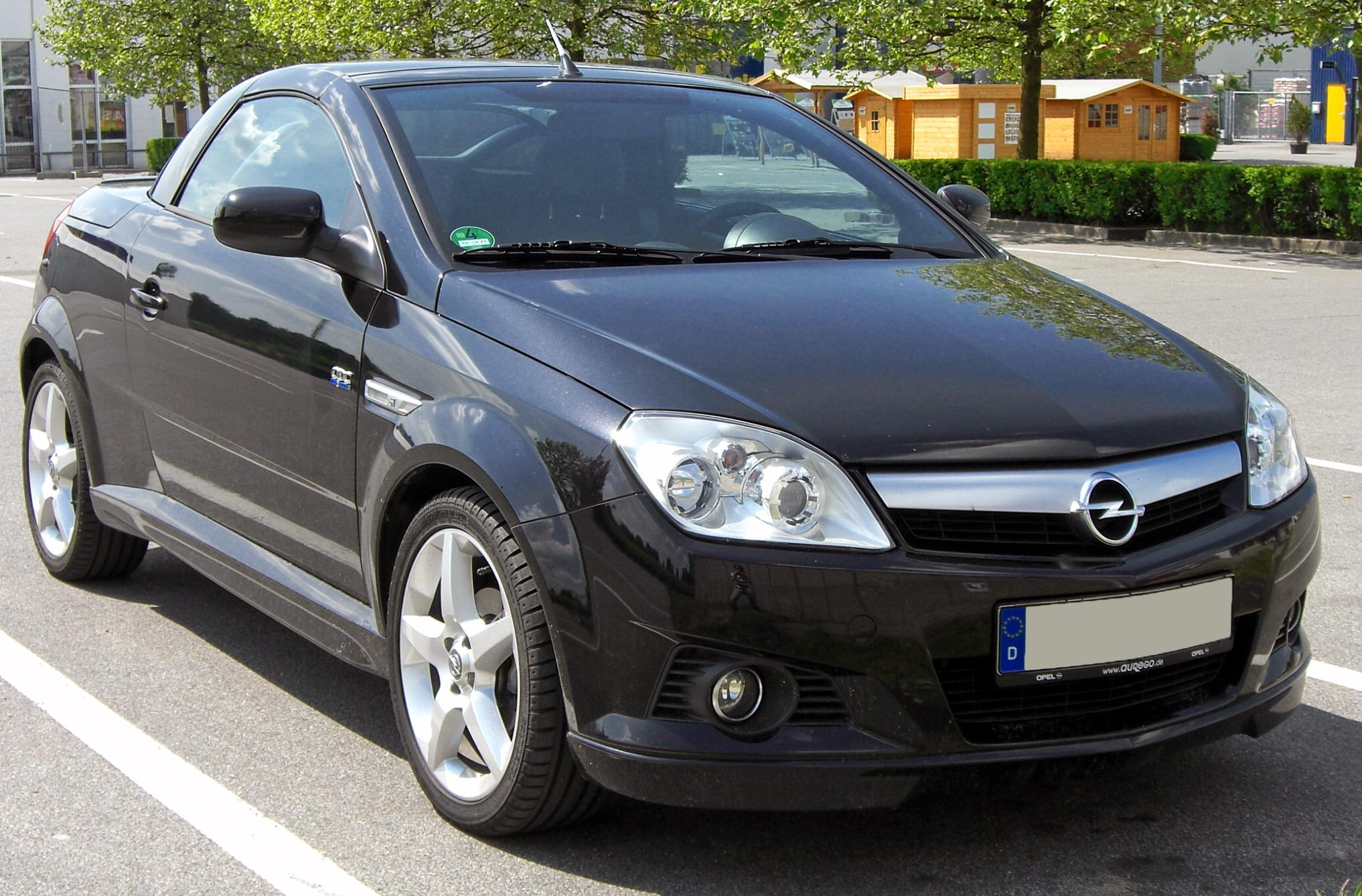
Production of the 2nd generation Opel Tigra was carried out by Heuliez

== See also ==
- Active Wheel as used in the Heuliez WILL concept car
- Henri Chapron also in France
- Karmann in Germany
- Magna Steyr in Austria
- Bertone and Pininfarina in Italy
- Valmet Automotive in Finland
