= Baojun 630 =

Compact car

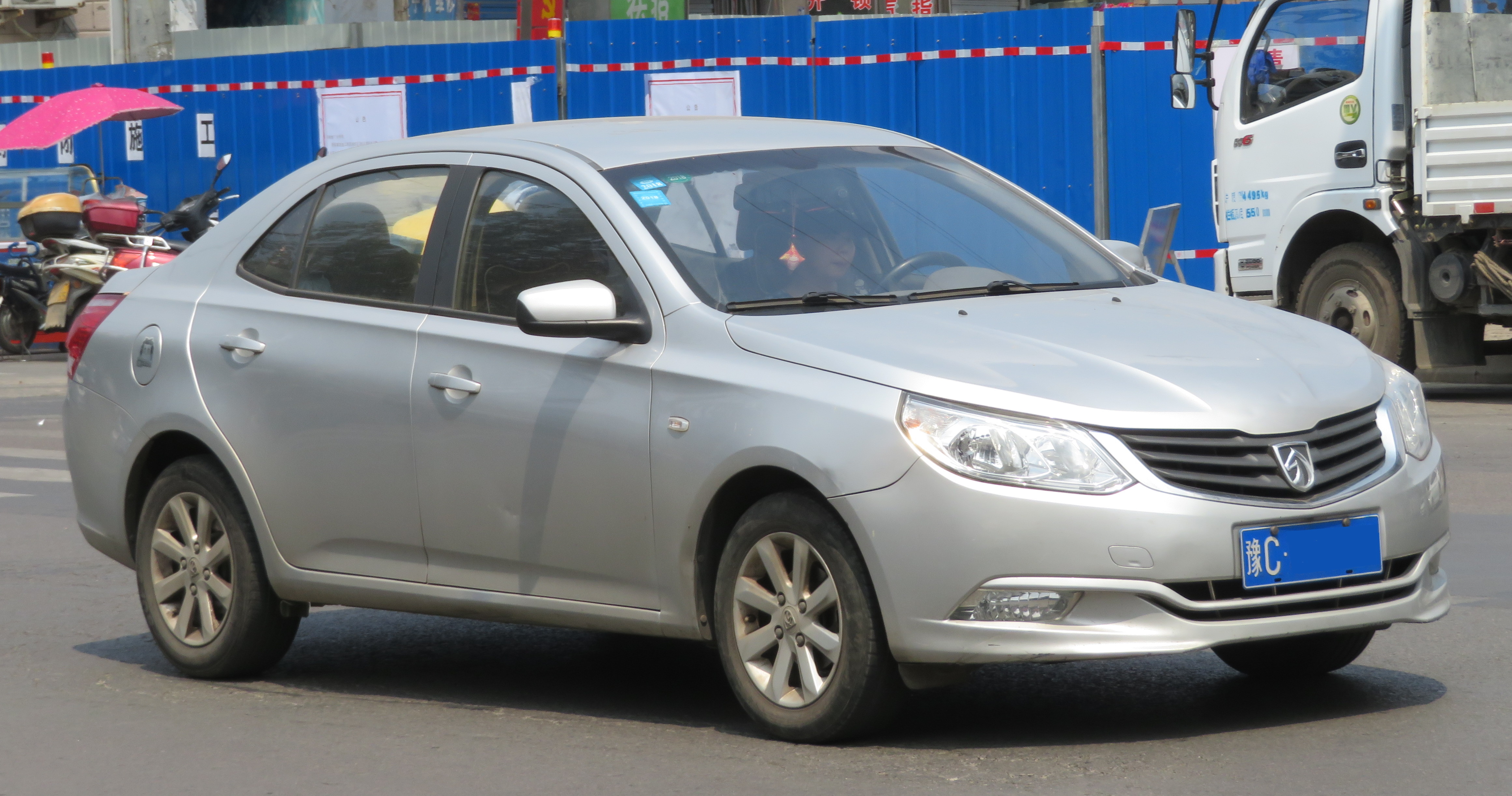
- Baojun 630

Overview
- Manufacturer: SAIC-GM-Wuling
- Also called: Baojun 610 (hatchback); Chevrolet Optra (Egypt, Algeria)
- Production: 2011–2019; 2014–2023 (Arabia, Egypt, Algeria)
- Assembly: China: Liuzhou, Guangxi (SGMW Automobile Co., Ltd.); Egypt: 6 October City (GM Egypt, 2016–2023)

Body and chassis
- Class: Compact car (C)
- Body style: 4-door sedan; 5-door hatchback
- Layout: Front-engine, front-wheel-drive

Powertrain
- Engine: 1.5 L S-TEC III I4; 1.8 L Family 1 I4
- Transmission: 5-speed manual; 6-speed automatic

Dimensions
- Wheelbase: 2,640 mm (103.9 in)
- Length: 4,597 mm (181.0 in); 4,401 mm (173.3 in) (610)
- Width: 1,736 mm (68.3 in)
- Height: 1,462 mm (57.6 in); 1,481 mm (58.3 in) (610)
- Curb weight: 1,206 kg (2,659 lb)

Chronology
- Successor: Baojun RC-5 (China); Chevrolet Optra (310C)

The Baojun 630 is a compact car and was the first car produced by SAIC-GM-Wuling through the Baojun brand. The 630 is manufactured in Liuzhou, Guangxi, China. It was launched at the 2011 Shanghai Auto Show, and went on sale in August 2011. A five-door hatchback derivative called the 610 was added to the range in April 2014.

== Overview ==
The car was developed at the SAIC-GM Pan Asia Technical Automotive Center (PATAC) in Shanghai. While not visually similar to other GM cars, it has been suggested that the 630 and 610 is based on the Buick Excelle/Daewoo Lacetti platform.

In 2014, the car debuted in Egypt and Algeria as the Chevrolet Optra. The 2023 model was the final Optra to be listed on the Chevrolet Arabia website.

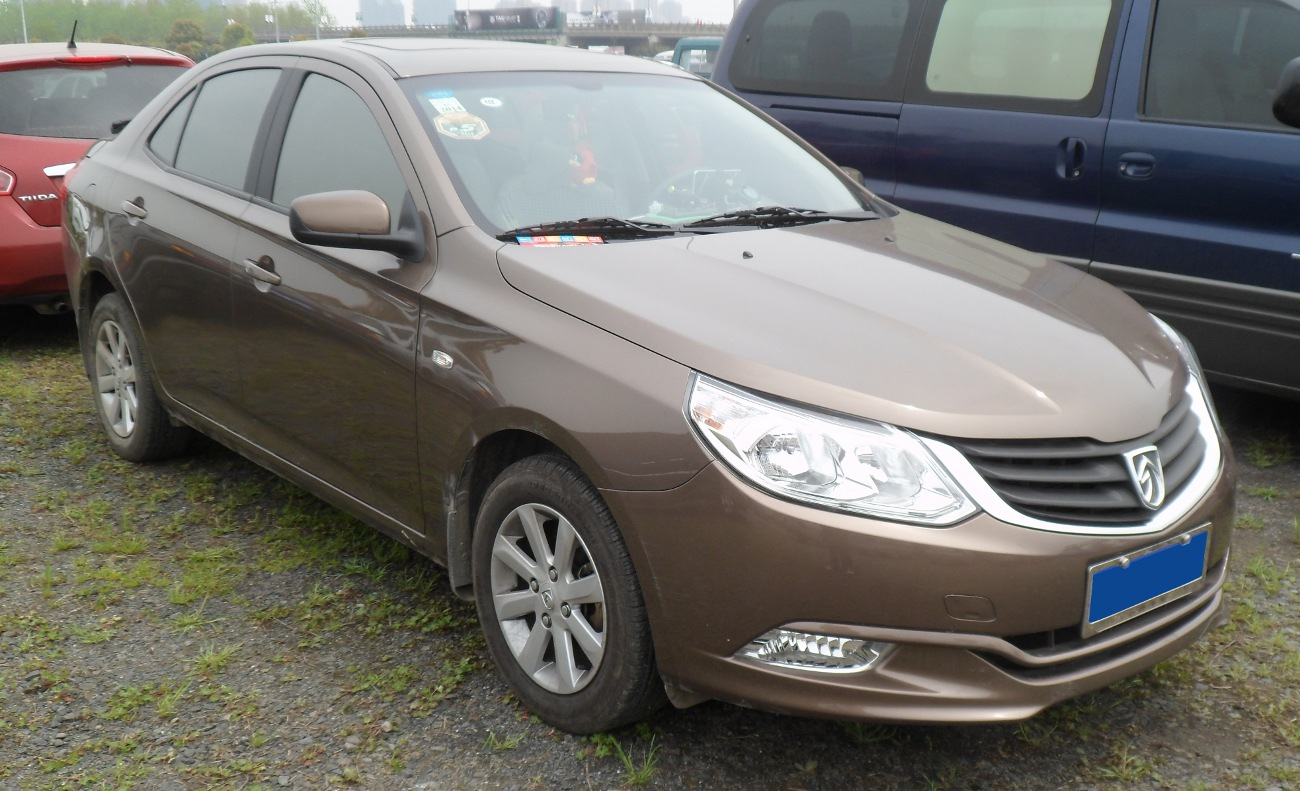
Baojun 630 pre-facelift front

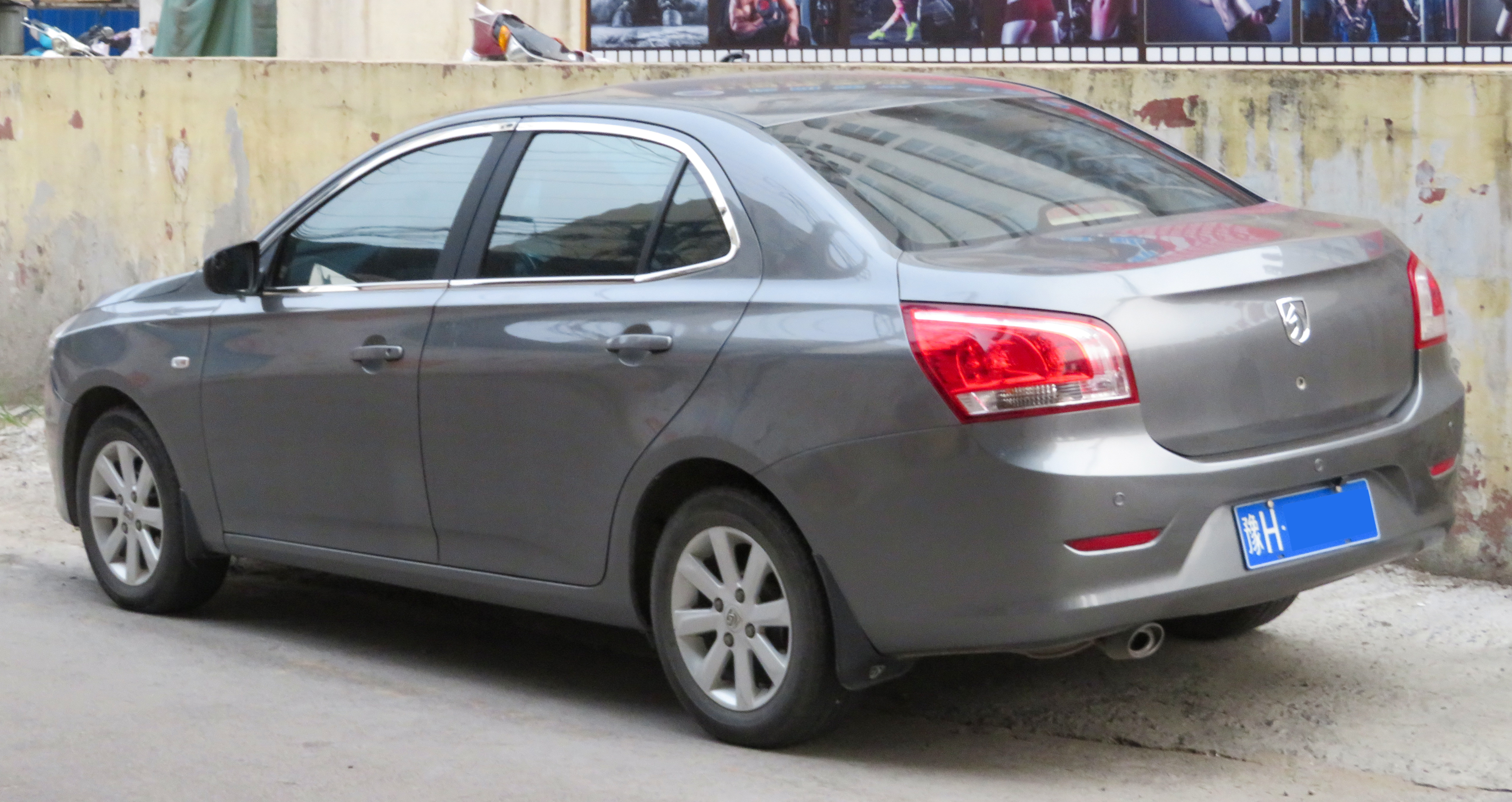
Baojun 630 pre-facelift rear

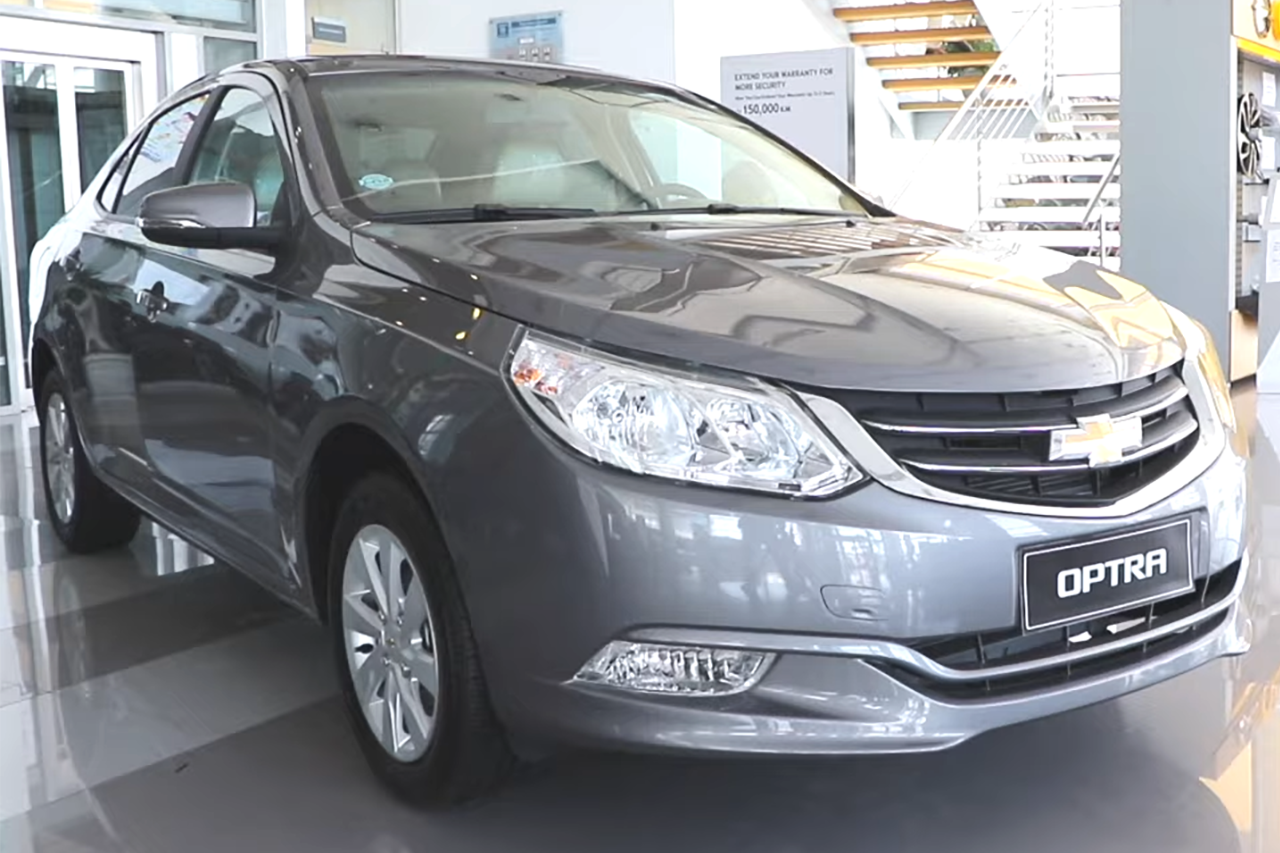
2021 Chevrolet Optra (Egypt)

=== Facelift (MY2016) ===
A facelifted version was revealed for the first time in December 2015, featuring a slightly revised front end, a more important redesigned rear end, with larger tail lamps, and a heavily reworked dashboard.

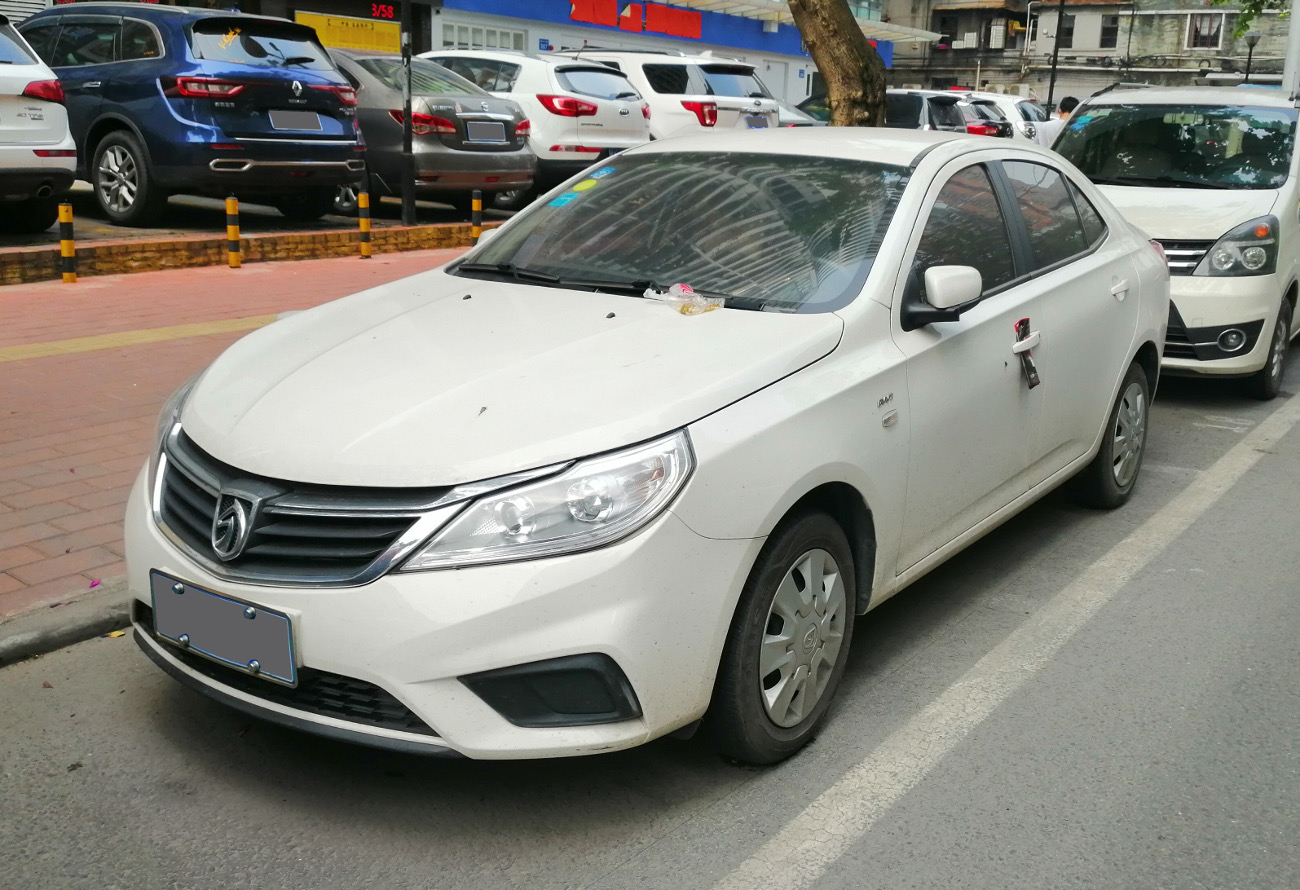
Baojun 630 facelift

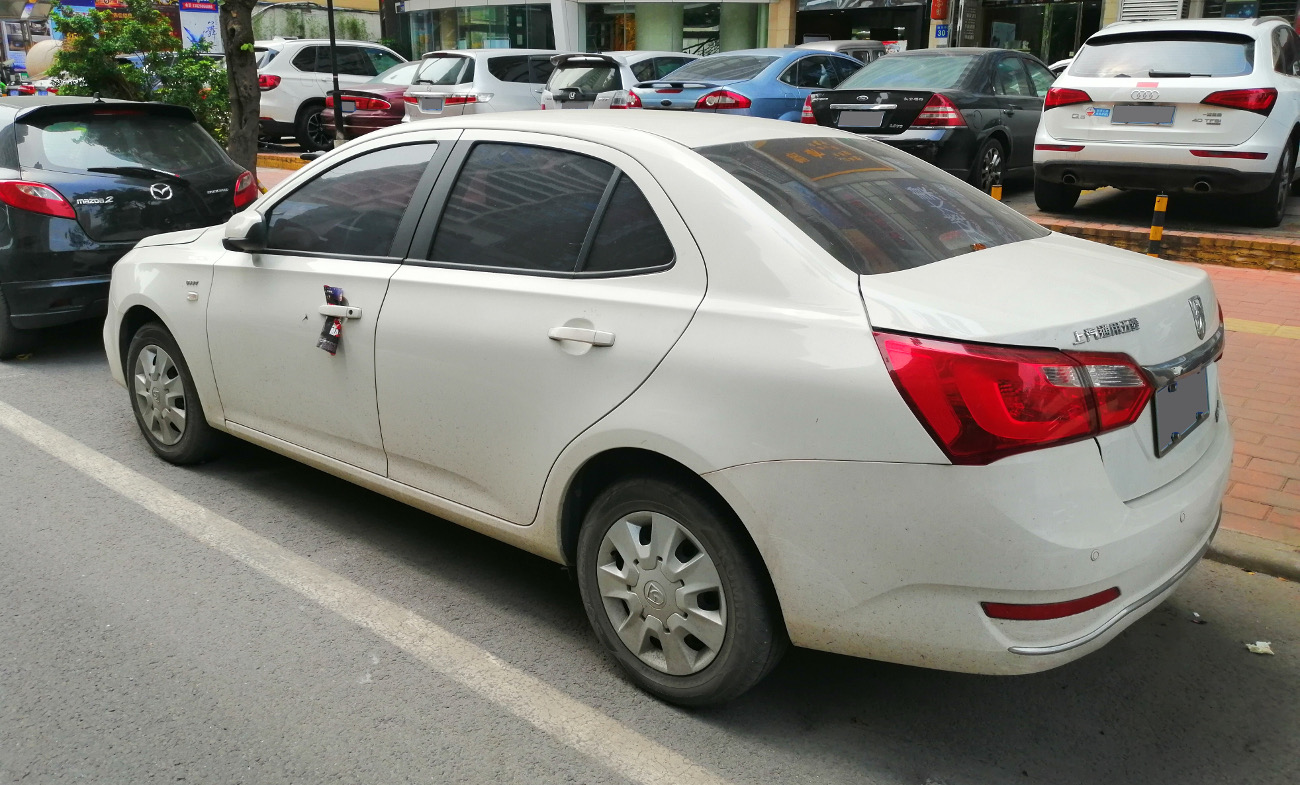
Baojun 630 facelift rear

=== 610 ===
The hatchback variant of the 630 is known as the 610.

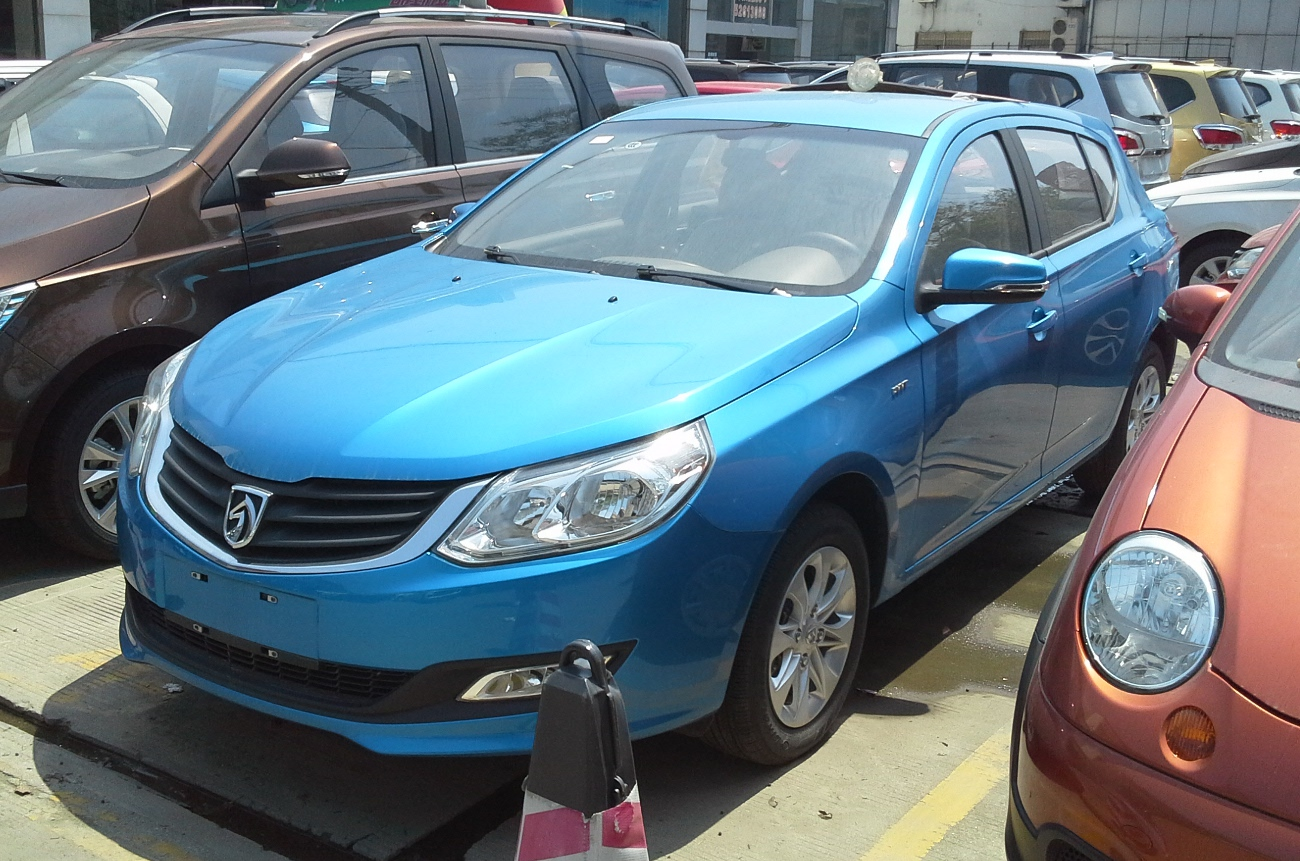
Baojun 610 pre-facelift front

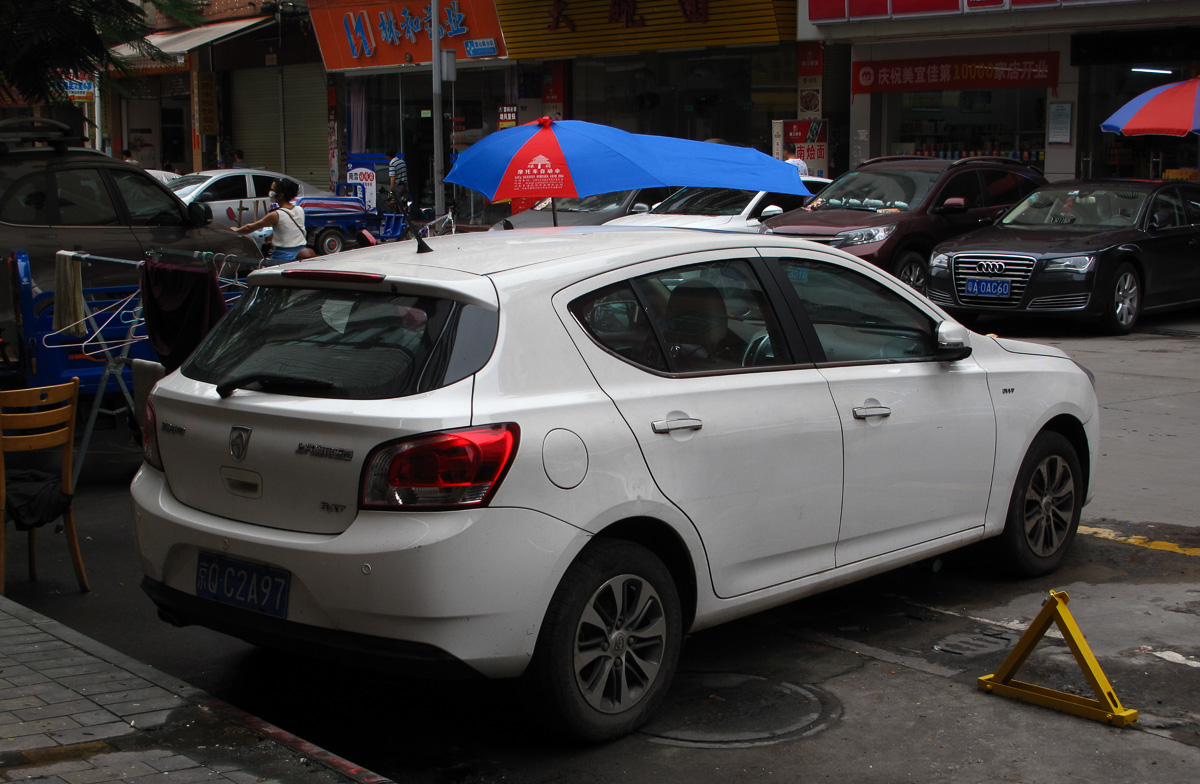
Baojun 610 pre-facelift rear

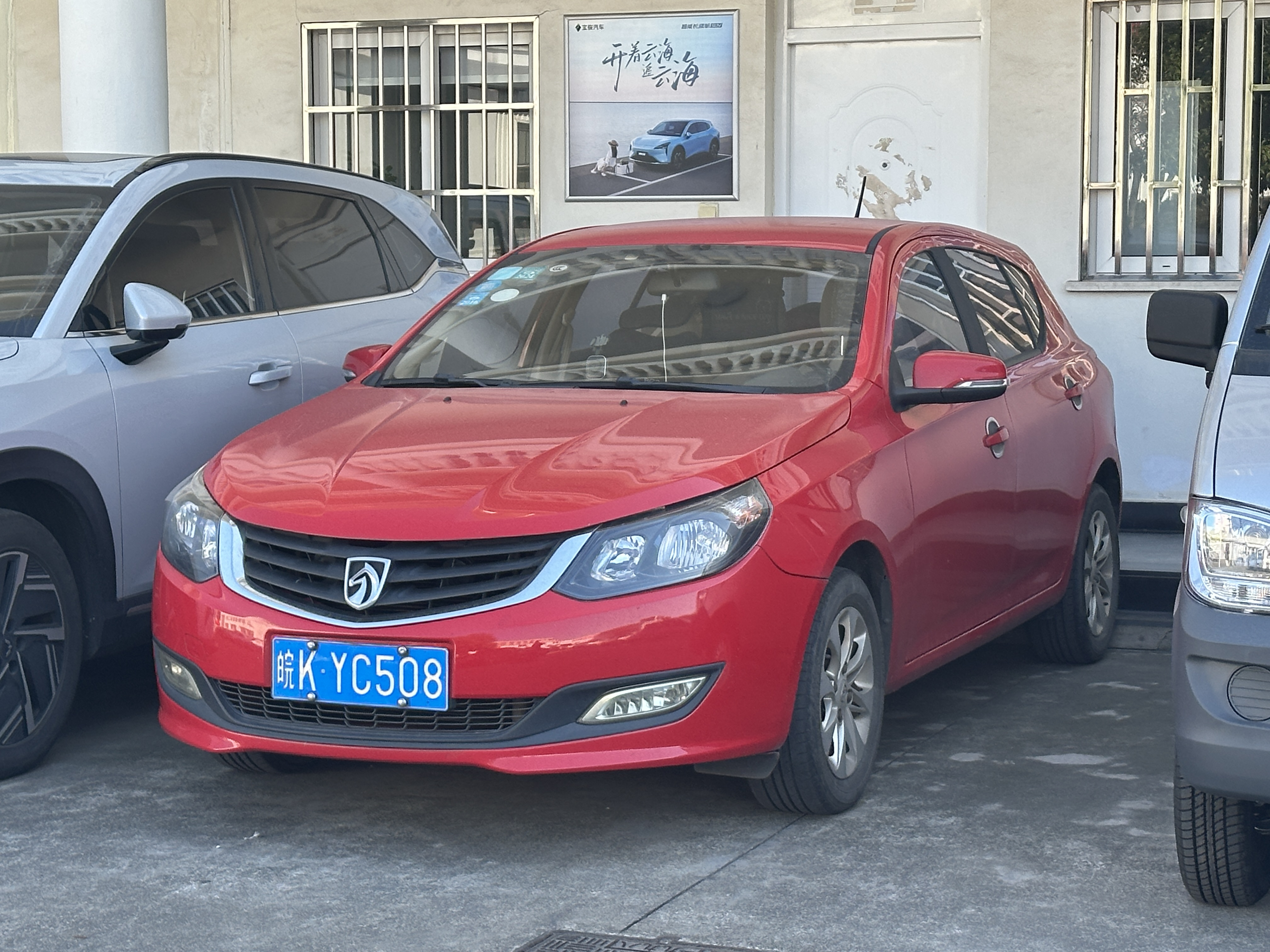
Baojun 610 Cross

== Specification ==
The 630 is powered by a 1.5-litre 4-cylinder 109 bhp (81 kW; 111 PS) 1.5-litre (1,485 cc) engine producing 146 N⋅m (108 lb⋅ft) and mated to a five-speed transmission. A 1.8-litre (1,796 cc) version, producing 141 bhp (105 kW; 143 PS) and 177 N⋅m (131 lb⋅ft) was added to the range in November 2012.

It can be equipped with front airbags, ABS with EBD, leather seats, power windows, remote central locking, air conditioning, trip computer, a CD player and rear parking sensors. The Baojun 630 is currently using pull-out door handles, similar to the facelifted Daewoo Lacetti.
