= Heuliez Raffica =

Concept car by Heuliez

Overview
- Production: 1992
- Designer: Marc Deschamps

Body and chassis
- Class: Concept car
- Body style: 2-door convertible

Dimensions
- Wheelbase: 2,500 mm (98.4 in)
- Length: 4,200 mm (165.4 in)
- Width: 1,900 mm (74.8 in)
- Height: 1,240 mm (48.8 in)

The Heuliez Raffica (Raffica means "flurry" in Italian) is a two-seater convertible with an electrically operated retractable hardtop that was unveiled at the 1992 Paris Motor Show.

== Overview ==
The Raffica was designed by Marc Deschamps with aerodynamics in mind, and was built by Stola. It was reportedly designed and built in two to four months.

The Raffica features an electrically operated roof mechanism with three positions, patented by Heuliez, allowing the car to be used as a spider, targa or coupe. It also features seating for three, with the third seat in the middle, behind the front seats, as well as retractable headlamps. The car was reportedly intended to be front-wheel drive, though later reports say the show model had no mechanical components or steering.

A second version was built after the original, painted in blue instead of orange. This version reportedly featured four seats instead of three, as well as minor styling changes. It's unclear whether this was a modified version of the original Raffica model, or a newly built model. The second version of the Raffica came up for auction in July 2012 and sold for €3,574.
