= General Motors GMT platform =

Automobile platform

GMT (General Motors Truck) is a nomenclature used by General Motors to designate multiple vehicle platforms. In use since the early 1980s, the GMT nomenclature is used for light trucks, full-size SUVs, and vans, along with several medium-duty trucks. With only a few exceptions, nearly all GMT vehicles use body-on-frame construction, along with rear-wheel drive (or all-wheel drive) powertrain configurations.

== Primary applications ==
Primary applications of the platform – those that are equivalent in basic RWD/frame structure to each other – existed from 1981 to 1989, and again since 2018.

=== Light trucks and SUVs ===
Pickups and SUVs have been the main vehicles underpinned by GMT platforms, being involved for the entirety of the platform's existence.

==== Fullsize ====
1. GMT400 – Chevrolet C/K and variants, 1988 – 2002
2. GMT800 – Chevrolet Silverado and variants, 1999 – 2007
3. GMT900 – Chevrolet Silverado and variants, 2007 – 2014
4. GMTK2XX – Chevrolet Silverado and variants, 2014 – 2019
5. GMTT1XX – Chevrolet Silverado and variants, 2019–present

==== Midsize ====
1. GMT325 – Chevrolet S-10 and truck rebadgings, 1982 – 2012
2. GMT330 – Chevrolet S-10 Blazer and SUV rebadgings, 1983 – 2012
3. GMT355 – First-gen. Chevrolet Colorado and truck rebadgings, 2004 – 2012
4. GMT360 – Chevrolet TrailBlazer and rebadgings, 2002 – 2009
5. GMT700, later GMT31XX – Second-gen. Chevrolet Colorado, 2012–present
6. GMT700, later GMT31XX – Second-gen. Chevrolet TrailBlazer SUV, 2012–present

=== Hummer ===
In contrast to the Hummer H1–designed and assembled by AM General, the Hummer H2 and Hummer H3 were developed by GM, receiving their own platform designations. Designated the GMT825, the H2 was derived from the GMT820 (Chevrolet Tahoe/GMC Yukon), with its own midsection frame design and a rear frame shared with the 2500-series GMT800 pickup trucks.

The H3 SUV was designated the GMT345, a close variant of the GMT355 (Chevrolet Colorado/GMC Canyon). The 2009-2010 H3T pickup truck was designated as the GMT745, adopting a nomenclature closer in line with the GMT700 used by the later second-generation Colorado/Canyon.

=== Vans ===
The 1996 Chevrolet Express/GMC Savana replaced the previous G-series Van/Vandura, adopting the GMT600 designation. As part of a model update and revision for 2003, GM changed the Express/Savana to GMT610, which remains in use. The model line competes with the Ford Transit, and Ford E-Series (dependent on configuration), Mercedes-Benz/Freightliner Sprinter, Dodge Ram Wagon, and the Ram ProMaster (cargo van only).

=== Medium trucks ===
For 1990, the Chevrolet Kodiak/GMC TopKick medium-duty trucks adopted the GMT530 designation (sharing the cab of the GMT400 trucks). For 2003, the line was redesigned, becoming the GMT560 platform (sharing a version of the GMT610 cab). After the 2009 model year, General Motors ended medium-duty truck production.

Since 2018, a medium-duty version of the GMTK2XX has been produced in a joint venture with Navistar International.

== Other applications ==
While the aforementioned platforms are the ones model commonly referred to as GMT platforms, there have been other instances of the name being applied which are not for RWD and/or body-on-frame vehicles.

=== MPVs ===
For 1990, GM unveiled its first minivans, all of which were underpinned by the first generation of the U platform. This platform was given the alternate name of GMT199 shortly thereafter, beginning the pattern of expanded use for the GMT platform name. This pattern was kept for the 1996 second-generation and 2005 third-generation GM minivans, called the GMT200 and GMT201 platforms, respectively. With the 2010 introduction of the fourth-generation U platform, the designation GMT510 was planned for use. However, all of the GM minivans (save for the China-exclusive Buick GL8) were dropped, ergo the name went unused.

For its production from 2006 to 2011, the compact wagon-bodied Chevrolet HHR rode on the Delta platform. Despite this, it was internally given the designation of GMT001.

=== Crossovers ===
In 2001 and 2002, the Pontiac Aztek and Buick Rendezvous were introduced, respectively. These were built upon a shortened version of the U platform which underpinned GM's minivans. As such, they were given the GMT 250 and GMT 257 names respectively. For 2003, Cadillac released their first crossover, the Sigma-based first-generation SRX. Being a luxury model, it was given the alternate platform code of GMT265. The successive generation SRX, on an entirely different platform, was called GMT166. The related Saab 9-4X was called GMT168.

In 2004, with the release of the first-generation Chevrolet Equinox, the GMT 191 name was internally used to refer to it. Consequently, the GMT190 name was retroactively applied to the second-generation Chevrolet Tracker, which could be considered one of the Equinox's predecessors. GMT192 was used to refer to the Pontiac Torrent, which was released a year later. The next application of this platform was called GMT193, used exclusively for the second-generation Suzuki XL7, which was discontinued in 2009. The 2010 second-generation Chevrolet Equinox, was called GMT172. The related GMC Terrain was called GMT177. In 2017, the third-generation Equinox went on sale, though it did not use an alternate GMT designation for its platform, and simply used the latest Delta platform variant D2XX. This decision, along with the equivalent shifts for the Enclave and Traverse models in the same year, made for the end of the use of GMT-platform designations for models that are not RWD and body-on-frame.

For 2007, the release of the new Saturn Outlook and GMC Acadia, as well as the Lambda platform, occurred. Lambda itself was called the GMT960 series, with each individual vehicle it underpinned getting an alternate GMT-designation as well. The Outlook was given GMT966, and the Acadia GMT968. The next year, the Buick Enclave and Chevrolet Traverse were introduced, and given GMT967 and GMT561, respectively. Despite numerical similarity in nomenclature of these platforms to the GMT900/GMT560 platforms, there was no further relation, as these models were actually more similar to the other GM crossover platforms.

GM GMT platform application timeline
				1980s									1990s										2000s										2010s										2020s					
				1	2	3	4	5	6	7	8	9	0	1	2	3	4	5	6	7	8	9	0	1	2	3	4	5	6	7	8	9	0	1	2	3	4	5	6	7	8	9	0	1	2	3	4	5
truck	medium-duty												530													560																						
truck	medium-duty													455																																		
truck	light-duty	fullsize	SUT																						805/806					941/946																		
truck	light-duty	fullsize	pickup								400/480											800/880								900/910							K2XX					T1XX						
truck	light-duty	roadster pickup																								368																						
truck	light-duty	midsize	pickup																													745																
truck	light-duty	midsize	pickup		325 (Gen 1)												325 (Gen 2)																															
truck	light-duty	midsize	pickup																								355											700/31XX								31XX-2		
SUV	body-on-frame	midsize	standard																								305		345																			
SUV	body-on-frame	midsize	standard			330 (Gen 1)												330 (Gen 2)																														
SUV	body-on-frame	midsize	standard																						360																							
SUV	body-on-frame	midsize	extended																						370																							
SUV	body-on-frame	fullsize	extended												410/425								830							931/932								K2YC/K2YG					T1YC/T1YG					
SUV	body-on-frame	fullsize	extended luxury																							830				936								K2YL					T1YL					
SUV	body-on-frame	fullsize	standard size												415/420/430								820							921/922								K2UC/K2UG					T1UC/T1UG					
SUV	body-on-frame	fullsize	standard size luxury																			435			820					926								K2UL					T1UL					
SUV	body-on-frame	fullsize	off-road																							825																						
SUV	body-on-frame	compact																				190																										
SUV	crossover	compact	standard																						315						319																	
SUV	crossover	compact	standard																									191/192					172/177															
SUV	crossover	midsize	standard																											193																		
SUV	crossover	midsize	standard																					250																								
SUV	crossover	midsize	standard																						257																							
SUV	crossover	midsize	luxury																								265						166															
SUV	crossover	midsize	luxury																															168														
SUV	crossover	fullsize																												968																		
SUV	crossover	fullsize																												966																		
SUV	crossover	fullsize																													967																	
SUV	crossover	fullsize																														561																
van	cargo	fullsize																	600							610																						
van	MPV	fullsize											199							200																												
van	MPV	fullsize																										201																				
van	MPV	compact																											001																			
