= GMT K2XX =

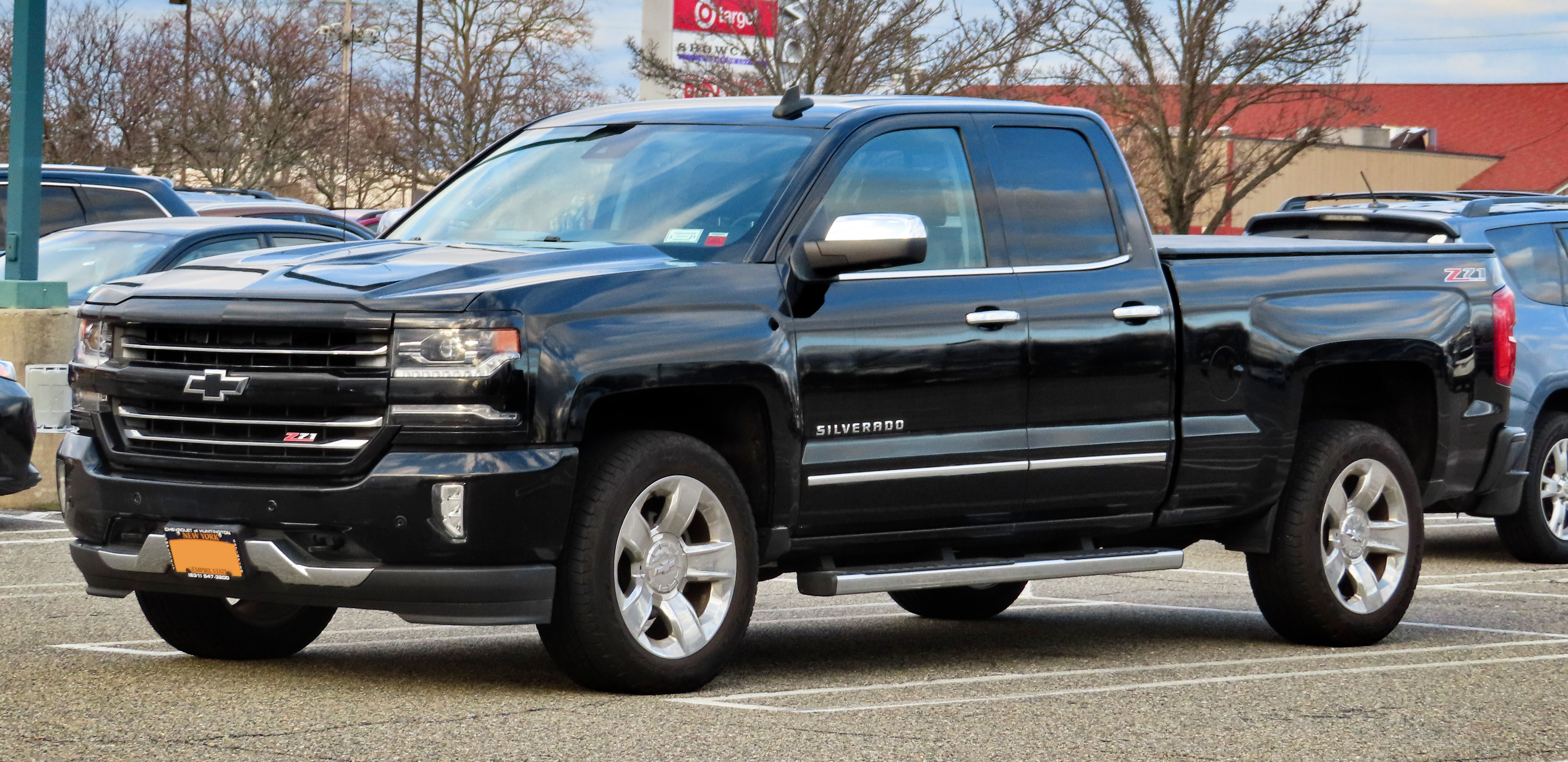

Overview
- Manufacturer: General Motors
- Production: Trucks: April 2013 – December 2019; Extended length SUVs: December 2013 – December 2019; SUVs: January 2014 – December 2019

Body and chassis
- Class: Full-size pickup truck/SUV
- Layout: FR/4WD
- Body styles: 4-door SUV; 4-door extended SUV; 2-door pickup truck 4-door pickup truck

Powertrain
- Engines: LV3 EcoTec3 4.3 L V6 285 hp (213 kW); L83 EcoTec3 5.3 L V8 355 hp (265 kW); L86 EcoTec3 6.2 L V8 420 hp (313 kW); LY6 Vortec 6.0 L V8 360 hp (268 kW); LML Duramax 6.6 L V8 397 hp (296 kW); L5P Duramax 6.6 L V8 445 hp (332 kW)
- Transmissions: 6-speed 6L80 automatic 8-speed 8L90 automatic

Dimensions
- Wheelbase: Silverado/Sierra 1500: 119 in (3,000 mm); 133 in (3,400 mm); 143.5 in (3,640 mm) 153 in (3,900 mm)

Chronology
- Predecessor: GMT900
- Successor: GMT T1XX

GMT K2XX is an assembly code for a vehicle platform architecture developed by General Motors for its line of full-size trucks and SUVs that started production with the 2014 model year. The "XX" is a placeholder for the last two digits of the specific assembly code for each model. The platform, which replaced the GMT900 series that had been in production from 2007 to 2013, was introduced in April 2013 for the 2014 model year on the trucks, followed by the December 2013 production of the 2015 SUVs that debuted in February 2014.

The first GMT K2XX vehicles produced were the light-duty 2014 model year Chevrolet Silverado and GMC Sierra full-size pickups, with Silao producing the light-duty crew cabs first, followed afterwards by Fort Wayne assembling the light- and heavy-duty regular and double cabs. The 2015 Chevrolet Tahoe/Suburban, GMC Yukon/XL, and Cadillac Escalade/ESV full-size SUVs were the next vehicles to start production, followed by the 2015 Chevrolet Silverado HD and GMC Sierra HD. The extended cab was replaced with the four-door double cab; the light-duty models were only available with the 6.5-foot box. However, a light-duty crew cab pickup with a 6.5-foot box was introduced, which was previously only available in heavy-duty models.

The K2XX platform marks the first time that no sport utility trucks or hybrid SUVs would be built on this platform, as the Chevrolet Avalanche and Cadillac Escalade EXT SUTs, and the hybrid versions of the Silverado, Sierra, and full-size SUVs were discontinued after the 2013 model year. However, fuel economy of GMT K2XX vehicles still increased over the GMT900 predecessors thanks to usage of new Generation V/EcoTec3 V8 and V6 engines with direct injection, weight savings from the use of more high-strength steel and aluminum hood, and on some models, the use of the 8L90 automatic transmission. An eAssist mild hybrid version of the Chevrolet Silverado and GMC Sierra crew-cab pickup trucks became available on a limited basis from 2016 to 2018. Turbocharged and diesel engines for light-duty models were also under consideration for future GMT K2XX trucks and SUVs.

There have been customer complaints relative to 8L90 driveline vibrations in the K2XX platform dubbed the "Chevy Shake".

The GMT K2XX products were produced at four GM assembly plants: Arlington (all SUVs), Flint (crew cab pickups with 6.5-foot and 8-foot boxes, plus regular and crew cab chassis-cab trucks), and Fort Wayne (regular and double cab pickups) in the United States, along with Silao Assembly in Mexico for the crew cab light-duty pickups. Near the end of the 2018 model year, production of double cab pickups was moved from Fort Wayne to Oshawa Assembly in Canada, while the 2019 heavy-duty regular cab pickup was built at Flint.

The K2XX was replaced by the GMT T1XX platform beginning in the 2019 model year.

== Applications ==
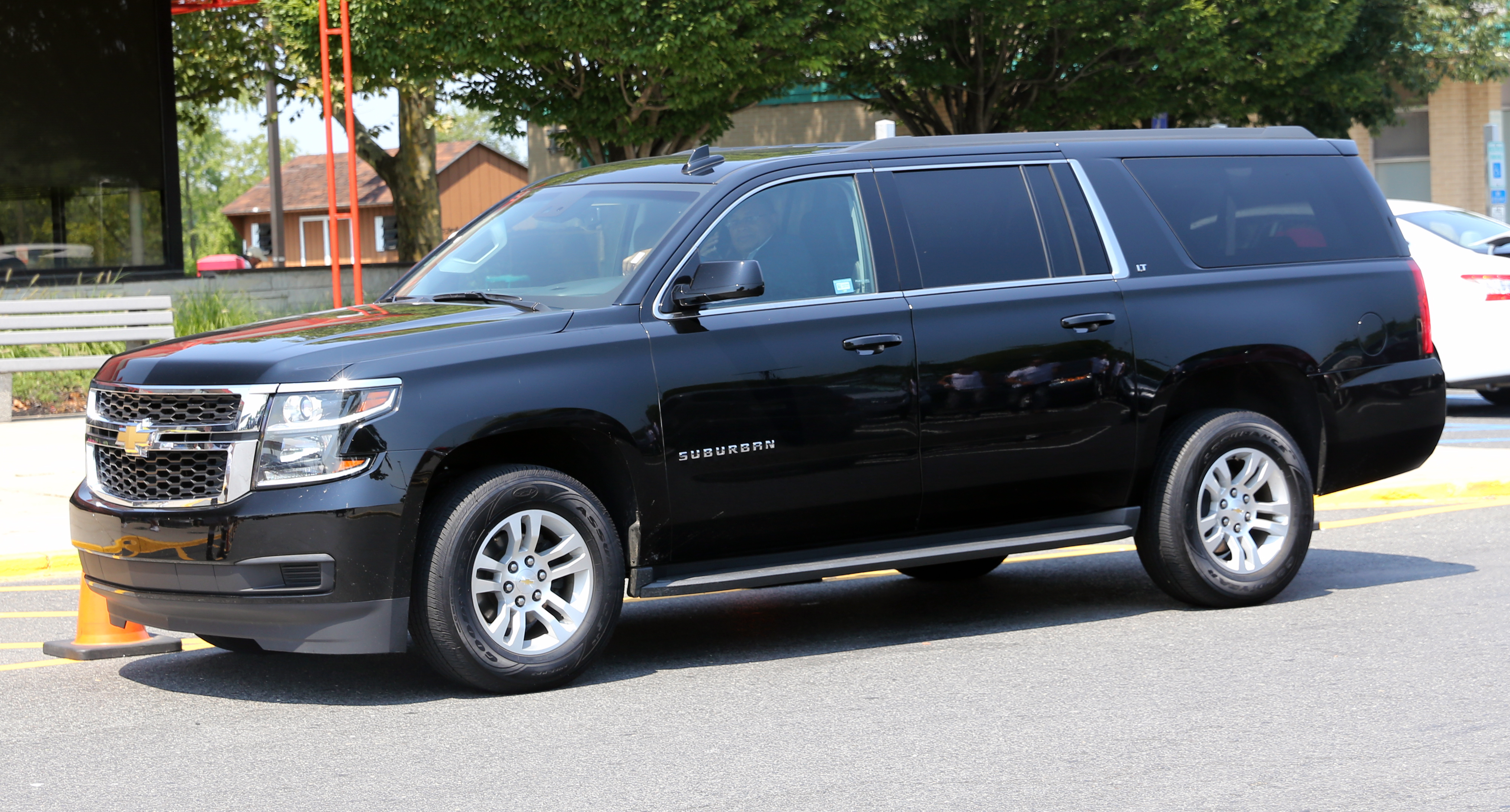
2015 Chevrolet Suburban

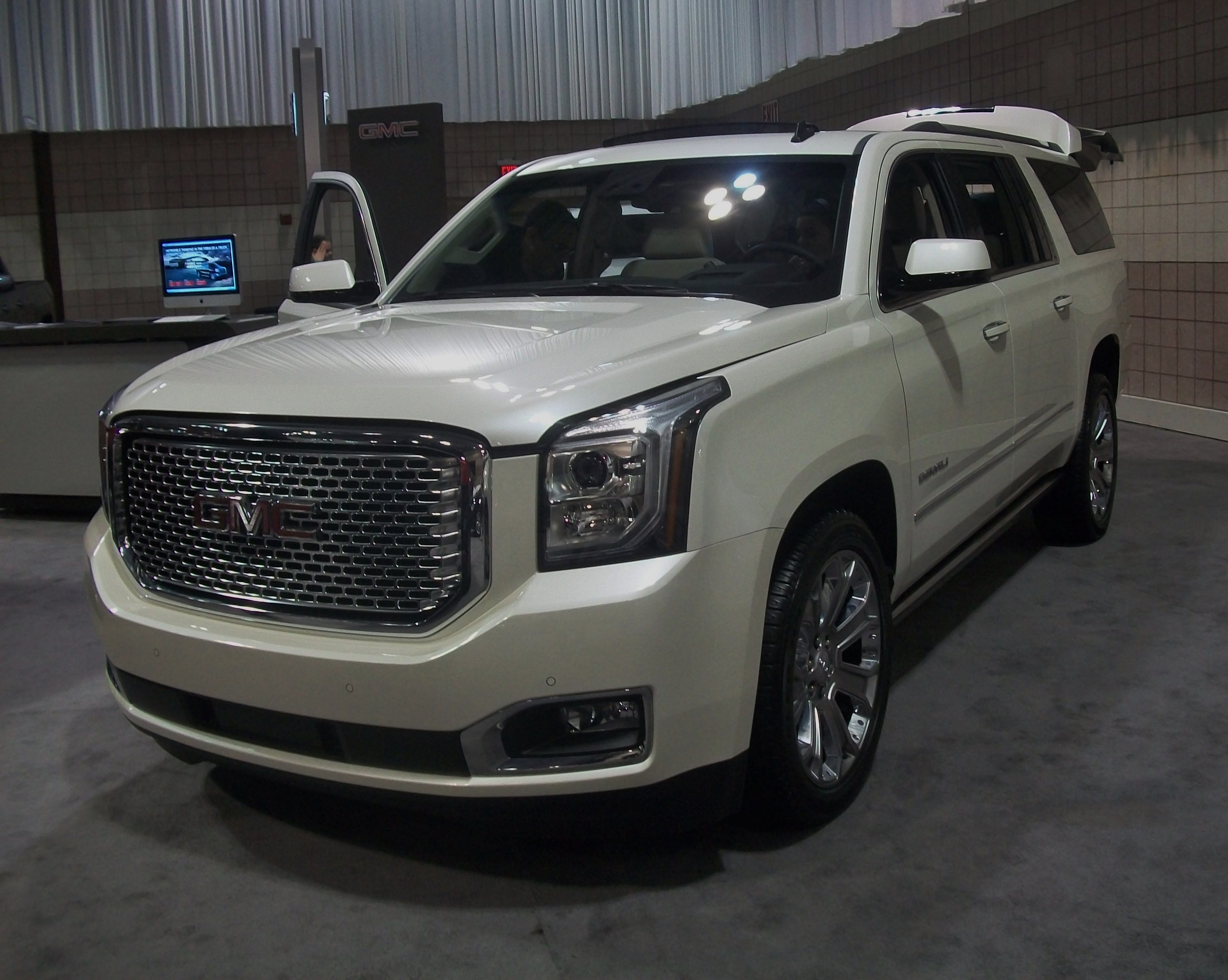
2015 GMC Yukon XL Denali

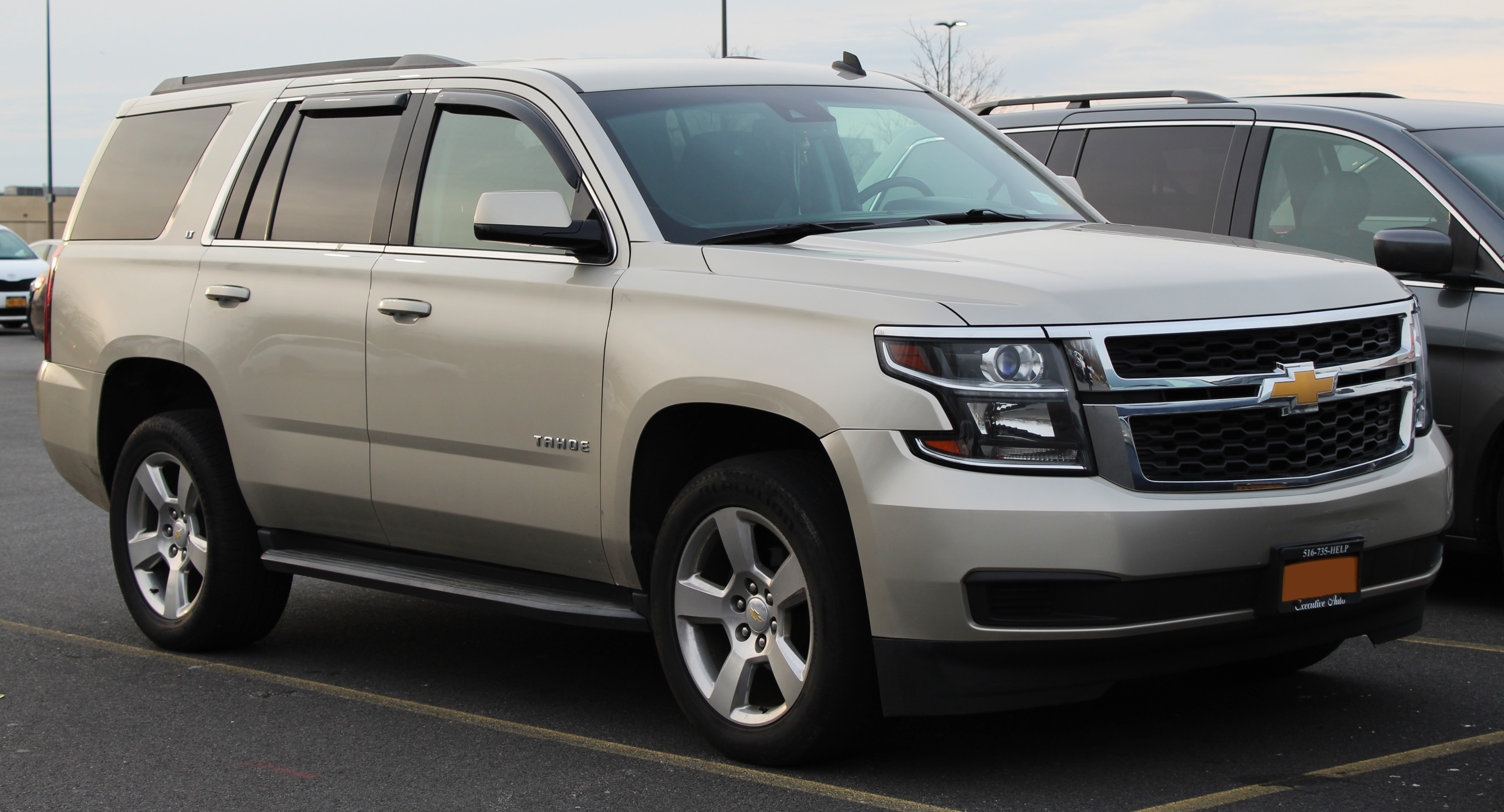
2015 Chevrolet Tahoe

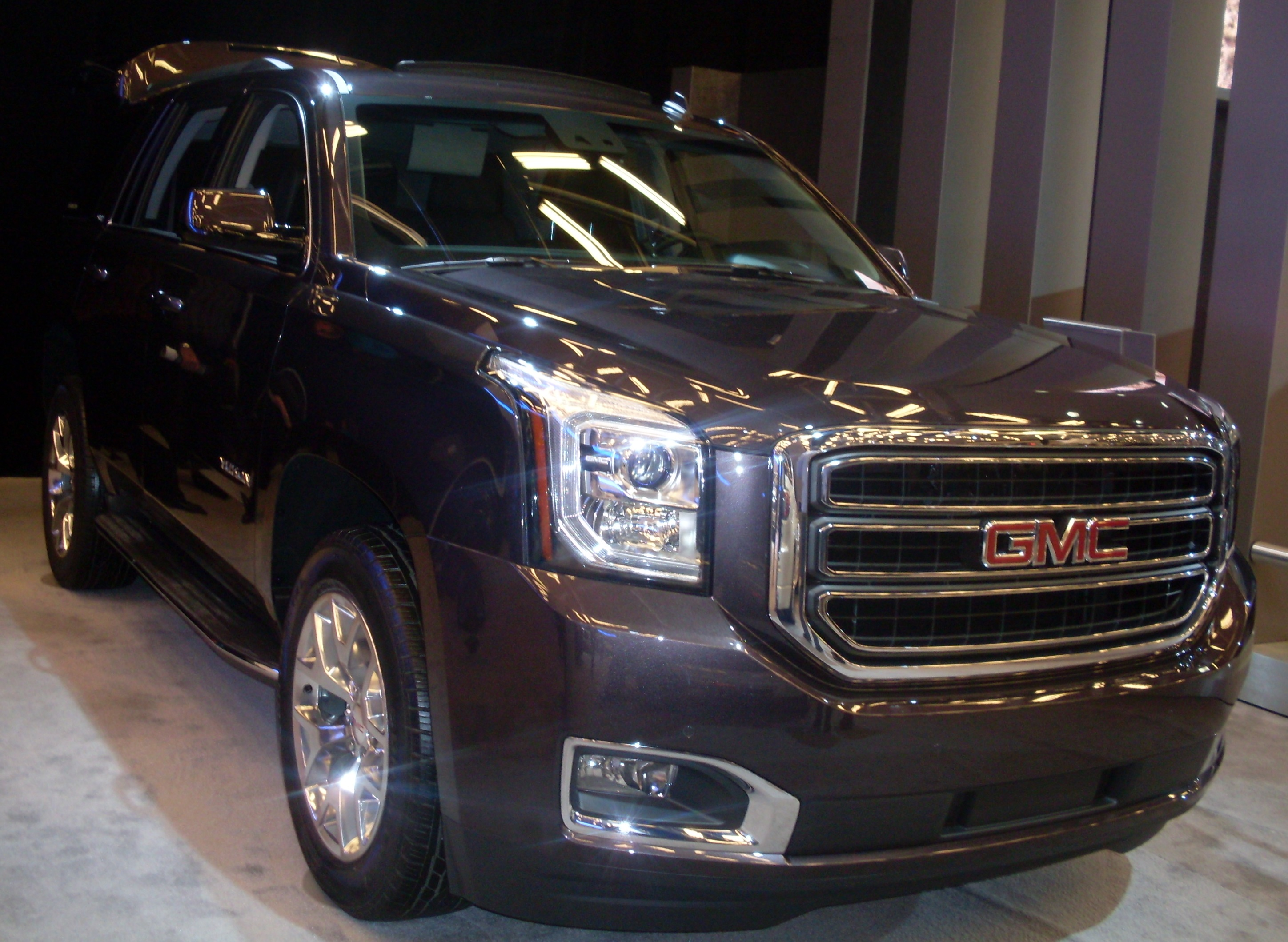
2015 GMC Yukon

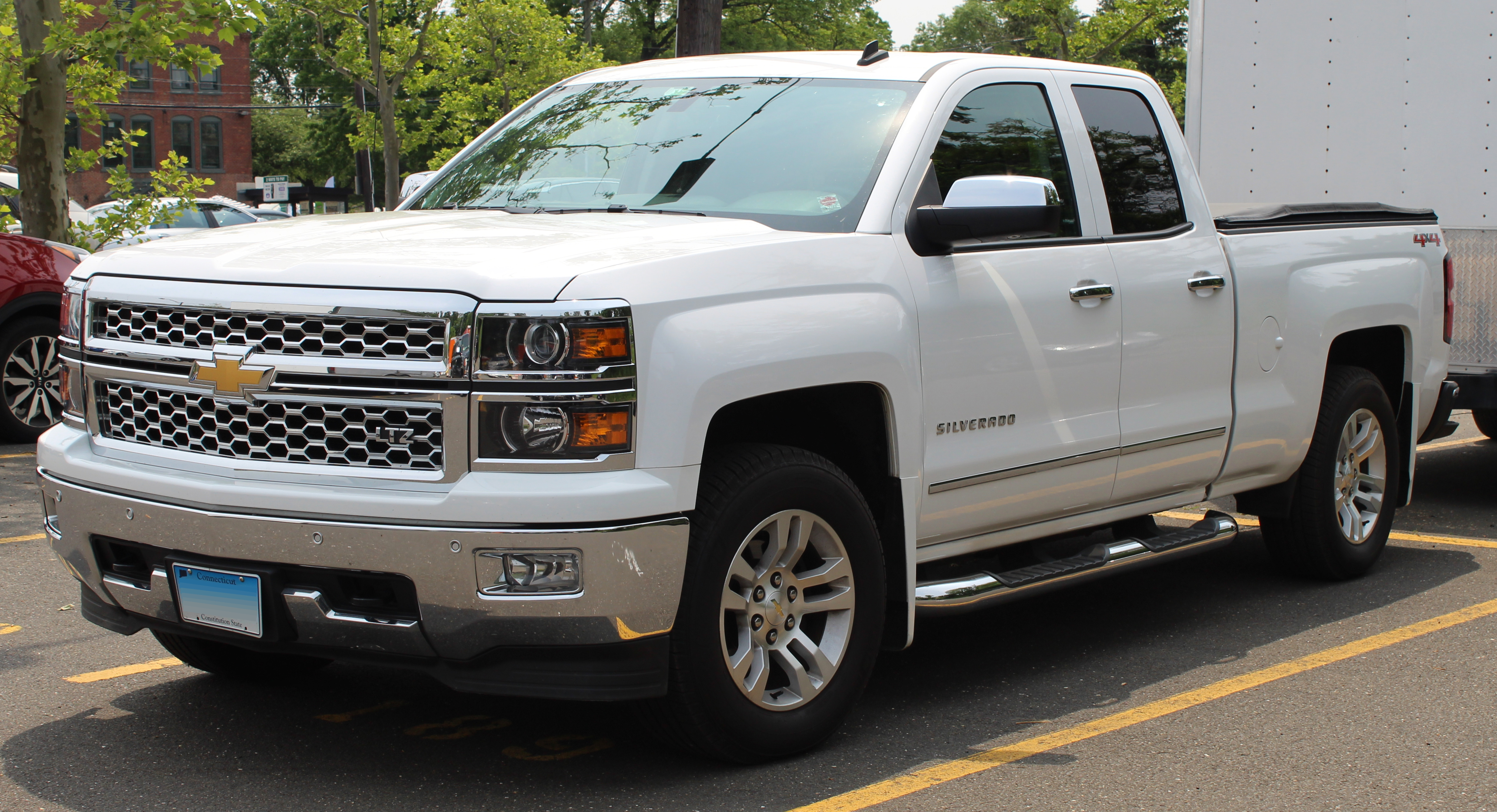
2014 Chevrolet Silverado

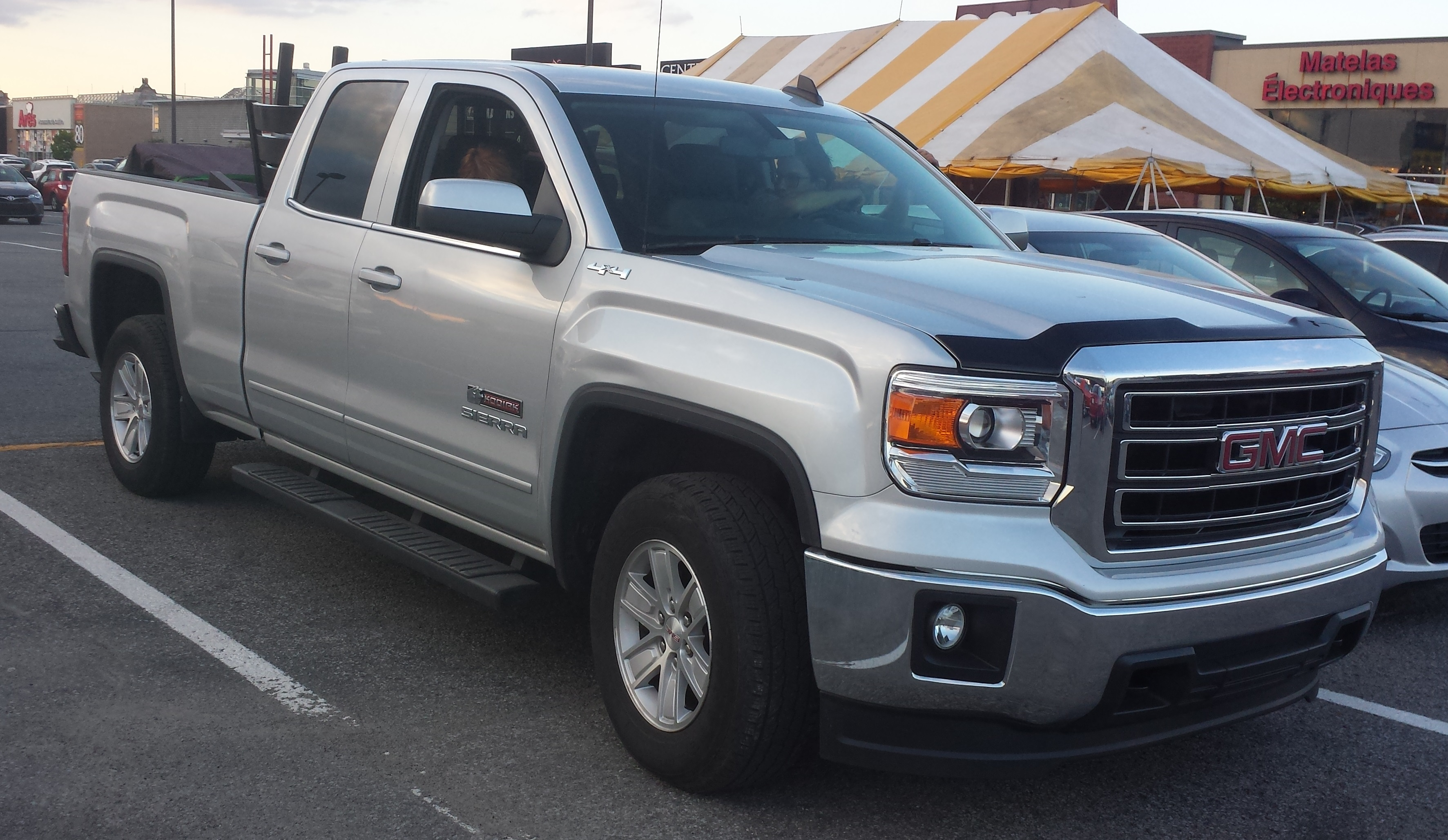
2014 GMC Sierra

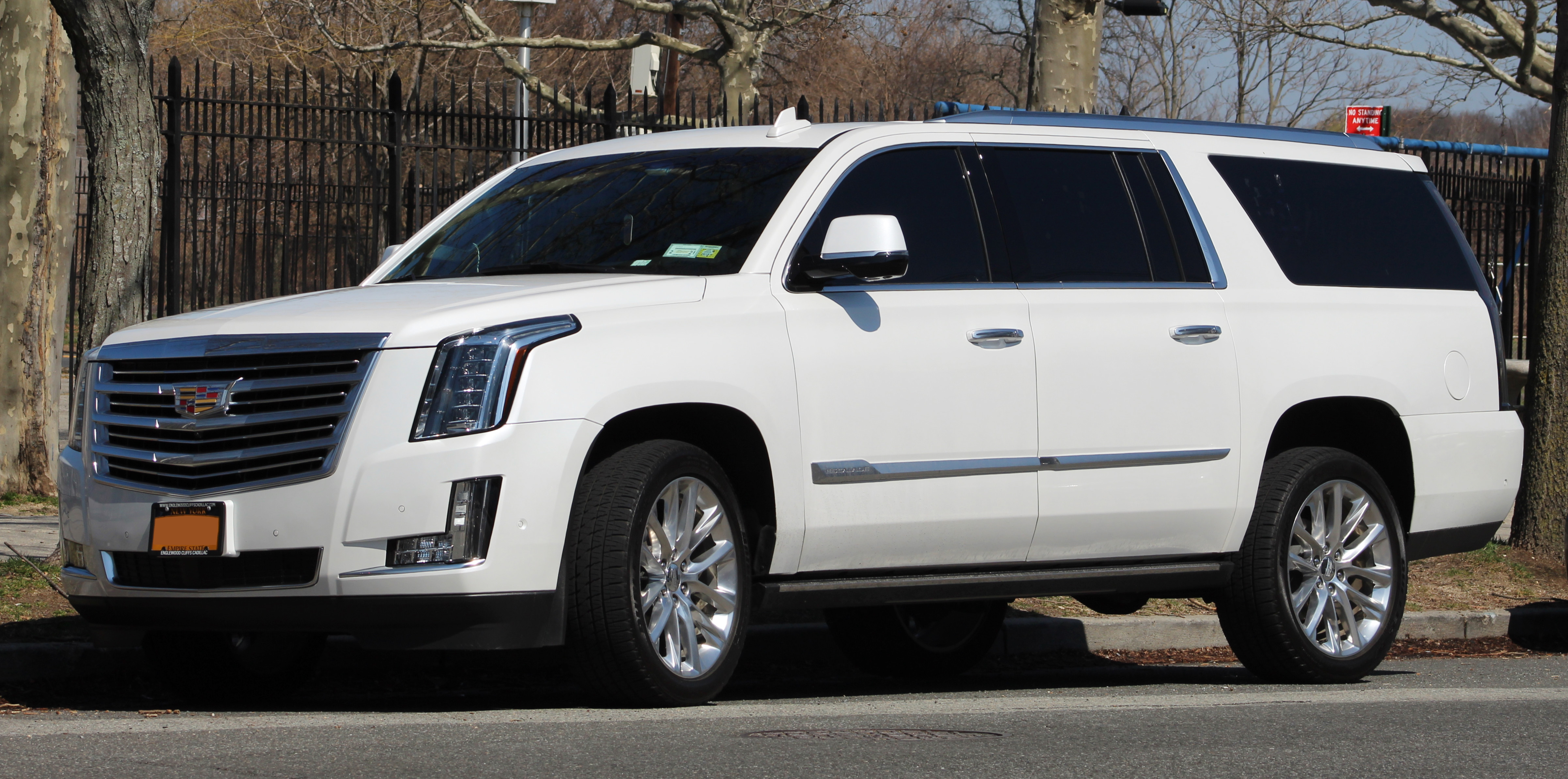
2015 Cadillac Escalade ESV

Basic platform	Years	Model	Notes	Code	Introduction	Production	Sale
GMTK2XX	2014–2018	Chevrolet Silverado	Regular Cab; Double Cab; Crew Cab	GMTK2RC; GMTK2EC; GMTK2CC	September 26, 2013, at The Texas State Fair	Silao; Fort Wayne; Flint	Fall 2013
GMTK2XX	2014–2018	GMC Sierra	Regular Cab; Double Cab; Crew Cab	GMTK2RG; GMTK2EG; GMTK2CG	September 26, 2013, at The Texas State Fair	Silao; Fort Wayne; Flint	Fall 2013
GMTK2XX	2015–2019	Chevrolet Silverado HD	Regular Cab; Double Cab; Crew Cab	GMTK2HC	September 26, 2013, at The Texas State Fair	Silao; Fort Wayne; Flint	January 2014
GMTK2XX	2015–2019	GMC Sierra HD	Regular Cab; Double Cab; Crew Cab	GMTK2HG	September 26, 2013, at The Texas State Fair	Silao; Fort Wayne; Flint	January 2014
GMTK2XX	2015–2020	Chevrolet Tahoe	4-door SUV	GMTK2UC	September 12, 2013	Arlington	February 2014
GMTK2XX	2015–2020	GMC Yukon	4-door SUV	GMTK2UG	September 12, 2013	Arlington	February 2014
GMTK2XX	2015–2020	Cadillac Escalade	4-door SUV	GMTK2UL	October 7, 2013	Arlington	April 2014
GMTK2XX	2015–2020	Chevrolet Suburban	4-door extended SUV	GMTK2YC	September 12, 2013	Arlington	February 2014
GMTK2XX	2015–2020	GMC Yukon XL	4-door extended SUV	GMTK2YG	September 12, 2013	Arlington	February 2014
GMTK2XX	2015–2020	Cadillac Escalade ESV	4-door extended SUV	GMTK2YL	October 7, 2013	Arlington	April 2014
GMTK2XX	2019	Chevrolet Silverado LD	Double Cab	GMTK2EC		Oshawa	
GMTK2XX	2019	GMC Sierra Limited	Double Cab	GMTK2EG		Oshawa	

== See also ==
- General Motors GMT platform
- List of General Motors platforms
