= Chevrolet Avalanche =

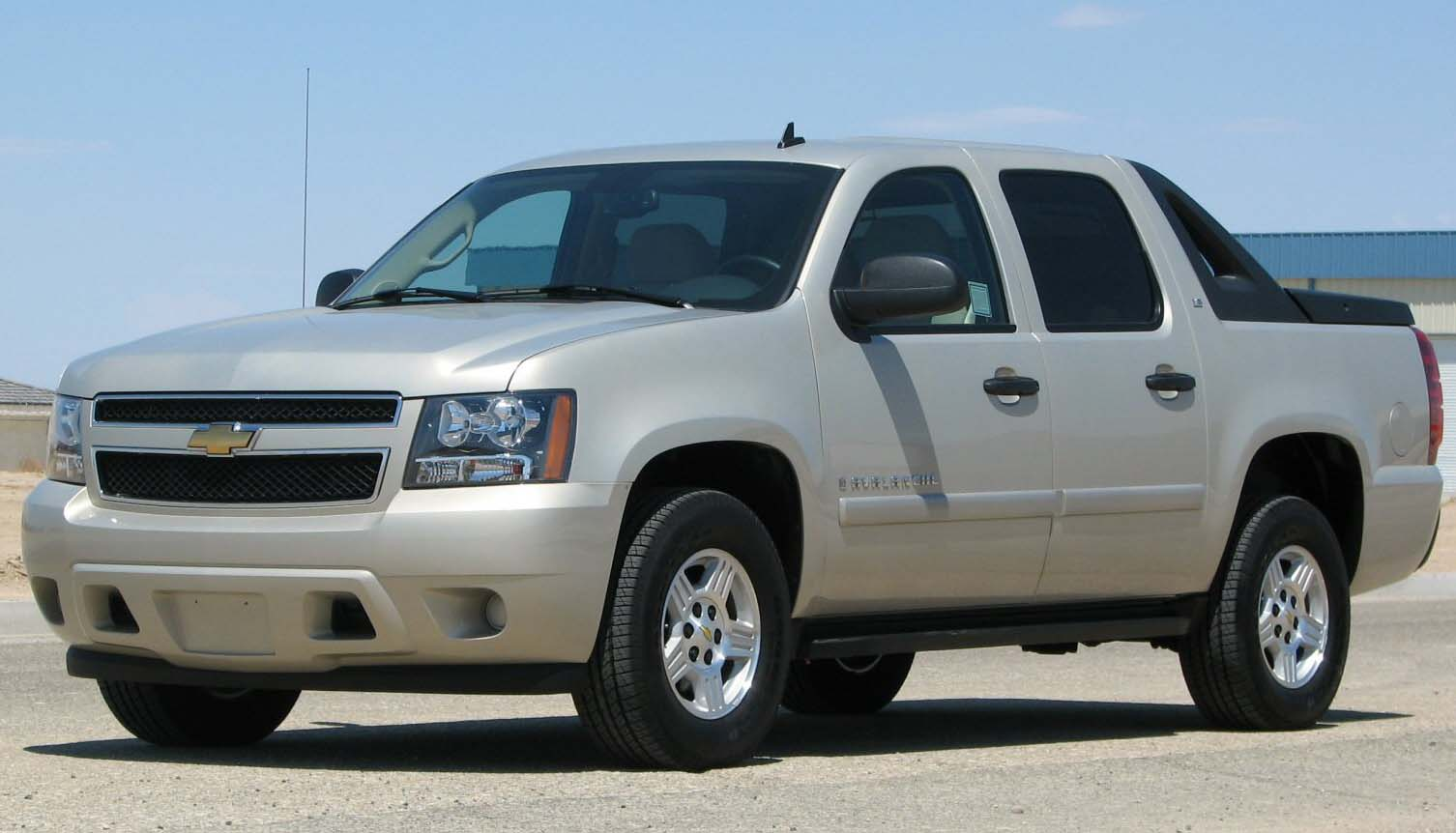

Overview
- Manufacturer: General Motors
- Production: 2001–2013
- Assembly: Silao, Guanajuato, Mexico (GM Silao Plant)
- Designer: Marc R. Asposito

Body and chassis
- Class: Full-size pickup truck
- Body style: 4-door pickup truck
- Layout: Front engine, rear-wheel drive / four-wheel drive
- Chassis: Body-on-frame

Dimensions
- Wheelbase: 130.0 in (3,302 mm)

The Chevrolet Avalanche is a four-door, five- or six-passenger full-size pickup truck that was manufactured by General Motors and marketed by its Chevrolet division. The Avalanche was a hybrid between the Chevrolet Suburban SUV and the Chevrolet Silverado pickup truck, sharing the chassis with the Suburban. Unlike a typical pickup truck where the bed is mounted separately from the cab on the frame, the bed of the Avalanche was integrated with the cab body.

It prominently featured a "midgate" behind the second row of seats that could be folded inward and down, with the seats, to create a longer bed area. The Avalanche was manufactured across two generations starting in 2001 and ending in 2013.

Breaking with a long-standing tradition, the Avalanche was available solely as a Chevrolet model without a GMC variant. Instead, Cadillac marketed a re-badged Avalanche. The midgate design would be adapted for use on the GMC Envoy XUV and Hummer H2 SUT.

== First generation (2001–2006) ==
First generation
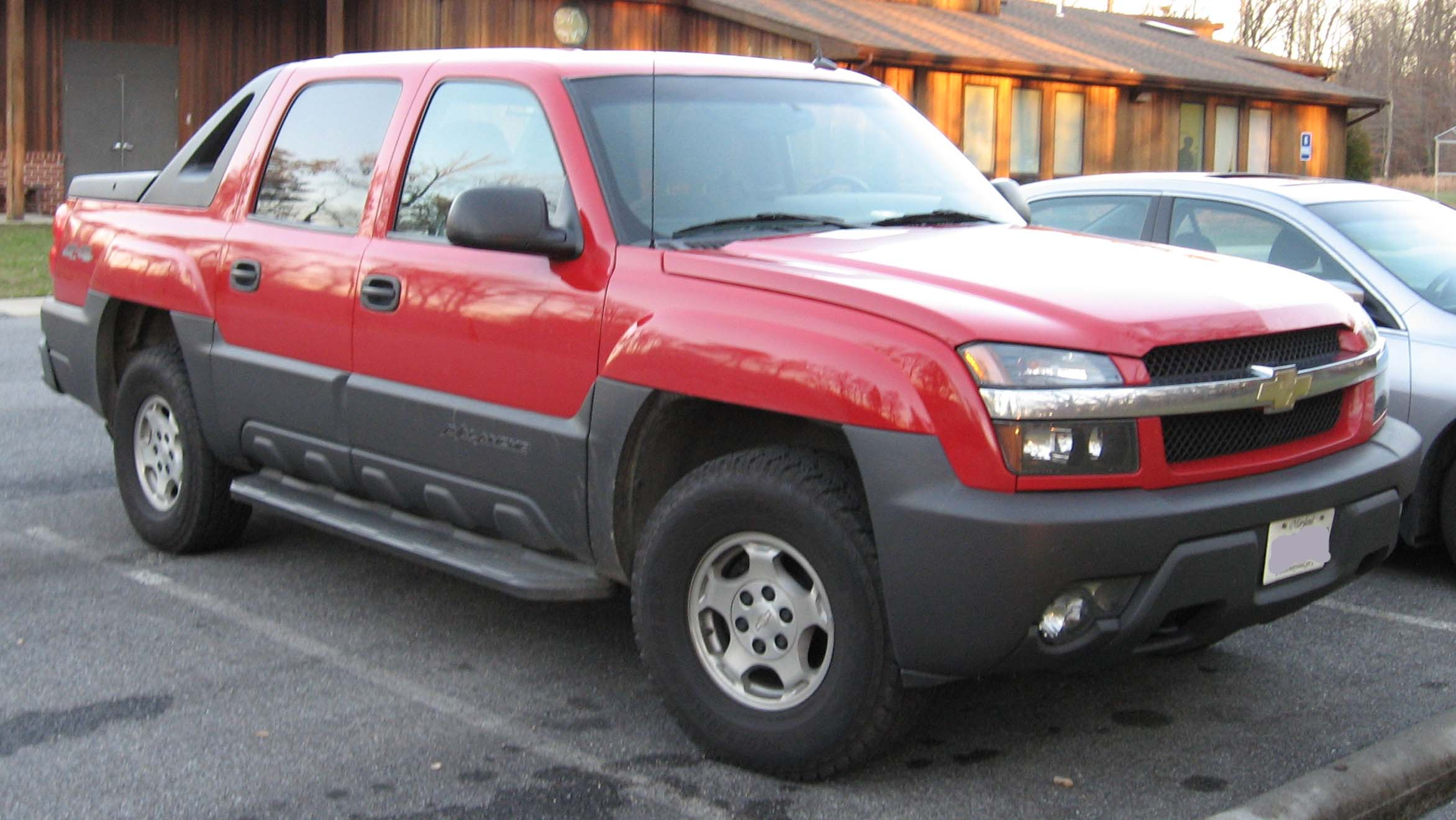

Overview
- Production: 2001–2006
- Model years: 2002–2006

Body and chassis
- Platform: GMT805
- Related: Chevrolet Silverado/GMC Sierra; Chevrolet Suburban/GMC Yukon XL; Cadillac Escalade ESV; Cadillac Escalade EXT

Powertrain
- Engine: 5.3 L LM7 V8 (gasoline); 5.3 L L59 V8 (gasoline/E85); 8.1 L L18 V8 (gasoline)
- Transmission: 4-speed 4L60-E automatic; 4-speed 4L85-E automatic

Dimensions
- Length: 2002–03: 221.7 in (5,631 mm); 2004–06: 221.6 in (5,629 mm)
- Width: 79.8 in (2,027 mm)
- Height: 2002–03: 73.3 in (1,862 mm); 2004–06: 73.6 in (1,869 mm)
- Curb weight: 1500 2WD: 5,500 lb (2,495 kg) 1500 4WD: 5,700 lb (2,585 kg); 2500 2WD: 6,400 lb (2,903 kg) 2500 4WD: 6,700 lb (3,039 kg)

The Avalanche was launched in September 2001 as a 2002 model on the GMT800 platform. First year Avalanches featured light gray plastic body cladding, intended to provide visual distinction from the Suburban/Yukon XL. The Avalanche also gave the public an advance look at the next generation of front fascia designs for the entire GM line. A full width chrome strip splits each lamp assembly and the grille, with a gold Chevrolet "bow tie" in the center. The hood and fenders featured aggressive folds, in contrast to the softer designs seen on other models built on the GMT800 platform.

Avalanche was nominated for the North American SUV of the Year award and was Motor Trend magazine's Truck of the Year for 2002.

The Avalanche was originally marketed as being able to "change from an SUV to a super SUV." This was made possible by a plastic cover and an exclusive "midgate," marketed by GM as the Convert-a-Cab system, which could open and close. The midgate was a divider behind the second row of seats that could be folded inward and down, with the seats, to create a longer bed area, or folded up to make a larger cab area. A similar midgate was found on the Subaru Baja (2003–2006), Cadillac Escalade EXT (a rebadged Avalanche), Hummer H2 SUT, and GMC Envoy XUV.

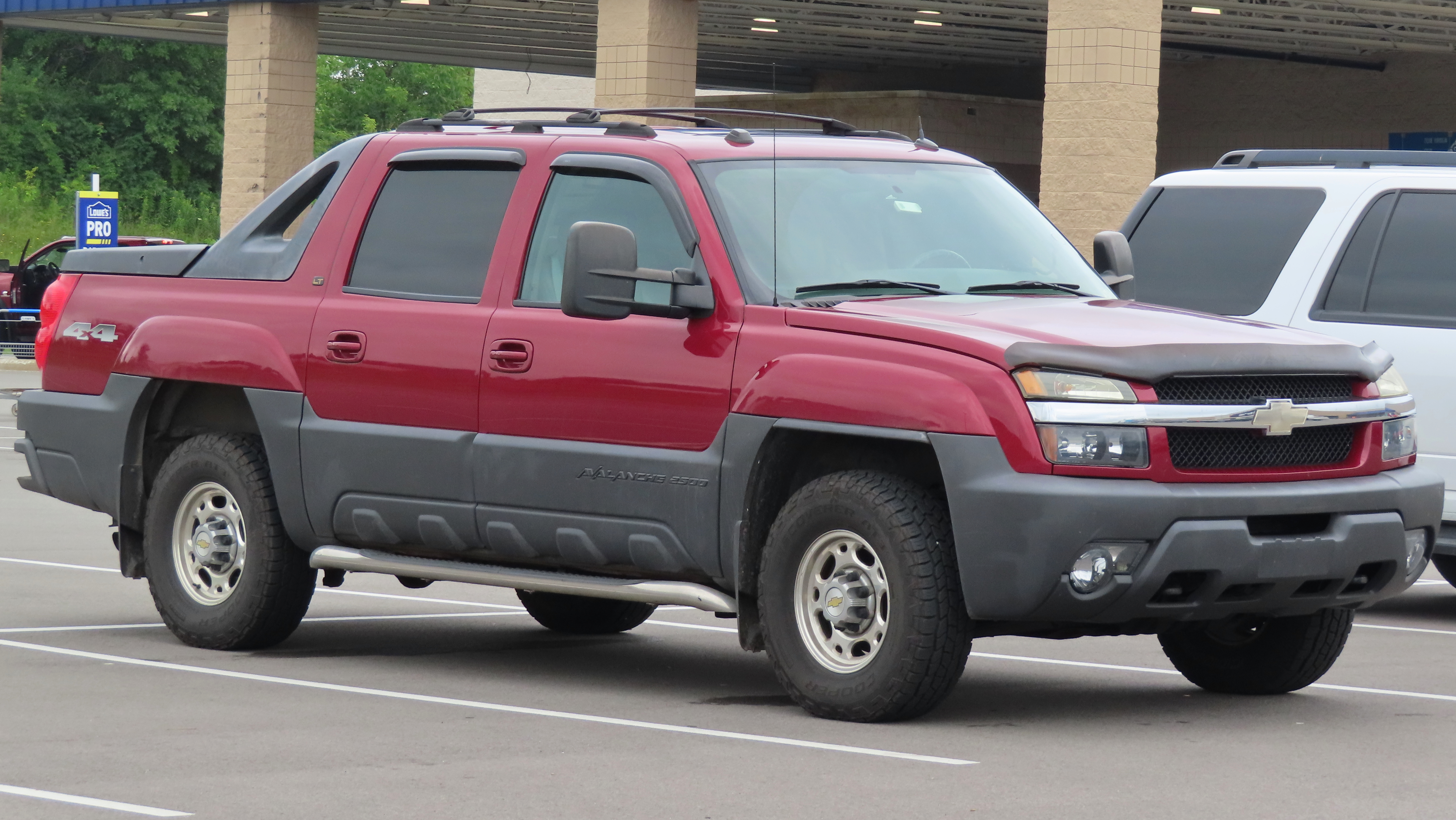
Avalanche 2500 with tow mirrors

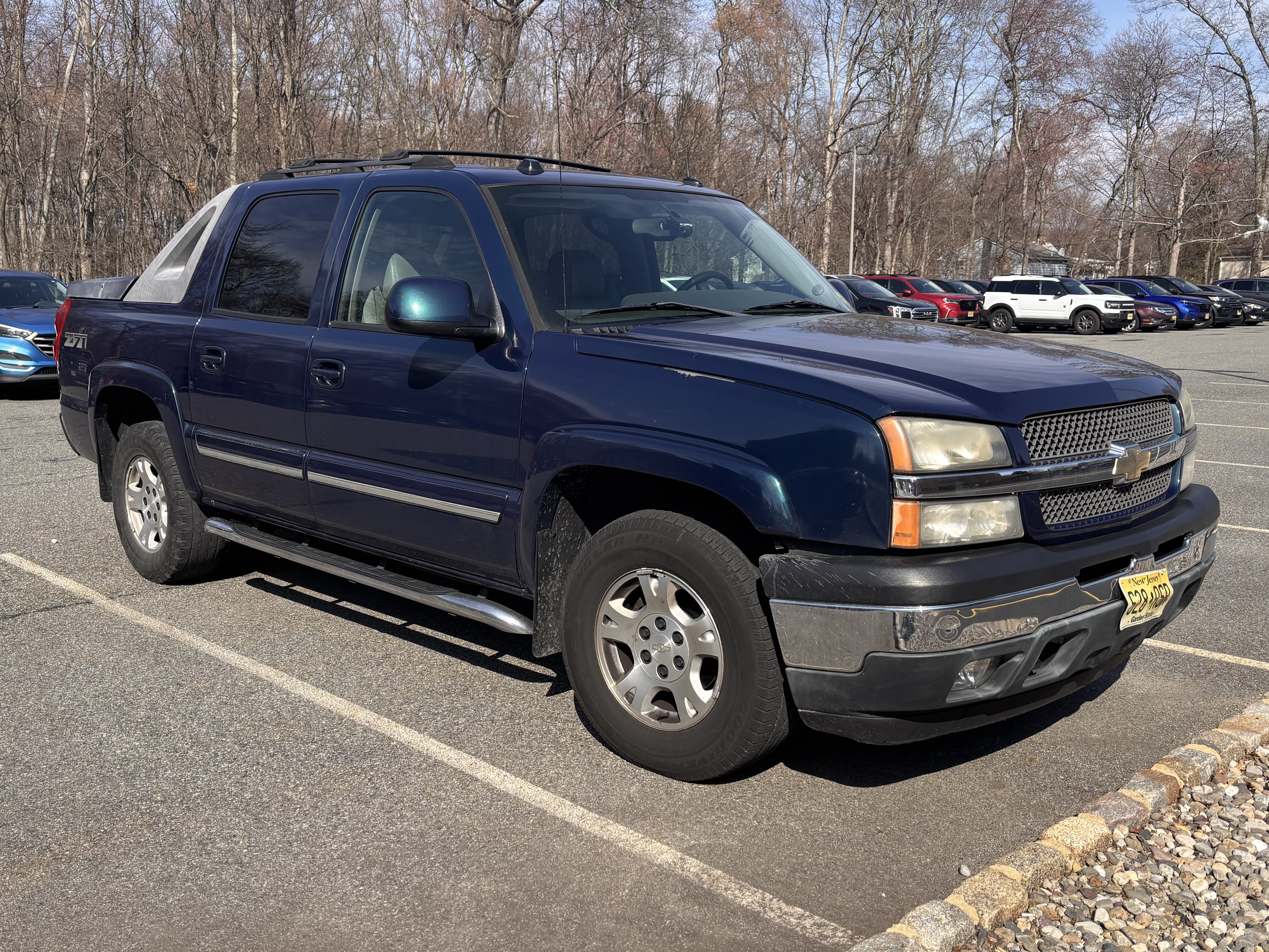
Avalanche 1500 4WD

The truck was offered as a half-ton 1500 series with a Vortec 5.3L V8 producing 285 hp (216 kW) or as a three-quarter-ton 2500 series with a Vortec 8.1L V8 with 340 hp (253 kW) and the 4L85-E four-speed transmission. The base layout is rear-wheel drive, but there is an available with selectable high/low four-wheel drive. Avalanche 2500 models from 2004 to 2006 were exclusively available with four-wheel drive.

A Z71 Off-Road package was available with off-road suspension, GM's AutoTrac full-time push-button four-wheel-drive system, all-terrain P265/70R17 white-lettered Goodyear tires, seventeen-inch alloy wheels, leather seating surfaces with waterproof accents, front dual power bucket seats, cloth door panel inserts, GM's OnStar telematics system, all-weather rubber floor mats, Chevrolet bowtie emblems embedded into the backrests of the seats (for 2002 models), dual-zone automatic climate controls with rear HVAC vents and remote controls, remote radio controls with headphone jacks for two pairs of headphones, a security system, gray-finished side running boards, power-adjustable, heated side-view mirrors, SRS side impact airbags. Aside from these details, a Z71 Off-Road decal on the rear side panels identified an Avalanche equipped with this package. Full leather seating surfaces were an available option, also removing the cloth door panel inserts, and also added heated front seats.

A Z66 Premium On-Road package was also available with the Z71 Off-Road package equipment, replacing the off-road suspension with sport on-road suspension and without four-wheel drive. Aside from these details, a Z66 On-Road sticker on the rear side panels identified an Avalanche equipped with this package. As with the Z71 Off-Road package, full leather seating surfaces without the cloth accents were an available option, also removing the cloth door panel inserts, and also added heated front seats.

To further distinguish it from its Silverado siblings, the Avalanche was practically fully equipped and only came with bodyside cladding. The Avalanche included features such as 16-inch alloy wheels and tires (chromed steel on the 2500 model), an AM/FM stereo with single-disc CD player and six speakers, cloth seating surfaces, front bench seat with power front driver's seat, power windows, power door locks, keyless entry, full instrumentation, dual front airbags, and air conditioning. Options included OnStar telematics system, cassette player, leather seating surfaces, front dual power bucket seats that could be heated, and side airbags for the front seats. A North Face Edition, in partnership with the North Face brand included limited exterior color options, a unique Ebony/Green leather interior, special exterior ornamentation and decals, white-faced gauges, OnStar telematics system, specially colored door panel inserts and speaker grilles, and more.

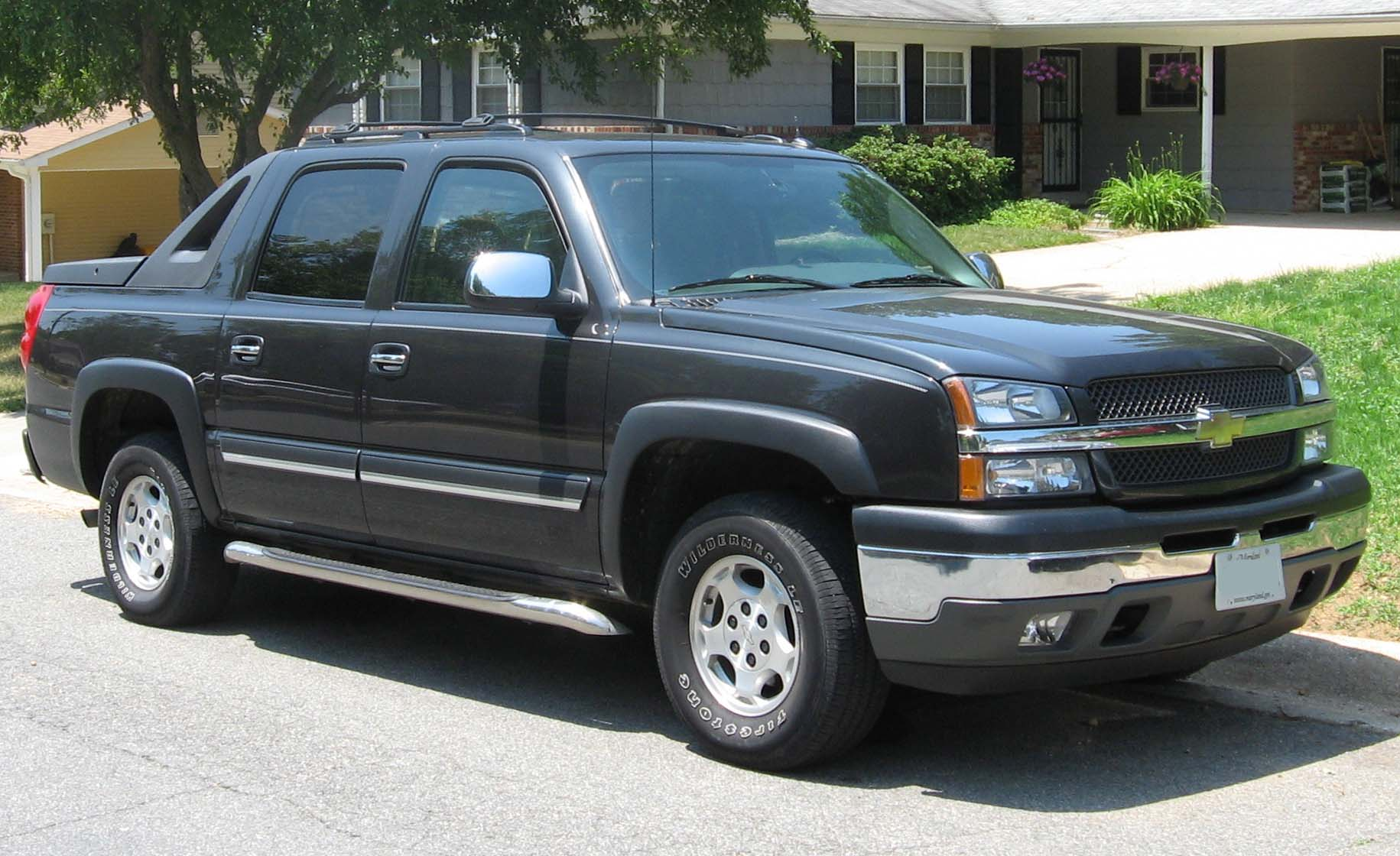
Avalanche WBH (Without Body Hardware)

For 2003, the Avalanche was slightly changed. 2003 models featured a darker cladding, but GM's new president, Rick Wagoner, demanded the removal of this "unpopular" trim (as did certain elements of the public). From mid-year, Avalanche could be ordered without cladding. The uncladded model, known as "Without Body Hardware" (or its initialism "WBH," which is also an RPO code), and alternatively called "slicksides" by GM marketers, resembled the 2003–2005 Silverado 1500 in the front. A new interior—shared with the Tahoe and Suburban—added a new, larger steering wheel with subsequent audio, cruise, and speed controls; an optional six-speaker premium Bose sound system with external amplifier; a new gauge cluster with information center and memory for the front driver's seat, brake and accelerator pedals, and side-view mirror position (on some models); new radio head units, which included an AM/FM stereo with either a single-disc or six-disc CD/MP3 changer, Radio Data System, and optional XM Satellite Radio; standard OnStar telematics system with steering wheel controls; new warning chimes that played through the vehicle's audio system instead of through a separate speaker behind the dashboard; and newly available 17-inch alloy wheels and tires. Optional features included rear audio controls with headphone jacks and a rear DVD entertainment system by Panasonic with wireless headphones. The WBH option was only available in the 1500 series.

=== Avalanche Base Camp Concept (1999) ===
A pre-production version of the Avalanche was shown as the Avalanche Base Camp Concept. The truck, which carried the Vehicle Identification Number (VIN) of 1GCFK13U32X4618EX, was painted in Bright Yellow Clear Coat, and featured a Neutral cloth interior with contrasting yellow trim on the seats and Chevrolet Bowtie emblems on the seatbacks, speaker grilles, and door panels, as well as Cadillac Escalade–style wood trim on the instrument panel. The truck was powered by the 6.0L Vortec V8 gasoline engine, which was not offered on the production Avalanche. In addition, the Avalanche Base Camp Concept featured unique accessories that were not available on the production truck, such as a Bose premium audio system, which included a bass module (subwoofer) and bedside-mounted speakers; a unique roof rack; a rear DVD entertainment system with three LCD monitors; dual Nokia 5125 cellular phones with color-coordinated yellow faceplates; a "keyless" ignition system that included a push-button to start; a battery cutoff switch (for show purposes); a trailer hitch-mounted cooler; a unique front brush guard and side running boards; a bed painted to match the interior of the vehicle; a Diamond-Plate tailgate liner; a bed-mounted LCD screen; "Avalanche Base Camp" embossing on the body side cladding; and a mobile cooking stove and sink, among other accessories. The vehicle was sold at the 2006 Barrett-Jackson collector car auction in Palm Beach, Florida, for $20,900 (equivalent to $33,379 in 2025). It was later listed with 2,000 miles on the Cars & Bids online auction website in July 2023.

=== Cladding issues ===
Soon after the release of the Chevrolet Avalanche, customers began to notice cosmetic issues with the cladding on their vehicles. Over time, exposure to heat and sunlight would cause a chalky faded appearance. It was especially noticeable on the cargo bed panels, and sail-panel windows where "zebra striping" would appear. Customer reaction to this problem resulted in General Motors agreeing to a one-time treatment of a product called ArmorDillo. This product would temporarily restore the cladding for a period of about six months; thereafter, it would wear off and need to be re-applied. Realizing this was not a permanent solution, GM, together with Gatorback Coatings, developed a coating that could be applied to the cladding to restore it to a like-new shine. This product was designed to etch into the plastic and bond a new layer of tinted acrylic over the faded plastic. Customers within the original factory warranty could go to their dealership to have it restored. General Motors did not use side body cladding on the second-generation model.

=== Engines ===
Year	Engine	Power	Torque	RPO Code	VIN Code (8th Digit)	Notes
2002–2003	5.3L Vortec 5300 V8	285 hp (213 kW) @ 5200 RPM	325 lb⋅ft (441 N⋅m) @ 4000 RPM	LM7 L59 (flex-fuel)	T Z (flex-fuel)	Power and torque ratings are on regular gasoline. Flex-fuel capability available in 2005 and 2006.
2004–2005	5.3L Vortec 5300 V8	295 hp (220 kW) @ 5200 RPM	330 lb⋅ft (450 N⋅m) @ 4000 RPM	LM7 L59 (flex-fuel)	T Z (flex-fuel)	Power and torque ratings are on regular gasoline. Flex-fuel capability available in 2005 and 2006.
2006	5.3L Vortec 5300 V8	295 hp (220 kW) @ 5200 RPM	335 lb⋅ft (454 N⋅m) @ 4000 RPM	LM7 L59 (flex-fuel)	T Z (flex-fuel)	Power and torque ratings are on regular gasoline. Flex-fuel capability available in 2005 and 2006.
2002–2003	8.1L Vortec 8100 V8	340 hp (254 kW) @ 4200 RPM	455 lb⋅ft (617 N⋅m) @ 3200 RPM	L18	G	2500 only.
2004	8.1L Vortec 8100 V8	320 hp (239 kW) @ 4200 RPM	445 lb⋅ft (603 N⋅m) @ 3200 RPM	L18	G	2500 only.
2005	8.1L Vortec 8100 V8	320 hp (239 kW) @ 4200 RPM	440 lb⋅ft (600 N⋅m) @ 3200 RPM	L18	G	2500 only.
2006	8.1L Vortec 8100 V8	325 hp (242 kW) @ 4200 RPM	447 lb⋅ft (606 N⋅m) @ 3200 RPM	L18	G	2500 only.

== Second generation (2007–2013) ==
Second generation (GMT900)
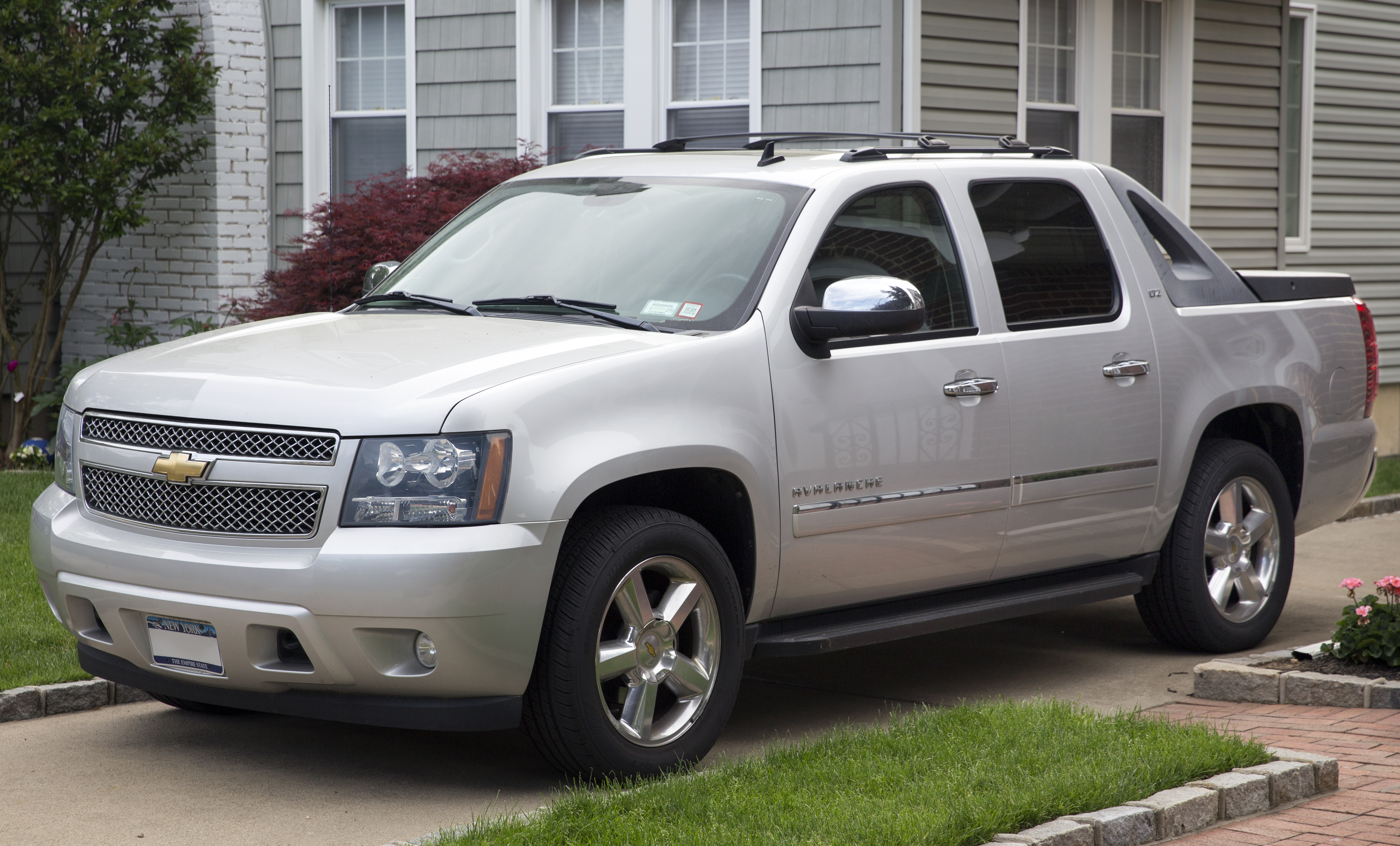

Overview
- Production: 2006–2013
- Model years: 2007–2013

Body and chassis
- Platform: GM GMT900 platform (Series GMT940: GMT941)
- Related: Cadillac Escalade EXT; Cadillac Escalade ESV; Chevrolet Silverado/GMC Sierra; Chevrolet Suburban/GMC Yukon XL

Powertrain
- Engine: 5.3 L LY5 V8 (gasoline); 5.3 L LMG V8 (gasoline/E85); 5.3 L LC9 V8 (gasoline/E85); 6.0 L L76 V8 (gasoline)
- Transmission: 4-speed GM 4L60-E transmission automatic (2007–08); 6-speed 6L80 automatic (2009–2013)

Dimensions
- Length: 221.3 in (5,621 mm)
- Width: 79.1 in (2,009 mm)
- Height: 76.6 in (1,946 mm)
- Curb weight: 5,400–6,000 lb (2,449–2,722 kg)

The second generation Avalanche was introduced at the Chicago Auto Show in February 2006 with production using the GMT900 platform and commencing at the Silao Assembly plant in April 2006. The Avalanche again combined the front end styling of its rebadged variants, the Tahoe/Yukon along with the midgate and integrated bed as found on the previous generation. The Avalanche mirrored the standard and available features of the Suburban and the Tahoe. The 2500 model of the previous generation was discontinued.

A special Z71 package was offered for the second-generation Avalanche, available on the LT trim with either the 2LT or 3LT option groups. This off-road package consisted of a suspension tuned for rough terrain, an exclusive automatic-locking rear differential, aluminum under-body skid plates (visible from the front of the truck), wheel flares, badges, wheels, and tires.

The steering system was revised from the traditional recirculating-ball to a rack-and-pinion also found in the Tahoe and Suburban 1500. Later models introduced another version of the Vortec 5.3-liter V8 as the engine is now capable of running on E85 ethanol. On normal gasoline, it produces 320 hp (239 kW) and 335 lb⋅ft (454 N⋅m) of torque, whereas on E85, its output rises to 326 hp (243 kW) and 348 lb⋅ft (472 N⋅m) of torque, up from 310 hp (231 kW) and 335 lb⋅ft (454 N⋅m) in 2009.

A 2007 Avalanche was given away to the Most Valuable Player of the 2006 Major League Baseball All-Star Game, Michael Young.

For the 2009 model year, a Bluetooth hands-free phone system was added to all Avalanche models, and was integrated with the vehicle's OnStar telematics system, and the 4L60-E four-speed automatic transmission was replaced with the 6L80-E unit for both engines.

Following the 2009 model year, the 6.0L V8 engine option was dropped from the Avalanche lineup (in addition to being discontinued from the related Chevrolet Suburban 1500 and Chevrolet Tahoe), leaving the standard 5.3L V8 as the Avalanche's sole engine option.

=== Trim levels ===
The second-generation Avalanche came in three well-equipped trim levels:

- The LS served as the base model. Among the included features were 17-inch alloy wheels and tires, cloth seating surfaces, power front driver's bucket seat, OnStar telematics system, an AM/FM stereo with single-disc CD/MP3 player and auxiliary audio input jack with six speakers, keyless entry, and black door handles, tailgate handle, and side mirrors, aluminum interior trim, front and side airbags, traction control, and StabiliTrak. A Bluetooth hands-free phone system was added starting with the 2009 model year.
- The LT served as the mid-level model. It added power dual front bucket seats, remote start, XM Satellite Radio, Bluetooth hands-free telephone system, and exterior color-keyed door handles, tailgate handle, and side mirrors, wood interior trim, as well as other features. Later models also included leather seating surfaces with heated front seats, and a Bose premium audio system with an amplifier and subwoofer. A Bluetooth hands-free phone system was added starting with the 2009 model year.
- The LTZ was the top-of-the-line model. It added leather seating surfaces, security alarm, an AM/FM stereo with six-disc CD/MP3/DVD changer, an eight-speaker premium Bose CenterPoint amplified surround sound system, memory for the front driver's seat, 20-inch polished alloy wheels and tires, and rear seat audio and video system controls, and the trim-exclusive self-leveling Auto Ride suspension. Later models also included a touchscreen GPS navigation system with SiriusXM Travel Link Services, and a rear backup camera system. A Bluetooth hands-free phone system was added starting with the 2009 model year.

=== Black Diamond Edition ===
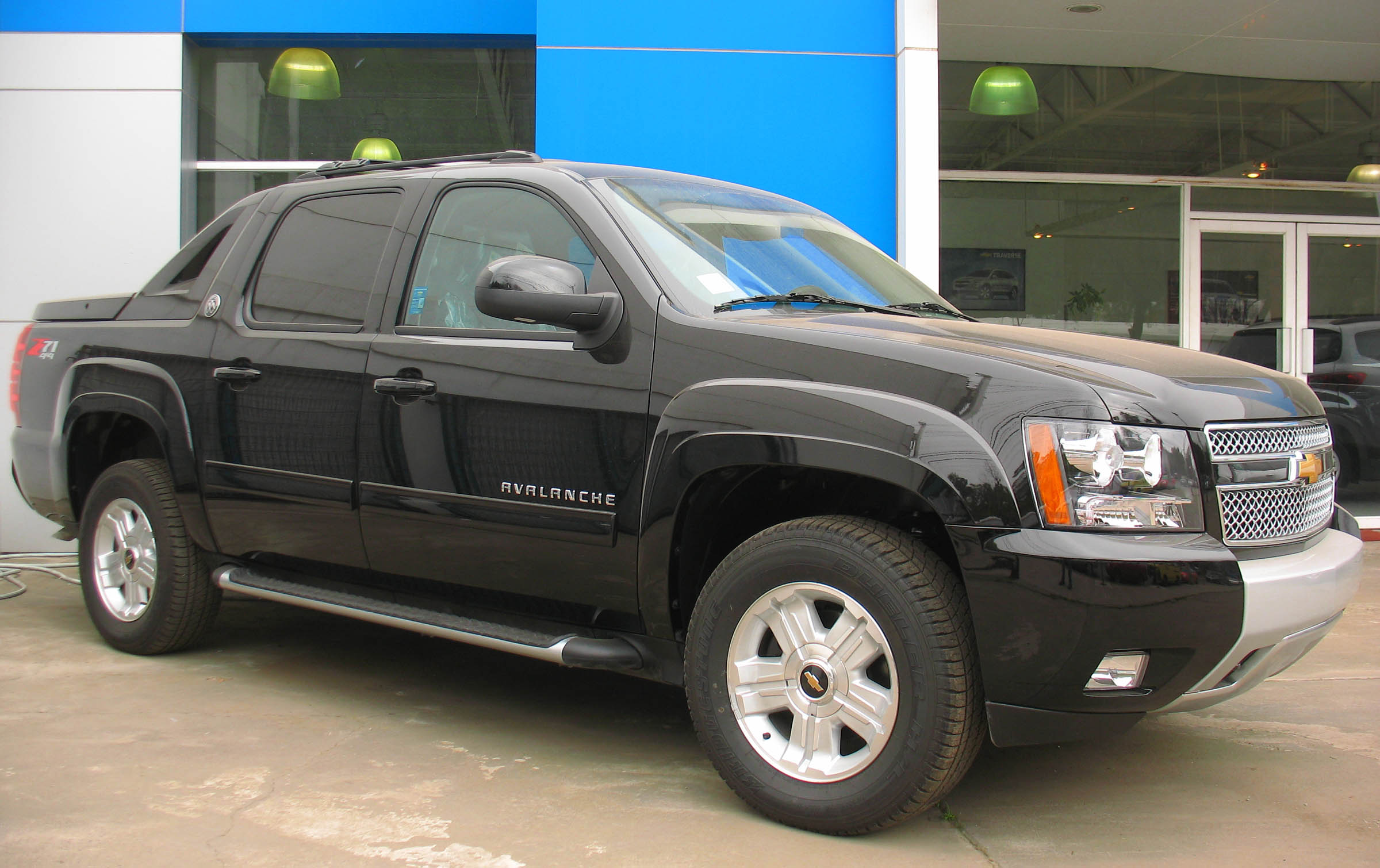
2013 Avalanche Z71 Black Diamond; the last edition.

For the 2013 model year, all three trim levels of the Avalanche were sold as special-edition Black Diamond Edition models to commemorate the final year of production. While options and packages were virtually unchanged from the 2012 model year, all 2013 Avalanches received special "Black Diamond Edition" badging on the rear pillars and rear tailgate, and buyers also received a personalized coffee table book shipped to them after purchase that included a copy of their Avalanche's window sticker, as well as a letter from Chevrolet congratulating them on their purchase. The book included information about the development of the original 2002 Chevrolet Avalanche, as well as "behind-the-scenes" photos from Silao Assembly showing the Avalanche being assembled, and Avalanche owners' photos of their trucks.

=== Discontinuation ===
Production of the Avalanche ended after the 2013 model year, after 2011 saw a sales decline of 2.6% to 20,088 units. Production of the Cadillac Escalade EXT also ended after the 2013 model year.

== Awards ==
- 2002 – Motor Trend Truck of the Year
- 2007 – Best New Pickup by Automotive Journalists Association of Canada
- 2010 – J.D. Power Highest initial quality large light-duty pickup
- 2013 – J.D. Power Highest initial quality large light-duty pickup
- 2020 – Consumer Reports No. 6 on CR's 10 Most Reliable Used Pickups (2012-2013 model years)

== Sales ==
Calendar Year	U.S.	Mexico
2001	52,955	
2002	89,372	
2003	93,482	
2004	80,566	
2005	63,186	389
2006	57,076	1,240
2007	55,550	1,915
2008	35,003	1,007
2009	16,432	697
2010	20,515	437
2011	20,088	184
2012	23,995	98
2013	16,986	39
