= Hummer H2 =

Large SUV built by AM General and marketed by General Motors

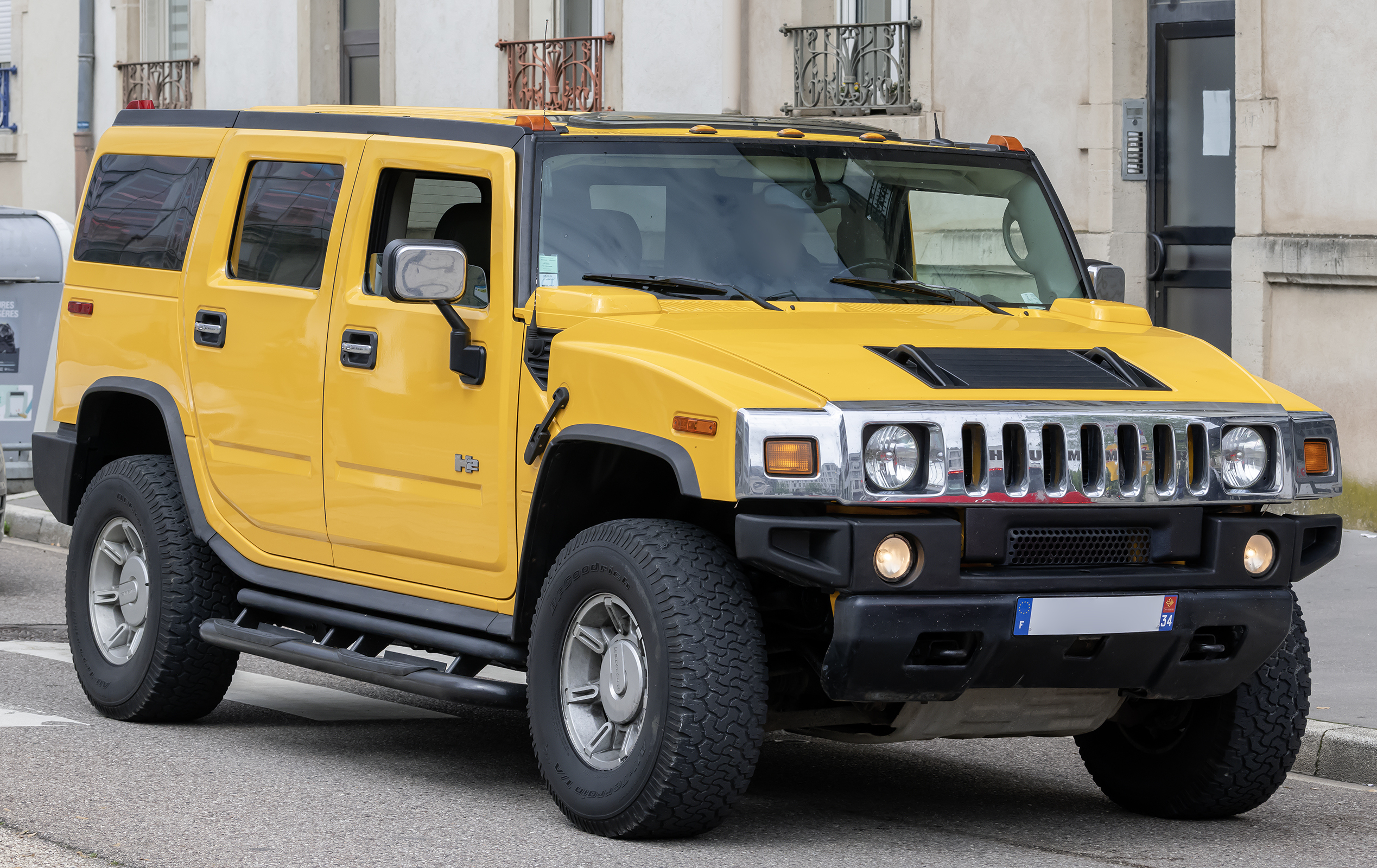

Overview
- Manufacturer: AM General under contract from General Motors
- Production: 2002–2009
- Model years: 2003–2009
- Assembly: United States: Mishawaka, Indiana; Russia: Kaliningrad (Avtotor)

Body and chassis
- Class: Full-size SUV; Full-size pickup truck
- Body style: 5-door SUV; 5-door pickup truck
- Layout: Front engine, four-wheel drive
- Platform: GMT825
- Related: Chevrolet Silverado/GMC Sierra; Chevrolet Avalanche/Cadillac Escalade EXT; Chevrolet Tahoe/GMC Yukon; Chevrolet Suburban/GMC Yukon XL; Cadillac Escalade/Cadillac Escalade ESV

Powertrain
- Engine: 6.0 L LQ4 V8 (2003–2007) 6.2 L L92 V8; (2008–2009)
- Transmission: 4-speed 4L60E automatic (2002–2004); 4-speed 4L65E automatic (2005–2007); 6-speed 6L80E automatic; (2008–2009)

Dimensions
- Wheelbase: 122.8 in (3,119 mm)
- Length: 203.5 in (5,169 mm) (with spare tire carrier); 189.8 in (4,821 mm) (without spare tire carrier)
- Width: 81.3 in (2,065 mm)
- Height: 2002–2003: 77.8 in (1,976 mm); 2004–2009: 79.0 in (2,007 mm)
- Curb weight: 6,400 lb (2,903 kg) - 6.0 L; 6,614 lb (3,000 kg) - 6.2 L

The Hummer H2 is a full-size off-road SUV that was marketed by Hummer and built in the AM General facility under contract from General Motors from 2002 until 2009. It is based on a modified GMT820 GM three-quarter-ton pickup truck in the front and a half-ton 1500 frame in the rear. A four-door pickup truck version with a midgate that opens the vehicle's interior to the external cargo bed was introduced for the 2005 model year as the H2 SUT (sport utility truck).

== Background ==
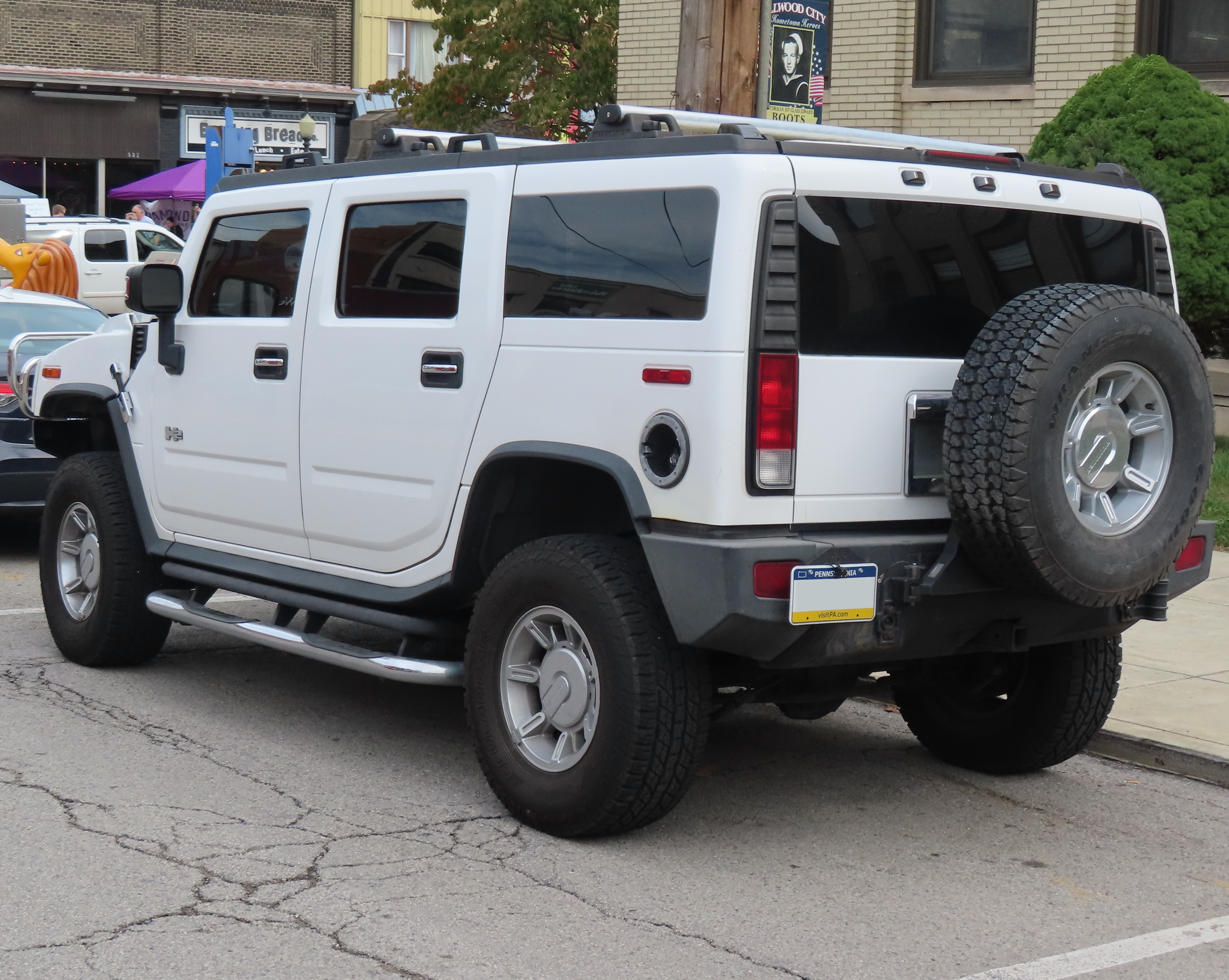
Hummer H2 SUV

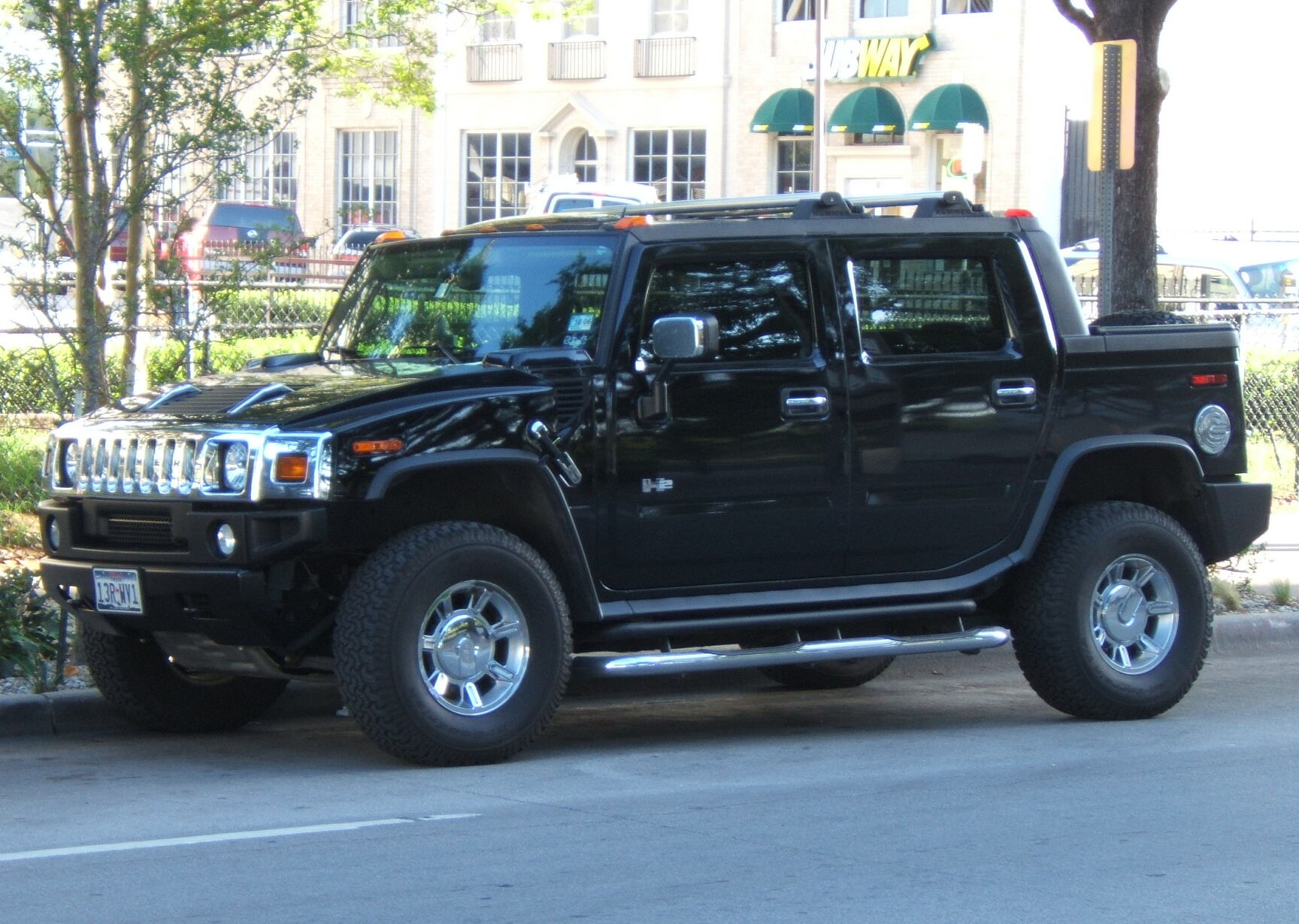
Hummer H2 SUT

In 2001 and 2002, GM allowed journalists to examine early versions of the Hummer H2, which were still under development.

The H2 was built by AM General under contract with General Motors at AM General Commercial Assembly Plant in Mishawaka, Indiana.

== Features ==
=== Standard ===
Standard features included air conditioning with tri-zone climate controls, an adjustable, leather-wrapped steering wheel with radio controls, cruise control, leather upholstery, heated front, and rear seats, 8-way power front seats, dual memory system, BOSE premium sound system, single-CD/cassette player and later in 2004, a six-disc CD changer, then in 2007, a single CD-player with MP3 capability, an auxiliary input jack and DVD player, outside-temperature indicator, compass, rear radio controls, independent front torsion bar suspension, rear five-link coil spring suspension developed for the H2, oversized tires with wheels scripted "HUMMER", universal garage door opener and remote engine start (2007 and 2009).

=== Optional ===
Options for the H2 include adjustable rear suspension (which is included within the Adventure Package), a broad power sunroof, rearview camera, DVD entertainment system, navigation system, ladder, custom grilles, side step bars, Air compressor with road assistance kit, and 20" chrome wheels (slightly different from stock wheels).

== 2008 updates ==
For 2008, the Hummer H2 and H2 SUT received an update. While essentially unchanged on the exterior, the H2 and H2 SUT interiors were redesigned. This included a new instrument cluster with improved gauges and Driver Information Center (DIC) based on the higher-trim GMT900 trucks/SUVs, a new leather-wrapped steering wheel, three new radios with a Bose premium audio system and auxiliary audio inputs (including a new touchscreen GPS navigation radio with DVD audio and video playback while the transmission is in the park position, and XM Nav-Traffic capabilities), a new rear seat DVD entertainment system, Bluetooth hands-free calling capabilities, enhanced voice activation, new OnStar hardware with buttons moved from the rearview mirror to the overhead console, a lower dashboard-mounted radio, new dual-zone climate controls, new rear seat audio system controls, a new dash-mounted control knob for the 4X4 system to replace the old pushbutton controls, brushed aluminum interior trim panels, new interior color options, available remote engine start, and a center dashboard-mounted analog clock.

Also for 2008, a new 393 hp (293 kW) 6.2 L V8 gasoline engine replaced the previous 325 hp (242 kW) 6.0 L, with a new 6L80-E six-speed automatic transmission, replacing the 4L65-E four-speed automatic.

Hummer launched a special 2009 Black Chrome Limited Edition featuring a new paint color, Sedona Metallic. All Black Chrome editions also had Sedona interior, black chrome accents instead of standard chrome, and unique 20-inch black chrome wheels. Initially, there were supposed to be 1,000 to 1,300 Black Chrome editions. However, due to the mid-year production shutdown, only six were ever actually made, and they were not made available to the public.

== Fuel economy ==
General Motors was not required to provide official fuel economy ratings for the H2 due to the vehicle's heavy gross vehicle weight rating (GVWR). Prior to 2011, the United States Environmental Protection Agency (EPA) exempted vehicles with a GVWR over 8,500 lb (3,900 kg) from fuel economy standards and testing.

Publisher	Observation
Motor Trend	10 mpg_{‑US} (24 L/100 km; 12 mpg_{‑imp}) / 4.3 km/l
Car and Driver	10 mpg_{‑US} (24 L/100 km; 12 mpg_{‑imp}) / 4.3 km/l
About.com	9 mpg_{‑US} (26 L/100 km; 11 mpg_{‑imp}) / 3.8 km/l
Edmunds	9.2 mpg_{‑US} (26 L/100 km; 11.0 mpg_{‑imp}) / 3.9 km/l
Four Wheeler	10.8 mpg_{‑US} (22 L/100 km; 13.0 mpg_{‑imp}) / 4.6 km/l

== Yearly American sales ==
Calendar Year	Total American sales
2002	18,861
2003	34,529
2004	29,898
2005	33,140
2006	17,472
2007	12,431
2008	6,095
2009	1,513
Total	153,026
