= GMT T1XX platform =

GMT T1XX
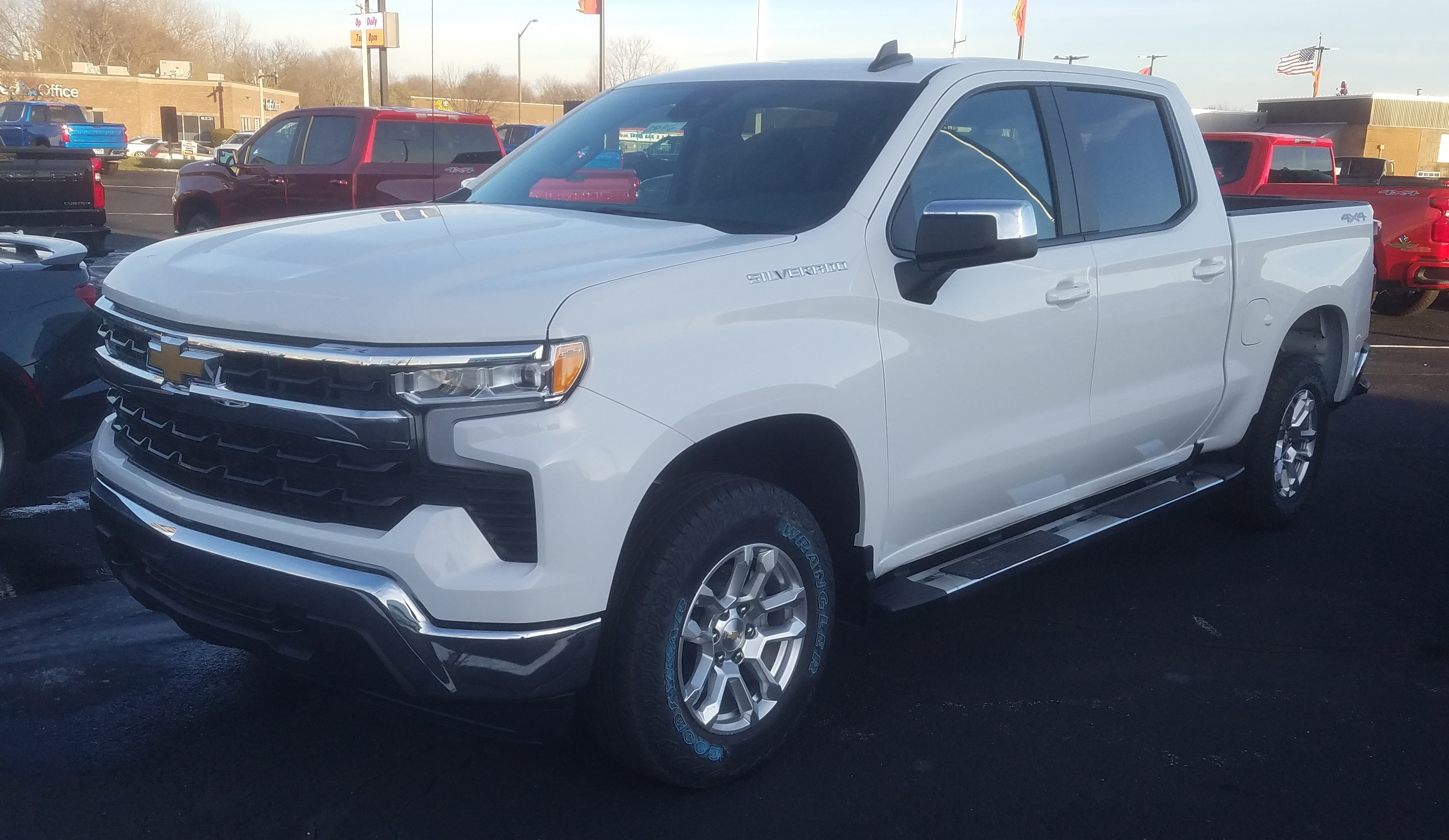

Overview
- Manufacturer: General Motors
- Production: July 2018–present (Trucks); January 2020-present (Extended length SUVs); May 18, 2020-present (SUVs)

Body and chassis
- Class: Full-size pickup truck/SUV
- Layout: FR/4X4 (4WD)
- Body styles: 4-door SUV; 4-door extended SUV; 2-door pickup truck 4-door pickup truck

Powertrain
- Engines: 2.7L Turbo gas I-4, 3.0L turbo diesel I-6, 5.3L V8, 6.2L V8, 6.6L V8, 6.6L turbo diesel V8
- Transmissions: 6-speed, 8-speed, 10-speed

Dimensions
- Wheelbase: 134–139.6 in

Chronology
- Predecessor: GMT K2XX

The GMT T1XX is the assembly code for a vehicle platform architecture developed by General Motors for its line of full-size trucks and large SUVs that has been announced to start production in the fall of 2018 for the 2019 model year. The "XX" is a placeholder for the last two digits of the specific assembly code for each model. As an example, the project code for the Suburban is T1YC. The platform replaced the GMT K2XX series that was introduced in April 2013 for the trucks, followed by the December 2013 production of large SUVs.

The vehicles are expected to make some use of aluminum body panels as a weight-saving measure.

Production of the pickups was introduced in January 2018 with a preview of the 2019 model year Chevrolet Silverado, followed by GM's full-size sport-utility vehicles that were introduced in 2019 for the 2021 model year that went on sale in the spring of 2020. In line with GM's plan to reduce its total number of platforms to four by 2025, the T1XX platform is also expected to include an eventual replacement for the current model of Chevrolet Express which has been in production since 1995 based on the GMT 600 platform.

== Vehicles ==
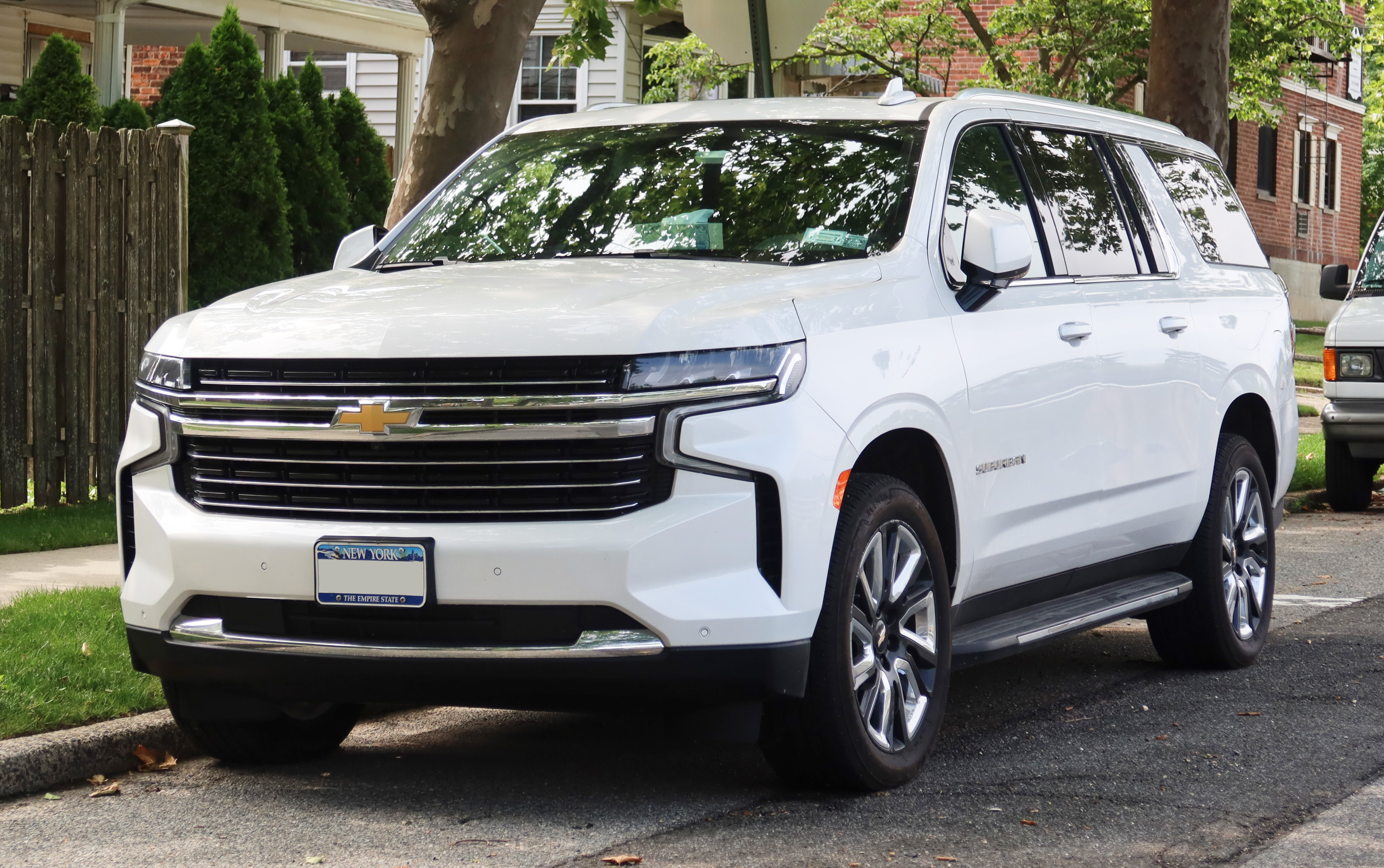
2021 Chevrolet Suburban

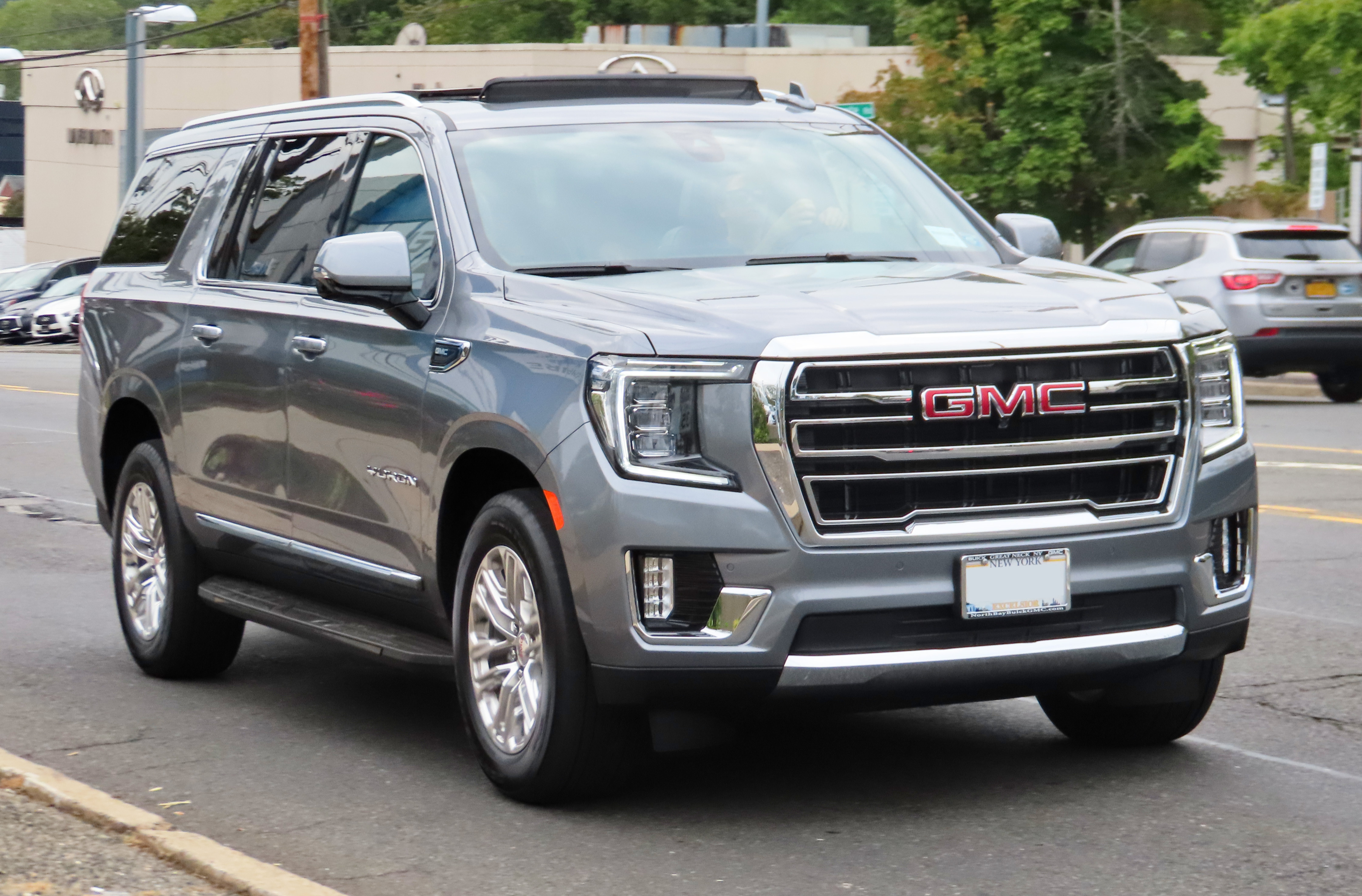
2021 GMC Yukon XL

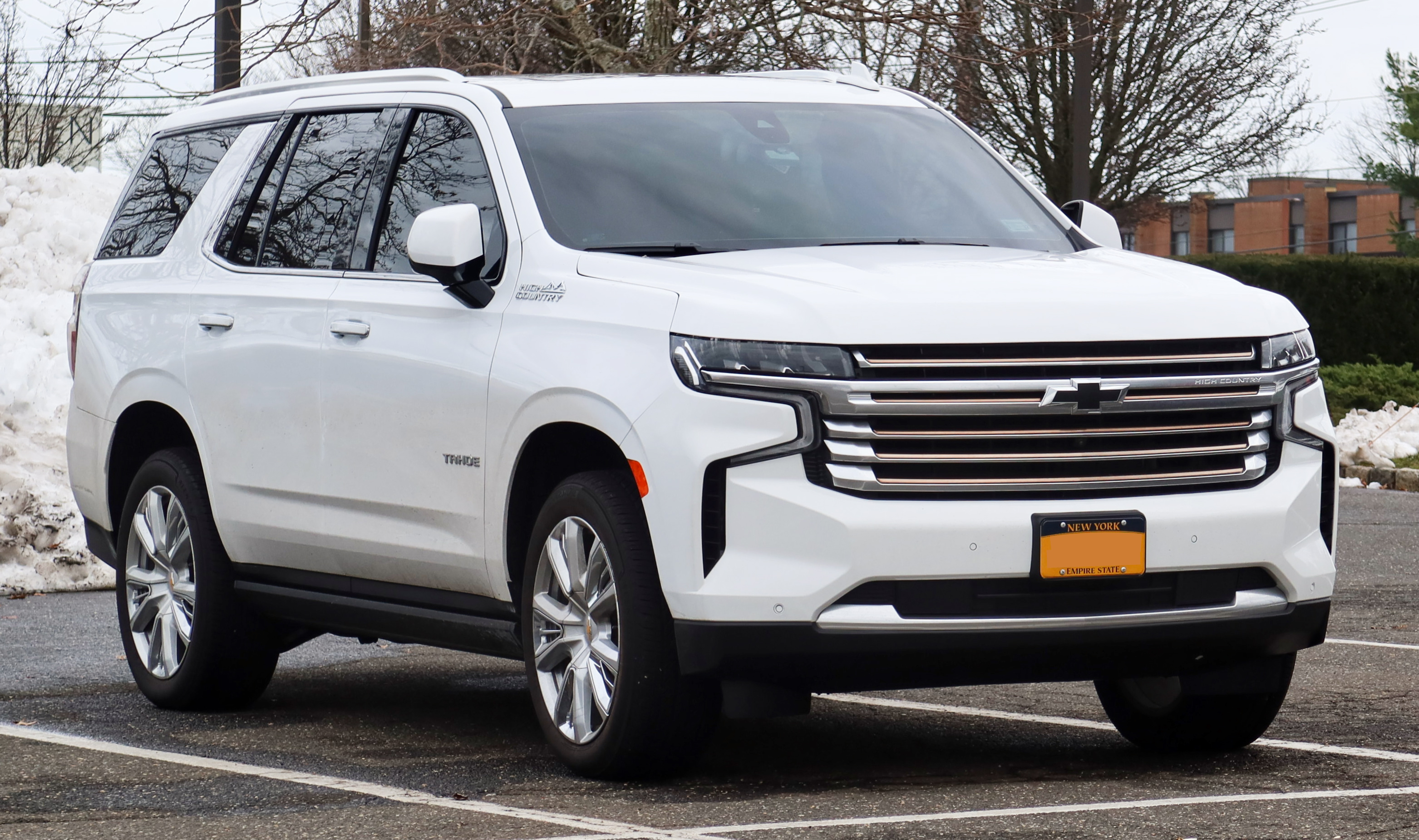
2021 Chevrolet Tahoe

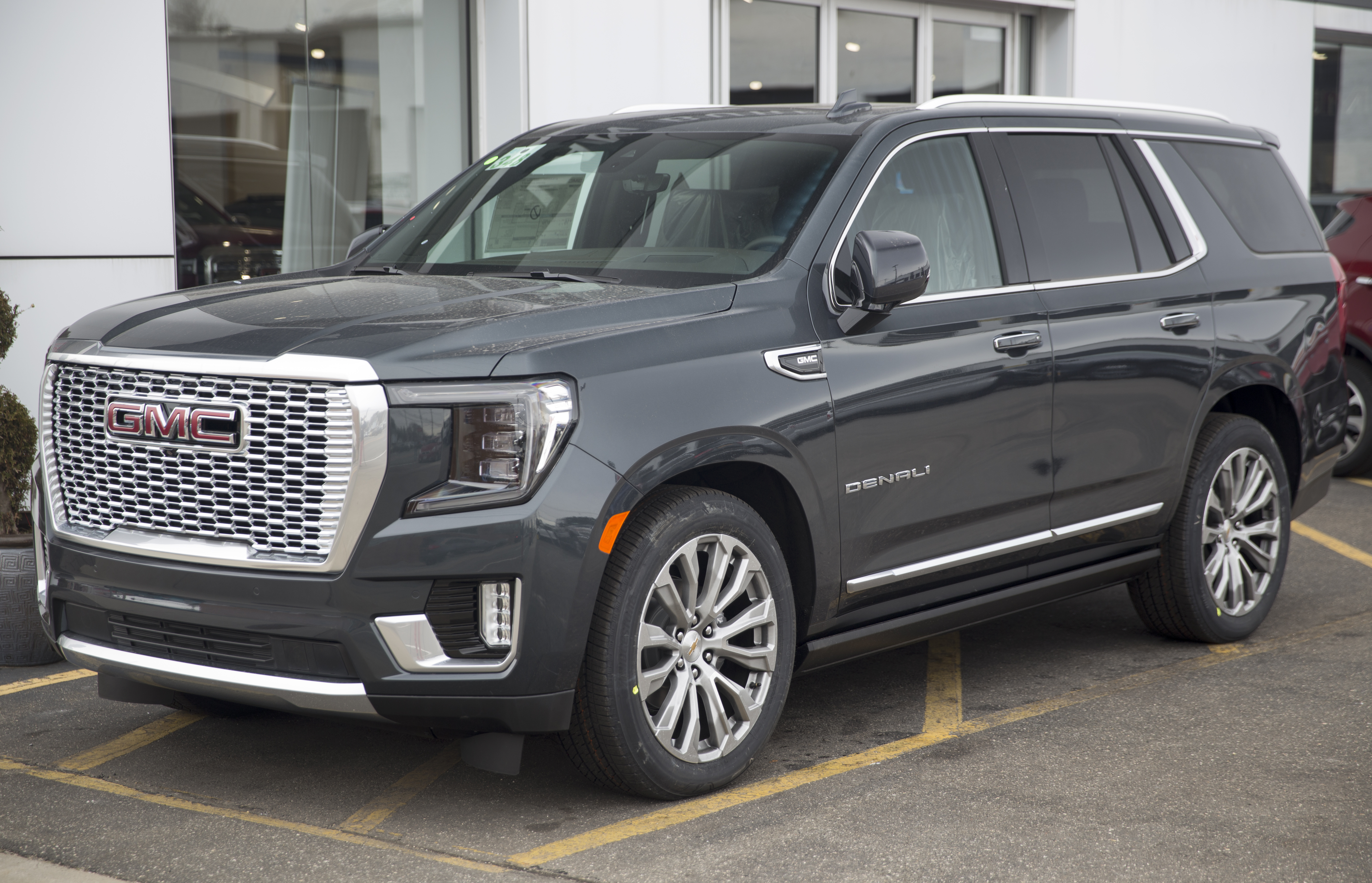
2021 GMC Yukon

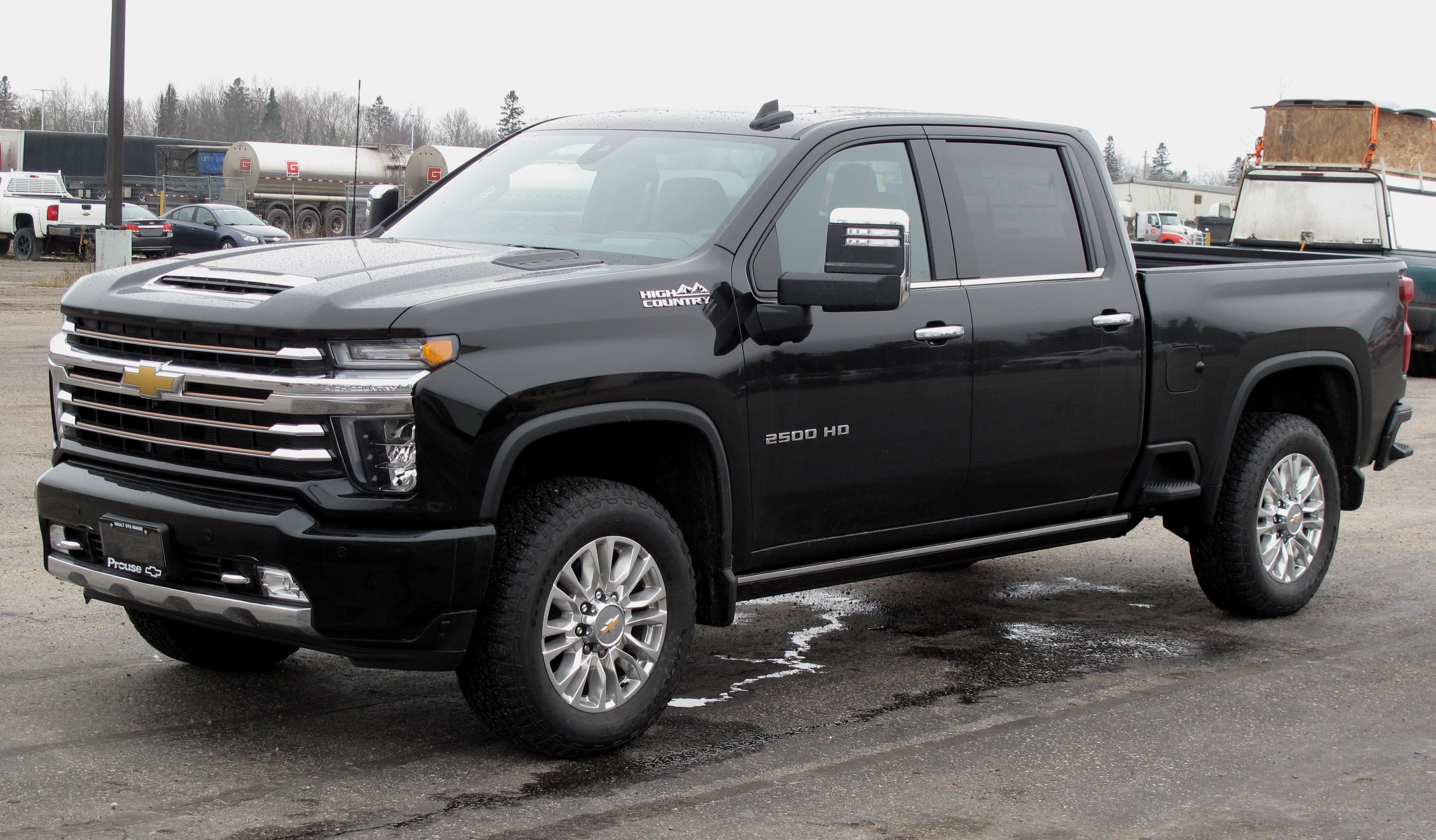
2020 Chevrolet Silverado HD

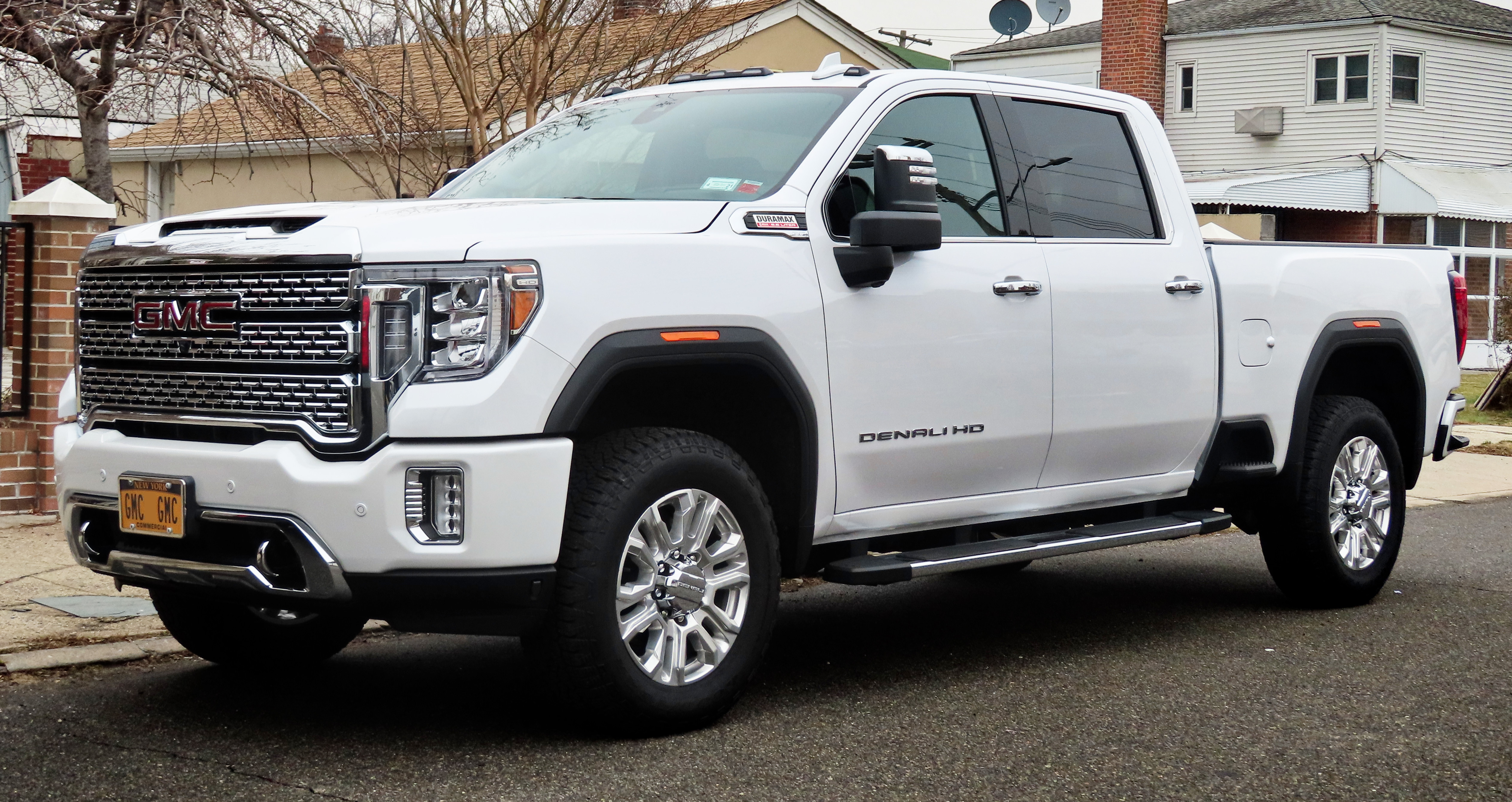
2020 GMC Sierra HD

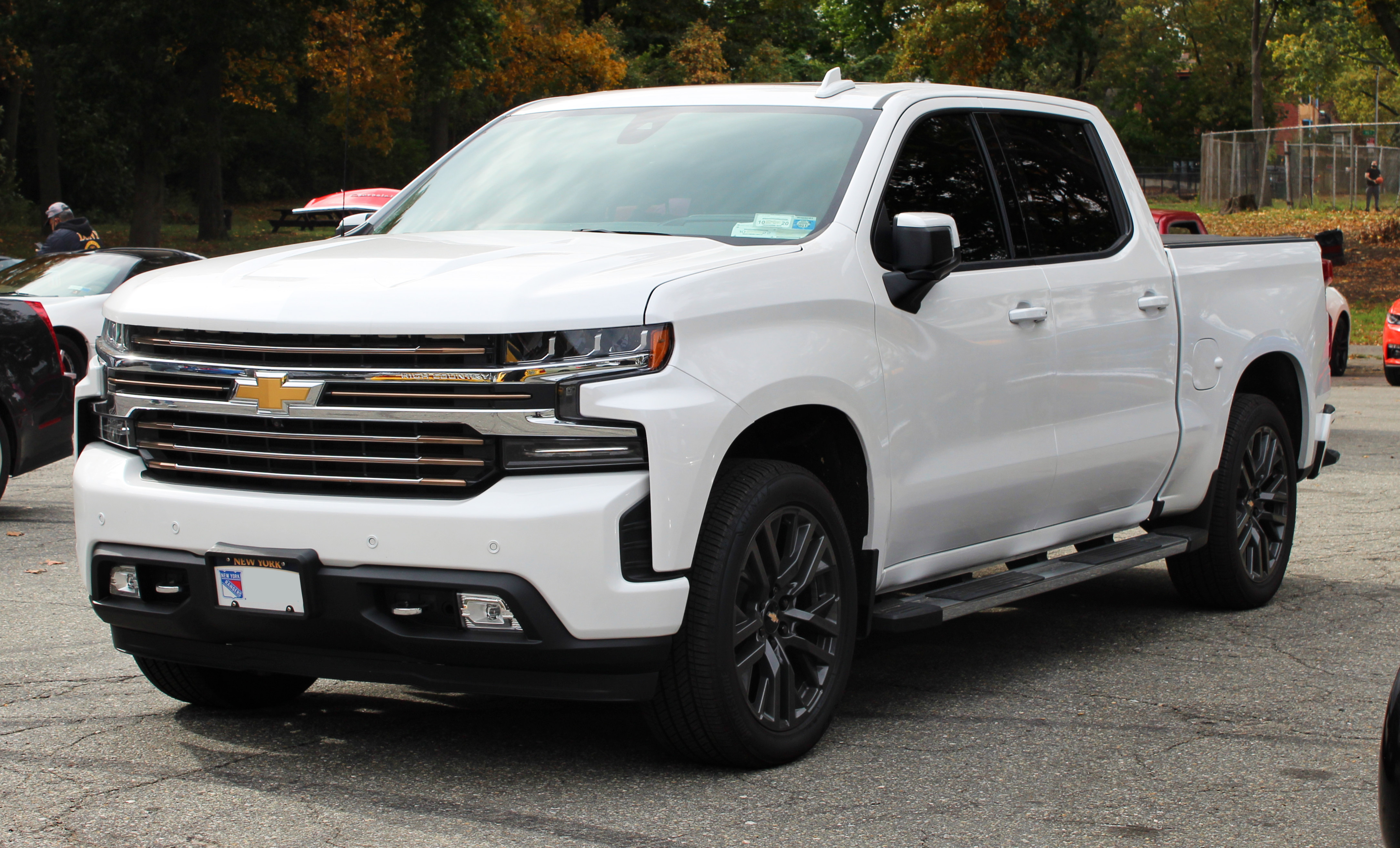
2020 Chevrolet Silverado

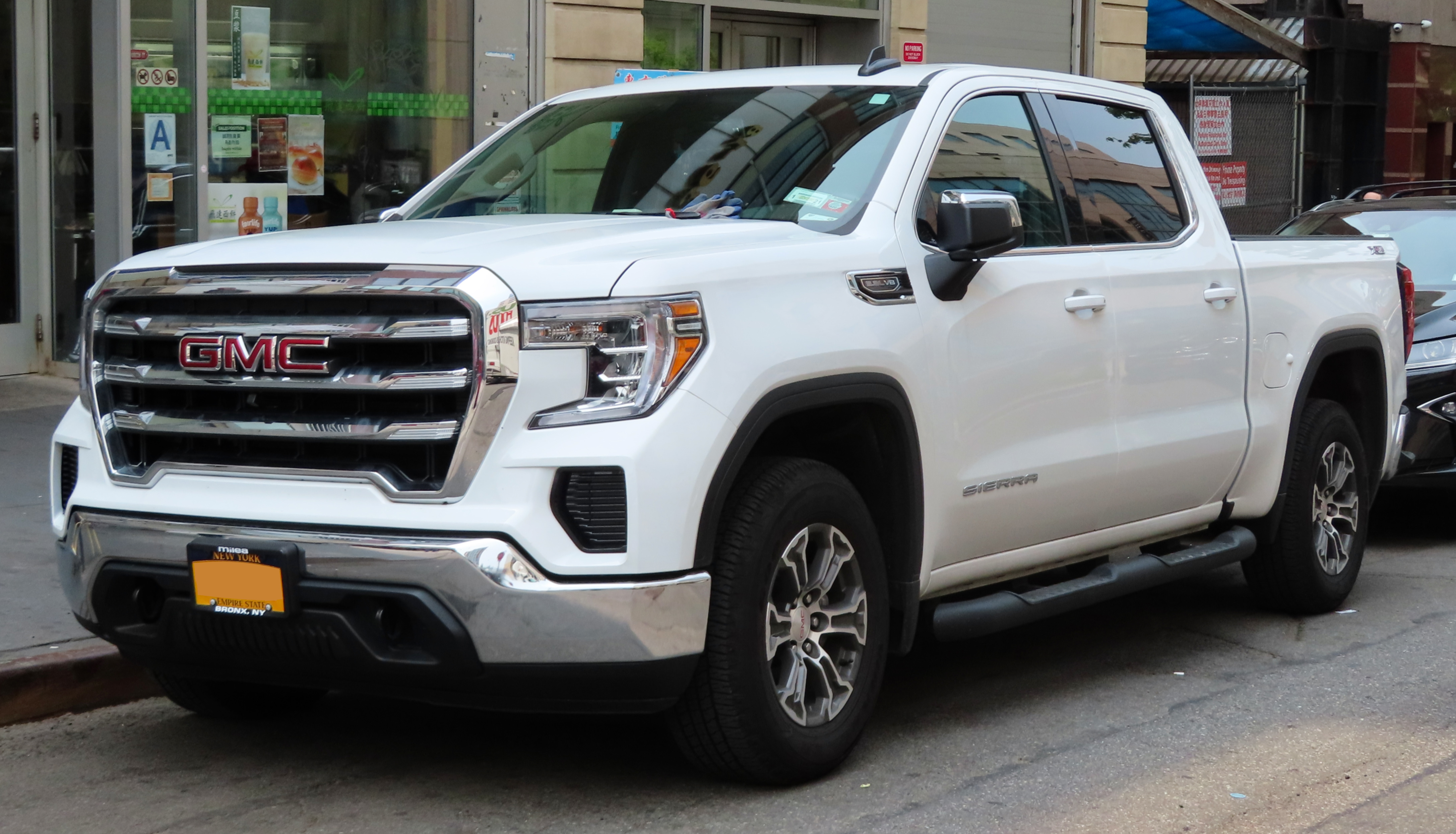
2019 GMC Sierra

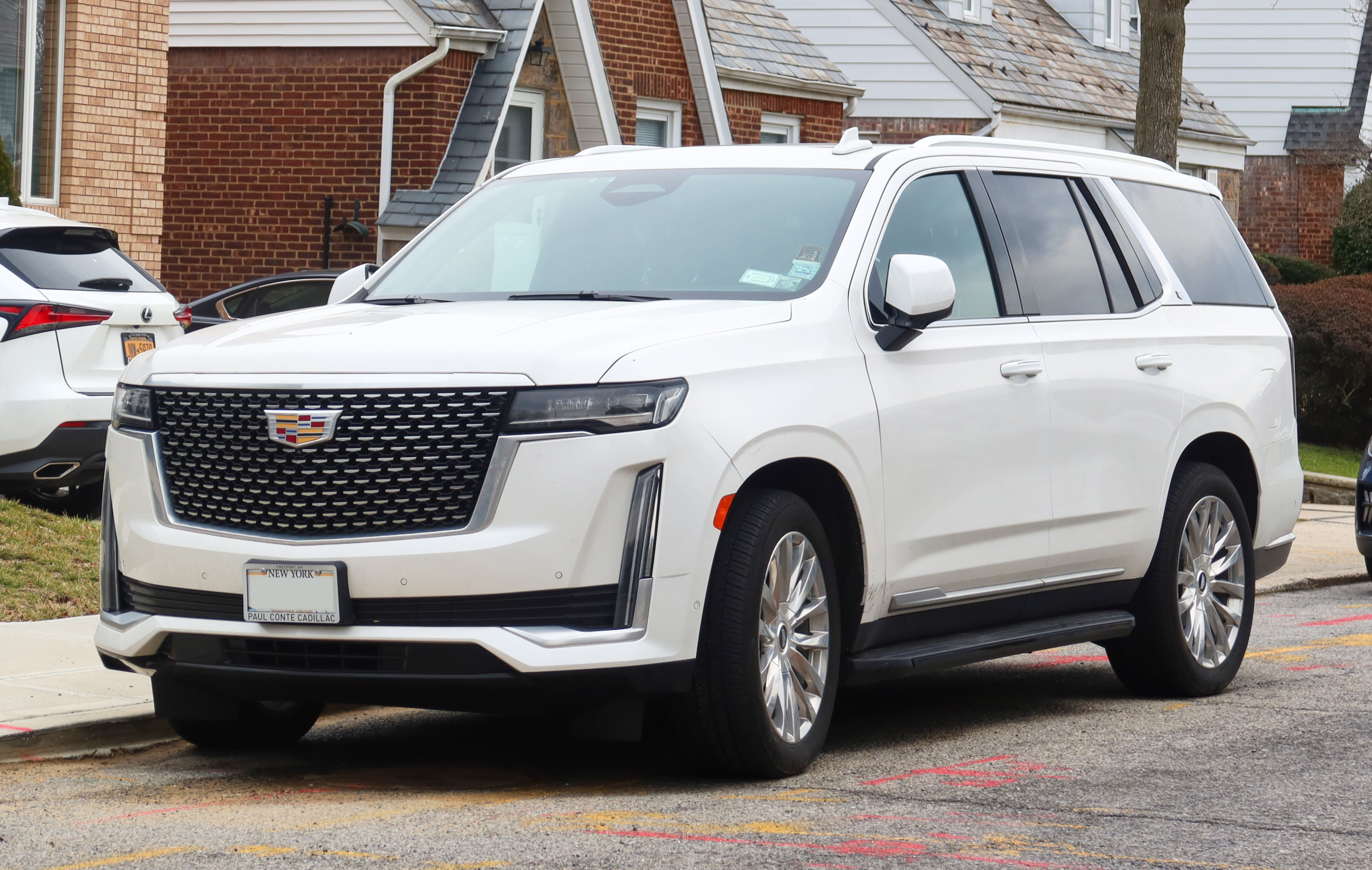
2021 Cadillac Escalade

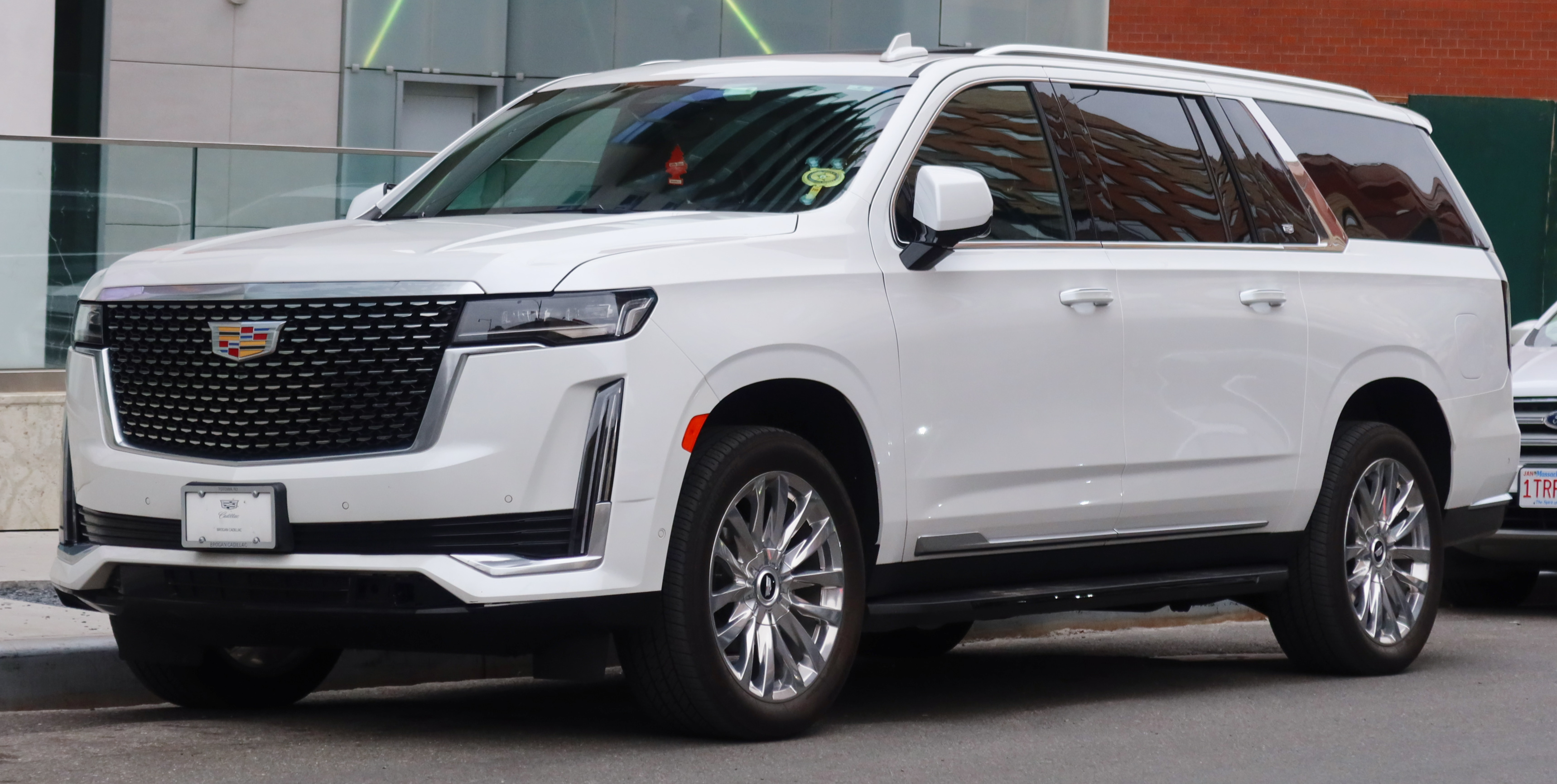
2021 Cadillac Escalade ESV

Basic platform	Years	Model	Notes	Code	Introduction	Production	Sale
GMT1XX	2019-	Chevrolet Silverado	Regular Cab; Double Cab; Crew Cab	GMT1RC; GMT1EC; GMT1CC	January 2018	Silao; Fort Wayne; Flint	Fall 2018
GMT1XX	2019-	GMC Sierra	Regular Cab; Double Cab; Crew Cab	GMT1RG; GMT1EG; GMT1CG	January 2018	Silao; Fort Wayne; Flint	Fall 2018
GMT1XX	2019-	Chevrolet Silverado HD	Regular Cab; Double Cab; Crew Cab	GMT1HC	January 2018	Silao; Fort Wayne; Flint	June 2019
GMT1XX	2019-	GMC Sierra HD	Regular Cab; Double Cab; Crew Cab	GMT1HG	January 2018	Silao; Fort Wayne; Flint	June 2019
GMT1XX	2020-	Chevrolet Tahoe	4-door SUV	GMT1UC	December 10, 2019	Arlington December 2019	Spring 2020
GMT1XX	2020-	GMC Yukon	4-door SUV	GMT1UG	January 14, 2020	Arlington December 2019	Summer 2020
GMT1XX	2020-	Cadillac Escalade	4-door SUV	GMT1UL	February 4, 2020	Arlington December 2019	Fall 2020
GMT1XX	2020-	Chevrolet Suburban	4-door extended SUV	GMT1YC	December 10, 2019	Arlington December 2019	Spring 2020
GMT1XX	2020-	GMC Yukon XL	4-door extended SUV	GMT1YG	January 14, 2020	Arlington December 2019	Summer 2020
GMT1XX	2020-	Cadillac Escalade ESV	4-door extended SUV	GMT1YL	April 2020	Arlington December 2019	Fall 2020

== See also ==
- List of General Motors platforms
