= Fort Wayne Assembly =

Automobile factory in Roanoke, Indiana, U.S.

- Operated: 1986–present
- Location: 12200 Lafayette Center Road; Roanoke, Indiana, United States
- Coordinates: 40.9631°N 85.2989°W
- Industry: Automotive
- Products: Pickup trucks
- Employees: 4,360 (2022)
- Area: 716 acres (2.90 km^{2})
- Volume: 4,600,000 sq ft (430,000 m^{2})
- Owner: General Motors

Fort Wayne Assembly is an automobile factory in Roanoke, Indiana. Opened in 1986 by General Motors, the 4,600,000 sq ft (430,000 m^{2}) plant produces vehicles on the company's GMT T1XX vehicle platform. Facilities include 2 body shops, a paint shop, general assembly, and a sequence center. It assumed operations of the former Pontiac Truck and Bus Assembly. The factory is located at 12200 Lafayette Center Rd, Roanoke, IN 46783.

On May 30, 2023, the plant built its 10 millionth vehicle, a white 2023 GMC Sierra Denali.

== Vehicles produced ==
=== Current ===
- Chevrolet Silverado 1500 (1998–present)
- GMC Sierra 1500 (1986–present)

=== Previous ===
- Chevrolet C/K (1986–1998)
- Chevrolet Silverado HD (Regular & Double Cab) (2014–2018)
- GMC Sierra HD (Regular & Double Cab) (2014–2018)
