= List of General Motors platforms =

The American-based international automotive conglomerate General Motors (GM) underpins its many vehicle models with various platforms. These platforms are established sets of axles, suspensions, and steering mechanisms which fit various bodies and powertrains from various marques that GM owns.

From the early twentieth century, a Latin letter-based naming scheme was used to designate platforms, which were aimed at vehicles under different brands that served similar niches of the market. For example, the B platform was the base for fullsize, rear-wheel drive (RWD) sedans and wagons from 1926 to 1996. This platform underpinned vehicles made by Buick, Cadillac, Chevrolet, Marquette, Pontiac, and Oldsmobile. During the 1970s and 1980s, GM introduced many new front-wheel drive (FWD) platforms for the first time, such as the FWD C platform introduced in 1985. Despite being mechanically very new and different, it kept the same name as the RWD C platform for the sake of consistency, as most of the models remained the same, such as the Oldsmobile 98. For most of these platforms, the platform name is the fourth character of a vehicle's VIN, with a notable exception being trucks, for which it is the fifth character.

At the outset of the twenty-first century, General Motors' approach to platforms changed, and so did the nomenclature they use. Platforms themselves are now referred to by GM as "architectures", and are now named according to the English-language names of letters from the Greek alphabet, such as the subcompact Gamma platform. Today, many of the since-discontinued Latin letter platforms are informally called "bodies", such as "J-body", which refers to the J platform. In the 2010s, GM once again began to change platform nomenclature, this time to a four-character format: platform-generation-XX. An example of this is the D2XX, from the second generation of the Delta platform, hence the "D" and "2".

All but three platforms listed here use a front-mounted engine, and those exceptions are noted in the 'layout' column.

== In production ==
As of April 2020, GM produces cars, trucks, and sport utility vehicles (SUVs) of multiple different sizes on 19 different platforms: 7 of which are inherently RWD, with the rest being FWD. All but 5 of these have four-wheel drive variants as well.

Example Image	Name	Layout	Introduced	Vehicles Underpinned	Notes
2020 Cadillac CT5	Alpha II	RWD/AWD	2019	2020–present Cadillac CT4; 2020–present Cadillac CT5	The successor to the Alpha I platform.
2024 Chevrolet Blazer EV	BEV3	FWD/RWD/AWD	2022	2023–2025 Buick Electra E4; 2023–present Buick Electra E5; 2024–present Cadillac Celestiq; 2022–present Cadillac Lyriq; 2024–present Cadillac Optiq; 2025–present Cadillac Vistiq; 2023–present Chevrolet Blazer EV; 2024–present Chevrolet Equinox EV	The successor to the BEV2 platform.
2024 Chevrolet Silverado EV	BT1	FWD/RWD/AWD	2021	2021–present GMC Hummer EV; 2023–present GMC Sierra EV; 2023–present Chevrolet Silverado EV; 2024–present Cadillac Escalade IQ	
2019 Chevrolet Blazer	C1XX	FWD/AWD	2017	2017–present Cadillac XT5; 2017–2023 GMC Acadia; 2018–2020 Holden Acadia; 2018–2024 Buick Enclave; 2018–2025 Chevrolet Traverse; 2019–present Chevrolet Blazer; 2020–present Cadillac XT6	A crossover-focused derivative of the E2XX platform.
2017 Vauxhall Insignia	E2XX	FWD/AWD	2016	2016–2025 Chevrolet Malibu; 2017–2020 Holden Commodore; 2017–2022 Opel Insignia; 2017–2022 Vauxhall Insignia; 2017–present Buick Regal; 2019–present Cadillac XT4; 2021–present Buick Envision; 2023–present Cadillac GT4	The successor to the Epsilon II platform.
2017 Chevrolet Sonic	Gamma II	FWD/AWD	2010	2010–2015 Chevrolet Spark; 2010–2015 Holden Barina Spark; 2010–2014 Chevrolet Sail; 2011–2020 Chevrolet Sonic; 2011–present Chevrolet Cobalt; 2011–2018 Holden Barina; 2012–present Chevrolet Spin; 2013–2020 Chevrolet Trax; 2013–2019 Opel Mokka; 2013–2022 Buick Encore; 2013–2019 Chevrolet Prisma; 2013–2019 Chevrolet Onix; 2016–2022 Ravon R2	This generation of the Gamma platform is the first to have been developed by GM Korea, as the first generation was developed by Opel. Also used for the GMC Granite and Cadillac Urban Luxury concept cars.
2019 Chevrolet Tracker	GEM	FWD	2016	2016–2023 Chevrolet Sail; 2018–2023 Buick Excelle; 2019–present Chevrolet Tracker; 2019–present Chevrolet Onix; 2020–2022 Buick Encore	A new low-cost platform focused on developing market regions, designed by Pan Asia Technical Automotive Center, GM's joint development center with SAIC. Also called Global Emerging Markets.
2016 GMC Canyon	GMT 31XX	RWD/AWD	2012	2013–present Chevrolet Colorado; 2012–2020 Holden Colorado; 2012–present Isuzu D-Max; 2012–2025 Chevrolet D-Max; 2012–present Chevrolet S10	Also called the GMT 700 platform.
2012 GMC Savana	GMT 610	RWD/AWD	2003	2003–present Chevrolet Express; 2003–present GMC Savana; 2003–present Chevrolet Savana	Mechanically very similar to its predecessor, the GMT 600 platform.
2019 Chevrolet SIlverado	GMT T1XX platform	RWD/AWD	2018	2019–present Chevrolet Silverado; 2019–present GMC Sierra; 2019–present GMC Sierra 2500; 2019–present Chevrolet Silverado 2500; 2019–present GMC Sierra 3500; 2019–present Chevrolet SIlverado 3500; 2020–present Chevrolet Tahoe; 2020–present GMC Yukon; 2020–present Chevrolet Suburban; 2020–present Cadillac Escalade; 2020–present Cadillac Escalade ESV; 2020–present GMC Yukon XL	The successor to the GMT K2XX platform.
2019 Chevrolet Monza	PATAC K	FWD	2015	2015–2023 Buick Excelle GT; 2016–2021 Chevrolet Cavalier; 2017–2023 Buick GL6; 2019–present Chevrolet Monza	A low-cost derivative of the D2XX platform designed by Pan Asia Technical Automotive Center, GM's joint development center with SAIC.
2018 Buick GL8	U IV	FWD/AWD	2010	2010–present Buick GL8	The successor to the U III platform. This platform remains in use solely for the GL8, which is sold only in China. It is the only one of GM's Latin-letter platforms still in use. Also called the SGM258 platform.
2020 Buick Encore GX	VSS-F	FWD/AWD	2019	2020–present Buick Encore GX; 2021–present Buick Verano Pro; 2022–present Buick Envista; 2022–present Buick GL8; 2023–present Buick LaCrosse; 2020–present Chevrolet Trailblazer; 2023–present Chevrolet Trax/Seeker; 2023–present Chevrolet Montana	The eventual consolidated successor to the Gamma II, G2XX, E2XX, D2XX, P2XX, PATAC K, U IV, GM4200, and GEM platforms. Slated to underpin all FWD GM cars plus subcompact crossovers by 2025.
2023 Cadillac CT6	VSS-R	RWD/AWD	2023	2023–present Cadillac CT6	The eventual consolidated successor to the Alpha and Omega platforms. Slated to underpin all RWD GM vehicles by 2025.
2025 Chevrolet Equinox	VSS-S	FWD/AWD	2024	2024–present Chevrolet Traverse; 2024–present Chevrolet Equinox; 2024–present Buick Enclave; 2024–present GMC Acadia; 2024–present GMC Terrain	The eventual consolidated successor to the D2XX and C1XX platforms. Slated to underpin all GM crossovers (excluding those on VSS-F) by 2025.
2023 Chevrolet Colorado	VSS-T	RWD/AWD	2023	2023–present Chevrolet Colorado; 2023–present GMC Canyon	The eventual consolidated successor to the GMT platforms. Slated to underpin all GM body-on-frame SUVs and trucks by 2025.
2020 Chevrolet Corvette	Y2XX	RWD/AWD	2020	2020–present Chevrolet Corvette	Indirect successor to the P I platform.

GM platform nomenclature guide

The GM nomenclature works as follows:
1st position is the platform:

- A – Alpha
- C – Chi
- D – Delta
- G – Gamma
- E – Epsilon
- P – Premium Epsilon (XTS)
- Y – Corvette (Y-body)
- L – Lambda
- K – Trucks

2nd position is the platform generation.
3rd position is the body style:

- A – Convertible
- B – Coupe
- S – Sedan
- J – Hatchback
- K – CUV?
- L – Long Wheel Base Sedan
- M – Minispace
- U – Crossover/CUV (5 seater)
- Y – SUV/Truck (7 seater)

4th position is the Brand:

- B – Buick
- C – Chevrolet
- G – GMC
- H – Holden
- L – Cadillac
- M – Citroën (partnership between GM & PSA)
- O – Opel/Vauxhall

5th position is an optional qualifier: for example the Sales market area:

- S – sales market China
- N – sales market North-America
- I – electric/hybrid

For example, E2UB-N is the Crossover Buick for the North-American market in the second generation of the Epsilon platform.

== Historical applications ==
As of April 2020, GM has produced cars, trucks, and SUVs of multiple different sizes on 107 different platforms: 55 of these with Latin letters, 12 with English spellings of Greek letters, and 40 others. Also, 64 of these platforms are inherently RWD, while the rest are primarily FWD. Furthermore, 50 of these have four-wheel drive variants as well.

=== Latin-letter platforms ===
Example Image	Name	Layout	Introduced	Ended	Vehicles Underpinned	Notes
1957 Chevrolet Task Force	A I	RWD	1923	1959	1923 – 1926 Chevrolet Superior; 1923 – 1931 GM Oakland; 1933 – 1942 Chevrolet Master; 1936 – 1939 Oldsmobile Series F; 1940 – 1948 Oldsmobile Series 60; 1941 – 1952 Chevrolet Deluxe; 1941 – 1947 Chevrolet A/K Series; 1941 – 1947 GMC A/K Series; 1946 – 1948 Chevrolet Stylemaster; 1946 – 1948 Chevrolet Fleetmaster; 1947 – 1955 Chevrolet Advance Design; 1947 – 1955 GMC New Design; 1949 – 1950 Oldsmobile 88; 1949 – 1949 Oldsmobile 76; 1949 – 1957 Pontiac Chieftain; 1950 – 1958 Pontiac Catalina; 1954 – 1957 Pontiac Star Chief; 1955 – 1959 Chevrolet Task Force Series; 1955 – 1959 GMC Blue Chip Series	The first use of a shared platform by GM.
1965 GM Beaumont	A II	RWD	1962	1969	1962 – 1969 GM Beaumont; 1964 – 1967 Buick Sport Wagon; 1964 – 1967 Buick Skylark; 1964 – 1969 Buick Special; 1964 – 1967 Chevrolet Chevelle; 1964 – 1967 Chevrolet El Camino; 1964 – 1967 Oldsmobile Vista Cruiser; 1964 – 1967 Oldsmobile 442; 1964 – 1967 Oldsmobile Cutlass; 1964 – 1967 Pontiac GTO; 1964 – 1967 Pontiac Tempest; 1964 – 1967 Pontiac LeMans; 1965 – 1967 Oldsmobile Cutlass Supreme	The successor to the A I platform.
1972 GMC Sprint	A III	RWD	1968	1972	1968 – 1972 Buick Skylark; 1968 – 1972 Buick Sport Wagon; 1968 – 1972 Chevrolet Chevelle; 1968 – 1972 Chevrolet El Camino; 1968 – 1972 Oldsmobile 442; 1968 – 1972 Oldsmobile Cutlass; 1968 – 1972 Oldsmobile Cutlass Supreme; 1968 – 1972 Oldsmobile Vista Cruiser; 1968 – 1972 Pontiac GTO; 1968 – 1970 Pontiac Tempest; 1968 – 1972 Pontiac LeMans; 1970 – 1972 Chevrolet Monte Carlo; 1971 – 1972 GMC Sprint	The successor to the A II platform.
1973 Buick Century	A IV	RWD	1973	1977	1973 – 1977 Buick Century; 1973 – 1977 Buick Regal; 1973 – 1977 Chevrolet Chevelle; 1973 – 1977 Chevrolet El Camino; 1973 – 1977 Chevrolet Monte Carlo; 1973 – 1977 GMC Sprint; 1973 – 1977 Oldsmobile 442; 1973 – 1977 Oldsmobile Cutlass; 1973 – 1977 Oldsmobile Cutlass Supreme; 1973 – 1975 Pontiac Grand Am; 1973 – 1977 Pontiac Grand Prix; 1973 – 1977 Pontiac LeMans; 1977 – 1977 Pontiac Can Am	The successor to the A III platform.
1980 Chevrolet Malibu	A V	RWD	1978	1981	1978 – 1981 Chevrolet Monte Carlo; 1978 – 1981 GMC Caballero; 1978 – 1981 Buick Century; 1978 – 1981 Buick Regal; 1978 – 1981 Chevrolet El Camino; 1978 – 1981 Chevrolet Malibu; 1978 – 1981 Oldsmobile Cutlass Supreme; 1978 – 1981 Oldsmobile Cutlass; 1978 – 1981 Pontiac LeMans; 1978 – 1981 Pontiac Grand Prix; 1978 – 1981 Pontiac Grand Am	The successor to the A IV platform. Vehicles remaining in production for 1982 were redesignated G platform.
1996 Oldsmobile Ciera	A VI	FWD	1982	1996	1982 – 1990 Chevrolet Celebrity; 1982 – 1991 Pontiac 6000; 1981 – 1995 Oldsmobile Cutlass Ciera; 1996 – 1996 Oldsmobile Ciera; 1982 – 1996 Buick Century	The successor to the A V platform.
1930 GM Marquette	B I	RWD	1926	1990	1926 – 1935 Buick Master Six; 1926 – 1935 Oldsmobile Six; 1929 – 1930 GM Marquette; 1929 – 1931 GM Viking; 1936 – 1958 Buick Century; 1936 – 1958 Buick Special; 1936 – 1939 Oldsmobile Series L; 1936 – 1938 Cadillac Series 60; 1936 – 1940 GM LaSalle; 1939 – 1951 Cadillac Series 61; 1939 – 1939 Oldsmobile Series G; 1940 – 1940 Oldsmobile Series 70; 1940 – 1940 Pontiac Deluxe; 1941 – 1950 Oldsmobile Series 76; 1941 – 1948 Oldsmobile Series 78; 1941 – 1942 Cadillac Series 63; 1942 – 1951 Pontiac Streamliner; 1949 – 1968 Oldsmobile 88; 1959 – 1972 Chevrolet Biscayne; 1959 – 1981 Pontiac Catalina; 1959 – 1981 Chevrolet Bel Air; 1959 – 1981 Pontiac Bonneville; 1959 – 1985 Chevrolet Impala; 1959 – 1986 Pontiac Parisienne; 1959 – 1962 Buick Invicta; 1959 – 1966 Pontiac Star Chief; 1959 – 1985 Buick LeSabre; 1959 – 1961 Chevrolet Nomad; 1959 – 1961 Chevrolet Parkwood; 1959 – 1961 Chevrolet Brookwood; 1960 – 1961 Pontiac Ventura; 1961 – 1966 Oldsmobile Starfire; 1962 – 1968 Pontiac Grand Prix; 1963 – 1970 Buick Wildcat; 1964 – 1965 Oldsmobile Jetstar; 1966 – 1990 Chevrolet Caprice; 1966 – 1966 Pontiac 2+2; 1967 – 1970 Pontiac Executive; 1969 – 1970 Chevrolet Kingswood; 1970 – 1970 Buick Estate; 1971 – 1975 Pontiac Grand Ville; 1971 – 1973 Buick Centurion; 1977 – 1978 Buick Riviera	The single longest-produced GM platform to date.
1993 Buick Roadmaster	B II	RWD	1991	1996	1991 – 1996 Buick Roadmaster; 1991 – 1996 Chevrolet Caprice; 1991 – 1992 Oldsmobile Custom Cruiser; 1994 – 1996 Chevrolet Impala	The successor to the B I platform.
1959 Buick Electra	C I	RWD	1936	1984	1936 – 1936 Cadillac Series 80; 1936 – 1937 Cadillac Series 70; 1936 – 1958 Buick Roadmaster; 1937 – 1938 Cadillac Series 65; 1938 – 1976 Cadillac Sixty Special; 1940 – 1964 Cadillac Series 62; 1940 – 1958 Buick Super; 1940 – 1940 LaSalle Series 52; 1940 – 1941 Pontiac Torpedo; 1941 – 1984 Oldsmobile 98; 1948 – 1950 Cadillac Series 61; 1958 – 1958 Buick Limited; 1959 – 1966 Cadillac Eldorado; 1959 – 1984 Cadillac Deville; 1959 – 1984 Buick Electra; 1965 – 1976 Cadillac Calais; 1971 – 1976 Buick Estate; 1971 – 1976 Oldsmobile Custom Cruiser; 1971 – 1976 Pontiac Safari; 1971 – 1976 Pontiac Grand Safari; 1971 – 1972 Chevrolet Townsman; 1971 – 1972 Chevrolet Kingswood; 1971 – 1972 Chevrolet Brookwood; 1977 – 1984 Cadillac Fleetwood Brougham	All references to 1971–76 GM station wagons should be B1, not C1. Although the wheelbases on the wagons were longer than the sedans, the architecture matched that of B-body. Check the door inner bottom trim or the rear door cutline. The body letter became 2nd digit of the cowl tag about 1973 and the Buick Estate Wagon is mentioned as the 4BN35 and 4BN45 in the 1976 sales brochure. Electra sedan is 4CV39 in same brochure.
1989 Oldsmobile Touring Sedan	C II	FWD	1985	1996	1985 – 1987 Cadillac Series 75; 1985 – 1992 Cadillac Fleetwood; 1985 – 1993 Cadillac Deville; 1985 – 1990 Buick Electra; 1985 – 1996 Oldsmobile 98; 1987 – 1993 Oldsmobile Touring Sedan; 1987 – 1993 Cadillac Sixty Special; 1991 – 1996 Buick Park Avenue	GM's first fullsize FWD, transverse engine platform.
1958 Cadillac Series 75	D I	RWD	1936	1984	1936 – 1984 Cadillac Commercial Chassis; 1936 – 1937 Cadillac Series 85; 1936 – 1940 Cadillac Series 90; 1936 – 1942 Buick Limited; 1936 – 1976 Cadillac Series 75; 1940 – 1940 Cadillac Series 72; 1941 – 1942 Cadillac Series 67; 1977 – 1984 Cadillac Fleetwood Limousine	1975–76 Cadillac Series 75 became the Limousine and Nine-Passenger Sedan (w/o glass partition) in literature.
1990 Cadillac Brougham	D II	RWD	1985	1996	1985 – 1986 Cadillac Fleetwood Brougham; 1987 – 1992 Cadillac Brougham; 1993 – 1996 Cadillac Fleetwood; 1985 – 1996 Cadillac Commercial Chassis	The successor to the C I platform.
1967 Oldsmobile Toronado	E	FWD	1963	2002	1963 – 1993 Buick Riviera; 1988 – 1991 Buick Reatta; 1967 – 2002 Cadillac Eldorado; 1966 – 1992 Oldsmobile Toronado; 1968 – 1970 Jetaway 707*	The first post-WWII FWD cars in the United States. An extended 6-wheel variant of this platform was used for the GMC motorhome.
1969 Pontiac Firebird	F I	RWD	1967	1969	1967 – 1969 Chevrolet Camaro; 1967 – 1969 Pontiac Firebird	
1974 Chevrolet Camaro	F II	RWD	1970	1981	1970 – 1981 Chevrolet Camaro; 1970 – 1981 Pontiac Firebird	The successor to the F I platform.
1989 Pontiac Firebird	F III	RWD	1982	1992	1982 – 1992 Chevrolet Camaro; 1982 – 1992 Pontiac Firebird	The successor to the F II platform.
2000 Chevrolet Camaro	F IV	RWD	1993	2002	1993 – 2002 Chevrolet Camaro; 1993 – 2002 Pontiac Firebird	The successor to the F III platform.
1987 Buick Regal	G I	RWD	1969	1988	1969 – 1972 Pontiac Grand Prix; 1982 – 1987 Buick Regal; 1982 – 1987 Chevrolet El Camino; 1982 – 1983 Chevrolet Malibu; 1982 – 1987 GMC Caballero; 1982 – 1988 Oldsmobile Cutlass Supreme; 1982 – 1986 Pontiac Bonneville; 1982 – 1986 Pontiac Grand LeMans (Canada); 1982 – 1987 Pontiac Grand Prix; 1982 – 1988 Chevrolet Monte Carlo	1969–1972 Pontiac Grand Prix first used G platform designation for special A III platform. 1982–1988 G platform is a redesignation of the RWD A V platform that continued production past 1981.
2003 Pontiac Bonneville	G II	FWD	1995	2005	1995 – 1999 Buick Riviera; 1995 – 2003 Oldsmobile Aurora; 1997 – 2005 Buick Park Avenue; 1998 – 2004 Cadillac Seville; 2000 – 2005 Buick LeSabre; 2000 – 2005 Pontiac Bonneville; 2000 – 2005 Cadillac Deville	The consolidated successor to the G I, C II, H II, and K II platforms.
2006 Buick Lucerne	G III	FWD	2006	2011	2006 – 2011 Cadillac DTS; 2006 – 2001 Buick Lucerne	The successor to the G II platform.
1973 Pontiac Astre	H I	RWD	1971	1980	1971 – 1977 Chevrolet Vega; 1973 – 1977 Pontiac Astre; 1975 – 1980 Chevrolet Monza; 1975 – 1980 Buick Skyhawk; 1975 – 1980 Oldsmobile Starfire; 1976 – 1980 Pontiac Sunbird	Successor to the Y I platform.
1998 Pontiac Bonneville	H II	FWD	1986	1999	1986 – 1999 Buick LeSabre; 1986 – 1999 Oldsmobile 88; 1987 – 1999 Pontiac Bonneville	Indirect successor to the G I platform.
1985 Cadillac Cimarron	J	FWD	1981	2005	1981 – 1989 Buick Skyhawk; 1981 – 1988 Cadillac Cimarron; 1981 – 2005 Chevrolet Cavalier; 1981 – 1988 Oldsmobile Firenza; 1981 – 1994 Pontiac Sunbird; 1982 – 1996 Chevrolet Monza; 1982 – 1989 Holden Camira; 1982 – 1989 Vauxhall Cavalier; 1982 – 1989 Opel Ascona; 1983 – 1989 Isuzu Aska*; 1990 – 2000 Daewoo Espero; 1994 – 2005 Pontiac Sunfire; 1995 – 1997 Daewoo Aranos; 1998 – 2000 Toyota Cavalier*	The successor to the H I platform.
1977 Cadillac Seville	K I	RWD	1975	1979	1975 – 1979 Cadillac Seville	Used solely for the Seville.
1996 Cadillac Deville	K II	FWD	1980	1999	1980 – 1997 Cadillac Seville; 1994 – 1999 Cadillac Deville	The successor to the K I platform.
1989 Chevrolet Beretta	L	FWD	1987	1996	1987 – 1996 Chevrolet Beretta; 1987 – 1991 Pontiac Tempest; 1987 – 1996 Chevrolet Corsica	The successor to the X II platform.
1988 Chevrolet Astro	M	RWD/AWD	1985	2005	1985 – 2005 Chevrolet Astro; 1985 – 2005 GMC Safari	Mechanically unrelated to the FWD M platform, which was sold to Suzuki before production.
1991 Oldsmobile Cutlass Calais	N I	FWD	1984	1991	1985 – 1991 Pontiac Grand Am; 1985 – 1991 Oldsmobile Cutlass Calais; 1985 – 1987 Buick Somerset; 1986 – 1991 Buick Skylark	
1994 Buick Skylark	N II	FWD	1992	1998	1992 – 1998 Pontiac Grand Am; 1992 – 1998 Oldsmobile Achieva; 1992 – 1998 Buick Skylark	The successor to the N I platform.
2001 Chevrolet Malibu	N III	FWD	1999	2005	1997 – 1999 Oldsmobile Cutlass; 1997 – 2003 Chevrolet Malibu; 1999 – 2005 Pontiac Grand Am; 1999 – 2004 Oldsmobile Alero; 2004 – 2005 Chevrolet Classic	The consolidated successor to the A VI, L, and N II platforms. Also called the P-90 and GMX130 platforms.
1987 Pontiac Fiero	P I	mid-engine, RWD	1983	1988	1984 – 1988 Pontiac Fiero	Used solely for the Fiero. The only mid-engined platform from GM until that of the 2020 Corvette.
1996 General Motors EV1	P II	FWD	1996	2003	1996 – 2003 General Motors EV1	Used solely for the EV1. Also called the BEV1 platform retroactively since the introduction of the BEV2 platform in 2016.
1993 Asüna Sunfire	R	FWD/AWD	1985	1993	1985 – 1988 Chevrolet Spectrum; 1985 – 1986 Holden Gemini; 1985 – 1993 Isuzu Gemini*; 1985 – 1989 Isuzu I-Mark*; 1985 – 1990 Chevrolet Gemini; 1985 – 1989 Pontiac Sunburst; 1988 – 1989 Geo Spectrum; 1990 – 1993 Isuzu Piazza*; 1990 – 1993 Isuzu Impulse*; 1990 – 1993 Asüna Sunfire; 1990 – 1993 Isuzu Stylus*	An indirect successor to the T I platform.
1990 Holden Nova	S I	FWD	1987	2006	1987 – 1992 Toyota Corolla*; 1987 – 1992 Toyota Sprinter*; 1988 – 2006 Toyota Conquest*; 1989 – 1994 Holden Nova; 1990 – 1992 Geo Prizm	Produced by NUMMI and UAAI, joint ventures between GM and Toyota.
1996 Geo Prizm	S II	FWD/AWD	1991	2002	1991 – 2002 Toyota Corolla*; 1991 – 1998 Toyota Sprinter*; 1992 – 1997 Geo Prizm; 1994 – 1999 Holden Nova	Produced by NUMMI and UAAI, joint ventures between GM and Toyota. The successor to the S I platform.
1999 Chevrolet Prizm	S III	FWD/AWD	1995	2002	1995 – 2002 Toyota Corolla*; 1995 – 2002 Toyota Sprinter*; 1997 – 1997 Geo Prizm; 1997 – 2001 Chevrolet Prizm	Produced by NUMMI, a joint venture between GM and Toyota. The successor to the S II platform.
2006 Pontiac Vibe	S IV	FWD/AWD	2000	2017	2000 – 2017 Toyota Corolla*; 2002 – 2008 Toyota Matrix*; 2002 – 2004 Toyota Voltz; 2003 – 2008 Pontiac Vibe	Produced by NUMMI, a joint venture between GM and Toyota. The successor to the S III platform.
2009 Pontiac Vibe	S V	FWD/AWD	2006	2013	2006–2013 Toyota Corolla; 2009 – 2014 Toyota Matrix*; 2009 – 2010 Pontiac Vibe	Produced by NUMMI, a joint venture between GM and Toyota. The successor to the S IV platform.
1978 Holden Gemini	T I	RWD	1973	1995	1973 – 1979 Opel Kadett; 1974 – 1978 Opel K 180; 1974 – 1987 Isuzu Gemini*; 1975 – 1984 Holden Gemini; 1975 – 1987 Chevrolet Chevette; 1975 – 1980 Buick Opel; 1976 – 1987 Pontiac Acadian; 1977 – 1986 Daewoo Max; 1977 – 1989 Daewoo Maepsy; 1980 – 1990 Isuzu Piazza*; 1980 – 1994 Chevrolet Marajó; 1980 – 1990 Isuzu Impulse*; 1981 – 1985 Isuzu I-Mark*; 1986 – 1990 Holden Piazza; 1992 – 1995 GMC Chevette	The last RWD compact platform to be produced by GM.
1993 Asüna SE	T II	FWD	1979	2012	1979 – 1998 Vauxhall Astra; 1979 – 1999 Opel Kadett; 1986 – 1994 Daewoo LeMans; 1986 – 1991 Vauxhall Belmont; 1988 – 1991 Passport Optima; 1991 – 1993 Asüna GT; 1991 – 1993 Asüna SE; 1988 – 1993 Pontiac LeMans; 1995 – 2005 Holden Astra; 1991 – 2011 Chevrolet Astra; 1991 – 2009 Opel Astra; 1994 – 2016 Daewoo Cielo; 1996 – 2007 Daewoo Nexia; 1999 – 2005 Opel Zafira; 1999 – 2005 Vauxhall Zafira; 2001 – 2012 Chevrolet Zafira	The successor to the T I, this platform was the first in a continuing series of small FWD GM platforms.
1990 Chevrolet Lumina APV	U I	FWD	1989	1996	1990 – 1996 Chevrolet Lumina APV; 1990 – 1996 Oldsmobile Silhouette; 1990 – 1996 Pontiac Trans Sport	Also called the GMT 199 platform.
1997 Vauxhall Sintra	U II	FWD/AWD	1996	2005	1996 – 1999 Opel Sintra; 1996 – 1999 Vauxhall Sintra; 1997 – 2005 Chevrolet Venture; 1997 – 2004 Oldsmobile Silhouette; 1997 – 1999 Pontiac Trans Sport; 1997 – 2004 Chevrolet Trans Sport; 1998 – 2004 Pontiac Montana; 1999 – 2005 Buick GL8	Also called the GMT 200 platform,.
2007 Saturn Relay	U III	FWD/AWD	2001	2010	2001 – 2005 Pontiac Aztek; 2002 – 2007 Buick Rendezvous; 2004 – 2009 Pontiac Montana; 2005 – 2007 Buick Terraza; 2005 – 2007 Saturn Relay; 2005 – 2009 Chevrolet Uplander; 2005 – 2010 Buick GL8	Also called the GMT 201 platform and the GMT 250 platform.
1968 Opel Rekord	V I	RWD	1966	2007	1966 – 1986 Opel Rekord; 1966 – 1971 Chevrolet Opala; 1966 – 1971 Chevrolet Comodoro; 1966 – 1977 Opel Ranger; 1967 – 1982 Opel Commodore; 1967 – 1982 Chevrolet Commodore; 1972 – 1977 Chevrolet Iran; 1977 – 1982 Vauxhall Viceroy; 1977 – 1982 Daewoo Royale; 1977 – 1994 Vauxhall Carlton; 1978 – 1986 Opel Monza; 1978 – 1994 Opel Senator; 1978 – 1987 Vauxhall Royale; 1978 – 1987 Chevrolet Senator; 1978 – 2007 Holden Commodore; 1978 – 2007 Holden Calais; 1986 – 2003 Opel Omega; 1987 – 1994 Vauxhall Senator; 1988 – 2007 Holden Berlina; 1990 – 2006 Holden Statesman; 1990 – 1992 Lotus Carlton*; 1990 – 2006 Holden Caprice; 1990 – 2000 Holden Utility; 1991 – 1997 Daewoo Prince; 1992 – 2007 Chevrolet Omega; 1994 – 2003 Vauxhall Omega; 1994 – 2003 Cadillac Catera; 1997 – 2007 Chevrolet Lumina; 1999 – 2006 Buick Royaum; 1999 – 2006 Daewoo Statesman; 2000 – 2007 Holden Ute; 2001 – 2006 Holden Monaro; 2001 – 2006 Vauxhall Monaro; 2004 – 2006 Pontiac GTO	Indirect successor to the B I platform. Also used for the Buick XP2000 concept car.
1991 Cadillac Allanté	V II	FWD	1987	1993	1987 – 1993 Cadillac Allanté	Short-wheelbase variant of the E platform.
1992 Oldsmobile Cutlass Supreme	W I	FWD	1988	2001	1988 – 1996 Buick Regal; 1988 – 1997 Oldsmobile Cutass Supreme; 1988 – 1997 Pontiac Grand Prix; 1990 – 2001 Chevrolet Lumina; 1995 – 1999 Chevrolet Monte Carlo	
2004 Chevrolet Monte Carlo	W II	FWD	1997	2005	1997 – 2004 Buick Regal; 1997 – 2005 Buick Century; 1997 – 2003 Pontiac Grand Prix; 1998 – 2002 Oldsmobile Intrigue; 2000 – 2005 Chevrolet Impala; 2000 – 2005 Chevrolet Monte Carlo	The successor to the W I platform.
2007 Pontiac Grand Prix	W III	FWD	2004	2016	2004 – 2008 Pontiac Grand Prix; 2005 – 2009 Buick LaCrosse; 2005 – 2009 Buick Allure; 2006 – 2007 Chevrolet Monte Carlo; 2006 – 2016 Chevrolet Impala	The successor to the W II platform.
1973 Buick Apollo	X I	RWD	1961	1979	1962 – 1967 Chevrolet Chevy II; 1968 – 1979 Chevrolet Nova; 1973 – 1975 Buick Apollo; 1975 – 1979 Buick Skylark; 1973 – 1979 Oldsmobile Omega; 1971 – 1977 Pontiac Ventura; 1977 – 1979 Pontiac Phoenix	
1980 Pontiac Phoenix	X II	FWD	1979	1985	1980 – 1985 Buick Skylark; 1980 – 1985 Chevrolet Citation; 1980 – 1984 Oldsmobile Omega; 1980 – 1984 Pontiac Phoenix	The successor to the X I platform.
1962 Oldsmobile Jetfire	Y I	RWD	1960	1964	1961 – 1963 Buick Special; 1961 – 1963 Oldsmobile F-85; 1961 – 1963 Pontiac Tempest; 1962 – 1963 Oldsmobile Jetfire; 1962 – 1963 Buick Skylark; 1963 – 1963 Pontiac LeMans	
2008 Cadillac XLR	Y II	RWD	1984	2019	1984 – 2019 Chevrolet Corvette; 2004 – 2009 Cadillac XLR	Indirect successor to the Y I platform.
1966 Chevrolet Corvair	Z I	rear-engine, RWD	1960	1969	1960 – 1969 Chevrolet Corvair	The only rear-engined platform GM has produced, used solely for the Corvair.
1999 Saturn SW	Z II	FWD	1991	2002	1991 – 2002 Saturn SL; 1991 – 2002 Saturn SC; 1992 – 2002 Saturn SW	Not a direct successor to the Z I platform, sharing the name only.

=== Others ===
Example Image	Name	Layout	Introduced	Ended	Vehicles Underpinned	Notes
2016 Chevrolet Camaro	Alpha I	RWD/AWD	2012	2023	2016–2023 Chevrolet Camaro; 2013–2019 Cadillac ATS; 2014–2019 Cadillac CTS	This generation of the Alpha platform remains in production solely for the Camaro, which will be succeeded in 2023 by a model upon VSS-R.
2019 Chevrolet Bolt	BEV2	FWD/RWD/AWD	2016	2023	2017–2023 Chevrolet Bolt; 2021–2023 Chevrolet Bolt EUV; 2017–2020 Opel Ampera-e; 2020–2022 Buick Velite 7	The successor to the P II platform.
2004 Saturn Ion	Delta I	FWD	2003	2014	2003 – 2007 Saturn Ion; 2004 – 2014 Opel Astra; 2004 – 2014 Vauxhall Astra; 2004 – 2010 Chevrolet Cobalt; 2005 – 2011 Chevrolet Astra; 2005 – 2006 Pontiac Pursuit; 2005 – 2006 Pontiac G4; 2005 – 2011 Holden Astra; 2005 – 2009 Opel Zafira; 2009 – 2014 Chevrolet Zafira; 2005 – 2009 Vauxhall Zafira; 2006 – 2011 Chevrolet HHR; 2007 – 2011 Chevrolet Vectra; 2007 – 2010 Pontiac G5; 2007 – 2009 Saturn Astra	The consolidated successor to the J, R, T II, and Z II platforms. Also called the GMT 001 platform for the HHR.
2014 Vauxhall Ampera	Delta II	FWD/AWD	2008	2019	2008 – 2016 Chevrolet Cruze; 2008 – 2016 Holden Cruze; 2008 – 2011 Daewoo Lacetti Premiere; 2009 – 2015 Opel Astra; 2009 – 2015 Vauxhall Astra; 2009 – 2016 Buick Excelle; 2010 – 2019 Chevrolet Volt; 2010 – 2019 Buick Velite 5; 2010 – 2019 Opel Ampera; 2010 – 2018 Chevrolet Orlando; 2010 – 2019 Vauxhall Ampera; 2011 – 2019 Opel Zafira Tourer; 2011 – 2019 Vauxhall Zafira Tourer; 2012 – 2017 Buick Verano; 2013 – 2019 Opel Cascada; 2013 – 2018 Baojun 560; 2013 – 2016 Cadillac ELR; 2013 – 2019 Buick Cascada; 2013 – 2019 Vauxhall Cascada; 2014 – 2017 Holden Cascada	The successor to the Delta I platform.
2018 GMC Terrain	D2XX	FWD/AWD	2012	2024	2015–2023 Chevrolet Cruze; 2015–2021 Opel Astra; 2015–2020 Holden Astra; 2015–2021 Vauxhall Astra; 2015–2023 Buick Envision; 2015–2021 Buick Verano; 2016–2019 Chevrolet Volt; 2016–2019 Buick Velite 5; 2018–2024 Chevrolet Equinox; 2018–2024 GMC Terrain; 2019–2023 Chevrolet Orlando	The successor to both the Delta II and Theta platforms, in accordance with GM's newest nomenclature.
2008 Cadillac BLS	Epsilon I	FWD/AWD	2002	2014	2002 – 2008 Opel Vectra; 2002 – 2008 Vauxhall Vectra; 2002 – 2007 Holden Vectra; 2002 – 2014 Saab 9-3; 2003 – 2008 Opel Signum; 2003 – 2008 Vauxhall Signum; 2004 – 2012 Chevrolet Malibu; 2005 – 2010 Pontiac G6; 2005 – 2011 Fiat Croma; 2006 – 2011 Chevrolet Vectra; 2006 – 2006 Cadillac BLS; 2007 – 2010 Saturn Aura	The consolidated successor to the G III, N III, GM2900, W, and Zeta platforms. Also used for the Saab PhoeniX and Opel Signum2 concept cars
2014 Roewe 950	Epsilon II	FWD/AWD	2008	2019	2008 – 2017 Opel Insignia; 2008 – 2017 Vauxhall Insignia; 2008 – 2010 Chevrolet Vectra; 2010 – 2016 Buick LaCrosse; 2010 – 2016 Buick Allure; 2010 – 2015 GM Alpheon; 2010 – 2012 Saab 9-5; 2011 – 2017 Buick Regal; 2012–2022 SAIC Roewe 950; 2012 – 2019 Cadillac XTS; 2012 – 2016 Chevrolet Malibu; 2013 – 2016 Holden Malibu; 2015 – 2017 Holden Insignia	The successor to the Epsilon I platform. Also used for the Buick Riviera and Opel GTC concept cars.
1991 Holden Calibra	GM2900	FWD	1988	2016	1988 – 2002 Chevrolet Vectra; 1988 – 1995 Vauxhall Cavalier; 1989 – 1997 Opel Calibra; 1989 – 1997 Holden Calibra; 1989 – 1997 Vauxhall Calibra; 1994 – 2002 Holden Vectra; 1994 – 1998 Saab 900; 1995 – 2002 Vauxhall Vectra; 1997 – 2010 Saab 9-5; 1998 – 2003 Saab 9-3; 2000 – 2005 Saturn LS; 2000 – 2005 Saturn LW; 2012 – 2017 BAIC Senova D70*; 2015 – 2017 BAIC Senova D80*	An indirect successor to the J platform.
2011 Chevrolet Montana	GM4200	FWD	1982	2021	1983 – 1992 Vauxhall Nova; 1983 – 2000 Opel Corsa; 1993 – 2000 Vauxhall Corsa; 1993 – 2000 Opel Vita; 1993 – 2000 Holden Barina; 1993 – 2001 Chevrolet Corsa; 1994 – 2000 Opel Tigra; 1994 – 2012 Chevrolet Chevy; 2000 – 2015 Chevrolet Celta; 2001 – 2004 Buick Sail; 2002 – 2016 Chevrolet Classic; 2003 – 2021 Chevrolet Montana; 2005 – 2010 Chevrolet Sail; 2006 – 2012 Chevrolet Prisma; 2009 – 2016 Chevrolet Agile	Originally the S platform. Eventually succeeded the Suzuki M platform.
1992 Asüna Sunrunner	GMT 190	RWD/AWD	1989	2016	1989 – 1991 GMC Tracker; 1989 – 2016 Chevrolet Tracker; 1989 – 1998 Geo Tracker; 1989 – 2005 Suzuki Escudo*; 1992 – 1993 Asüna Sunrunner; 1994 – 1998 Pontiac Sunrunner; 1999 – 2004 Suzuki Vitara*	Name retroactively applied in 2002 with the introduction of the GMT 191, GMT 192, and GMT 193 platforms.
2004 GMC Envoy XUV	GMT 305	RWD/AWD	2004	2005	2004 – 2005 GMC Envoy XUV	Produced solely for the Envoy XUV.
1991 GMC Sonoma	GMT 325	RWD/AWD	1981	2012	1982 – 2012 Chevrolet S10; 1982 – 1991 GMC S15; 1991 – 2004 GMC Sonoma; 1991 – 1991 GMC Syclone; 1996 – 2000 Isuzu Hombre*	Mechanically very similar to the GMT 330 platform. Name retroactively applied in 1988 with the introduction of the GMT 400 platform.
1998 Oldsmobile Bravada	GMT 330	RWD/AWD	1981	2005	1982 – 2005 Chevrolet Blazer; 1982 – 2005 GMC Jimmy; 1991 – 2001 Oldsmobile Bravada; 1991 – 1993 GMC Typhoon; 1996 – 2002 Opel Blazer; 1998 – 2000 GMC Envoy	Mechanically very similar to the GMT 325 platform. Name retroactively applied 1988 with the introduction of the GMT 400 platform.
2006 Hummer H3	GMT 345	RWD/AWD	2005	2010	2005 – 2010 Hummer H3	Produced solely for the H3. Also used for the Hummer HX concept car. Mechanically very similar to the GMT 745 platform.
2010 Great Wall SoCool	GMT 355	RWD/AWD	2003	2012	2003 – 2012 Chevrolet Colorado; 2003 – 2012 Isuzu Rodeo*; 2003 – 2008 Holden Rodeo; 2003 – 2012 GMC Canyon; 2003 – 2010 Great Wall SoCool*; 2003 – 2008 Great Wall Pegasus*; 2005 – 2008 Isuzu I-series*	The successor to the GMT 325 platform.
2005 Buick Rainier	GMT 360	RWD/AWD	2001	2009	2002 – 2009 Chevrolet TrailBlazer; 2002 – 2009 GMC Envoy; 2002 – 2004 Oldsmobile Bravada; 2003 – 2008 Isuzu Ascender*; 2004 – 2007 Buick Rainier; 2005 – 2009 Saab 9-7X	The successor to the GMT 330 platform.
2006 Chevrolet SSR	GMT 368	RWD	2002	2006	2003 – 2006 Chevrolet SSR	Short-wheelbase variant of the GMT 360 platform, produced solely for the SSR.
2007 Isuzu Ascender EXT	GMT 370	RWD/AWD	2002	2007	2002 – 2006 Chevrolet Trailblazer EXT; 2002 – 2006 GMC Envoy XL; 2003 – 2007 Isuzu Ascender EXT	Long-wheelbase variant of the GMT 360 platform.
1993 Chevrolet C/K	GMT 400	RWD/AWD	1988	2000	1988 – 2000 Chevrolet C/K	Mechanically very similar to the GMT 480 platform.
1995 Chevrolet Suburban	GMT 410	RWD/AWD	1992	1999	1992 – 1999 Chevrolet Suburban	Mechanically very similar to the GMT 425 platform.
1992 Chevrolet K5 Blazer	GMT 415	RWD/AWD	1992	1994	1992 – 1994 Chevrolet K5 Blazer	Mechanically very similar to the GMT 420 and GMT 430 platforms.
1997 Chevrolet Tahoe	GMT 420	RWD/AWD	1995	2000	1995 – 2000 Chevrolet Tahoe	Mechanically very similar to the GMT 430 and GMT 415 platforms.
1998 GMC Suburban	GMT 425	RWD/AWD	1992	1999	1992 – 1999 GMC Suburban	Mechanically very similar to the GMT 410 platform.
1996 GMC Yukon	GMT 430	RWD/AWD	1992	2000	1992 – 2000 GMC Yukon	Mechanically very similar to the GMT 420 and GMT 415 platforms.
2002 Chevrolet Chassis Cab	GMT 435	RWD/AWD	1999	2000	1999 – 2000 Chevrolet C2500; 1999 – 2000 GMC C2500	Short-wheelbase derivative of the GMT 455 platform.
1992 Chevrolet Chassis Cab	GMT 455	RWD/AWD	1991	2002	1991 – 2002 Chevrolet C3500; 1991 – 2002 GMC C3500	Mechanically very similar to the GMT 435 platform.
1993 GMC Sierra 2500	GMT 480	RWD/AWD	1988	2000	1988 – 2000 GMC Sierra	Mechanically very similar to the GMT 400 platform.
1997 Chevrolet Kodiak	GMT 530	RWD/AWD	1990	2008	1990 – 2002 GMC Topkick; 1990 – 2002 Chevrolet Kodiak	The first solely medium-duty GM truck platform.
2009 GMC TopKick	GMT 560	RWD/AWD	2003	2018	2003 – 2010 GMC TopKick; 2003 – 2010 Chevrolet Kodiak; 2003 – 2018 Isuzu H-Series	The successor to the GMT 530 platform. The last solely medium-duty GM truck platform.
1999 Chevrolet Express	GMT 600	RWD	1995	2002	1996 – 2002 Chevrolet Express; 1996 – 2002 GMC Savana	Mechanically very similar to its successor, the GMT 610 platform.
2009 Hummer H3T	GMT 745	RWD/AWD	2009	2010	2009 – 2010 Hummer H3T	Produced solely for the H3T, the pickup variant of the H3. Mechanically very similar to the GMT 345 platform.
2002 GMC Sierra	GMT 800	RWD/AWD	1999	2006	1999 – 2006 Chevrolet Silverado; 1999 – 2006 GMC Sierra	The consolidated successor to the GMT 400 and GMT 480 platforms.
2002 Chevrolet Avalanche	GMT 805	RWD/AWD	2002	2006	2002 – 2006 Chevrolet Avalanche	Indirect successor to the GMT 455 platform.
2005 Cadillac Escalade EXT	GMT 806	RWD/AWD	2002	2006	2002 – 2006 Cadillac Escalade EXT	Indirect successor to the GMT 455 platform.
2009 Hummer H2	GMT 820	RWD/AWD	2000	2009	2000 – 2006 Chevrolet Tahoe; 2000 – 2006 GMC Yukon; 2002 – 2009 Hummer H2; 2002 – 2006 Cadillac Escalade	The successor to the GMT 415, GMT 420, and GMT 430 platforms.
2001 GMC Yukon XL	GMT 830	RWD/AWD	2000	2006	2000 – 2006 GMC Yukon XL; 2000 – 2006 Chevrolet Suburban; 2000 – 2006 Cadillac Escalade ESV	The successor to the GMT 410 and GMT 425 platforms.
2005 Chevrolet Silverado 2500	GMT 880	RWD/AWD	1999	2006	1999 – 2006 GMC Sierra 2500; 1999 – 2006 Chevrolet Silverado 2500; 1999 – 2006 GMC Sierra 3500; 1999 – 2006 Chevrolet SIlverado 3500	The consolidated successor to the GMT 435 and GMT 455 platforms.
2010 GMC Sierra	GMT 900	RWD/AWD	2007	2013	2007 – 2013 GMC Sierra; 2007 – 2013 Chevrolet Silverado	The successor to the GMT 800 platform.
2012 Chevrolet Silverado 3500	GMT 910	RWD/AWD	2007	2013	2007 – 2014 GMC Sierra 2500; 2007 – 2014 Chevrolet Silverado 2500; 2007 – 2014 GMC Sierra 3500; 2007 – 2014 Chevrolet SIlverado 3500	The successor to the GMT 880 platform.
2008 GMC Yukon	GMT 920	RWD/AWD	2007	2014	2007 – 2014 Chevrolet Tahoe; 2007 – 2014 Cadillac Escalade; 2007 – 2014 GMC Yukon	The successor to the GMT 820 platform.
2007 Chevrolet Suburban	GMT 930	RWD/AWD	2007	2014	2007 – 2014 Chevrolet Suburban; 2007 – 2014 Cadillac Escalade ESV; 2007 – 2014 GMC Yukon XL	The successor to the GMT 830 platform.
2007 Chevrolet Avalanche	GMT 940	RWD/AWD	2006	2013	2007 – 2013 Chevrolet Avalanche; 2007 – 2013 Cadillac Escalade EXT	The consolidated successor to the GMT 805 and GMT 806 platforms.
2016 Cadillac Escalade ESV	GMT K2XX	RWD/AWD	2013	2020	2014 – 2020 GMC Sierra; 2014 – 2020 Chevrolet Silverado; 2015 – 2020 Chevrolet Tahoe; 2015 – 2020 Chevrolet Suburban; 2015 – 2020 Cadillac Escalade; 2015 – 2020 Cadillac Escalade ESV; 2015 – 2020 GMC Yukon; 2015 – 2020 GMC Yukon XL	The consolidated successor to the GMT 900, GMT 910, GMT 920, GMT 930, and GMT 940 platforms.
2018 Chevrolet Spark	G2XX	FWD/AWD	2015	2022	2015–2019 Opel Karl; 2015–2019 Vauxhall Viva; 2016–2022 Chevrolet Spark; 2016 – 2018 Holden Spark; 2019–2022 VinFast Fadil	The successor to the Gamma II platform, in accordance with GM's renaming of most of their platforms in "_ _ XX" format circa 2015.
2009 Saturn Sky	Kappa	RWD	2006	2009	2006 – 2010 Pontiac Solstice; 2006 – 2010 Saturn Sky; 2007 – 2009 Daewoo G2X; 2007 – 2010 Opel GT; 2008 – 2009 Breckland Beira*; 2012–present Tauro V8 Spider*	Indirect successor to the Y II platform. Also used for the Saturn Curve concept car.
2008 Buick Enclave	Lambda	FWD/AWD	2006	2017	2007 – 2010 Saturn Outlook; 2007 – 2016 GMC Acadia; 2008 – 2017 Buick Enclave; 2009 – 2017 Chevrolet Traverse	The successor to the U III platform's two crossovers, as well as the GMT 370 platform. Also called the GMT 510 platform and the GMT 960 platform.
2016 Cadillac CT6	Omega	RWD/AWD	2016	2023	2016–2023 Cadillac CT6	The successor to the Zeta platform. Also used for the 2015 Buick Avenir concept car.
2019 Buick LaCrosse	P2XX	FWD/AWD	2017	2023	2017–2023 Buick LaCrosse	An extended wheelbase derivative of the E2XX platform.
2007 Alfa Romeo Brera	Premium	FWD/AWD	2002	2003	2004 – 2011 Alfa Romeo 159*; 2006 – 2011 Alfa Romeo 159 Sportwagon*; 2005 – 2010 Alfa Romeo Brera*; 2006 – 2010 Alfa Romeo Spider*	Co-developed with Fiat-Chrysler (then just Fiat). GM never produced any models on this platform, instead moving its models to the Epsilon II platform. Also used for the Opel Insignia and Alfa Romeo Visconti concept cars.
2012 Cadillac SLS	Sigma I	RWD/AWD	2002	2013	2003 – 2007 Cadillac CTS; 2004 – 2009 Cadillac SRX; 2005 – 2011 Cadillac STS; 2007 – 2013 Cadillac SLS	Also called the GMT 265 platform for the SRX.
2010 Cadillac CTS	Sigma II	RWD/AWD	2008	2015	2008 – 2015 Cadillac CTS	Produced solely for the CTS.
2015 Opel Corsa	SCCS**	FWD/AWD	2005	2019	2005 – 2018 Fiat Grande Punto*; 2006 – 2019 Opel Corsa; 2006 – 2019 Vauxhall Corsa; 2007–2023 Fiat Fiorino*; 2007 – 2018 Fiat Linea*; 2008–2023 Fiat Qubo*; 2008 – 2018 Alfa Romeo MiTo*; 2010 – 2017 Opel Meriva; 2010–2022 Fiat Doblò*; 2010 – 2017 Vauxhall Meriva; 2011 – 2018 Opel Combo; 2011–2022 Fiat Pratico*; 2001 – 2018 Vauxhall Combo; 2012 – 2019 Opel Adam; 2012–2022 Fiat 500L*; 2012 – 2019 Vauxhall adam; 2014–present Jeep Renegade*; 2014–present Fiat 500X*; 2015–2022 Ram ProMaster City*; 2015–present Fiat Egea*; 2016–present Fiat Tipo*; 2016–present Fiat Toro*; 2016–present Jeep Compass*; 2017–present Fiat Argo*; 2018–present Fiat Cronos*	Co-developed with Fiat-Chrysler (then just Fiat).
1987 Chevrolet Sprint	Suzuki M I	FWD	1983	2004	1983 – 2004 Suzuki Cultus*; 1984 – 1988 Suzuki Swift*; 1984 – 1988 Pontiac Firefly; 1985 – 1990 Suzuki Forsa*; 1985 – 1988 Holden Barina; 1985 – 2004 Chevrolet Sprint; 1986 – 1988 Isuzu Geminett*; 1988 – 2000 Suzuki Khyber*	
1988–1992 Suzuki Swift	Suzuki M II	FWD	1988	2004	1988 – 1994 Holden Barina; 1989 – 1994 Pontiac Firefly; 1989 – 1992 Chevrolet Sprint; 1989 – 1994 Geo Metro; 1989 – 2004 Suzuki Swift*; 1989 – 2016 Suzuki Cultus*; 1990 – 1994 Maruti 1000*; 1994 – 2010 Maruti Esteem*; 1995 – 2003 Subaru Justy*; 1999 – 2015 Suzuki Lingyang*	The successor to the Suzuki M I platform.
1998 Chevrolet Metro	Suzuki M III	FWD	1995	2016	1995 – 2001 Pontiac Firefly; 1995 – 2001 Suzuki Swift*; 1995 – 1997 Geo Metro; 1998 – 2001 Chevrolet Metro	The successor to the Suzuki M II platform.
2016 Chevrolet Equinox	Theta	FWD/AWD	2002	2018	2002 – 2010 Saturn Vue; 2005 – 2017 Chevrolet Equinox; 2006 – 2015 Opel Antara; 2006 – 2015 Vauxhall Antara; 2006 – 2017 Chevrolet Captiva Sport; 2006 – 2009 Suzuki XL7; 2006 – 2009 Pontiac Torrent; 2006 – 2017 Holden Captiva 5/7; 2006 – 2001 Daewoo Winstorm/MaXX; 2006 – 2018 Chevrolet Captiva; 2008 – 2017 GMC Terrain	The successor to the GMT 360 platform. Also used for the Chevrolet S3X and T2X concept cars. Also called the GMT 191 platform for the Equinox, GMT 192 platform for the Torrent, and GMT 193 platform for the XL7.
2012 Saab 9-4X	Theta Premium	FWD/AWD	2010	2016	2010 – 2016 Cadillac SRX; 2011 – 2012 Saab 9-4X	Luxury variant of the Theta platform. Also called Theta-Epsilon since it shares components with the Epsilon II platform, as well as the GMT 267 platform.
2010 Daewoo Veritas	Zeta I	RWD	2006	2017	2006 – 2013 Holden Commodore; 2006 – 2010 Holden Statesman; 2006 – 2013 Holden Caprice; 2006 – 2013 Holden Ute; 2007 – 2011 Chevrolet Omega; 2007 – 2013 Vauxhall VXR8; 2007 – 2012 Buick Park Avenue; 2007 – 2017 Chevrolet Caprice; 2008 – 2009 Pontiac G8; 2008 – 2012 Bitter Vero*; 2008 – 2010 Daewoo Veritas; 2010 – 2015 Chevrolet Camaro; 2011 – 2013 Chevrolet Lumina	Also called the Global RWD Architecture. The consolidated successor to the B II, F IV, and V I platforms. Also used for the Holden Coupe 60 concept car.
2013 Holden Commodore	Zeta II	RWD	2013	2017	2013 – 2017 Holden Ute; 2013 – 2017 Holden Commodore; 2013 – 2017 Holden Caprice; 2013 – 2017 Vauxhall VXR8; 2014 – 2017 Chevrolet SS	Also called the Global RWD Architecture. The successor to the Zeta I platform.

- * These vehicles were/are not from GM brands, but rather were given license to a particular platform by GM, usually either from co-development or a platform nearing the end of its tenure.
- ** These platforms have active models, but no active models from any GM brands, and are thus considered former platforms for this list.

== Future platforms ==
In 2015 GM announced their intention to shift all of their vehicles (with the notable exception of the eighth-generation Corvette) to four platforms by 2025. The following are those platforms, including the already-launched VSS-F:

Vehicle Set Strategy
Name	Layout	Introduction	Vehicles to be Underpinned	Notes
VSS-F	FWD/AWD	2019	4th generation Chevrolet Sail (China; B segment); 3rd generation Chevrolet Spark (A segment); 2nd generation Chevrolet Sonic (B segment); 5th generation Chevrolet Cavalier (China; C segment); 3rd generation Chevrolet Onix (South America; B segment); 2nd generation Chevrolet Spin (South America; B segment); 3rd generation Chevrolet Cobalt (South America; C/B segment); 2nd generation Chevrolet Montana (South America; C/B segment); 2nd generation Chevrolet Prisma (South America; C segment); 3rd generation Chevrolet Cruze (C segment); 10th generation Chevrolet Malibu (D segment); 11th generation Chevrolet Impala (E segment); 3rd generation Chevrolet Volt (C segment hybrid electric); 2nd generation Chevrolet Bolt EV (A/B segment pure electric); 3rd generation Buick Verano (China; C segment); 3rd generation Buick Excelle (China; B segment); 7th generation Buick Regal (D segment); 4th generation Buick LaCrosse (E segment); 1st generation Buick Velite (C segment); 4th generation Buick GL8 (E segment); 1st generation Cadillac CT2 or CT3 (B segment)	The eventual consolidated successor to the Gamma II, G2XX, E2XX, D2XX, P2XX, PATAC K, U IV, GM4200, and GEM platforms. Slated to underpin all FWD GM cars plus subcompact crossovers by 2025.
VSS-R	RWD/AWD	2023	7th generation Chevrolet Camaro (pony car); 2nd generation Chevrolet SS (D segment); 2nd generation Cadillac CT3 or CT4 (C segment); 2nd generation Cadillac CT5 (E segment); 2nd or 3rd generation Cadillac CT6 (F segment); 2nd generation Cadillac Escala (F segment)	The eventual consolidated successor to the Alpha and Omega platforms. Slated to underpin all RWD GM vehicles by 2025.
VSS-S	FWD/AWD	2024	4th generation Chevrolet Blazer (midsize); 3rd generation Chevrolet Traverse (full-size); 2nd generation Chevrolet Trax/Tracker (subcompact); 4th generation Chevrolet Equinox (compact); 3rd generation Buick Enclave (full-size); 1st generation Buick Enspire (midsize); 2nd generation Buick Encore (supcompact); 2nd generation Buick Envision (compact); 3rd generation GMC Acadia (midsize); 1st generation GMC Acadia XL (full-size); 1st generation GMC Granite (subcompact); 3rd generation GMC Terrain (compact); 2nd generation Cadillac XT5 (midsize); 2nd generation Cadillac XT6 (full-size); 1st generation Cadillac XT2 or XT3 (subcompact); 2nd generation Cadillac XT4 (compact)	The eventual consolidated successor to the D2XX and C1XX platforms. Slated to underpin all GM crossovers (excluding those on VSS-F) by 2025.
VSS-T	RWD/AWD	2025	4th generation Chevrolet Silverado (full-size pickup truck); 6th generation Chevrolet Tahoe (full-size SUV); 13th generation Chevrolet Suburban (extended-length full-size SUV); 3rd generation Chevrolet Colorado (mid-size pickup truck); 1st generation Chevrolet Trailblazer (for markets outside North America) or a new midsize SUV; 2nd generation Chevrolet Express (full-size van); 3rd generation GMC Canyon (mid-size pickup truck); 5th generation GMC Sierra (full-size pickup truck); 6th generation GMC Yukon (full-size SUV); 6th generation GMC Yukon XL (extended-length full-size SUV); 2nd generation GMC Savana (full-size van); 6th generation Cadillac Escalade (full-size SUV)	The eventual consolidated successor to the GMT platforms. Slated to underpin all GM body-on-frame SUVs and trucks by 2025.

It is currently unknown whether GEM or a similar low-cost platform will be continued in some form as a subset of VSS.

=== EV platforms ===
- BEV2, base of the Chevrolet Bolt and Chevrolet Menlo
- BEV3, base of the Chevrolet Equinox EV and Chevrolet Blazer EV
- Ultium, base of the GMC Hummer EV and Cadillac Lyriq
