= General Motors M platform =

GM M platform
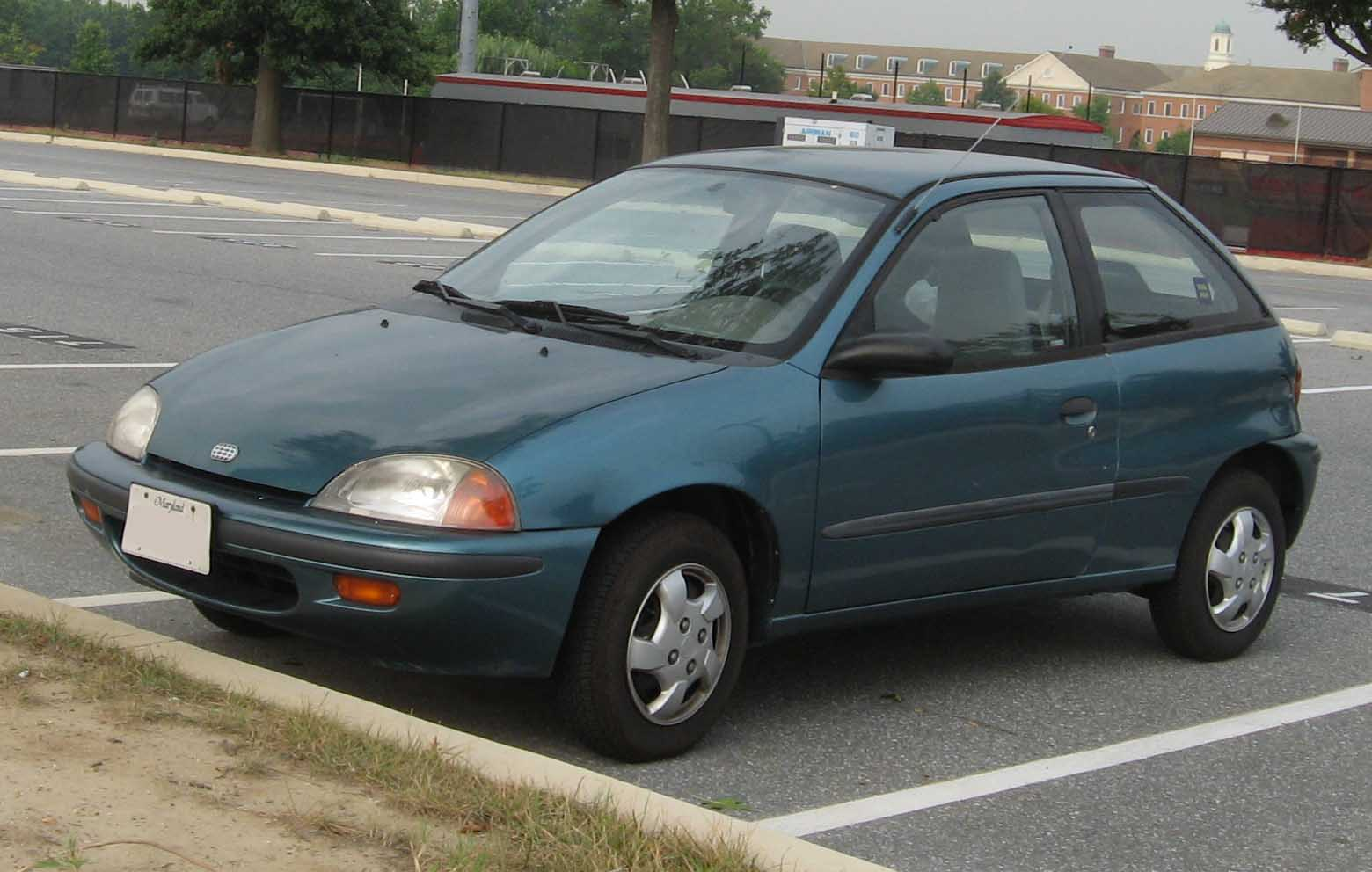
- Geo Metro

Overview
- Manufacturer: General Motors/Suzuki
- Also called: M-body
- Production: 1985–2001

Body and chassis
- Class: Subcompact (B)
- Layout: Transverse front-engine, front-wheel drive
- Body styles: 2-door convertible; 3-door Hatchback; 4-door sedan; 5-door hatchback

Powertrain
- Engines: 1.0 L G10 (I3); 1.0 L G10T (I3 Turbo); 1.3 L G13BA (I4 8v SOHC); 1.3 L G13BB (I4 16v SOHC); 1.3 L G13B (I4 16v DOHC)

Chronology
- Successor: GM4200 platform; GM T platform (1979)

The GM M platform was the designation used by General Motors for the platform that underpinned the first, second and third generation Suzuki Cultus and its offspring.

The first generation of this platform had been designed by Suzuki for their 1983 Cultus, and adopted by Chevrolet with the introduction of the Sprint.

The platforms of the second and third generations first appeared in 1989 and 1995 respectively. They were designed at GM's Technical Center in Warren, Michigan, USA. Suzuki designed all the engines, drivetrains and actual body. From 1985 through 1989, all models were imported from Suzuki's facilities in Hamamatsu, Japan. From 1990 on, some North American M-cars were produced at CAMI Automotive in Ingersoll, Ontario, Canada with the exception of the convertible and turbocharged models which were imported from Japan. The third generation M platform was only sold by Suzuki as the Suzuki Swift in North America as Suzuki decided to create their own Swift to market around the world.

The following vehicles used this platform:
Suzuki Cultus Generations I and II, GM M platform:

	Nameplate	Market	Body	
1985–1988	Suzuki Forsa	N. America	3/4	
1985–1988	Chevrolet Sprint	N. America (Colombian production continued until 2004)	3/4	
1989–1994	Suzuki Swift	N. America	3/4	
1985–2004	Suzuki Swift	Europe	5	^{a.}
1991–2004	Chevrolet Swift	Colombia	3/4	^{b.}
1989–1994	Pontiac Firefly	Canada	all	
1989–1994	Geo Metro	N. America	2/3/5	^{c.}
1988–1994	Holden Barina	Australia	3/5	^{d.}
1990–1994	Maruti Suzuki 1000	India	4	
1995–2007	Maruti Suzuki Esteem	India	4	
	Suzuki Jazz	Chile	un	
1995–2003	Subaru Justy	Europe	3/5	^{e.}
2000–2016	Suzuki Cultus	Pakistan	5	^{f.}
1999–2015	Chang'an Suzuki Lingyang	China	4	

2= 2-dr convertible
3= 3-dr hatchback
4= 4-dr sedan
5= 5-dr hatchback
un = unknown
^{a.} Manufactured at Magyar Suzuki
^{b.} Imported to Colombia
^{c.} Geo branded models in US after 1989, in Canada after 1992
^{d.} MF, MH: only generations of 'Cultus-derived' Barina
^{e.} Justy JMA/MS, manufactured at Magyar Suzuki
^{f.} Manufactured at Paksuzuki

Suzuki Cultus Generation III, GM M platform:

	Nameplate	Market	Body
Generation III
1995–2001	Suzuki Swift	N. America	3
1995–2001	Pontiac Firefly	Canada	3/4
1995–1997	Geo Metro	N. America	3/4
1998–2001	Chevrolet Metro	USA	3/4

3 = 3-dr hatchback
4 = 4-dr sedan
5 = 5-dr hatchback

GM also used a different M platform for its rear-wheel drive minivans, the Chevrolet Astro and the GMC Safari.

== See also ==
- List of General Motors platforms
- GM platforms
