= General Motors P platform =

Former American car platform designation

General Motors used the P-body or P platform designation to refer to two different vehicle lines:

1. 1984–1988 mid-engined Pontiac Fiero
2. 1996–2003 electric General Motors EV1, a.k.a. the BEV1 platform retroactively since the introduction of the BEV2 platform.
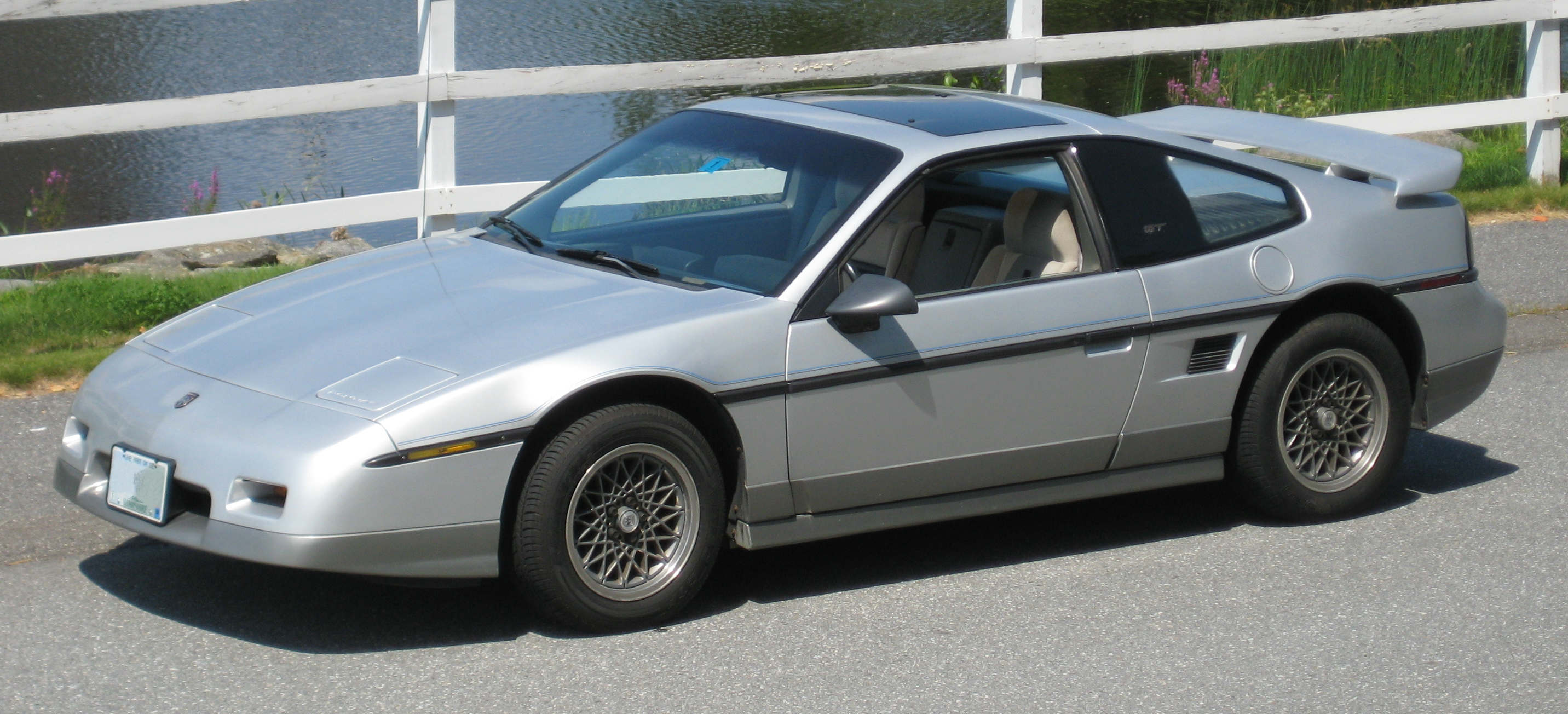
1987 Pontiac Fiero

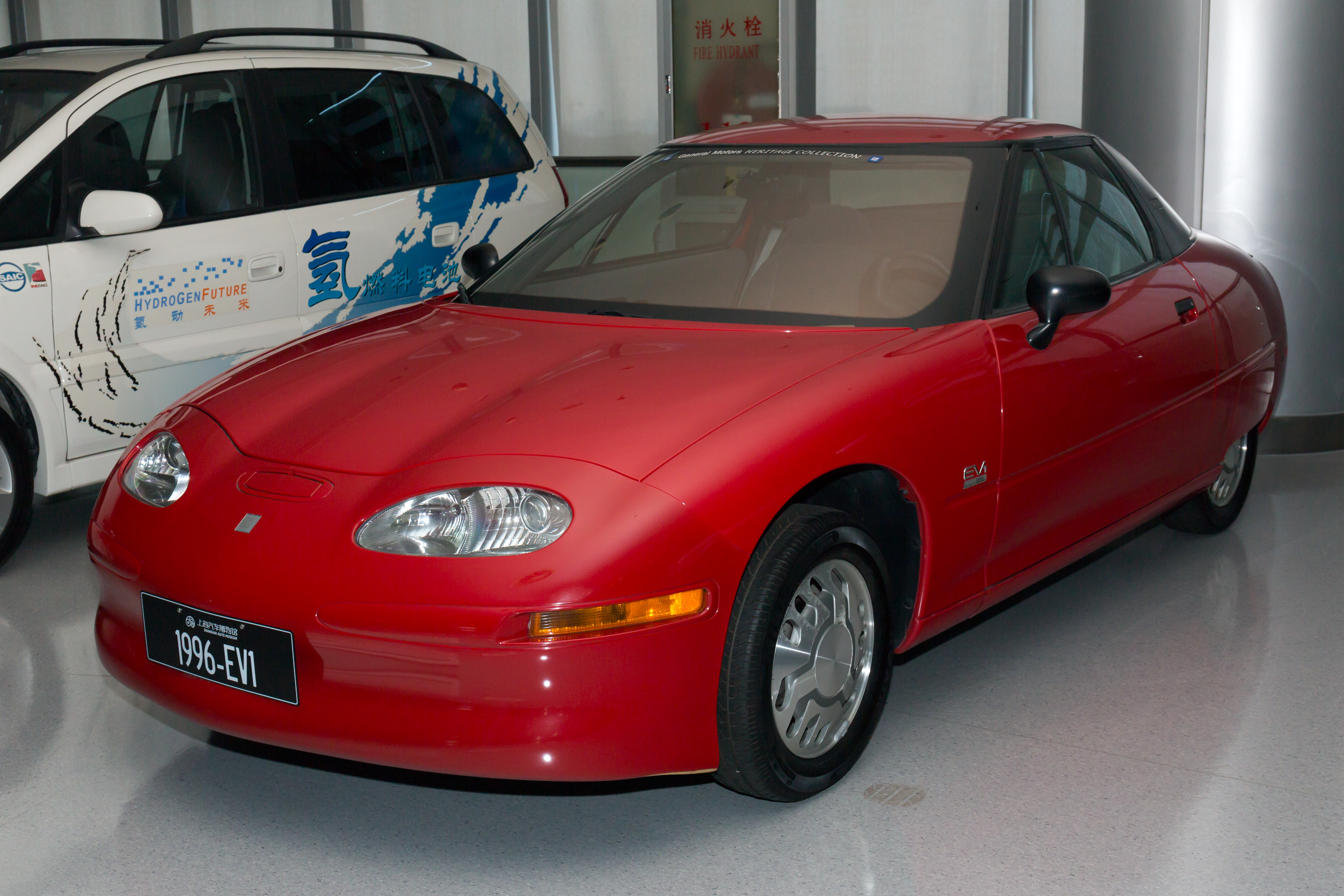
1996 General Motors EV1

== See also ==
- List of General Motors platforms
