= GMT900 =

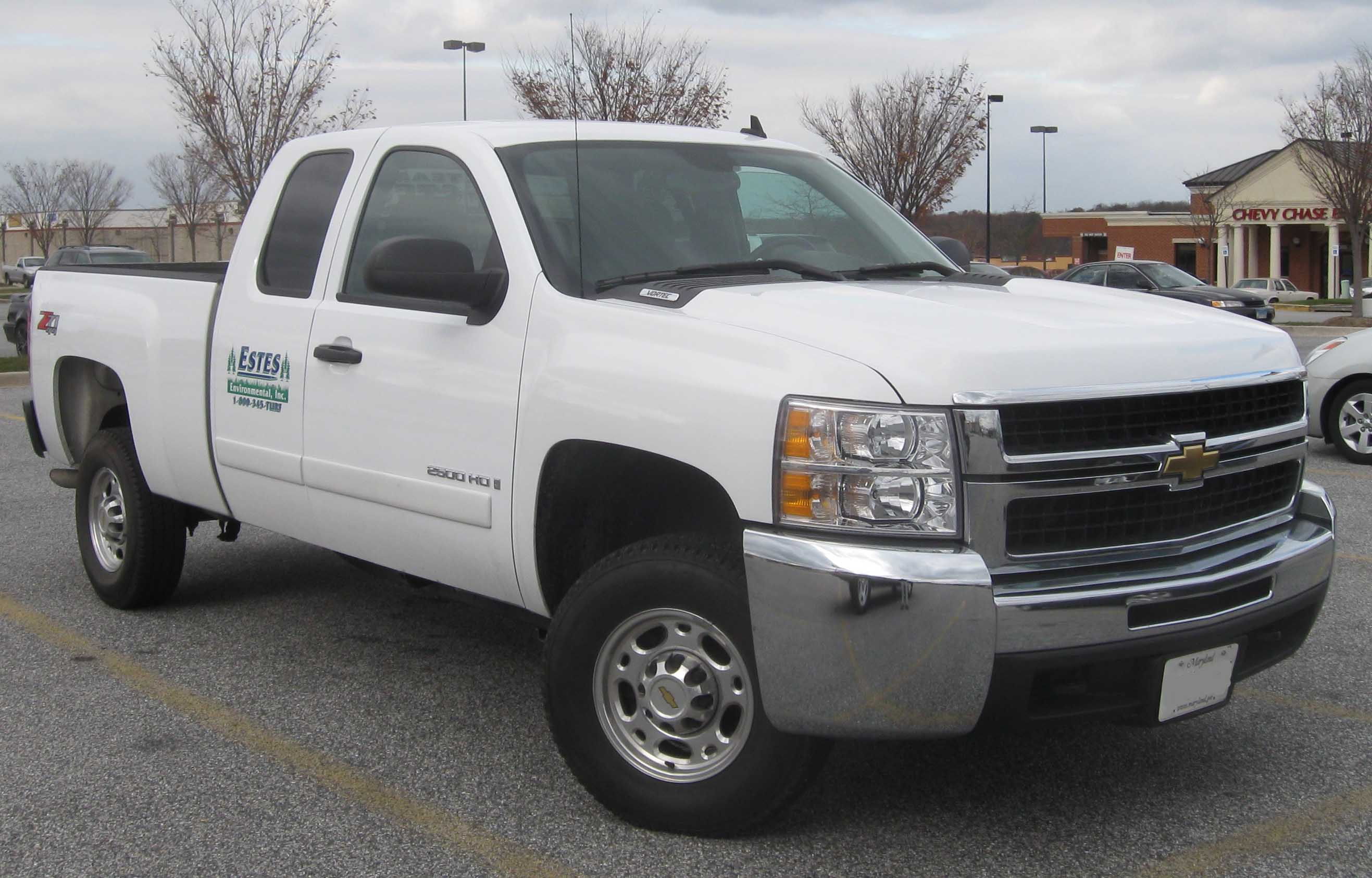

Overview
- Manufacturer: General Motors
- Production: 2006–2013

Body and chassis
- Class: Full-size pickup truck/SUV
- Layout: FR/AWD
- Body styles: 4-door SUV; 4-door extended SUV; 2-door pickup truck 4-door pickup truck

Powertrain
- Engines: 4.3 L Vortec 4300 V6; 4.8 L Vortec 4800 V8; 5.3 L Vortec 5300 V8; 6.0 L Vortec 6000 V8; 6.2 L Vortec 6200 V8
- Transmissions: 4-speed 4L60-E automatic 4-speed 4L65-E automatic 6-speed 6L80 automatic

Dimensions
- Wheelbase: 116.0 in (2,946 mm)

Chronology
- Predecessor: GMT800
- Successor: GMT K2XX

The GMT900 is a General Motors full-size pickup truck and SUV platform used from the 2007 to 2014 model years. The platform was introduced at the 2006 North American International Auto Show, as the replacement for the GMT800 platform. The first GMT900 vehicle introduced was the next-generation Chevrolet Tahoe.

GMT900 had been called a "Hail Mary pass" for the General Motors Corporation—the company needed the revenue from full-size trucks and SUVs to ensure its financial solvency. The company's resources were focused exclusively on GMT900 development through 2005, delaying other programs like the GM Zeta platform. With the 2005 spike in gasoline prices, some analysts have questioned the wisdom of "betting the company" on a line of large trucks. Sales were initially brisk, but later dropped off as the market moved to more fuel-efficient unibody vehicles.

The GMT900 series features standard vehicle stability control. Original plans called for American Axle's "I-Ride" independent suspension module in the rear, but was never used.

Tahoe production began at GM's Arlington Assembly plant in Arlington, Texas, on December 1, 2005, six weeks ahead of schedule. Production of the SWB SUVs (Tahoe/Yukon) began at Janesville Assembly in Janesville, Wisconsin, in early January 2006. Production of long-wheelbase SUVs (Suburban/Yukon XL) began in Janesville and at Silao Assembly in Silao, Guanajuato, in March. The Avalanche was produced only in Silao, and Escalade production began in March 2006, with the ESV being produced in Arlington and the EXT being produced in Silao.

The SUVs began to show up at dealers in January 2006. Sales initially exceeded expectations, but by 2008, General Motors announced it was significantly cutting back production. GM has closed the SUV plant in Janesville, Wisconsin, consolidating SUV production in Arlington, Texas.

The related Silverado and Sierra pickups started production in late 2006. The Hummer H2 was meant to move to the new platform in the next few years, but has since been cancelled (although the engine and gauge cluster shape have been updated for 2008).

Due to a long-lasting downturn in sales of full-size trucks and SUVs in the United States (by as much as 30% through the first nine months of 2008), General Motors cancelled the next-generation full-size truck program in May 2008, including the replacements for the Chevrolet Tahoe and Suburban and their siblings at GMC and Cadillac. The automotive press had speculated that some GMT900 SUV models may move to the GM Lambda platform. However, on January 14, 2010, more than six months after its bankruptcy, General Motors announced that it would resume development of full-size trucks and SUVs.

== Applications ==
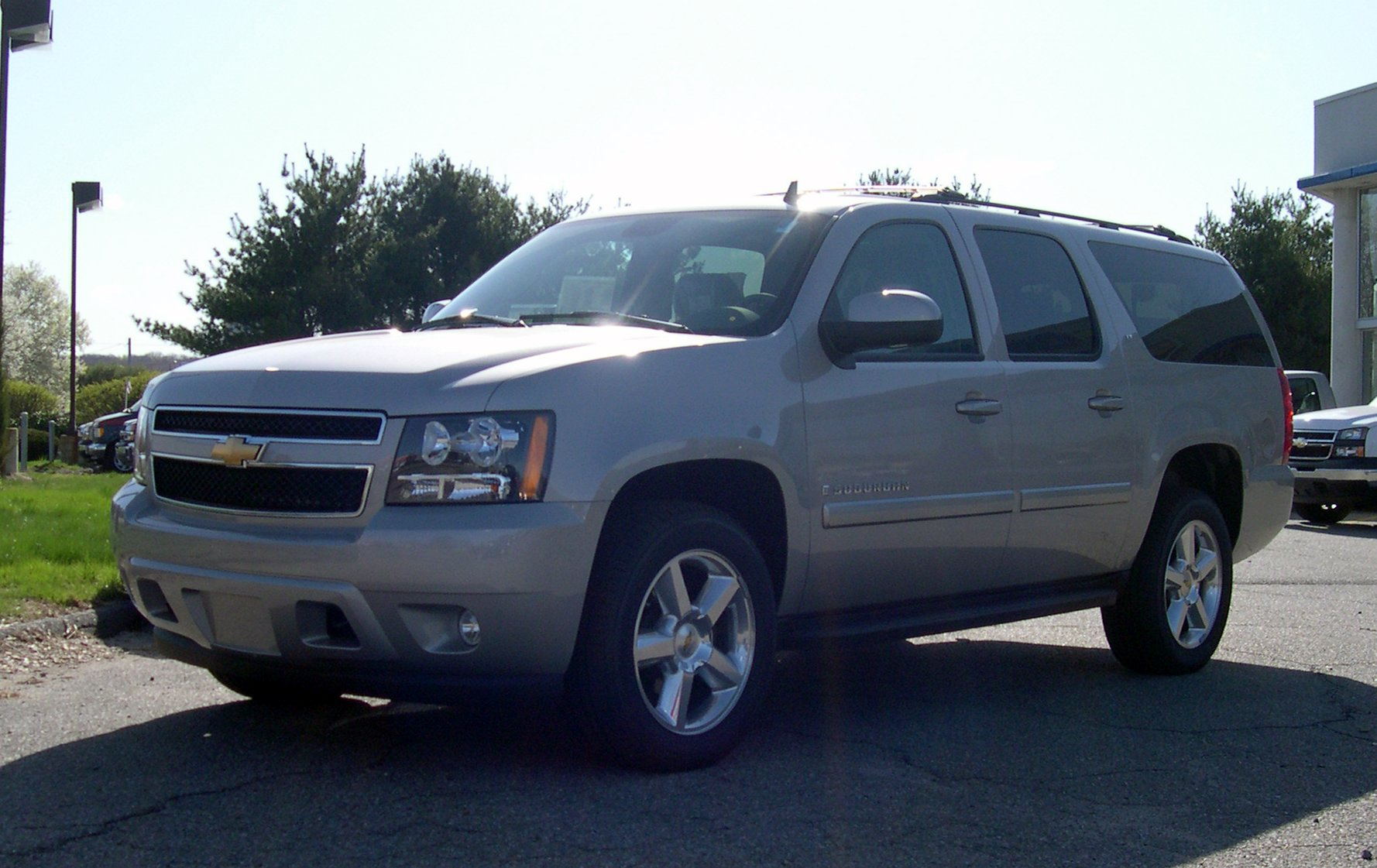
2007 Chevrolet Suburban

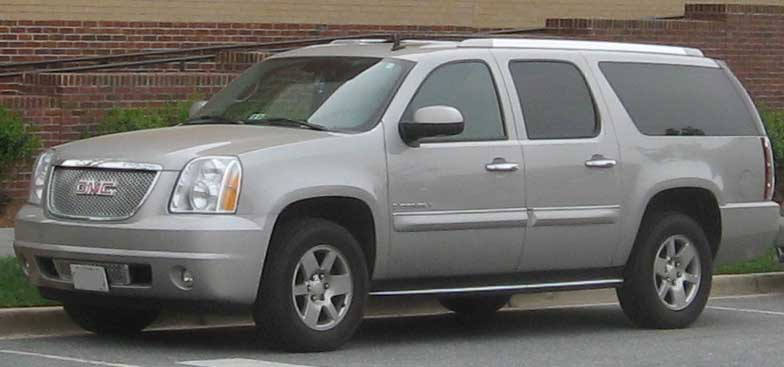
2007 GMC Yukon XL

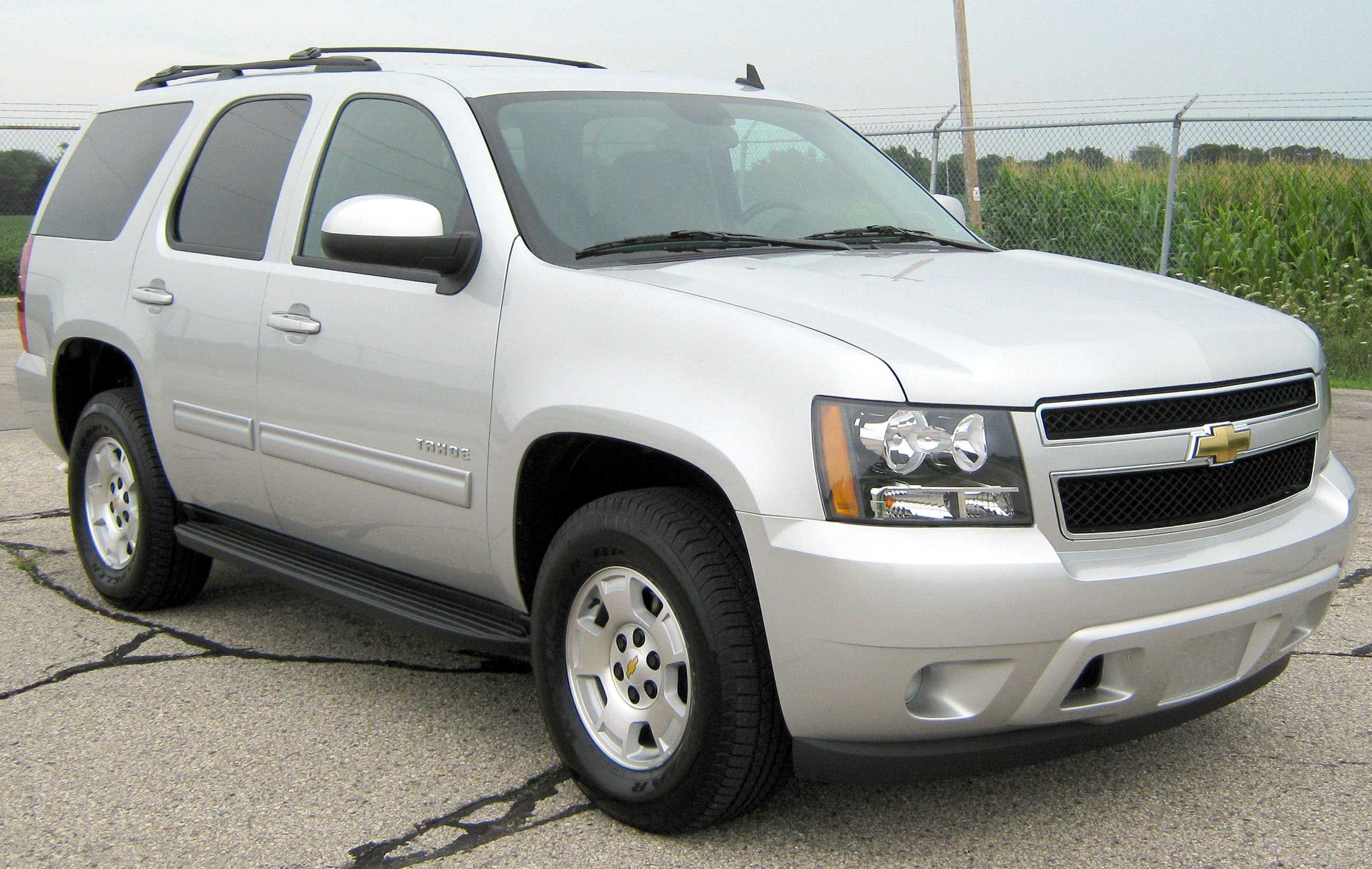
2011 Chevrolet Tahoe

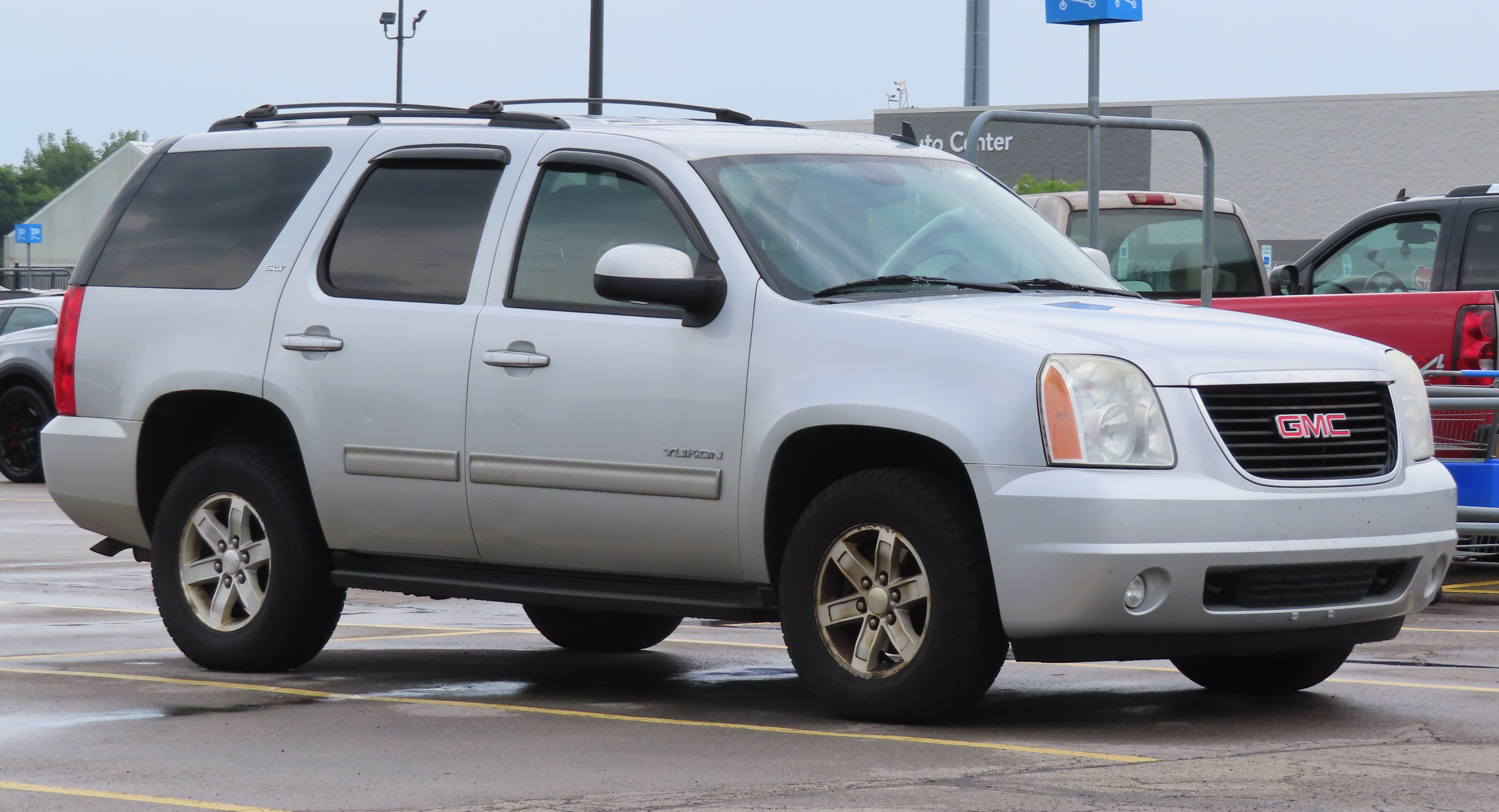
2010 GMC Yukon

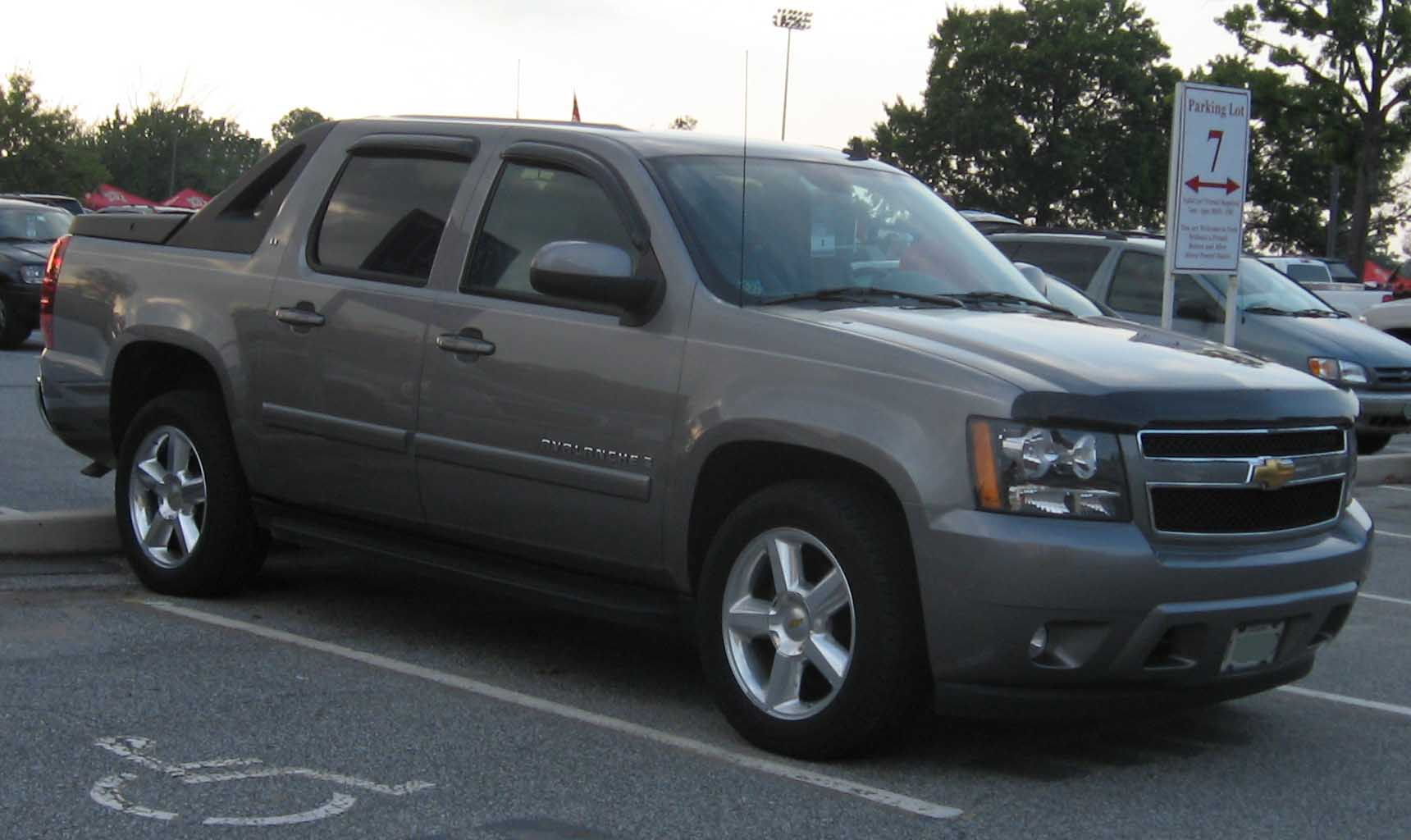
2007 Chevrolet Avalanche

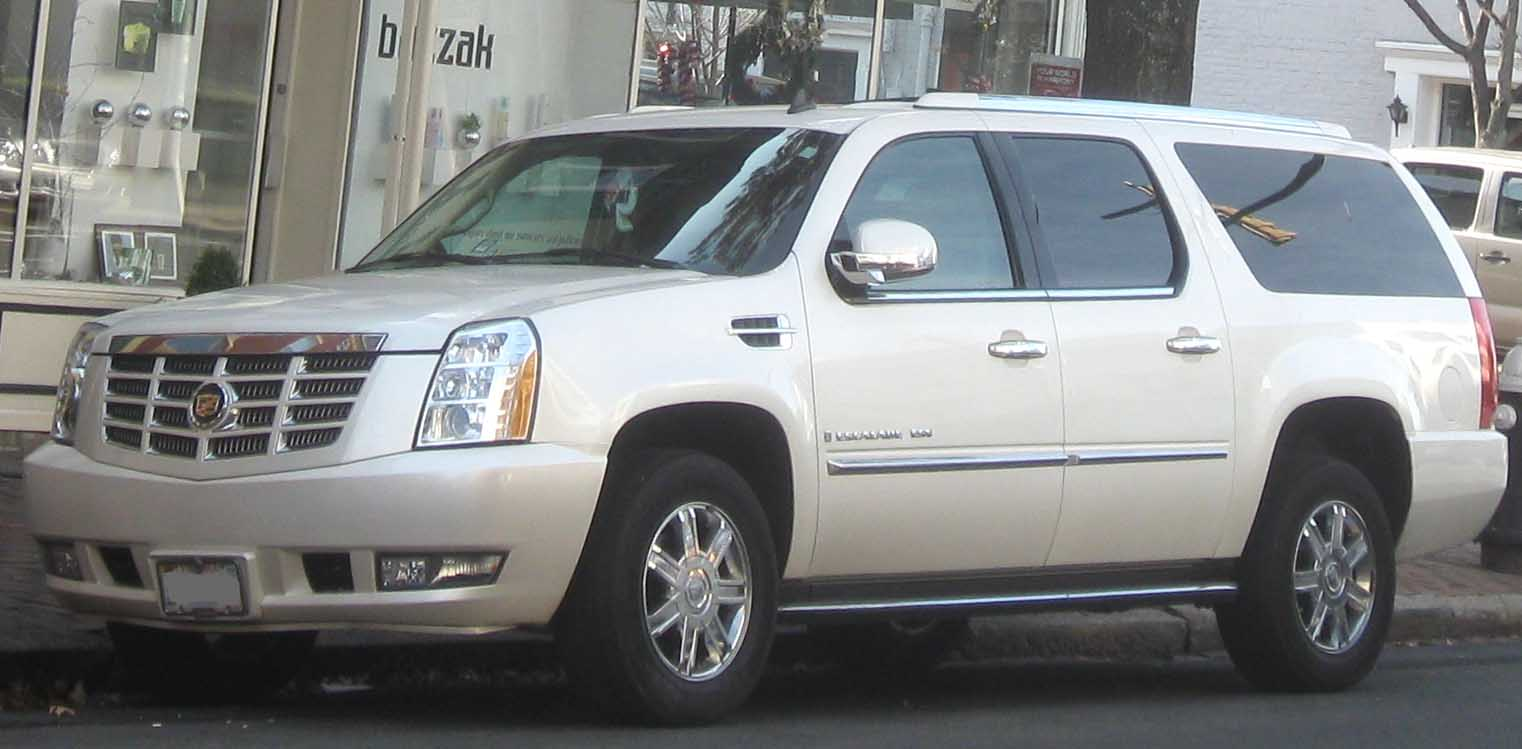
2007 Cadillac Escalade ESV

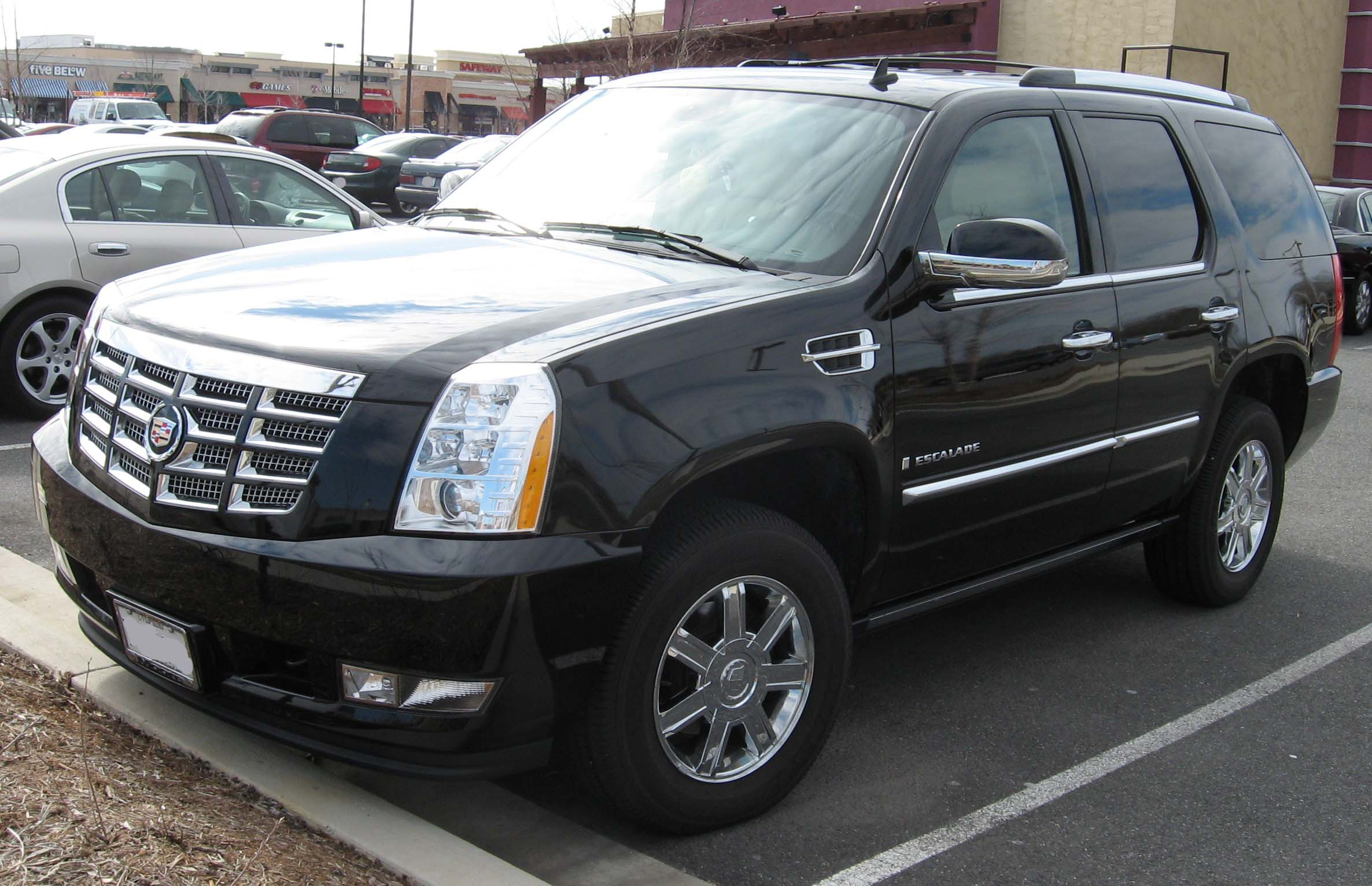
2007 Cadillac Escalade

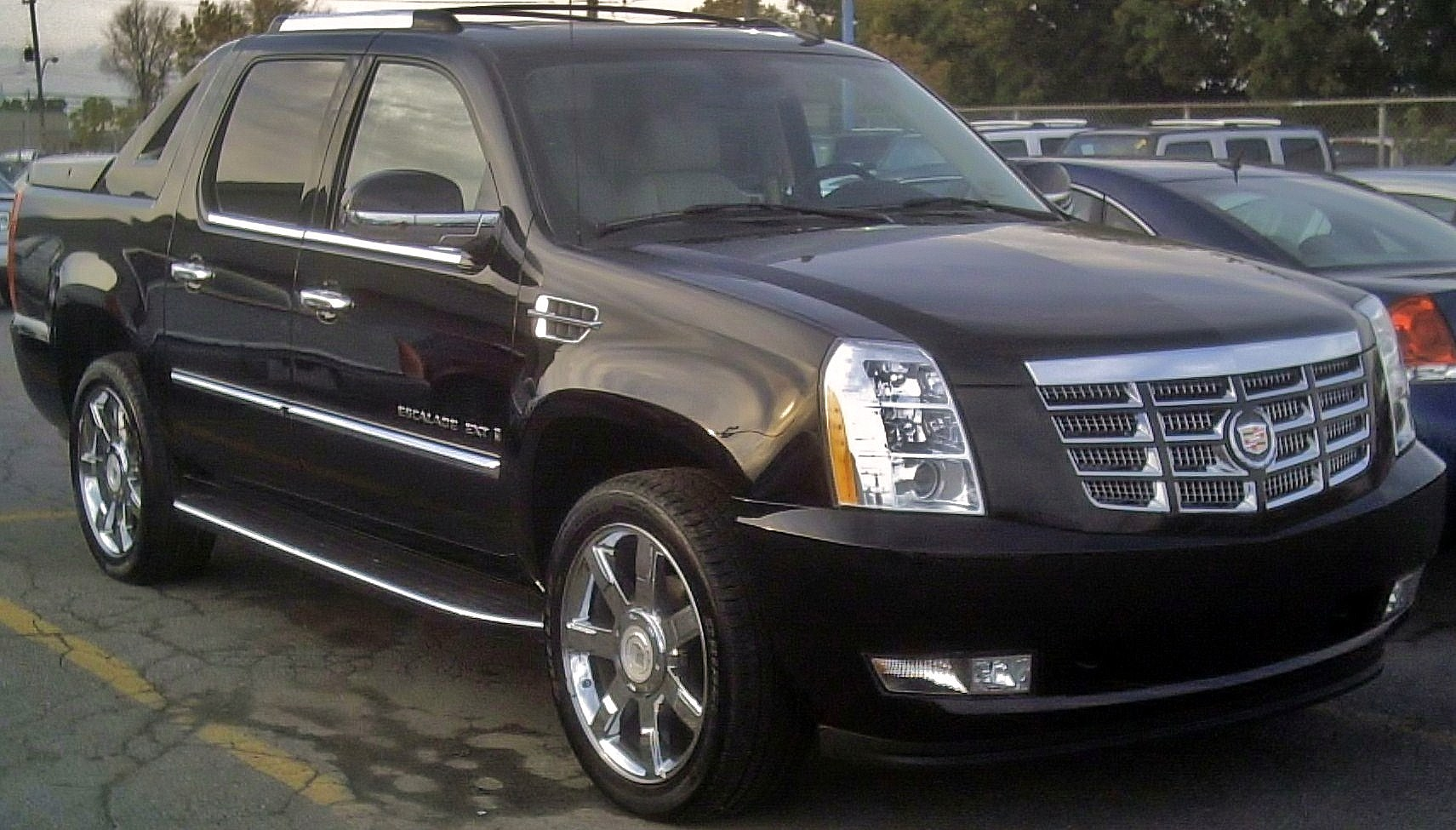
2007 Cadillac Escalade EXT

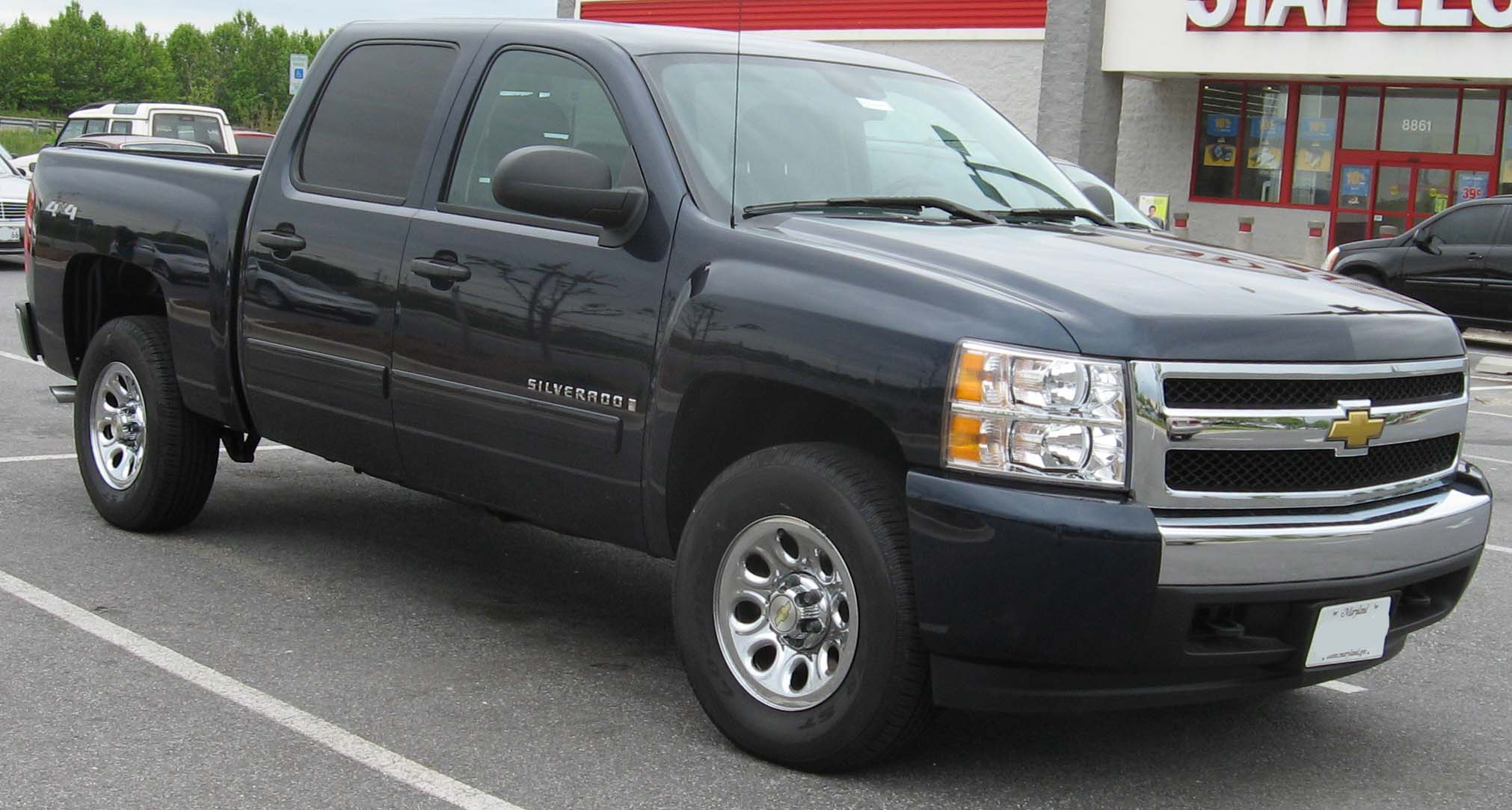
2007 Chevrolet Silverado

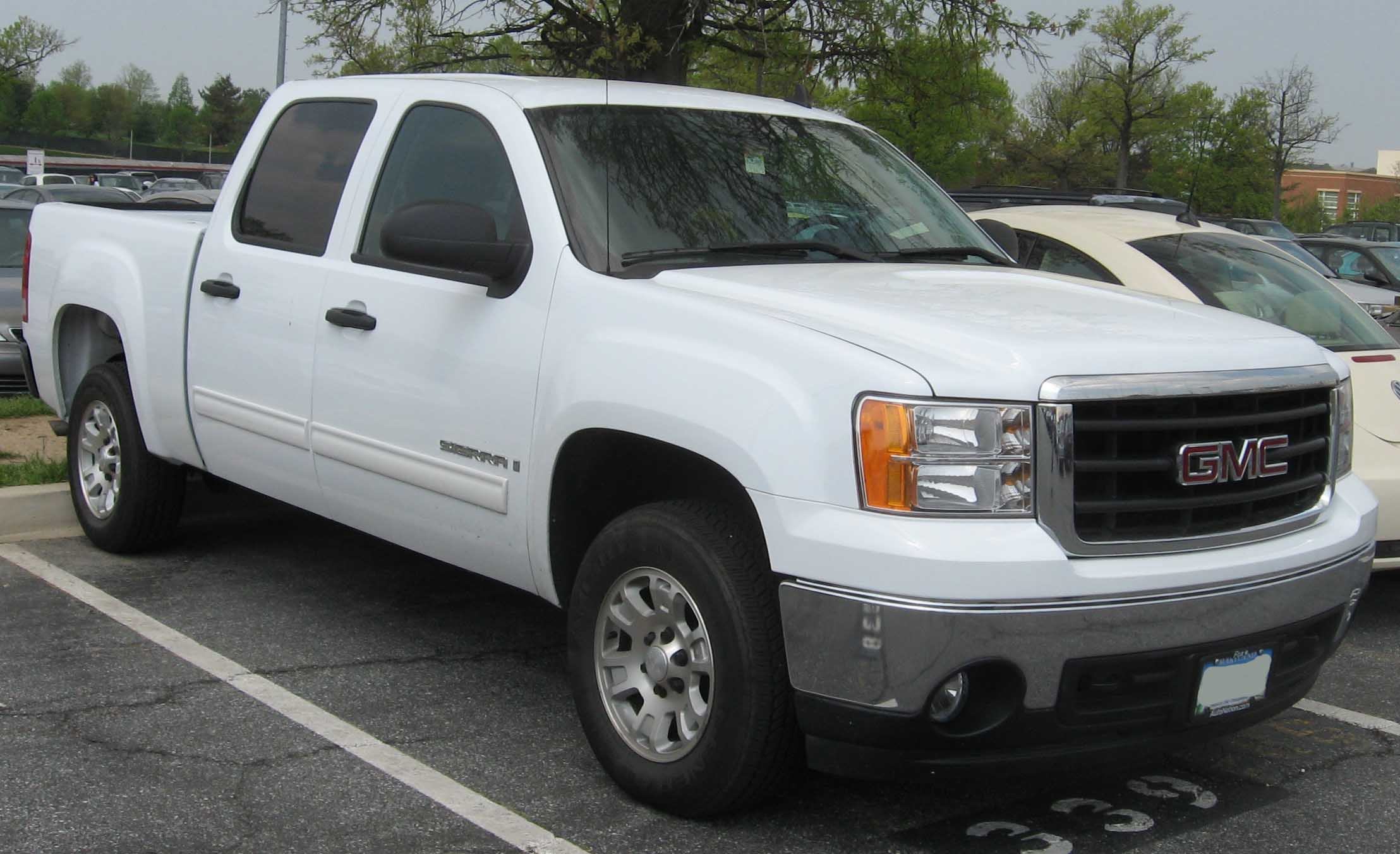
2007 GMC Sierra

Basic platform	Years	Model	Notes	Code	Introduction	Production	Sale
GMT900	2007–2013	Chevrolet Silverado	Regular Cab; Extended Cab; Crew Cab	GMT901	August 2, 2006, at The Texas State Fair	Silao; Fort Wayne; Oshawa August–September 2006; Flint	Fall 2006
GMT900	2007–2013	GMC Sierra	Regular Cab; Extended Cab; Crew Cab	GMT902	August 2, 2006, at The Texas State Fair	Silao; Fort Wayne; Oshawa August–September 2006; Flint	Fall 2006
GMT910	2007–2014	Chevrolet Silverado HD	HD pickup	GMT911			
GMT910	2007–2014	GMC Sierra HD	HD pickup	GMT912			
GMT920	2007–2014	Chevrolet Tahoe	4-door SUV	GMT921	NAIAS January 2006	Arlington December 1, 2005; Janesville early 2006	January 2006
GMT920	2007–2014	GMC Yukon	4-door SUV	GMT922	NAIAS January 2006	Arlington December 1, 2005; Janesville early 2006	January 2006
GMT920	2007–2014	Cadillac Escalade	4-door SUV	GMT926	NAIAS January 2006	Arlington January 1, 2006	January 2006
GMT930	2007–2014	Chevrolet Suburban	4-door extended SUV	GMT931	GLAAS January 2006	Janesville March 2006; Silao March 2006; Arlington 2006	April 2006
GMT930	2007–2014	GMC Yukon XL	4-door extended SUV	GMT932	GLAAS January 2006	Janesville March 2006; Silao March 2006; Arlington 2006	April 2006
GMT930	2007–2014	Cadillac Escalade ESV	4-door extended SUV	GMT936		Arlington March 2006	May 2006
GMT940	2007–2013	Chevrolet Avalanche	4-door pickup/SUV	GMT941	CAS February 2006	Silao	
GMT940	2007–2013	Cadillac Escalade EXT	4-door pickup/SUV	GMT946		Silao March 2006	May 2006

== See also ==
- List of General Motors platforms

== See also ==
- GM GMT platform
