= GMT800 =

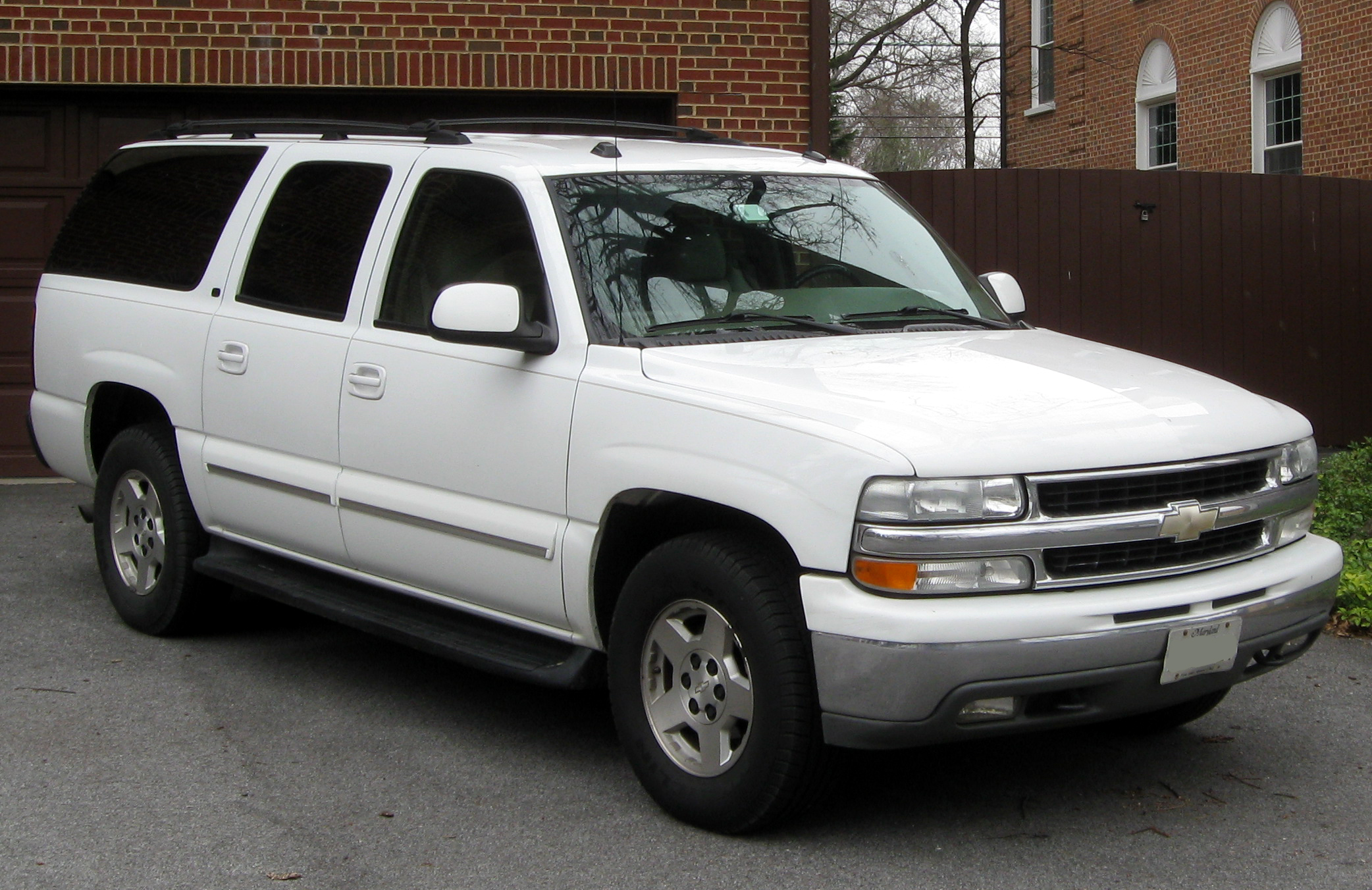
- 2004–2006 Chevrolet Suburban 1500 Pictured March 2012

Overview
- Manufacturer: General Motors
- Production: 1998–2009

Body and chassis
- Class: Full-size Pickup/SUV
- Layout: FR/Four-wheel drive
- Body styles: 4-door sport utility vehicle 4-door extended sport utility vehicle 2-door pickup truck 4-door pickup truck

Powertrain
- Engines: 4.3 L V6; 4.8 L V8; 5.3 L V8; 5.7 L V8 (Mexico only 1999–2002); 6.0 L V8; 8.1 L V8; 6.6 L V8 Turbo Diesel

Chronology
- Predecessor: GMT400
- Successor: GMT900

The GMT800 was a General Motors full-size truck platform used from the 1999 through 2007(09) model years. It is the foundation for the Chevrolet Silverado and GMC Sierra pickups; and the derivative GMT820 and GMT830 versions for the Chevrolet Tahoe/GMC Yukon and the Chevrolet Suburban/GMC Yukon XL full-size SUVs, respectively. This platform was the successor to the GMT400 series of C/K pickups and SUVs, and was replaced for 2007 by the GMT900 line.

The GMT800 frames were manufactured by Magna International in Ramos Arizpe, Coahuila, Mexico; and St. Thomas, Ontario, Canada. Trucks were assembled in Oshawa, Ontario; Pontiac, Michigan; Fort Wayne, Indiana; Flint, Michigan; and Silao, Mexico; for pickup and chassis cab models, and Silao, Mexico; Janesville, Wisconsin; and Arlington, Texas; for SUV models. The GMT820-based Hummer H2 was built under contract by AM General at a specially-constructed plant in Mishawaka, Indiana. A GMT810 two-door SUV variant was designed and prototyped, but was not put into production.

The GMT800 introduced a three-section frame system. This could be mixed and matched depending on the wheelbase, GVWR, and body type fitted to the platform, rather than a single-piece long frame. The front section was hydroformed, while the middle and rear sections were roll formed or stamped, depending on application. This gives greater flexibility to the platform. A total of four front modules, seven midsections, and four rear sections were designed, and supported nearly 40 truck configurations.

All models featured an independent front suspension. Torsion bars were used on all 4WD models, plus all 2WD 1500-series SUVs and 1500HD/2500HD/3500 pickup and chassis-cab models. On 2WD models, coil springs were used on most 1500-series pickups and all 1999–2000 2500-series models. The GMT800 pickup models used a rear leaf-spring suspension, while the GMT820/830 SUV models used a five-link coil-spring suspension. (The 2500-series GMT830 SUV models retained a leaf spring suspension.)

The GMT800 was the first truck application for the then-new GM Generation III V8 engines. The 4.8 L and 5.3 L versions used iron blocks and aluminum heads, while the 1999–2000 6.0 L version used cast iron cylinder heads. The 6.6 L Duramax turbo-diesel was introduced with the 2500HD and 3500 models that debuted for 2001. An aluminum-block 5.3 L version was also used in 2005–2007 1500-series 4WD extended-cab 6.5' box trucks.

The GMT800 1500 Chevrolet Silverado was named the MotorTrend Truck of the Year for 1999, the 2500 HD was awarded Truck of the Year for 2001, and the Chevrolet Avalanche was the Truck of the Year for 2002.

== Sales ==
Year	1999	2000	2001	2002	2003	2004	2005
Total sales	TBD	TBD	1,569,198	1,672,804	1,810,340	1,704,239	1,491,084

== Applications ==
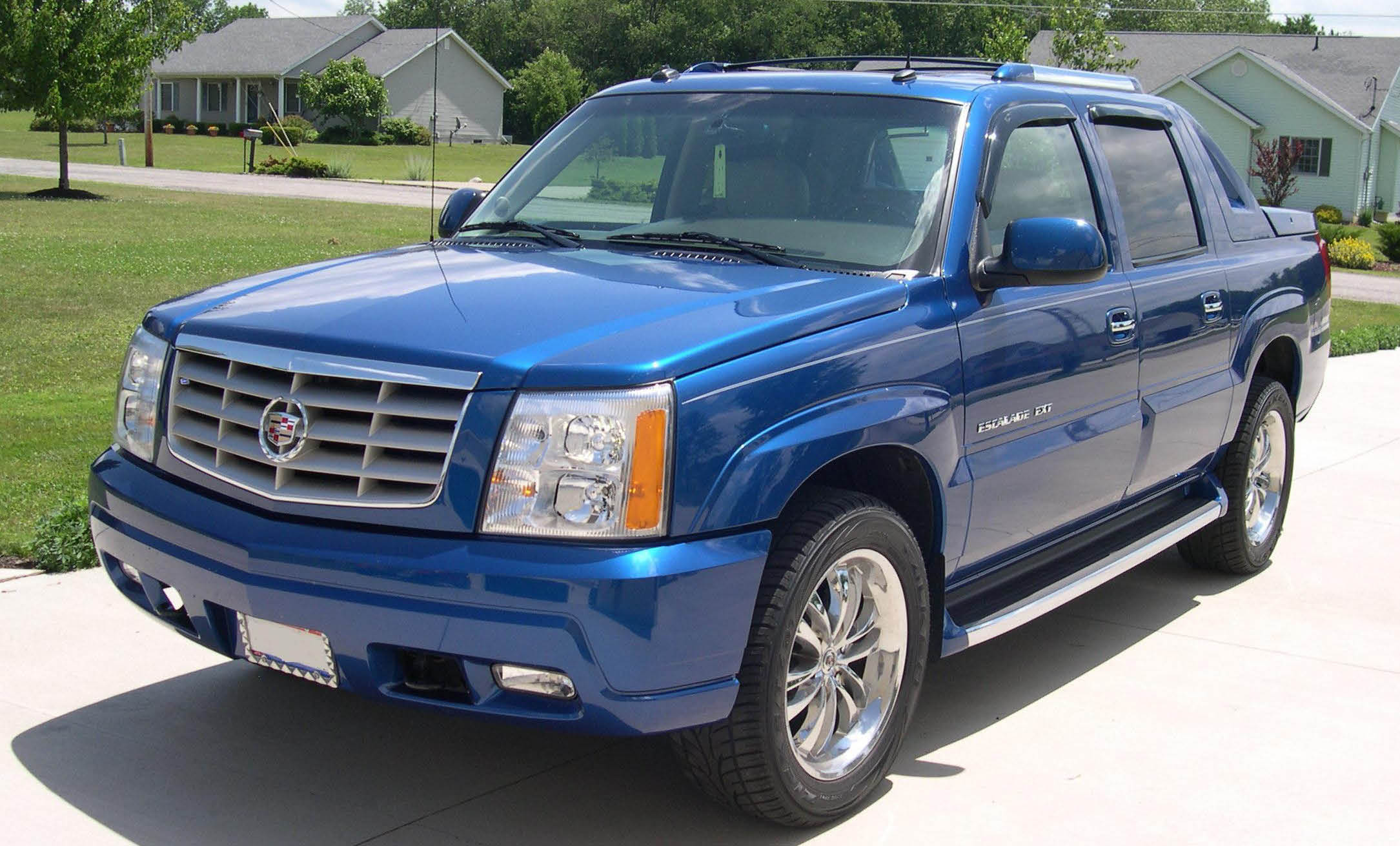
2003 Cadillac Escalade EXT

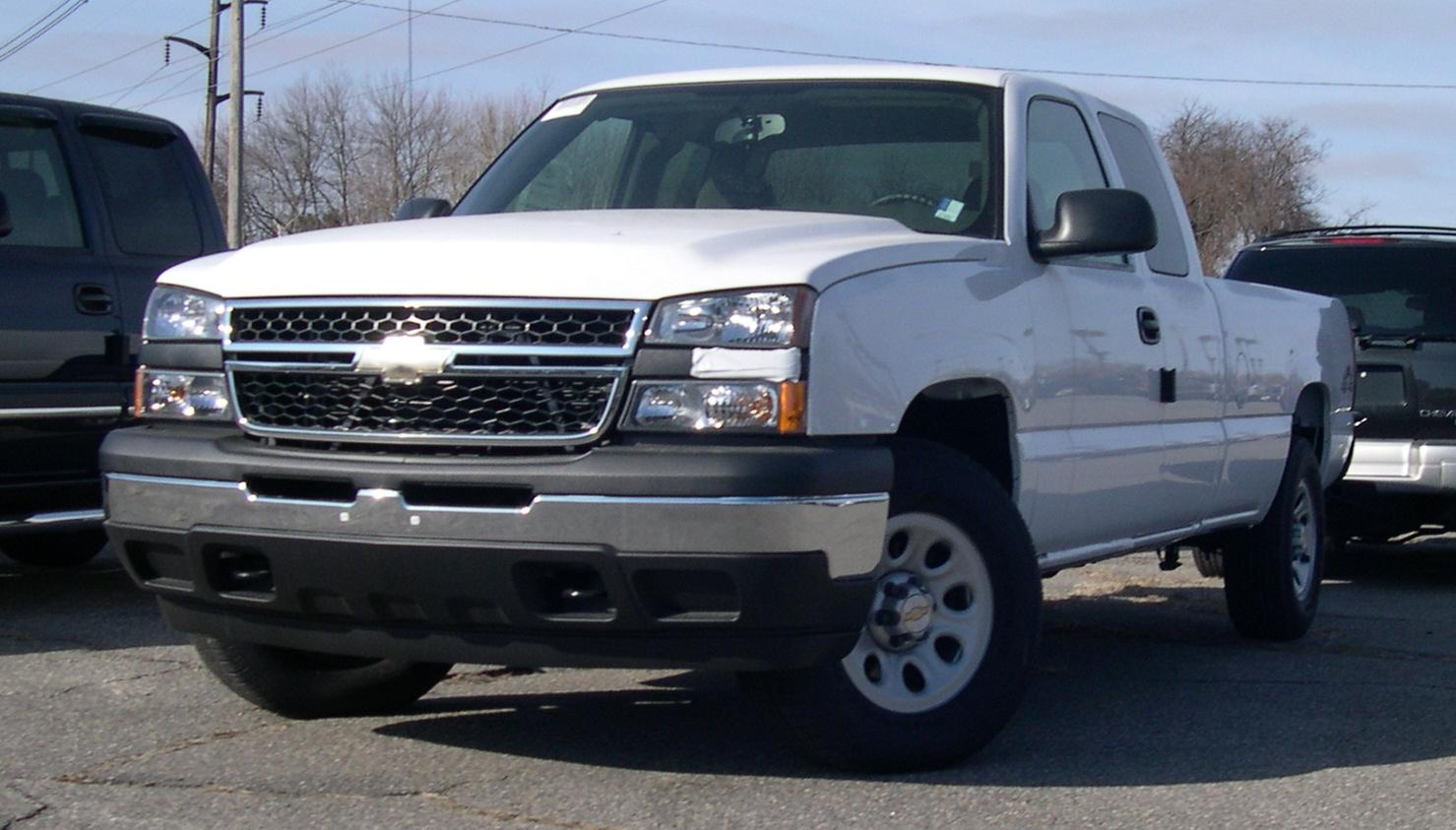
2006 Chevrolet Silverado 1500 Extended Cab 8' box 4WD

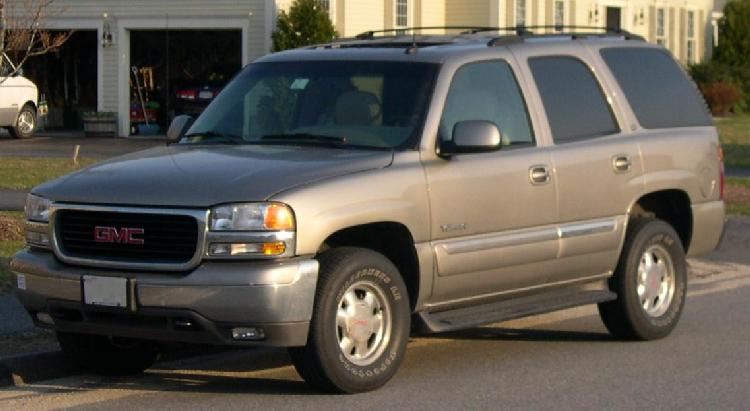
2004 GMC Yukon

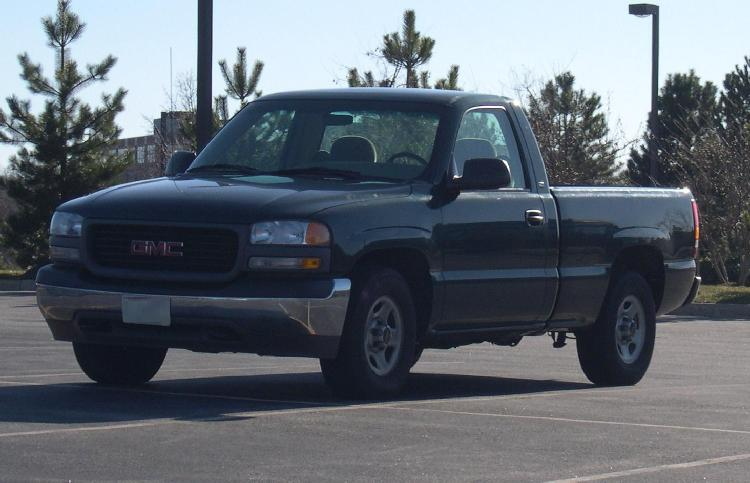
2002 GMC Sierra 1500 Regular Cab 6.5' box 2WD

Basic platform	Model Years	Model	Notes
GMT800/880	1999–2007	Chevrolet Silverado	The 2007 models were referred to as the Silverado Classic and Sierra Classic, to disambiguate from the GMT900 counterparts.
GMT800/880	1999–2007	GMC Sierra	The 2007 models were referred to as the Silverado Classic and Sierra Classic, to disambiguate from the GMT900 counterparts.
GMT820	2002–2006	Cadillac Escalade	
GMT820	2000–2006	Chevrolet Tahoe	
GMT820	2000–2006	GMC Yukon	
GMT820	2003–2009	Hummer H2	A unique platform (GMT825), the front used a modified 2500-series SUV frame, and the midsection was all-new and completely boxed. The rear section used a 1500-series frame that is modified for the 8,600-pound GVWR.
GMT830	2003–2006	Cadillac Escalade ESV	
GMT830	2000–2006	Chevrolet Suburban	
GMT830	2000–2006	GMC Yukon XL	
GMT805	2002–2006	Chevrolet Avalanche	
GMT806	2002–2006	Cadillac Escalade EXT	

== See also ==
- List of General Motors platforms
- General Motors GMT platform
