= GMT400 =

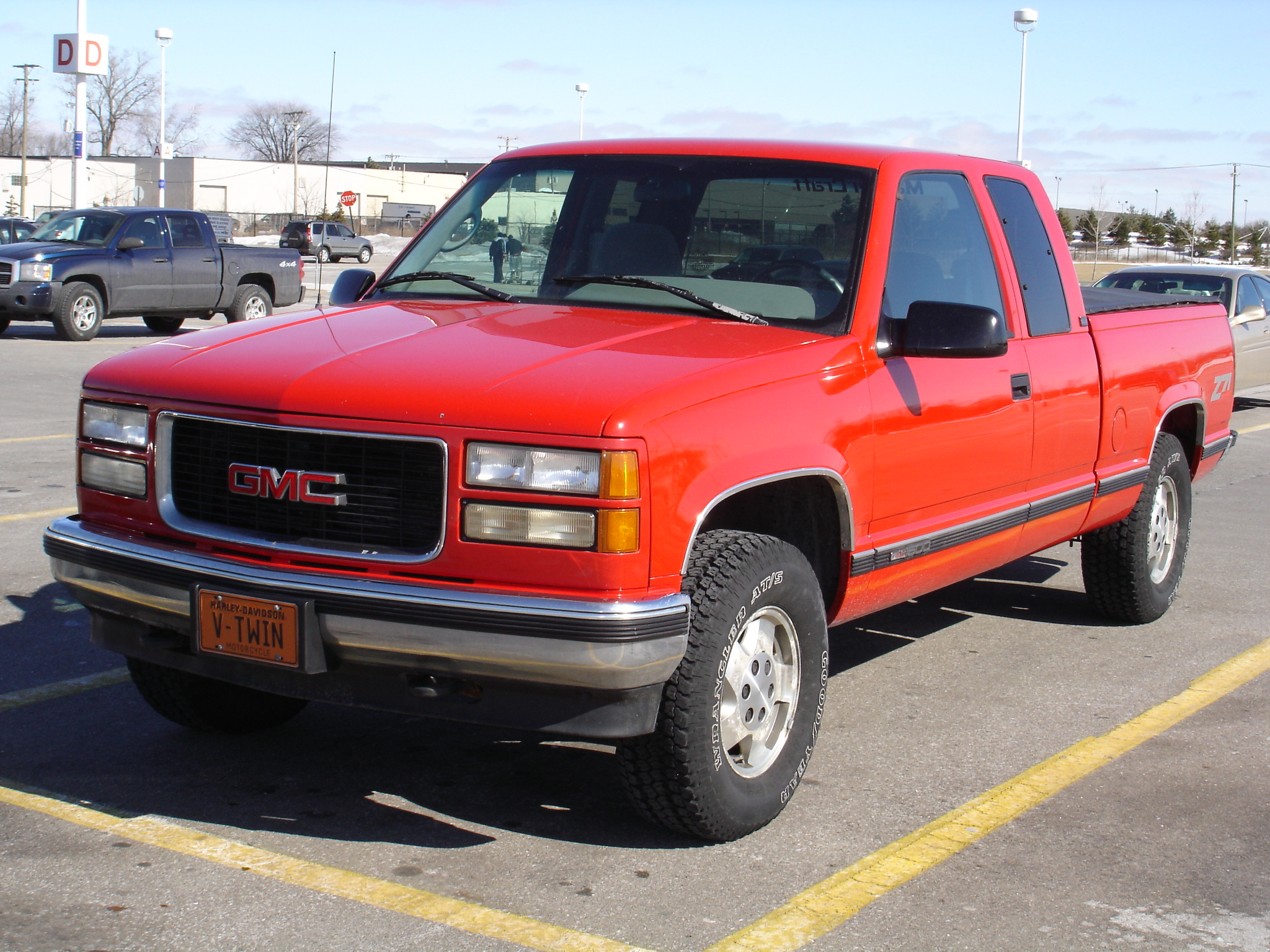
- GMT400 GMC Sierra

Overview
- Manufacturer: General Motors
- Production: 1988–2006

Body and chassis
- Class: Full-size truck
- Layout: FR/4WD
- Body styles: 4-door SUV; 2-door SUV; 4-door extended SUV; 2-door pickup truck 4-door pickup truck

Chronology
- Predecessor: C/K Series
- Successor: GMT800

The GMT 400 and similar GMT 480 was the platform used for the Chevrolet C/K and GMC Sierra full-size pickup trucks beginning with the 1988 model year. The GMT 410, GMT 420, GMT 425, and GMT 430 variants were derived for full-size SUVs, including the 1992–1994 Chevrolet Blazer and 1995–2000 Tahoe, and the GMC Yukon from late 1991 to 2000.

This was the first GMT designation for the C (RWD) and K (4WD/AWD) series full-size trucks and SUVs.

The engineering for the GMT400 was done by the GM Truck & Bus group, working primarily out of a rented facility at Pioneer Engineering on 9 mile Road in Warren, MI.

GMT 400 frames were built by A.O. Smith Automotive Products, Dana Holding Corporation, and Tower Automotive.

Engines included the gasoline 4.3 L V6, 5.0 L V8, 5.7 L V8, 7.4 L V8, and diesel 6.2 L and 6.5 L V8s. Throttle-body injection (TBI) was used on gas engines through 1995. Central point injection (CPI) was used on the 1996–2000 4.3 L, 5.0 L, and 5.7 L engines, while the 1996–2000 7.4 L V8 used sequential fuel injection (SFI).

The GMT400 series was replaced by the GMT800 vehicles beginning in 1998 (for the 1999 model year). The GMT400 remained in production, with the lineup slowly pared down until the last models were discontinued in 2002 in the US with C3500HD being produced for Mexico until 2006. The GMT400 truck models were built at Ft. Wayne, Indiana; Pontiac, Michigan; Flint, Michigan; Oshawa, Ontario, Canada; and SUVs at Janesville, Wisconsin and Arlington, Texas.

== Applications ==
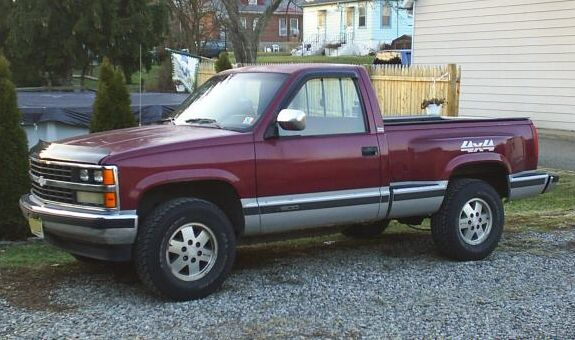
1988 Chevy K1500 Scottsdale 4x4 regular cab Sportside

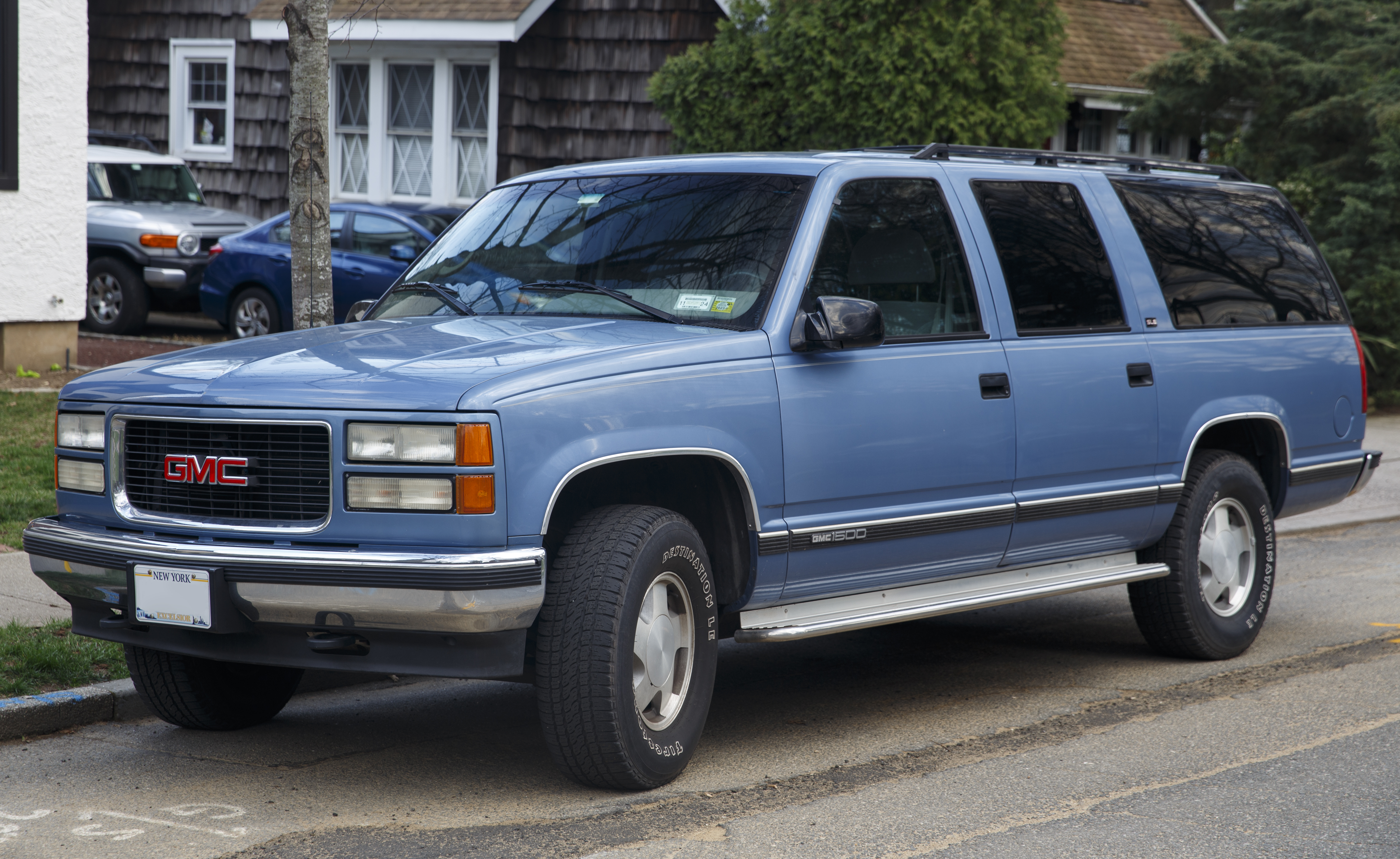
1995 GMC Suburban 1500 4x4

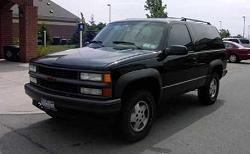
1995 Chevrolet Tahoe

Basic platform	Model years	Model	Notes
GMT400/480	1988–2000	Chevrolet C/K	2500 and 3500 only for 2000
GMT400/480	1988–2000	GMC Sierra	2500 and 3500 only for 2000
GMT410	1992–1999	Chevrolet Suburban	
GMT415	1992–1994	Chevrolet Full-Size Blazer	
GMT420	1995–2000	Chevrolet Tahoe	
GMT425	1992–1999	GMC Suburban	
GMT430	1992–2000	GMC Yukon	
GMT435	1999–2000	Cadillac Escalade	
GMT455	1992–2006	Chevrolet/GMC C3500 HD	2002 being the last year for US market and 2006 for Mexico market

== See also ==
- GM GMT platform
- GMT400.com an online forum for the 88-98 body style GM trucks
