= GM4200 platform =

GM 4200 platform
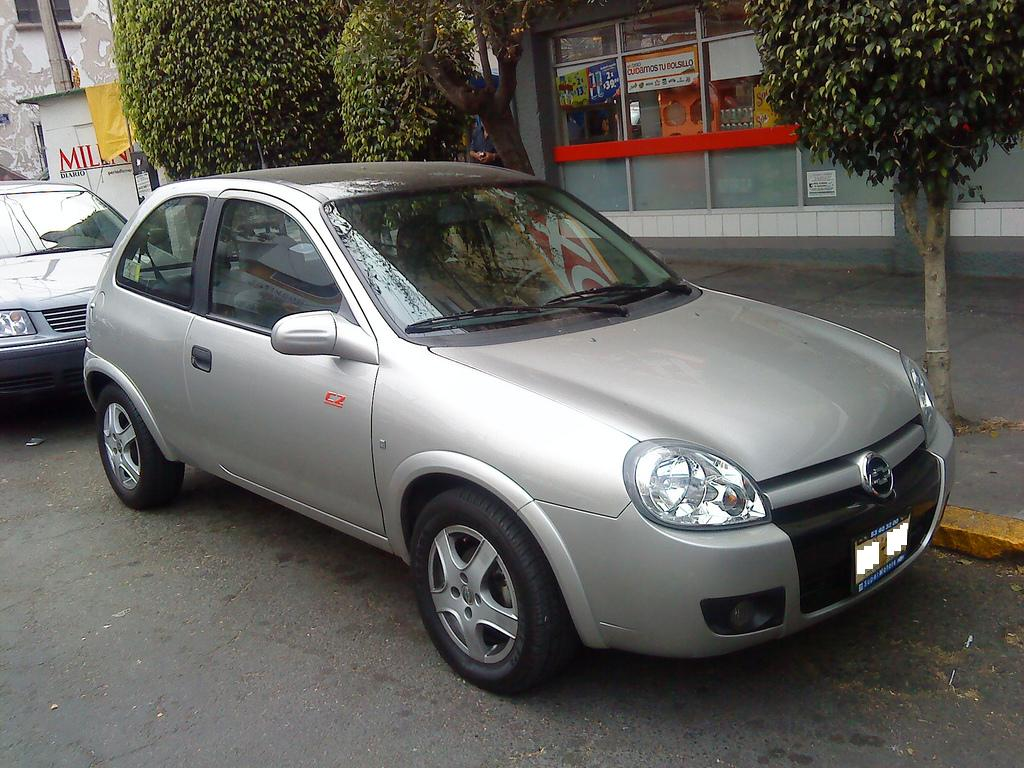
- Chevrolet Chevy

Overview
- Parent company: General Motors
- Also called: S-car
- Production: 1982–2021

Body and chassis
- Class: Subcompact (B)
- Layout: Transverse front-engine, front-wheel drive
- Body styles: 2-door convertible; 2-door Coupé; 2-door coupé utility; 3-door hatchback; 4-door sedan; 5-door hatchback; 5-door station wagon

Chronology
- Predecessor: GM M platform
- Successor: GM Gamma platform

General Motors introduced the front-wheel drive GM4200 platform in 1982 with the introductions of two subcompacts, the Opel Corsa A and the Vauxhall Nova. It was originally known as the S-car. The platform was also used by Holden, Chevrolet's Latin American branch, and Buick of China. The platform was still in use until 2021 by Chevrolet's Latin American branch for their entry-level models. This platform became very popular in Mexico in 1994, when the model renamed Chevy Swing (4 door) and Chevy Joy (2 door) was imported from Spain. In 1996, the models were built in Mexico and several variants were offered: a 4-door sedan (called Monza), a 2- and a 4-door hatchback, a pickup truck, and a station wagon (imported from Chile). The popular Chevy went on with cosmetic changes (the C2, introduced in 2004), that included changes to the front end and dashboard, and another redesign in 2009. It was retired after the 2011 model year.

== Models ==
- 2009–2016 Chevrolet Agile (Mercosul)
- 2006–2012 Chevrolet Prisma
- 2002–2016 Chevrolet Classic
- 2000–2015 Chevrolet Celta
- 1993–2001 Chevrolet Corsa
- 1994–2012 Chevrolet Chevy (Mexico Only)
- 2001–2010 Buick Sail (Later Chevrolet Sail)
- 1993–2000 Holden Barina
- 1983–1992 Opel Corsa A
- 1993–2000 Opel Corsa B
- 1994–2000 Opel Tigra A
- 1993–2000 Opel Vita
- 1993–2000 Vauxhall Corsa
- 1983–1992 Vauxhall Nova
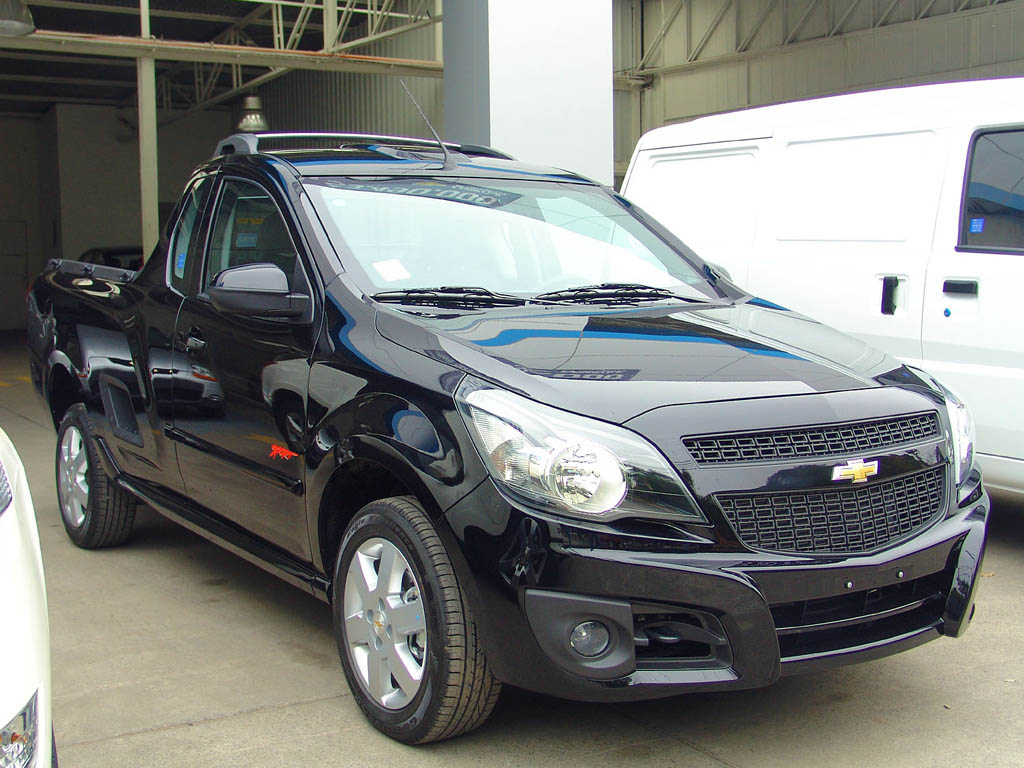
Chevrolet Montana

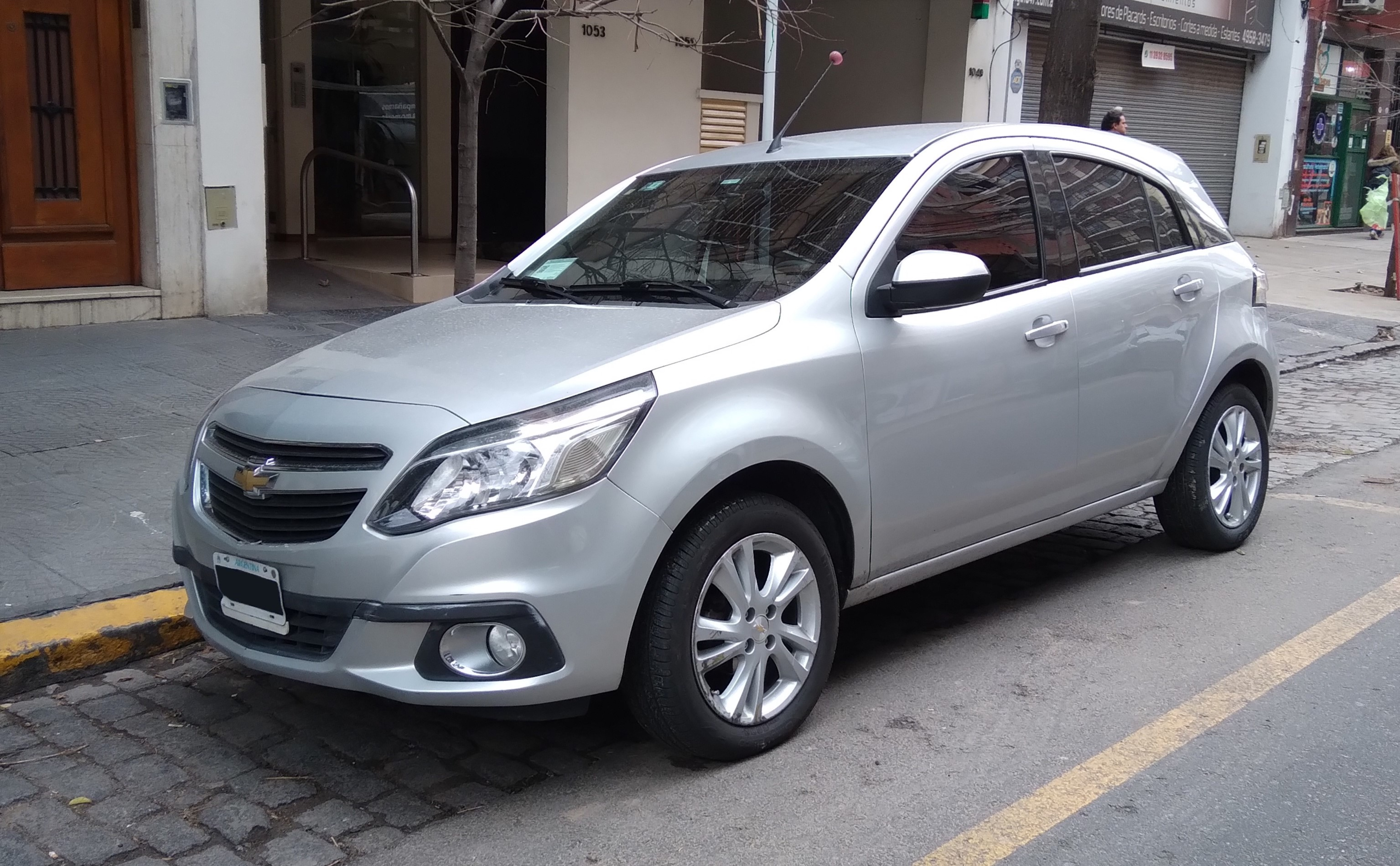
Chevrolet Agile

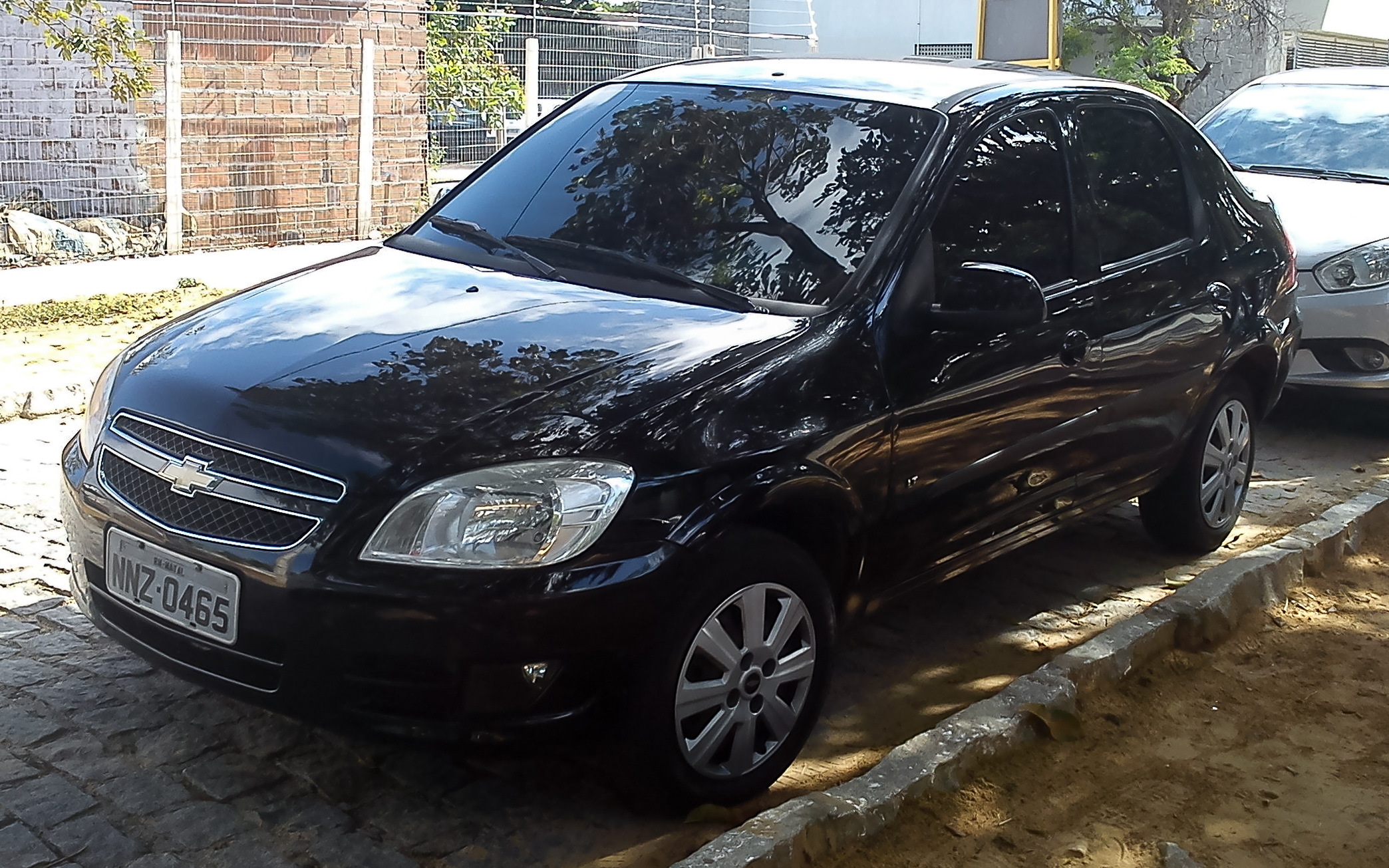
Chevrolet Prisma

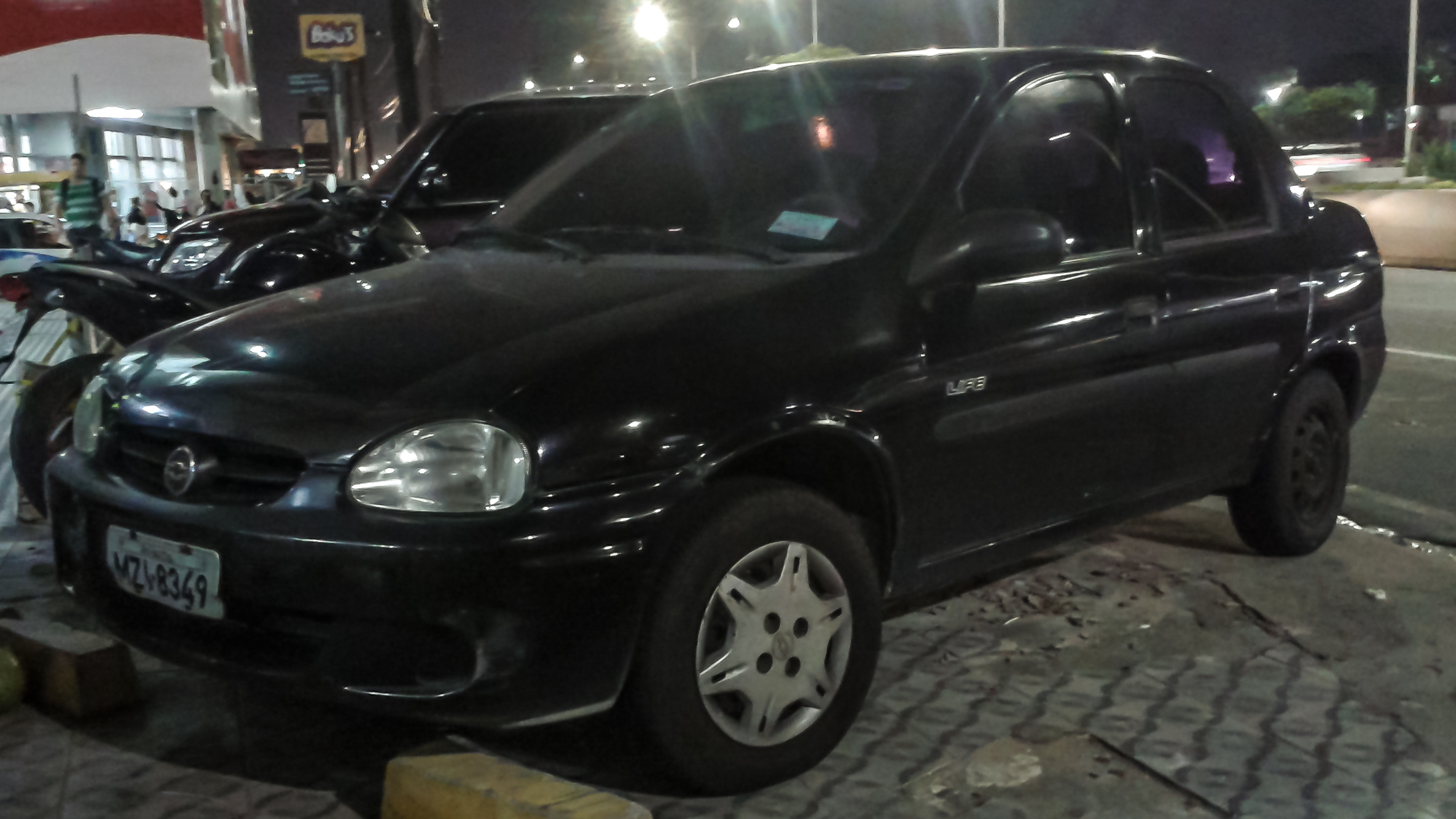
Chevrolet Classic

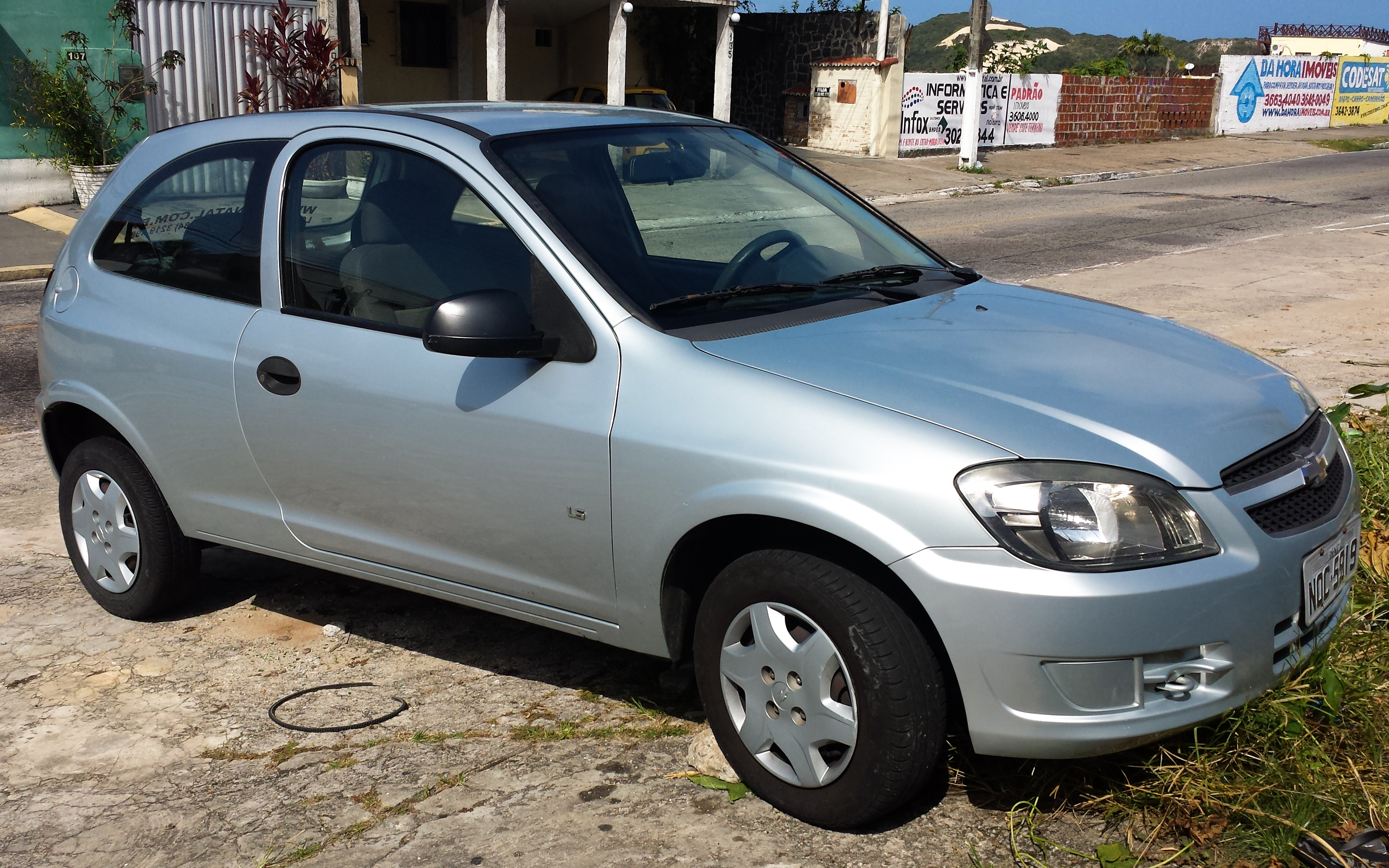
Chevrolet Celta

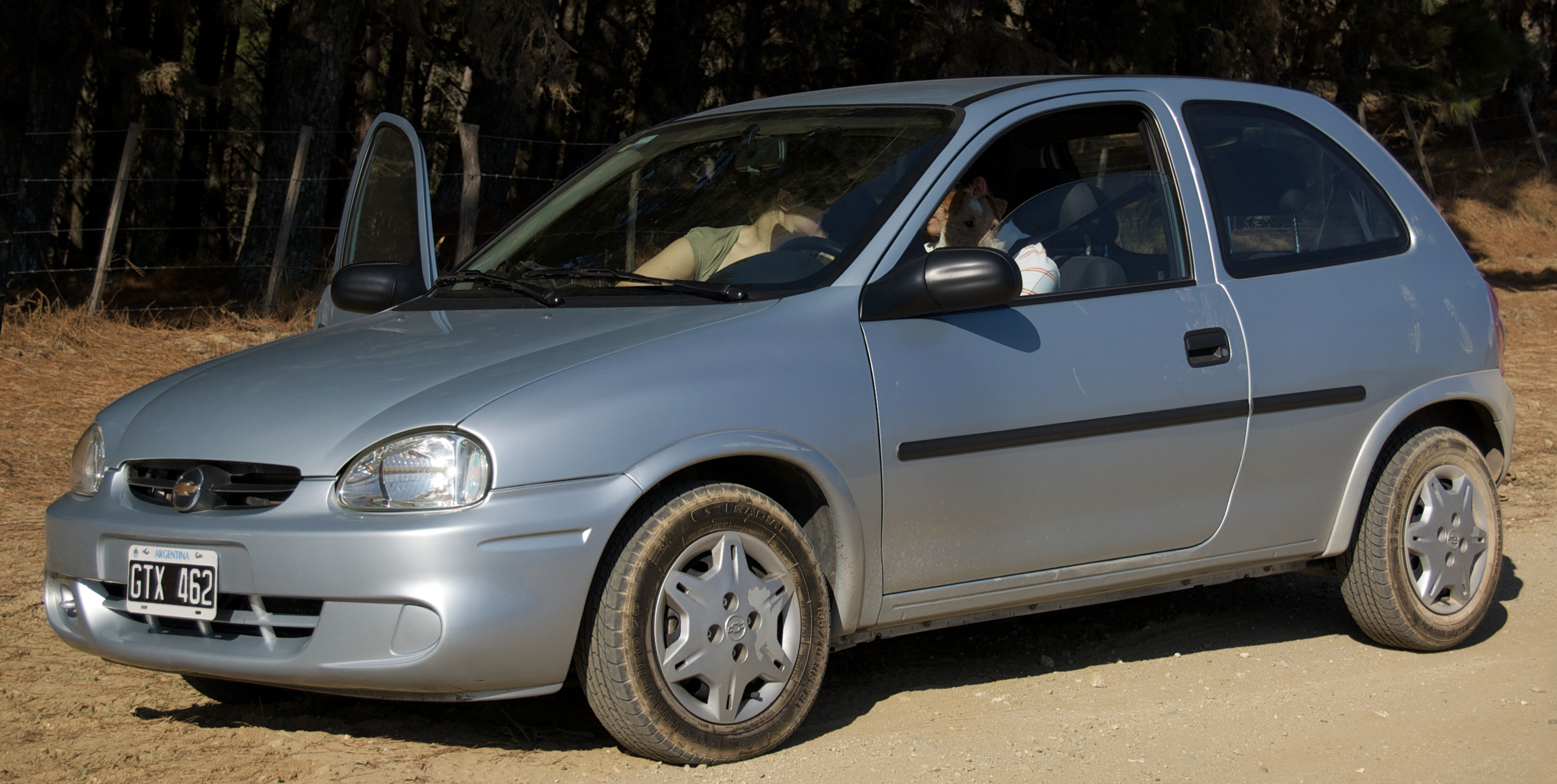
Chevrolet Corsa

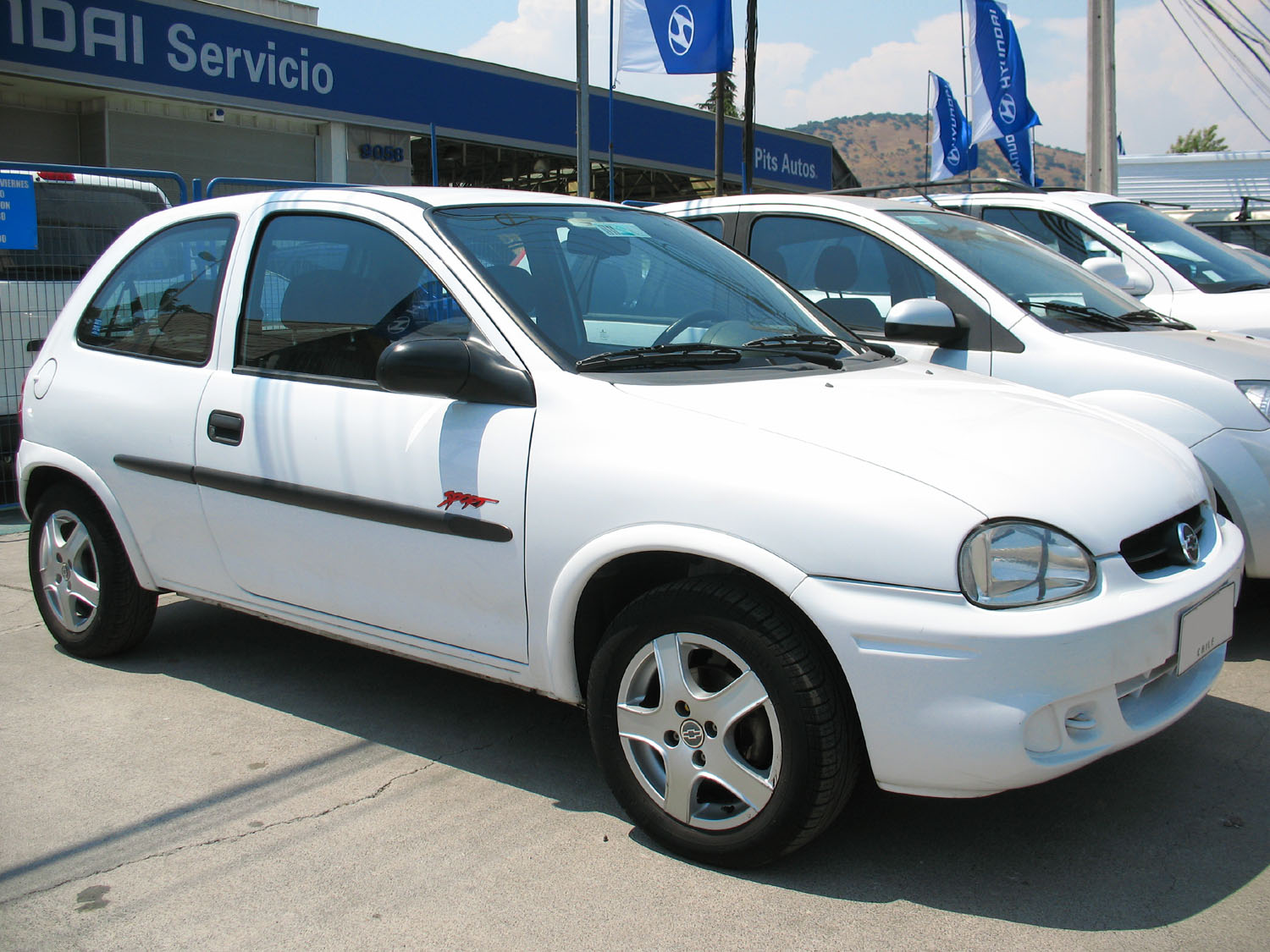
Chevrolet Chevy

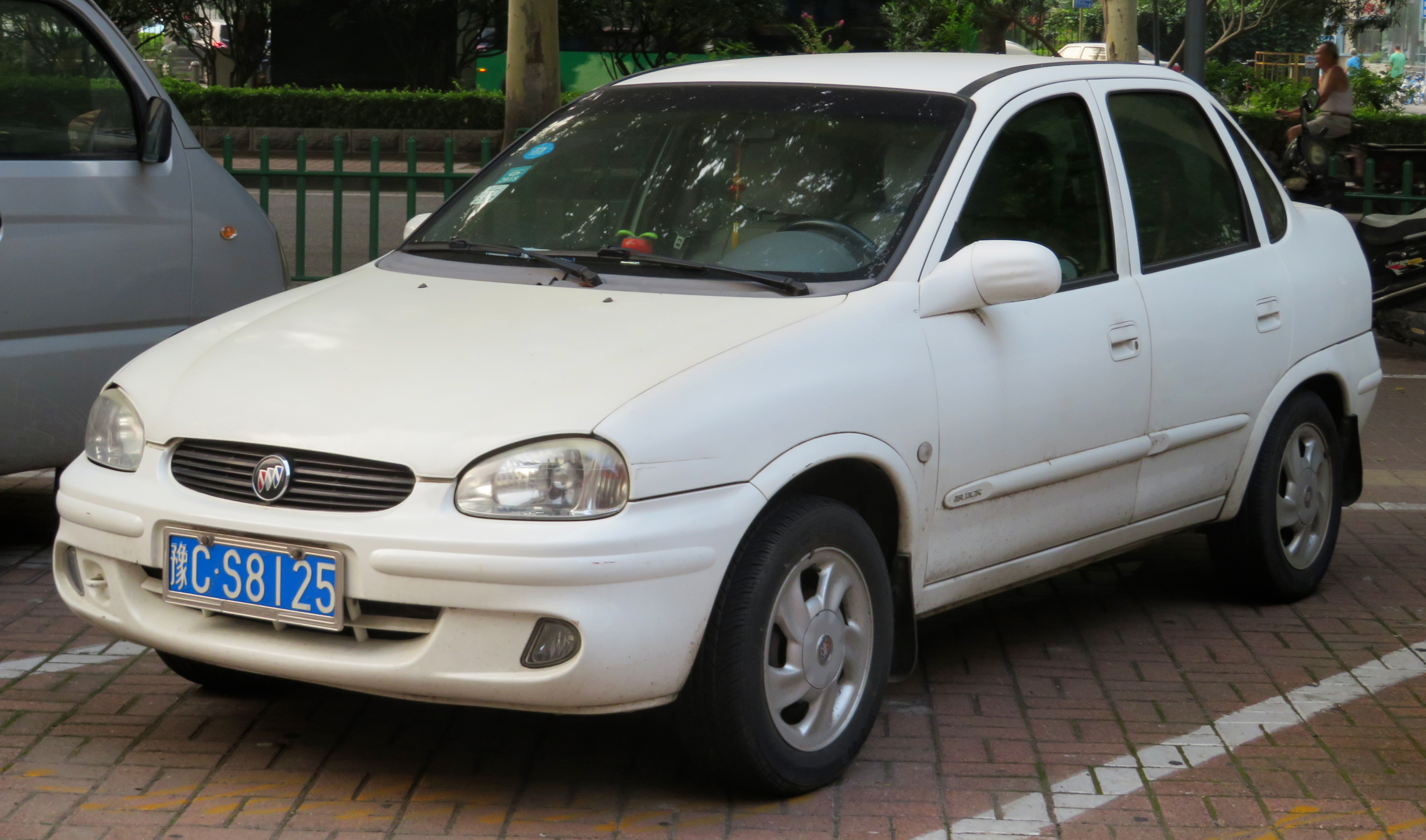
Buick Sail

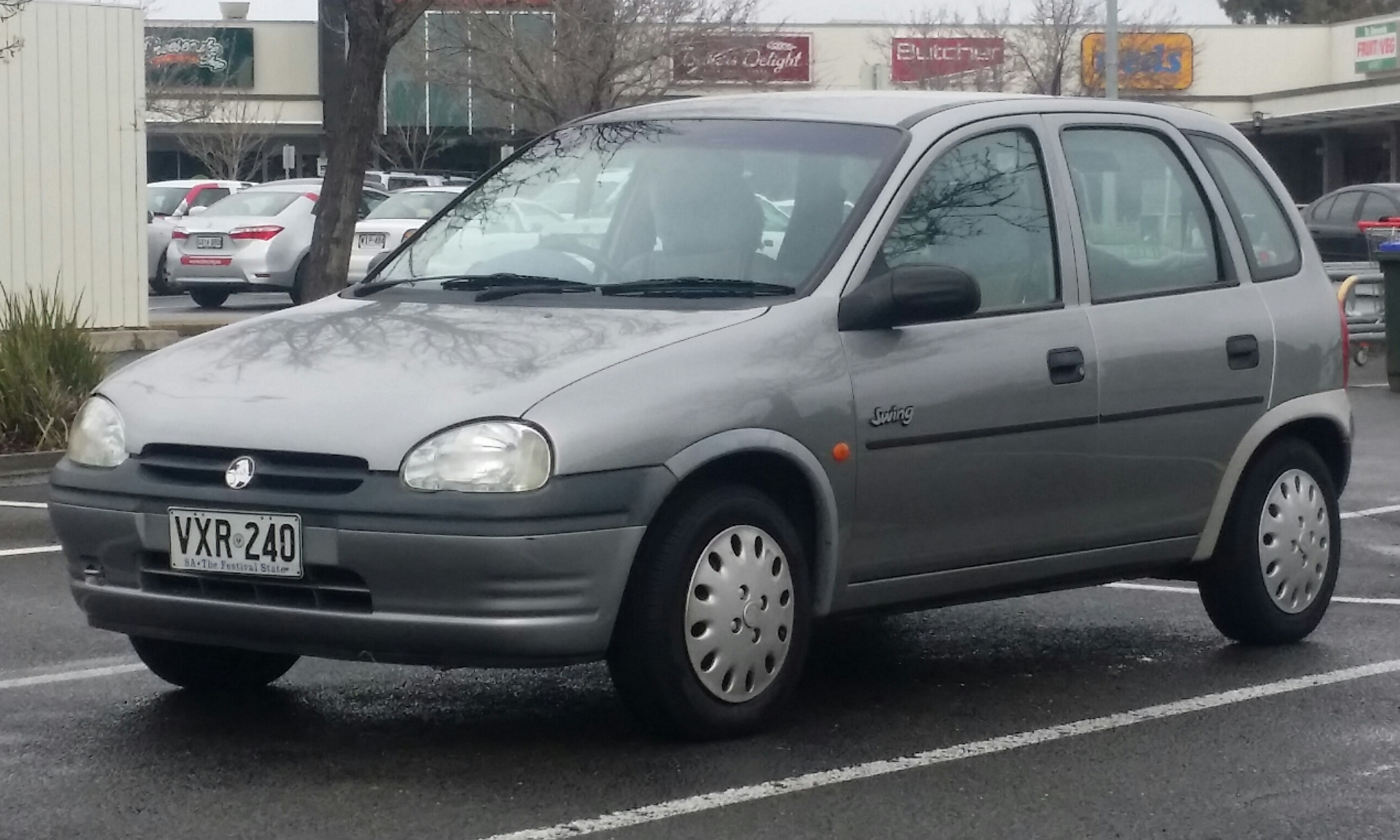
Holden Barina

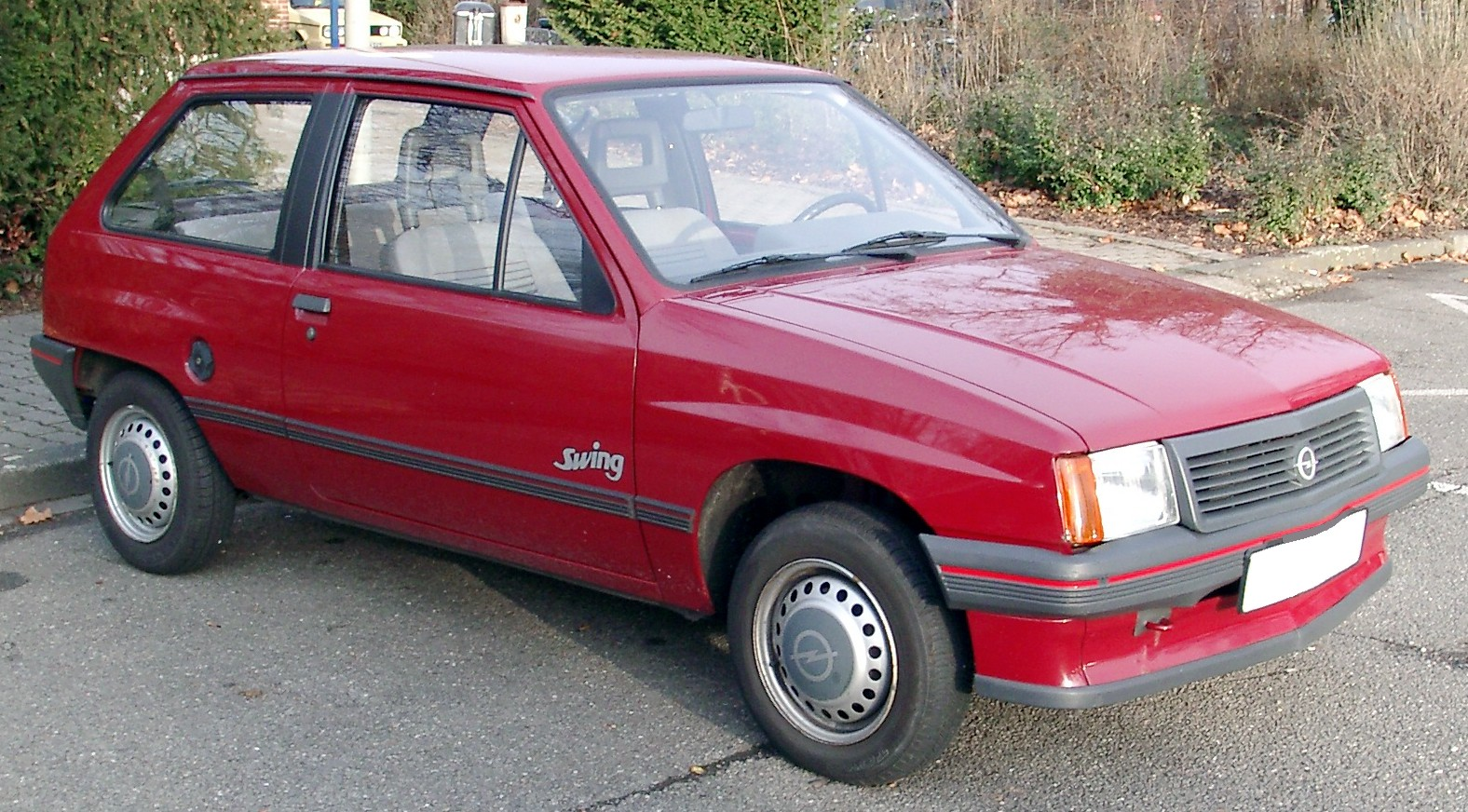
Opel Corsa A

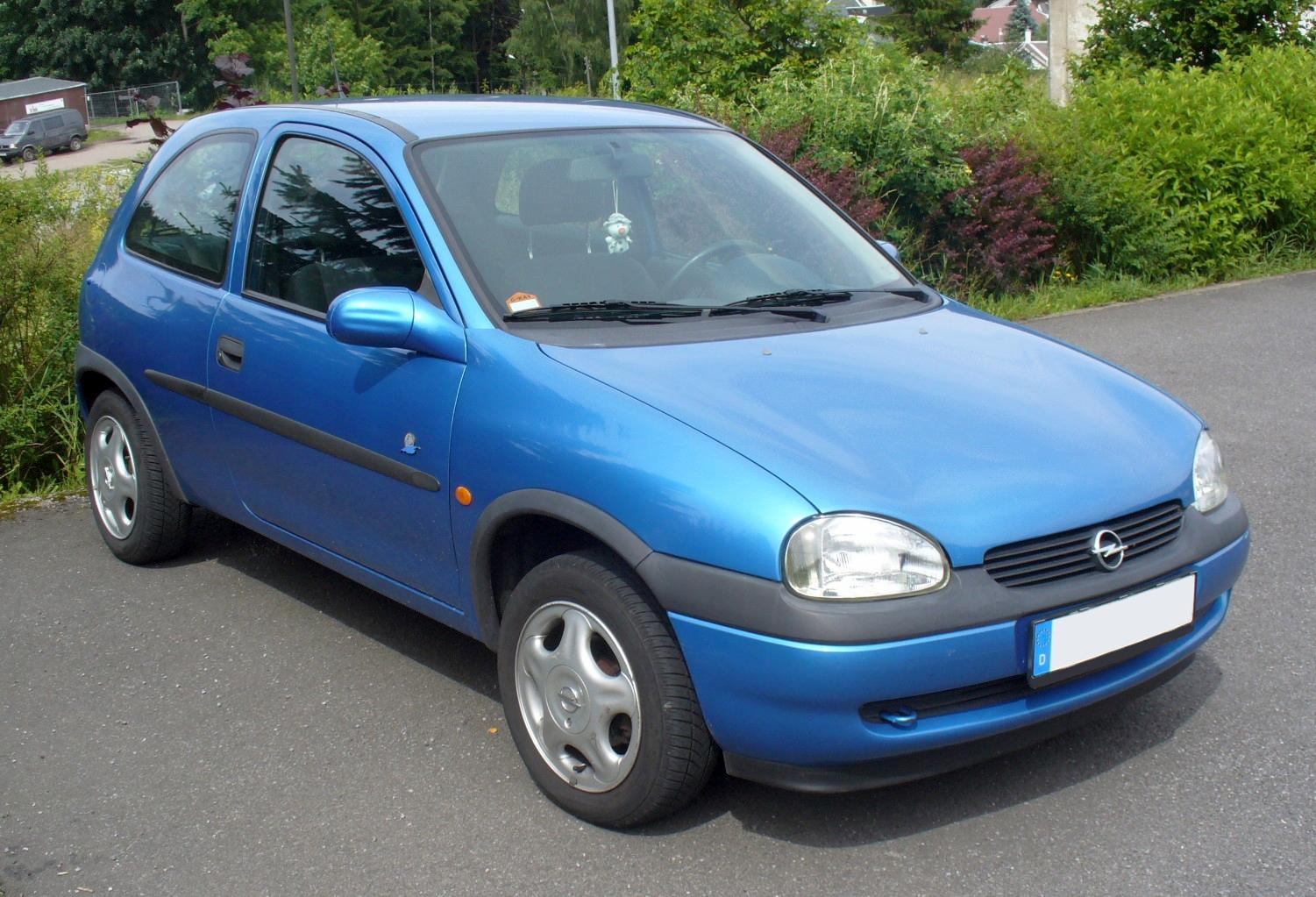
Opel Corsa B

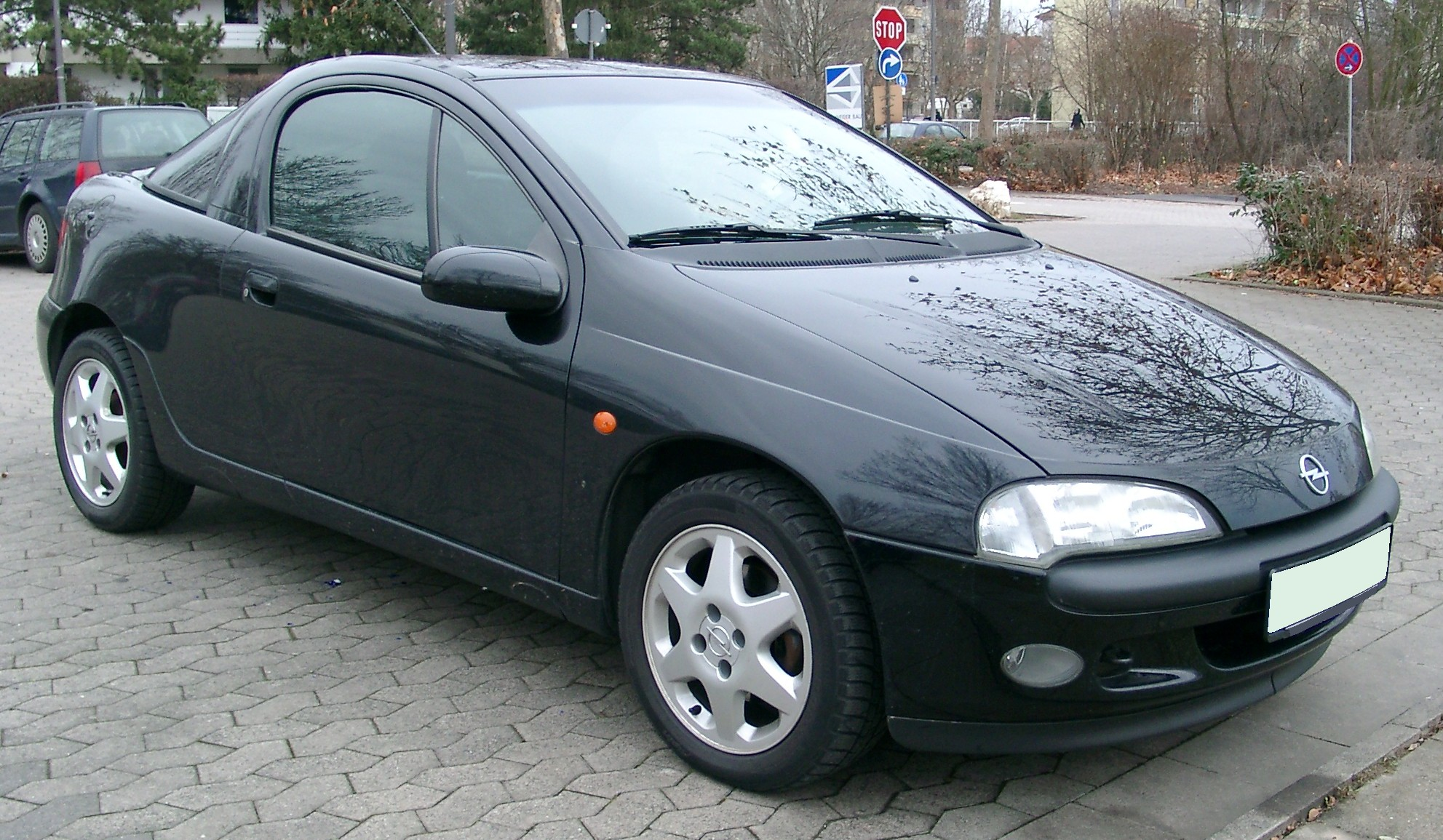
Opel Tigra A

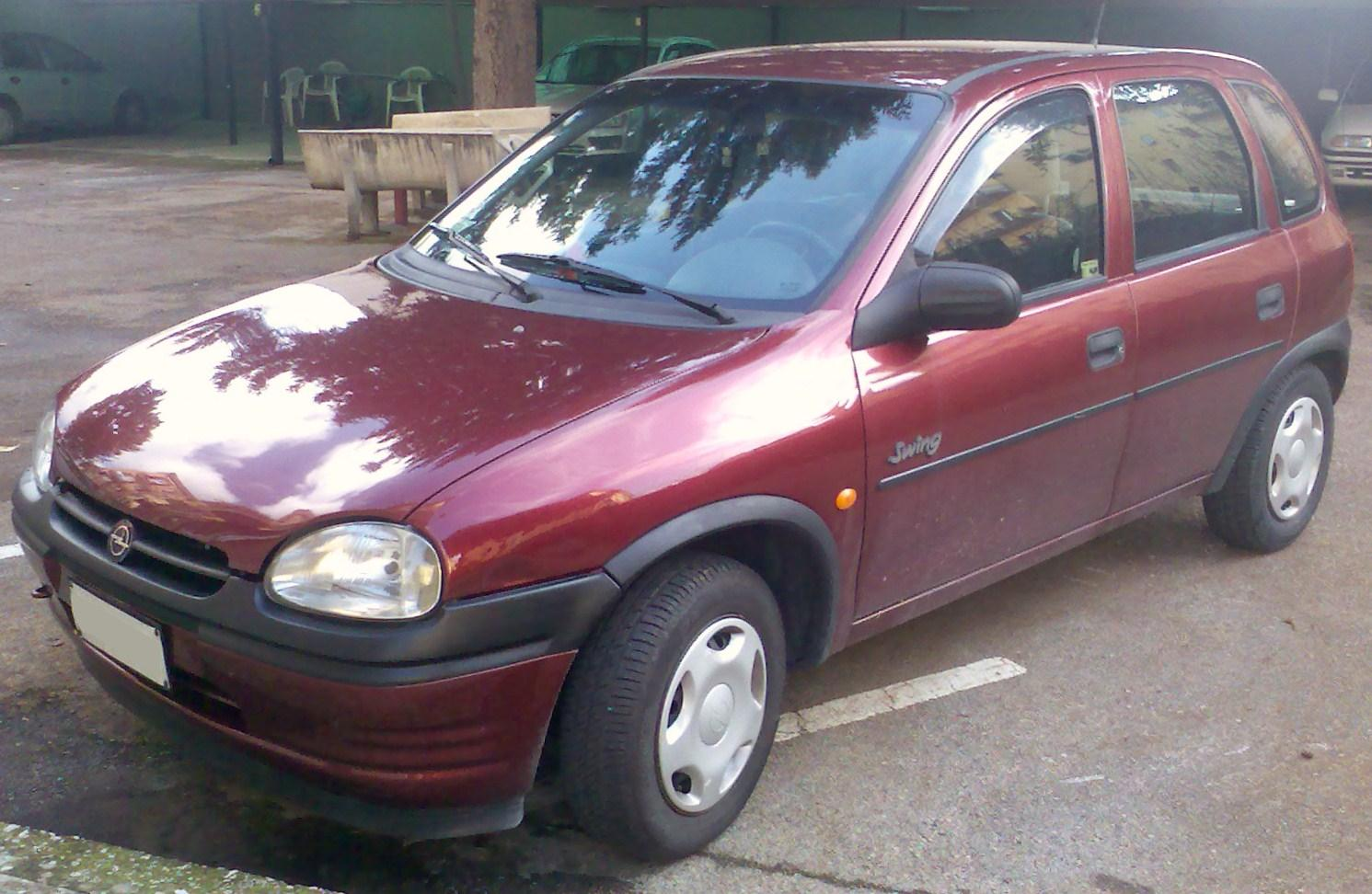
Opel Vita

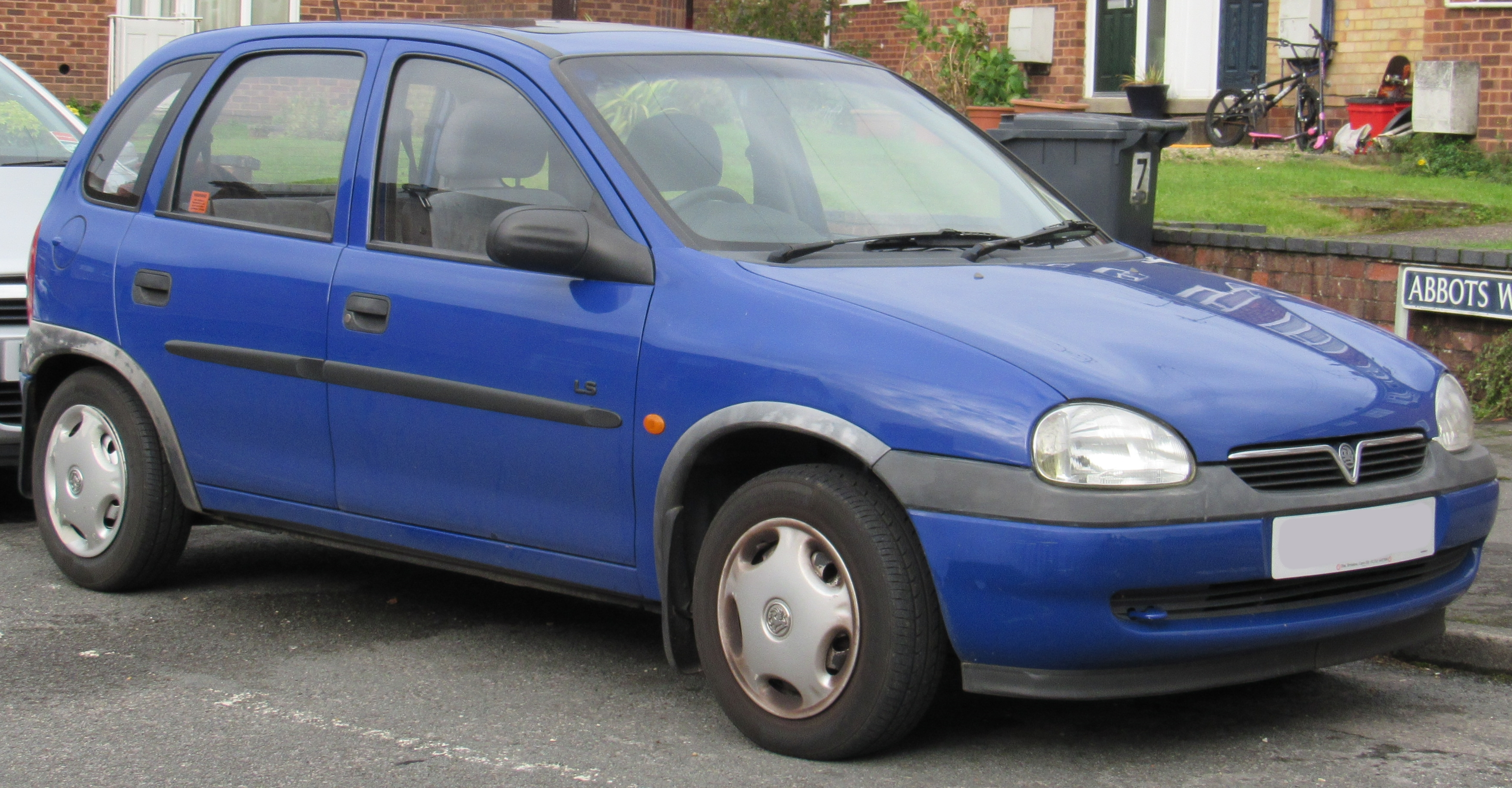
Vauxhall Corsa

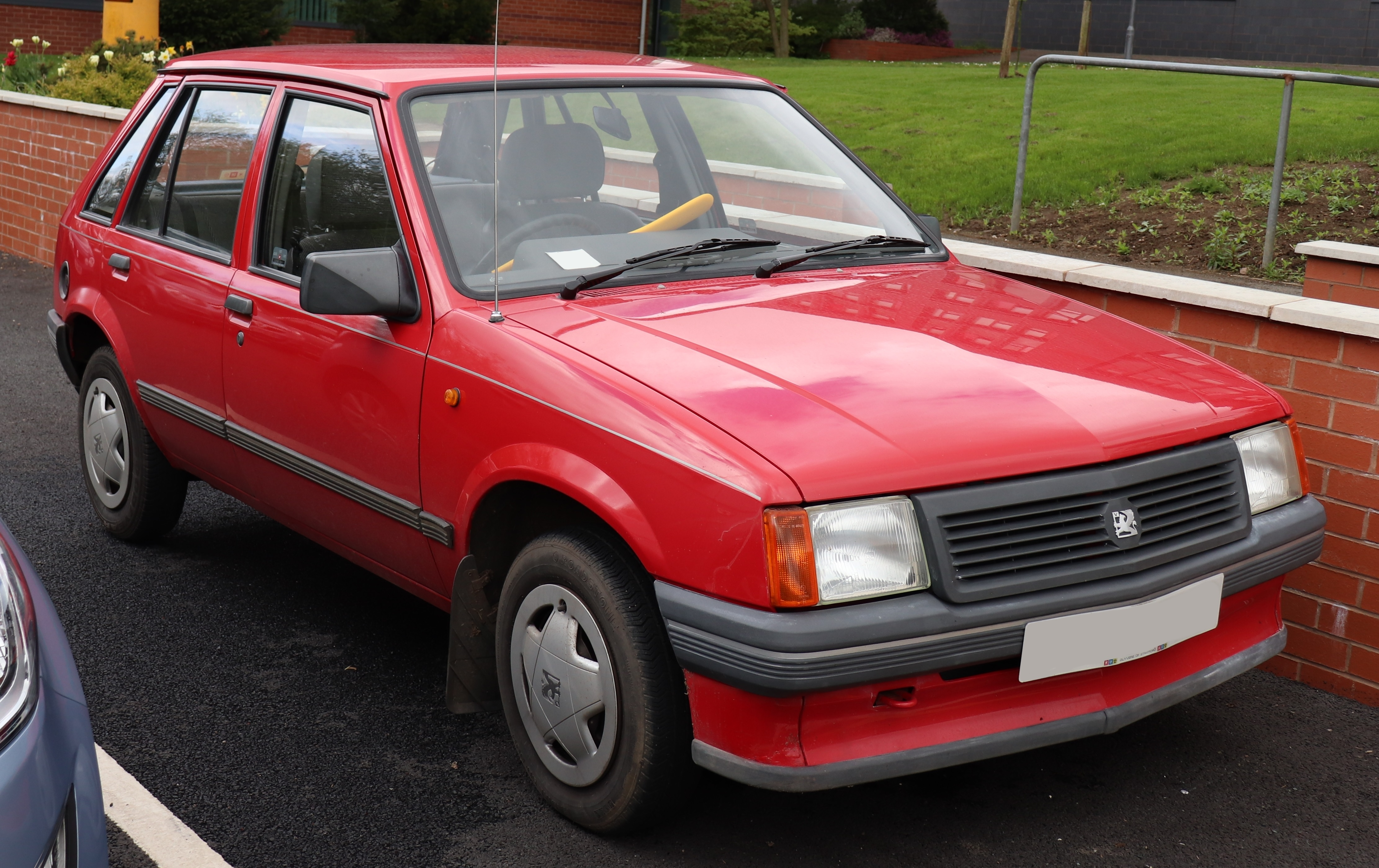
Vauxhall Nova

== See also ==
- List of General Motors platforms
