= Chevrolet Celta =

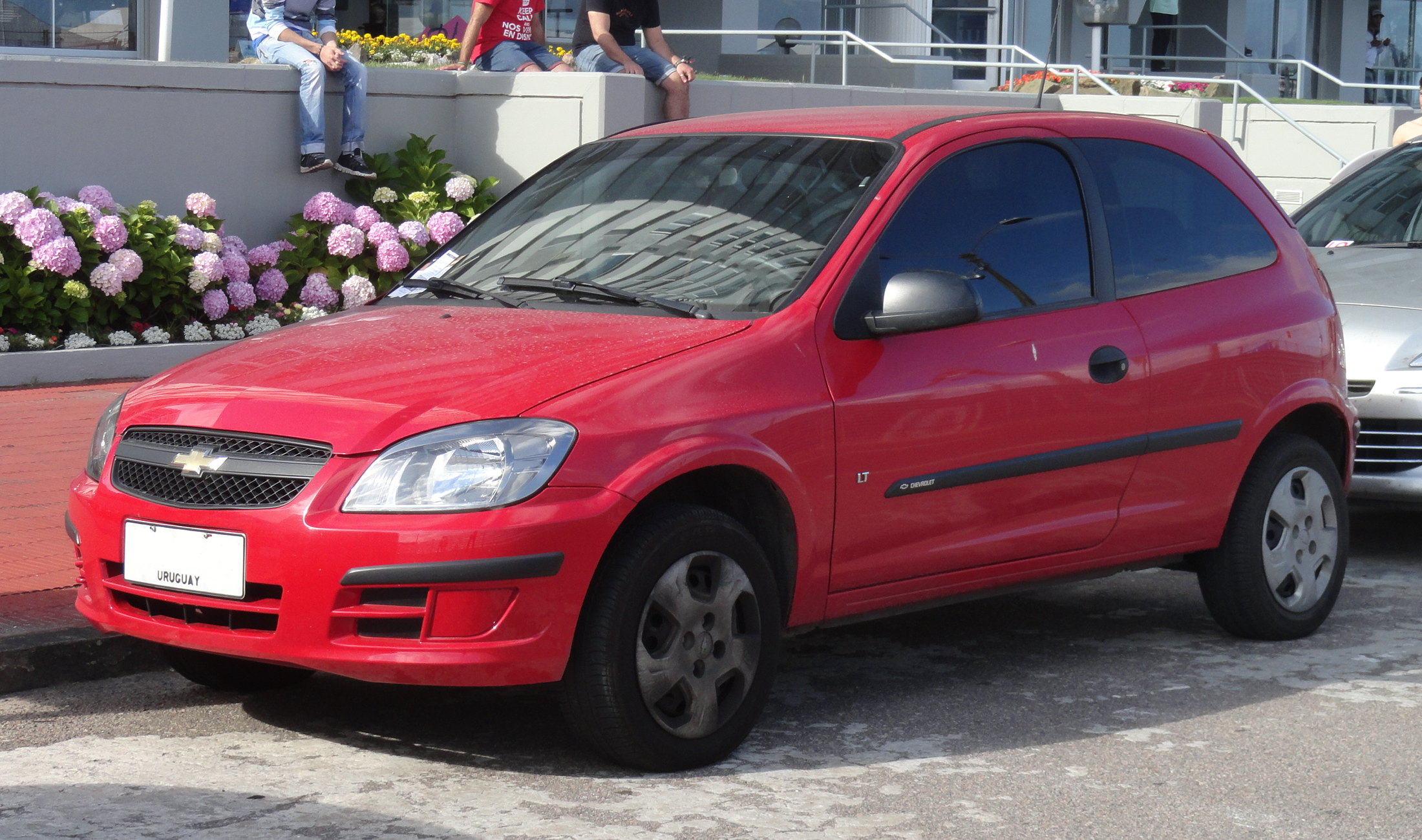

Overview
- Manufacturer: Chevrolet (General Motors)
- Also called: Chevrolet Prisma (sedan); Suzuki Fun (Argentina)
- Production: 2000–2015 (Celta); 2006–2012 (Prisma)
- Assembly: Gravataí, Brazil (GM Brazil)

Body and chassis
- Class: Supermini (B)/Economy car
- Body style: 3-door hatchback (Celta); 5-door hatchback (Celta); 4-door sedan (Prisma)
- Layout: Transverse Front-engine, front-wheel-drive
- Platform: GM4200 platform
- Related: Chevrolet Corsa B Chevrolet Chevy C2; Chevrolet Agile; Chevrolet Montana

Powertrain
- Engine: 1.0 L VHC I4 (gasoline); 1.0 L VHC-E I4 (gasoline / ethanol); 1.4 L Econo.Flex I4 (gasoline / ethanol)

Dimensions
- Wheelbase: 2,445 mm (96.3 in)
- Length: 3,750 mm (147.6 in) (hatchback); 4,125 mm (162.4 in) (sedan)
- Width: 1,610 mm (63.4 in)
- Height: 1,430 mm (56.3 in)

Chronology
- Predecessor: Chevrolet Corsa B
- Successor: Chevrolet Onix; Chevrolet Prisma MkII

The Chevrolet Celta, also known as the Suzuki Fun, is a low cost supermini car produced by Chevrolet for the Latin American market between 2000 and 2015. A sedan version is marketed as the Chevrolet Prisma. 600,000 Celtas have been built in Gravataí, more than one hundred thousand per year.

== Evolution ==
=== 2000–2006 ===
It was released in 2000 in Brazil as a three-door hatchback with a 60 PS (44 kW) 1.0 L (61 cu in) gasoline engine, based on the Opel Corsa B and with design features similar to those of the Chevrolet (Opel) Vectra B. In 2002, a five-door version was made available, and the engine power was increased to 70 metric horsepower (51 kW) at 6,400 rpm, the same VHC (Very High Compression) technology used in the Latin American Corsa C. A 85 PS (63 kW) 1.4 L (0.31 imp gal; 0.37 US gal) gasoline engine was added in 2003.

An "Off-Road" accessories kit was for sale for both old and new Celtas in 2005, and the 1.0 L was converted into a gasoline-ethanol flexible fuel engine (gasoline versions are still available, especially outside Brazil).

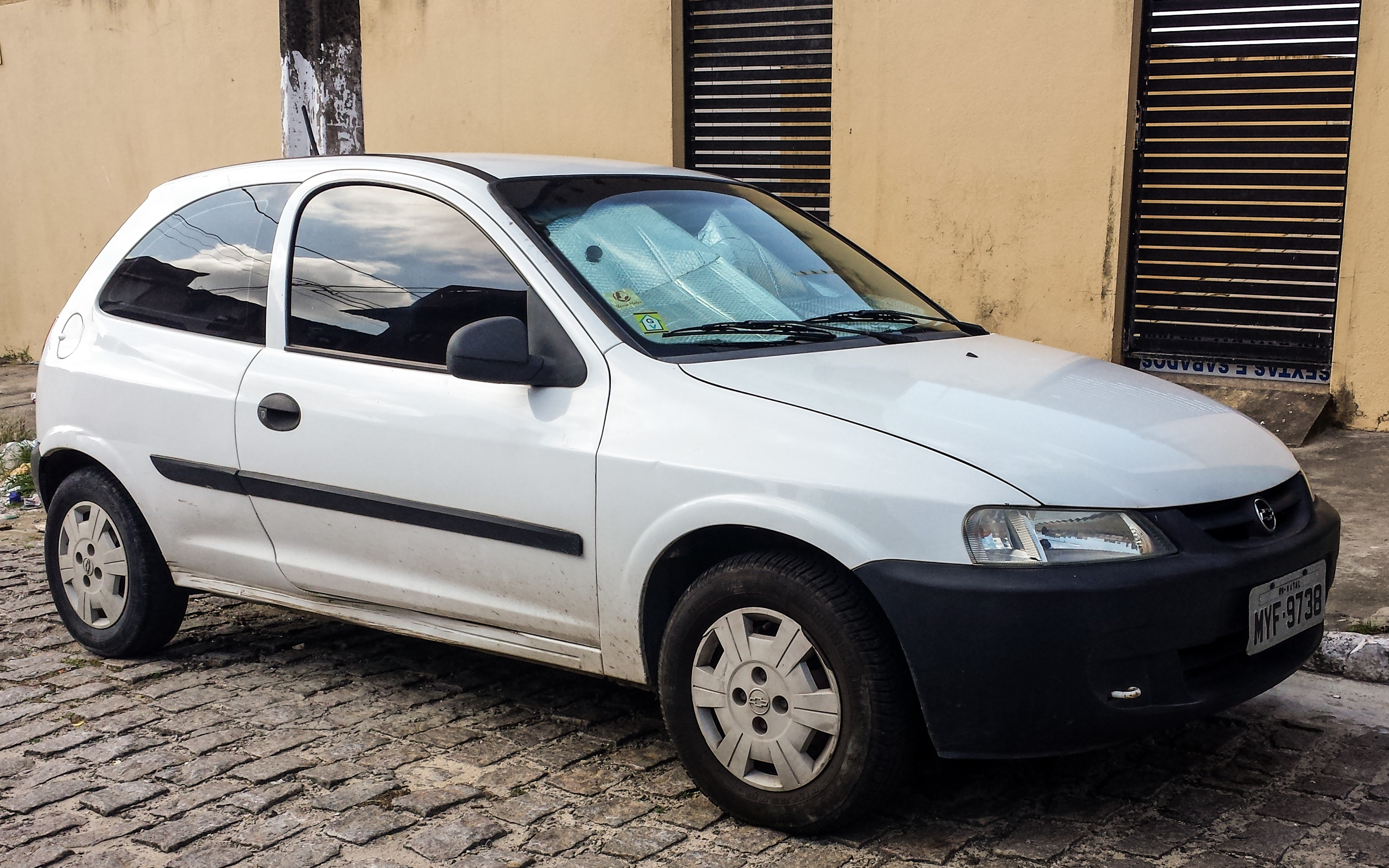
Pre-facelift Chevrolet Celta (2000–2006)

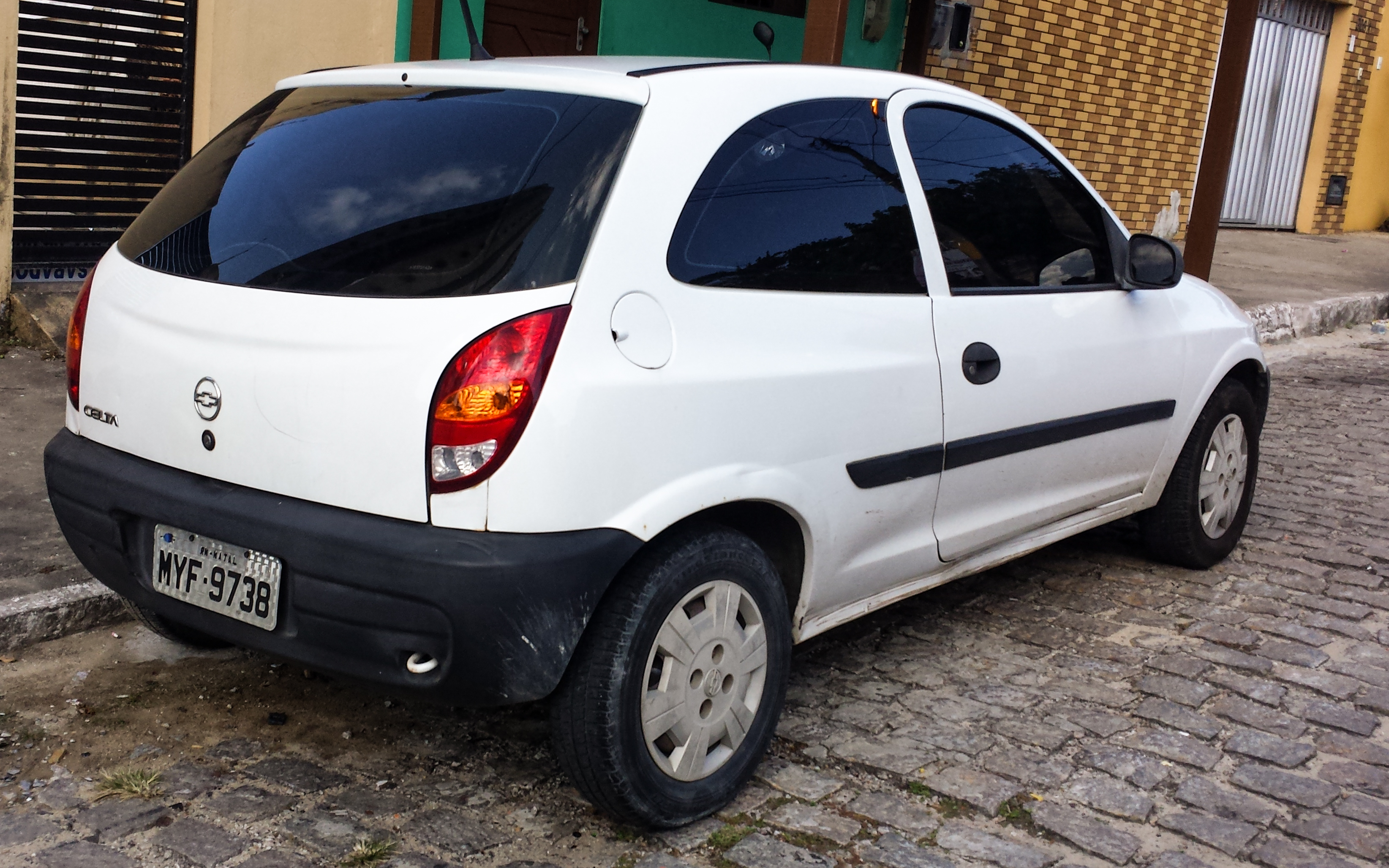
Pre-facelift Chevrolet Celta (Rear view)

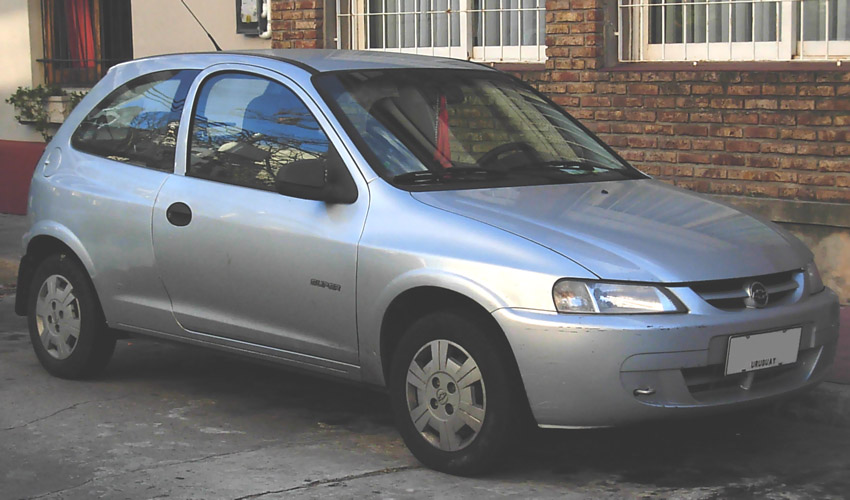
Chevrolet Celta (Super Trim level)

=== 2006–2011 ===
In 2006, the Celta underwent a facelift, which provided for a more modern look and an enhancement of build quality. The new front fascia makes it closer to new Chevrolet models, especially the new Brazilian made Chevrolet Vectra based on the Opel Astra [H] (different from the Chevrolet Vectra C model sold in other Latin countries such as Mexico and Chile).

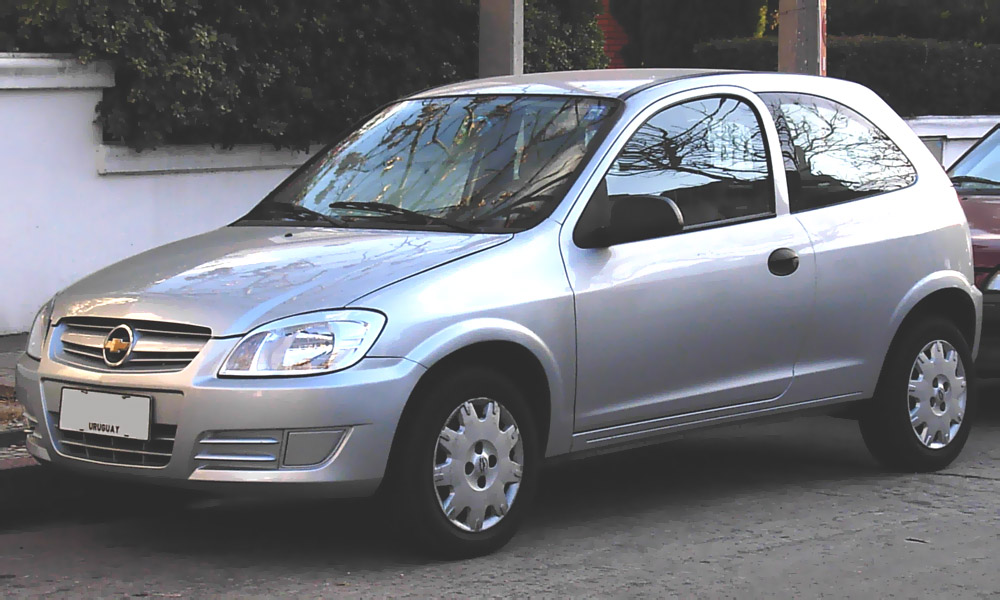
First facelift Chevrolet Celta (2006–2011)

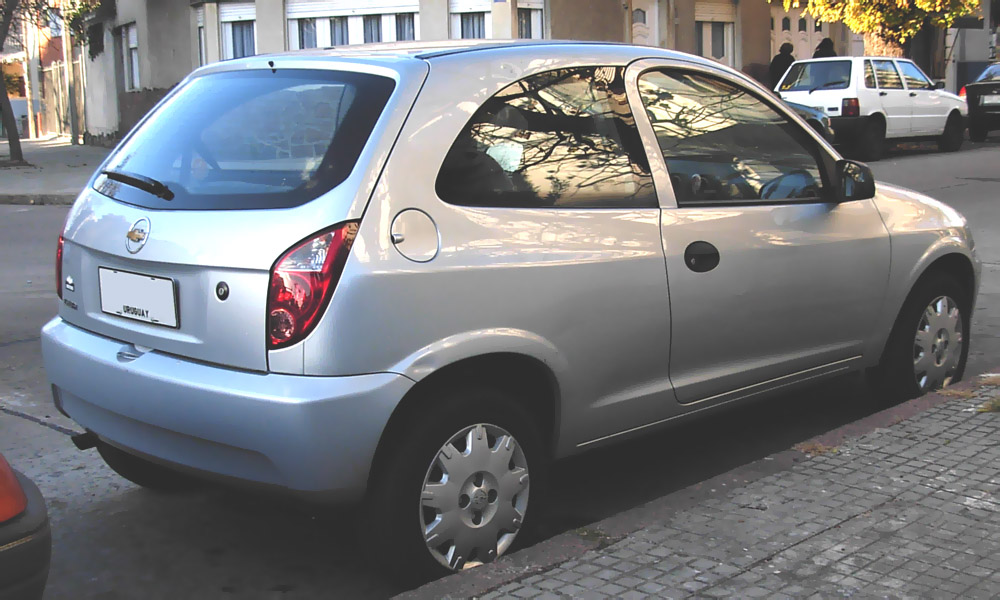
First facelift Chevrolet Celta (rear)

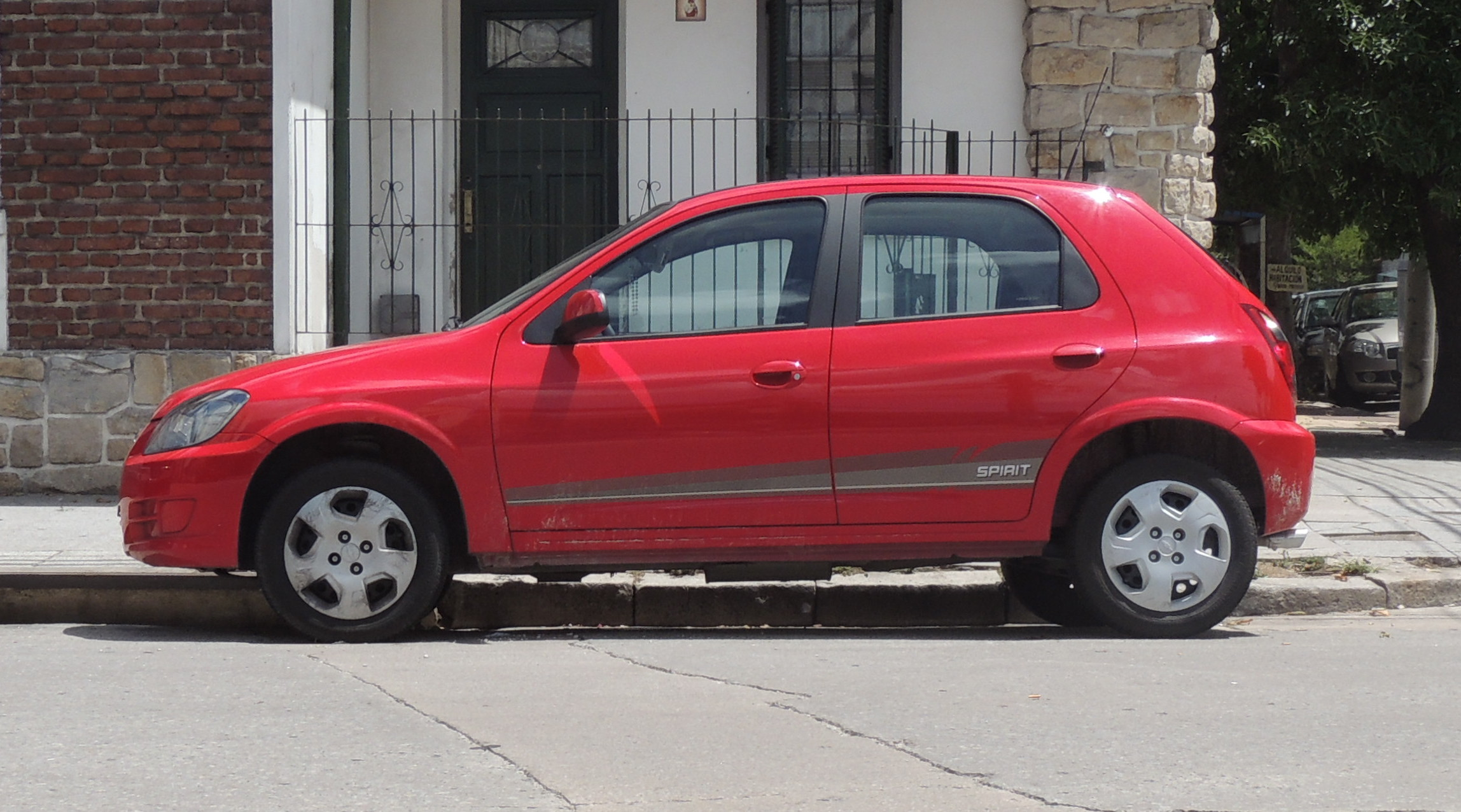
First facelift Chevrolet Celta (5 doors)

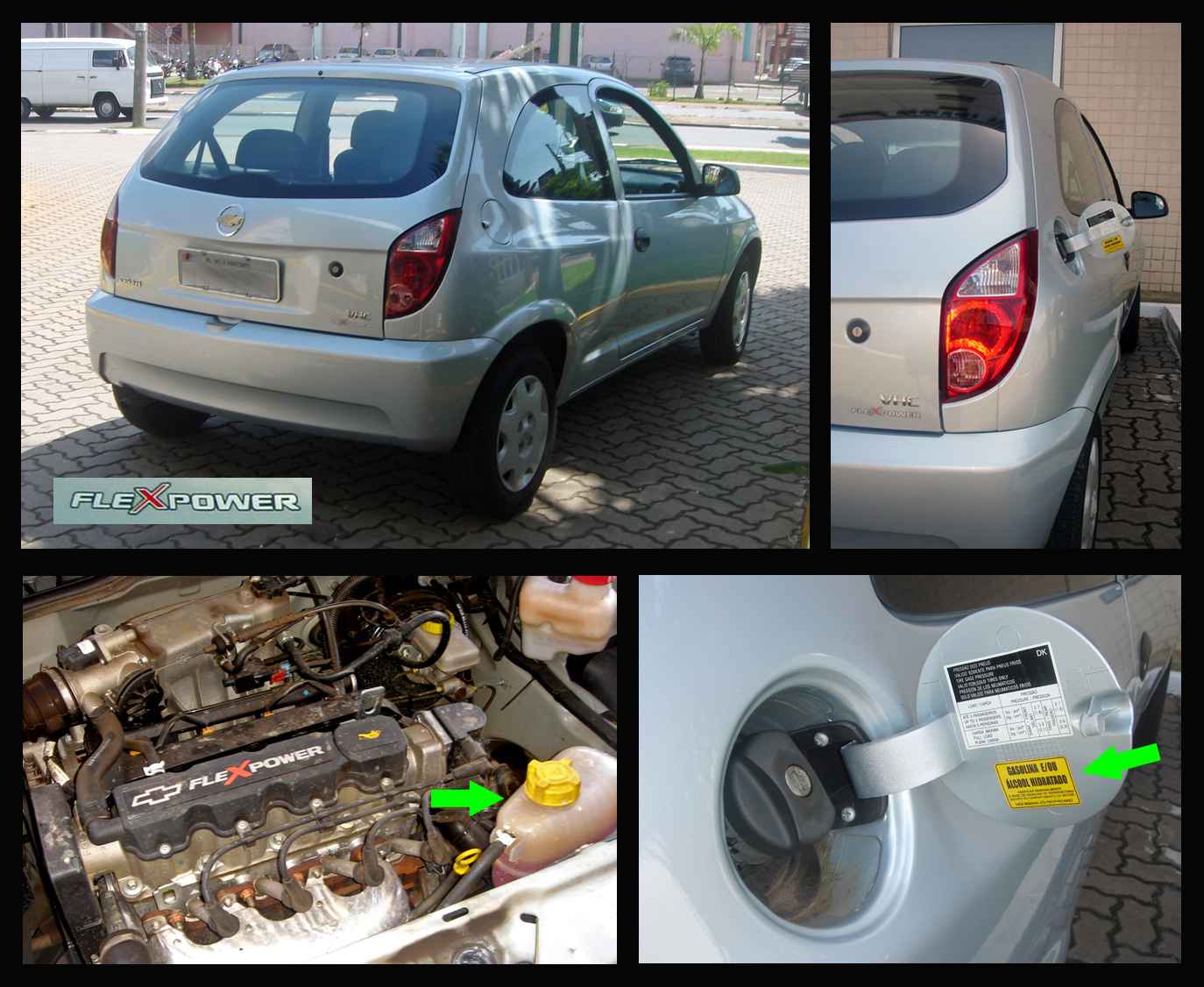
Details of the flex fuel version of the Chevrolet Celta

=== 2011–2015 ===
A second and final facelift was applied to the Celta in 2011.

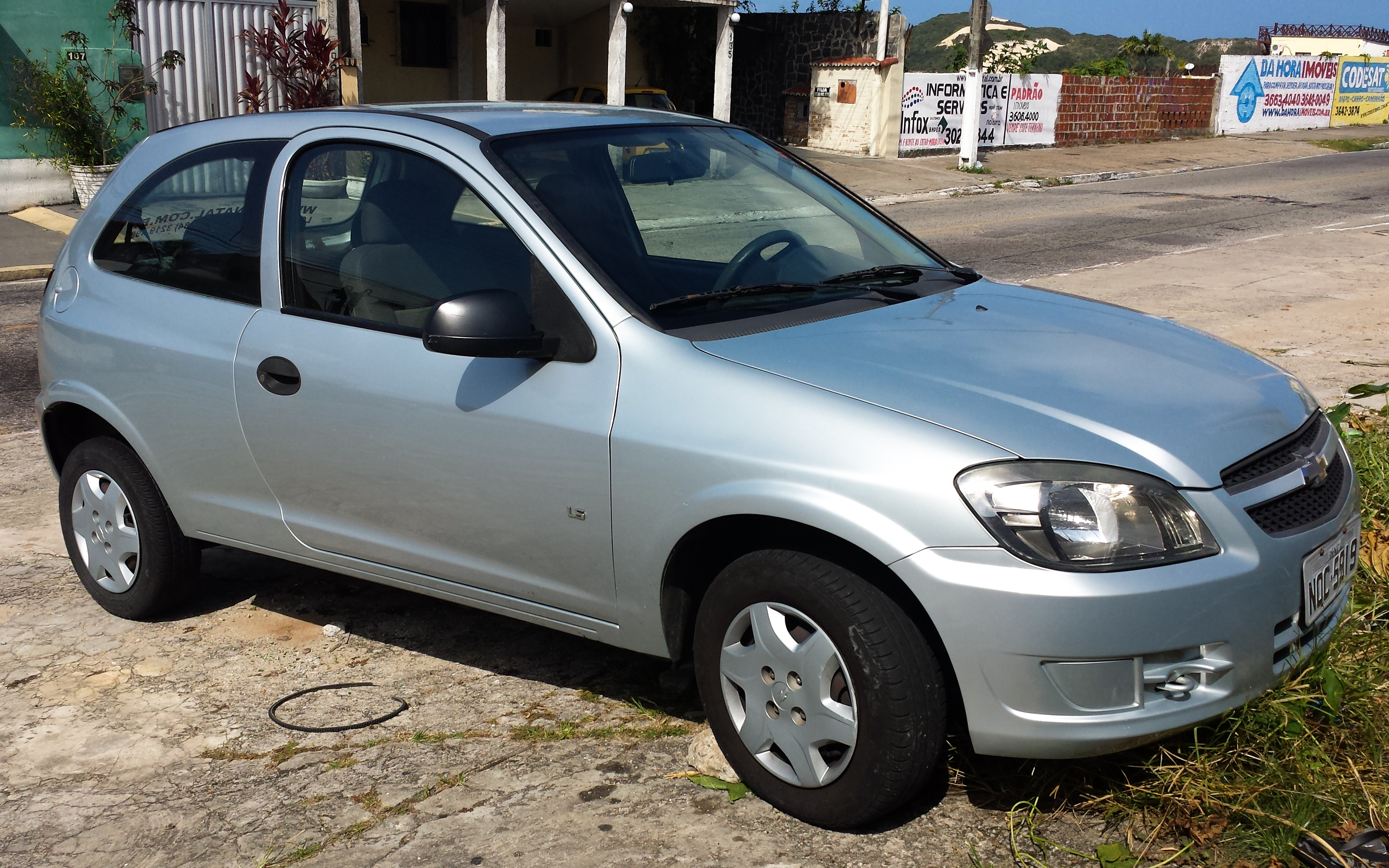
Second facelift Chevrolet Celta (2011–2015)

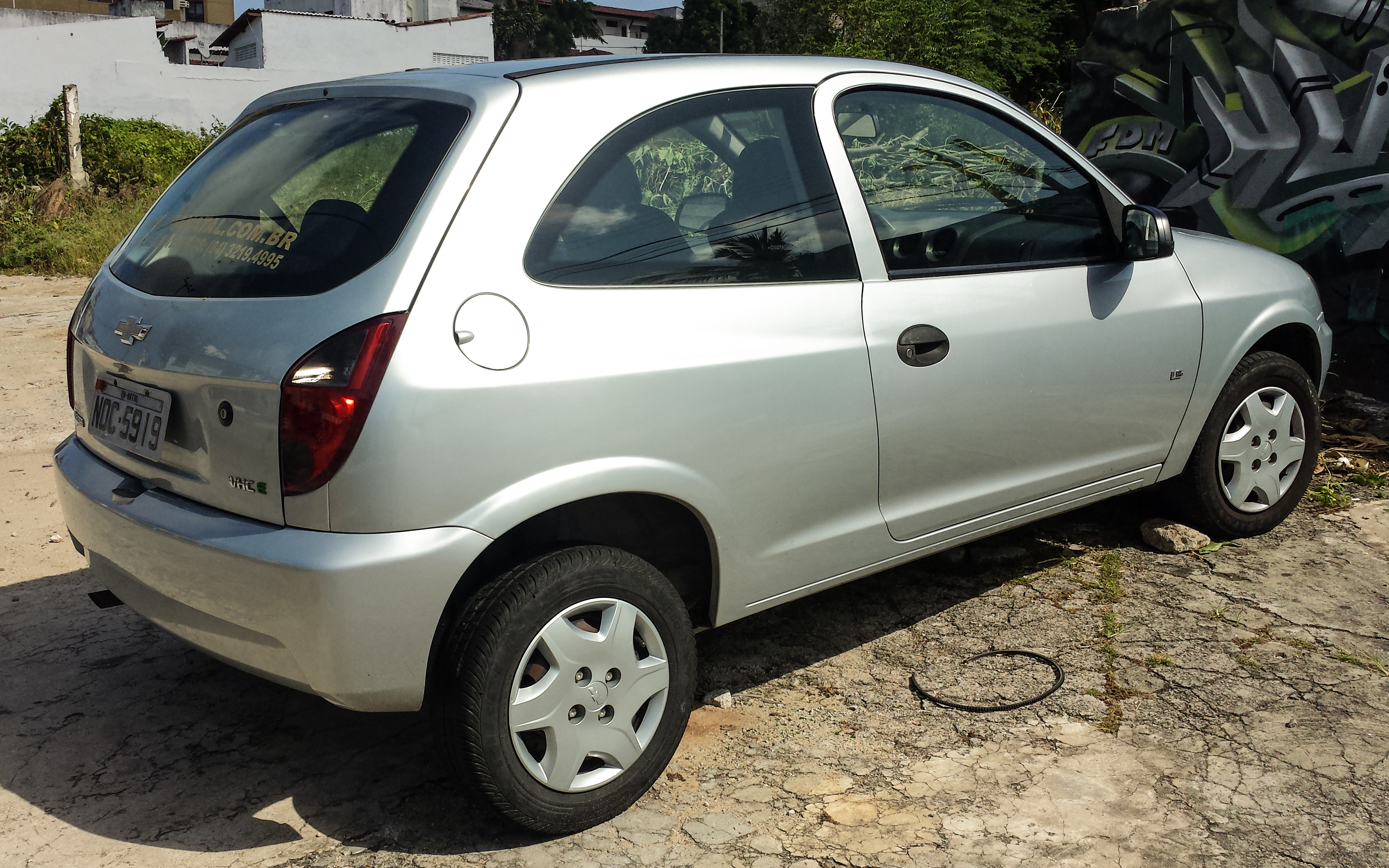
Second facelift Chevrolet Celta (rear)

== Related models ==
=== Chevrolet Prisma ===
A sedan version of the Celta, named Chevrolet Prisma, was released in early 2007. It was not meant to replace Classic (a low cost sedan version of the Corsa B) neither the Corsa Sedan (C), but to fill a market gap between them instead. The only available engine option is a 1.4 L Econo.Flex gasoline/ethanol flexible fuel engine. Its high compression rate gives as a result a maximum output of 97 PS when running on ethanol and 95 hp when running on gasoline.

Early 2009 marked the release of the Prisma 1.0-litre and the new VHC-E engine (77 hp or 57 kW gasoline and 78 hp or 58 kW ethanol) for Prisma and Celta. By early 2012, 1.5 million Celtas had been built in Gravataí.

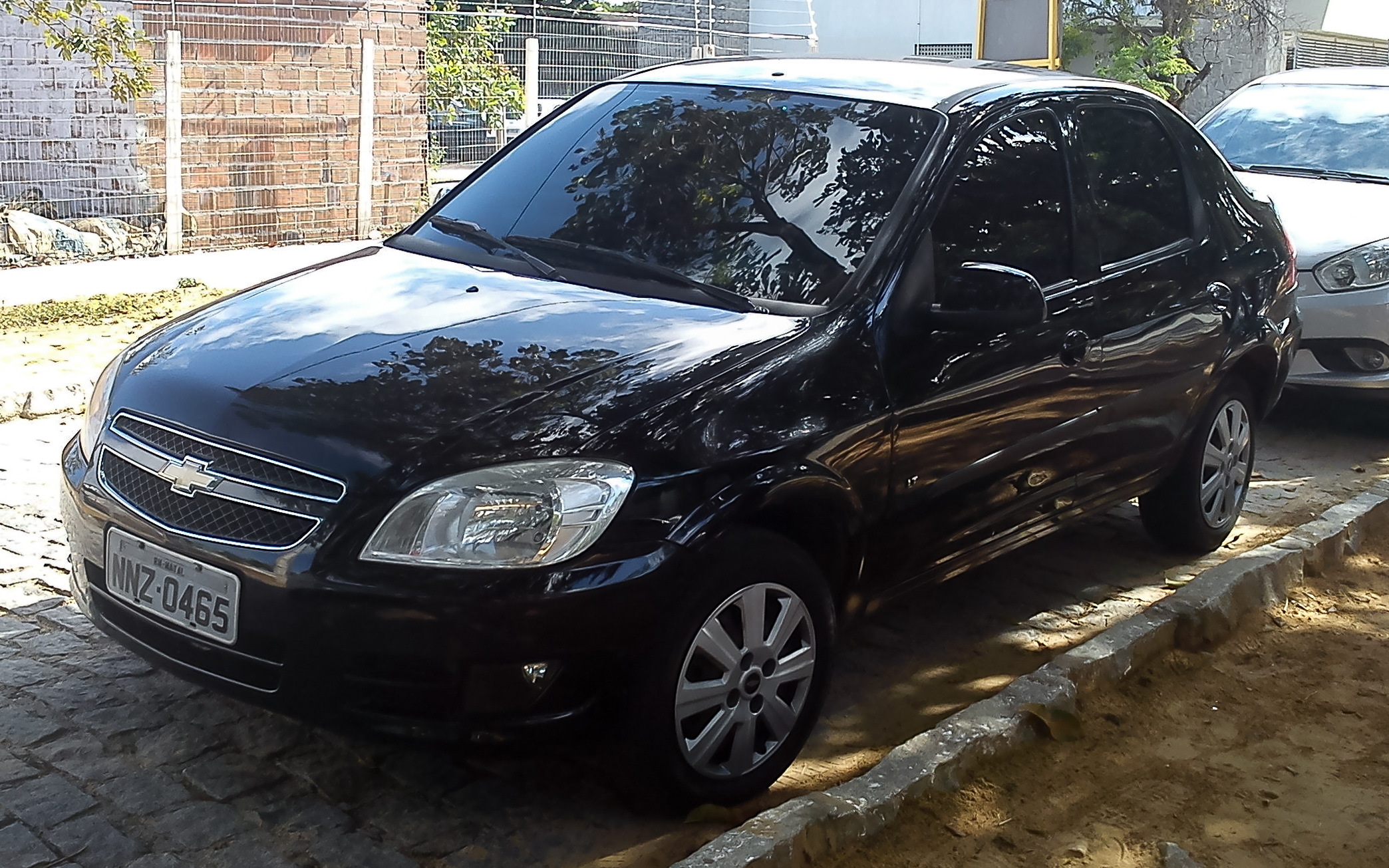
Chevrolet Prisma (first generation)

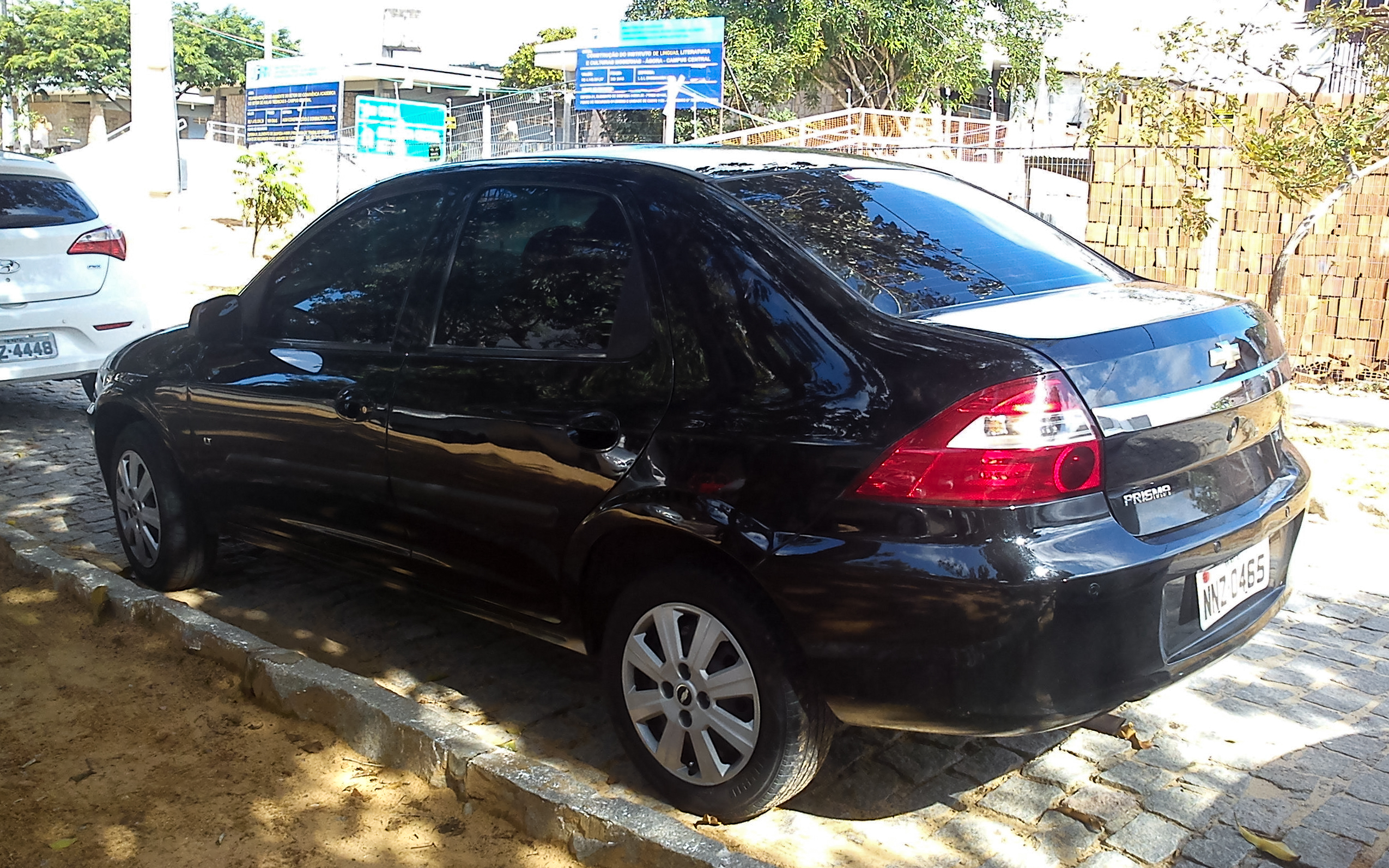
Chevrolet Prisma (rear)

=== Suzuki Fun ===
The Japanese automaker Suzuki sold a rebadge variant of the Celta called Suzuki Fun in Argentina between 2004 and 2011. The Fun was only available as a 3- or 5-doors hatchback in LS and LT trim levels, and was replaced by the facelifted Celta in July 2011 after the Suzuki brand was entirely withdrawn from the country.

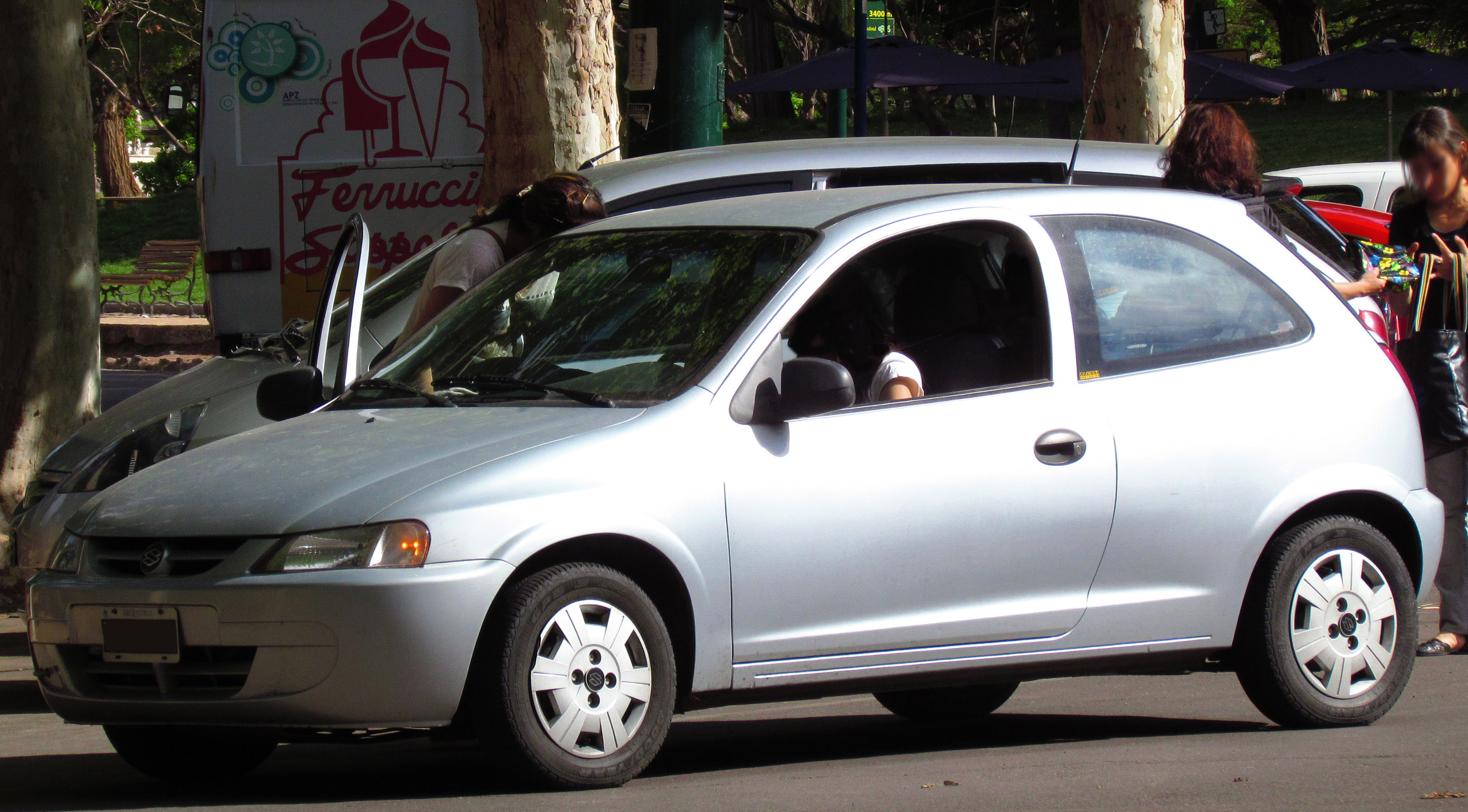
2006 Suzuki Fun (Argentina)

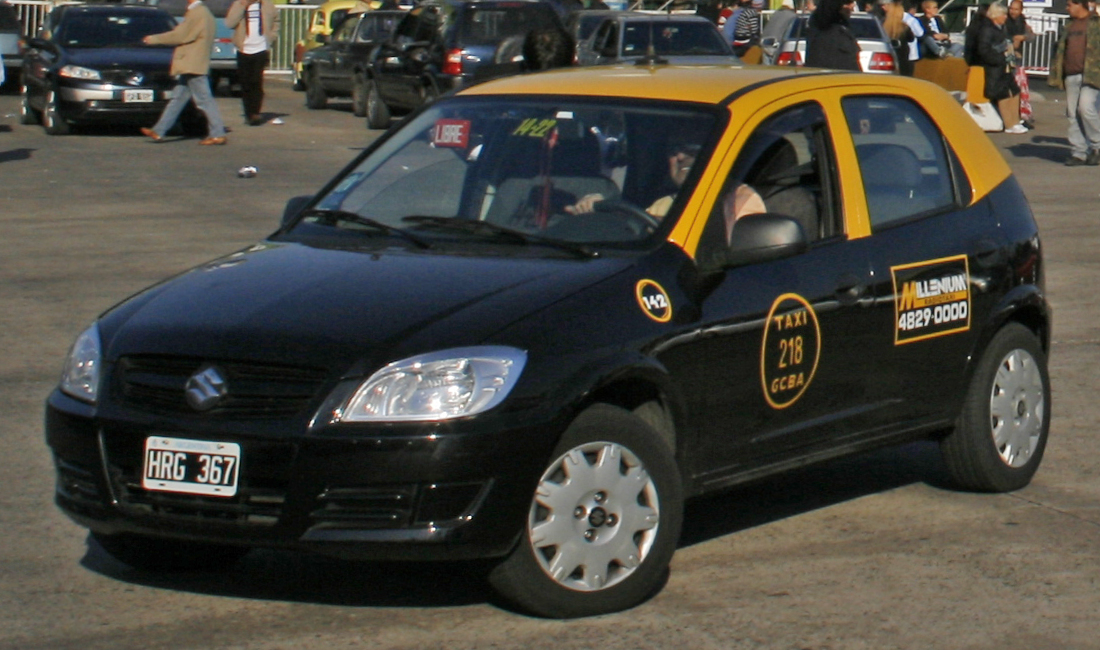
Suzuki Fun (facelift, Argentina)

== Sales ==
| Year | Brazil |
|---|---|
| 2006 | 9,108 |
| 2007 | 54,603 |
| 2008 | 50,699 |
| 2009 | 62,462 |
| 2010 | 63,075 |
| 2011 | 51,054 |
| 2012 | 34,938 |

== Technical details ==
The 1.0 L gasoline engine has a high power to displacement ratio (51 kW/L, 70 PS/L or 1.1 hp/cu in). However, this power is only available at 6400 rpm, and the maximum torque is 8.6 kgf·m (88 N·m) at 3000 rpm. Today, the Celta is sold only with the 1.0 FlexPower (the 1.4 MPFI stopping production in 2007). In 2002 GM changed the 1.0 MPFI (60 PS or 44 kW) engine to a 1.0 VHC (70 PS or 51 kW), in 2005 to VHC FlexPower (70 PS with Petrol or alcohol), and in 2009 to VHCE FlexPower (77 PS with Petrol and 78 PS with alcohol). The total weight is approximately 850 kg (1,872 lb). In Uruguay, Celta 1.4 MPFI are available since 2009 as the 'new' Celta with the new front lights and all facelift add-ons. This model continues on sell in 2012 and manufacturing dates of the units are from 2011 (1.4 MPFI engines didn't stop production in 2007).

== Safety ==
The Chevrolet Celta in its most basic Latin American market configuration with no airbags has been rated as highly unsafe by Latin NCAP in 2011, scoring only one star for adult occupants and two stars for children. Important to mention that when Celta was developed (2000) there was no Latin NCAP protocol available and that all regulatory safety items were met for the countries were Celta was sold.

Latin NCAP 1.0 test results Chevrolet Celta - NO Airbags (2011, based on Euro NCAP 1997)
| Test | Points | Stars |
|---|---|---|
| Adult occupant: | 3.82/17.0 | 1 /5 stars |
| Child occupant: | 22.68/49.00 | 2 /5 stars |

== Replacement ==
In 2012, General Motors announced the second generation Chevrolet Prisma, which would be based on the sedan version of the new Chevrolet Onix.

In 2015, the Celta was discontinued to increase production capacity of the Gravataí plant, and was replaced by the Onix/Prisma models, which enjoy very good sales in Brazil.

== Sales ==
| Year | Brazil |
|---|---|
| 2001 | 90,159 |
| 2002 | 105,440 |
| 2003 | 115,142 |
| 2004 | 122,691 |
| 2005 | 119,898 |
| 2006 | 126,198 |
| 2007 | 126,237 |
| 2008 | 130,425 |
| 2009 | 139,420 |
| 2010 | 155,093 |
| 2011 | 149,049 |
| 2012 | 137,624 |
| 2013 | 74,655 |
| 2014 | 42,654 |
| 2015 | 17,792 |
| 2016 | 8 |
| 2017 | 7 |
