= Chevrolet Prisma =

Chevrolet Prisma may refer to:

- The sedan version of the Chevrolet Celta, commonly called the Mk I.
- The sedan version of the Chevrolet Onix, commonly called the Mk II.
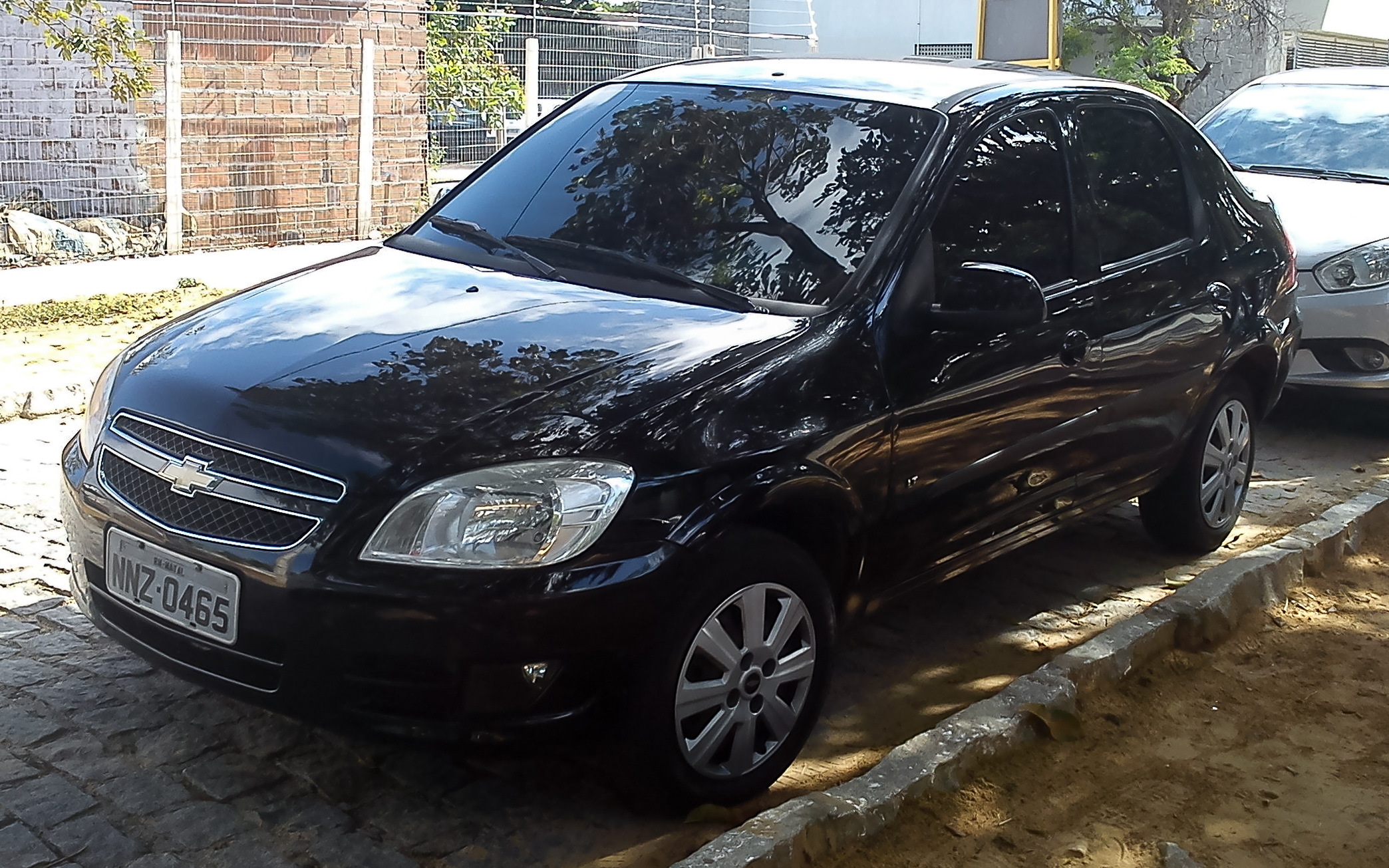
Chevrolet Prisma Mk I (2006-2012)

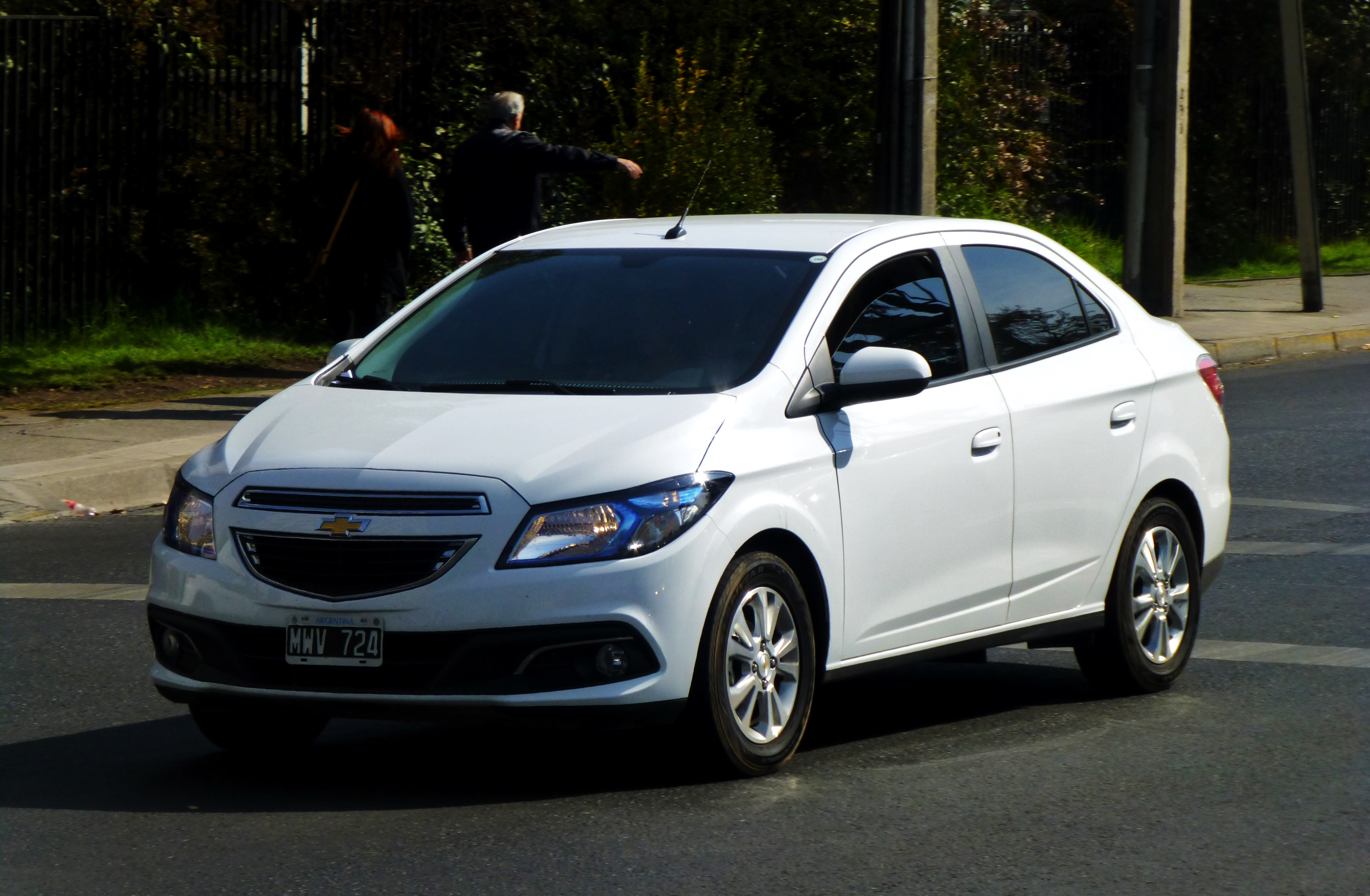
Chevrolet Prisma Mk II (2013-2019)
