= Chevrolet Classic =

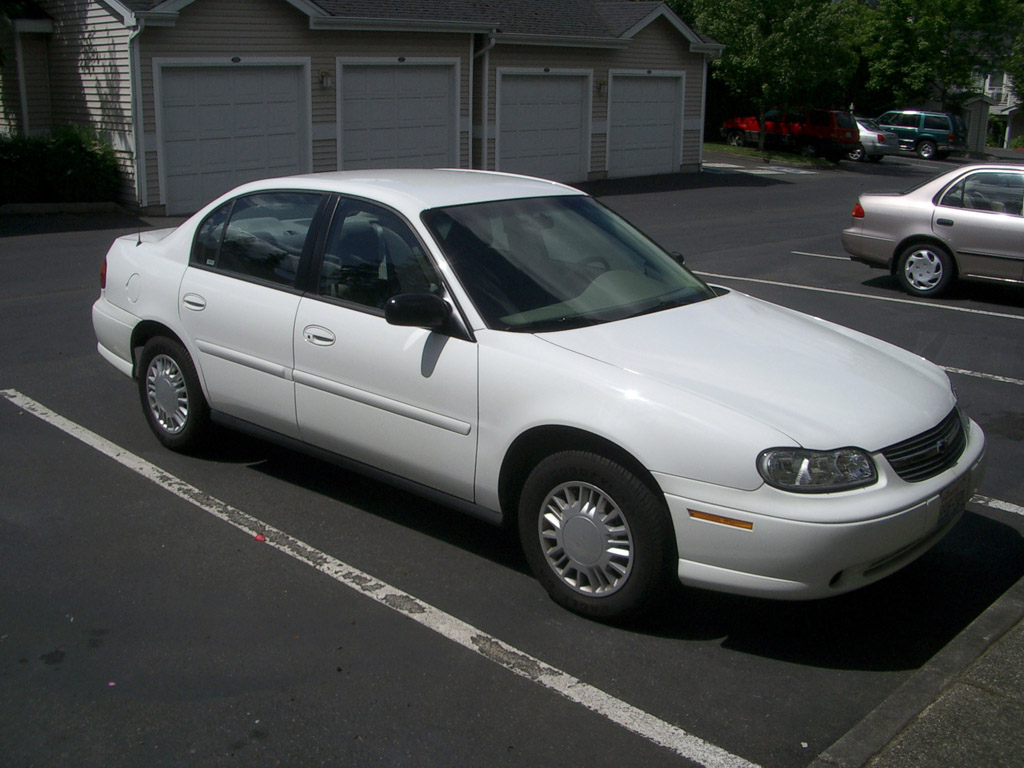
A Chevrolet Classic rental car based on the Chevrolet Malibu

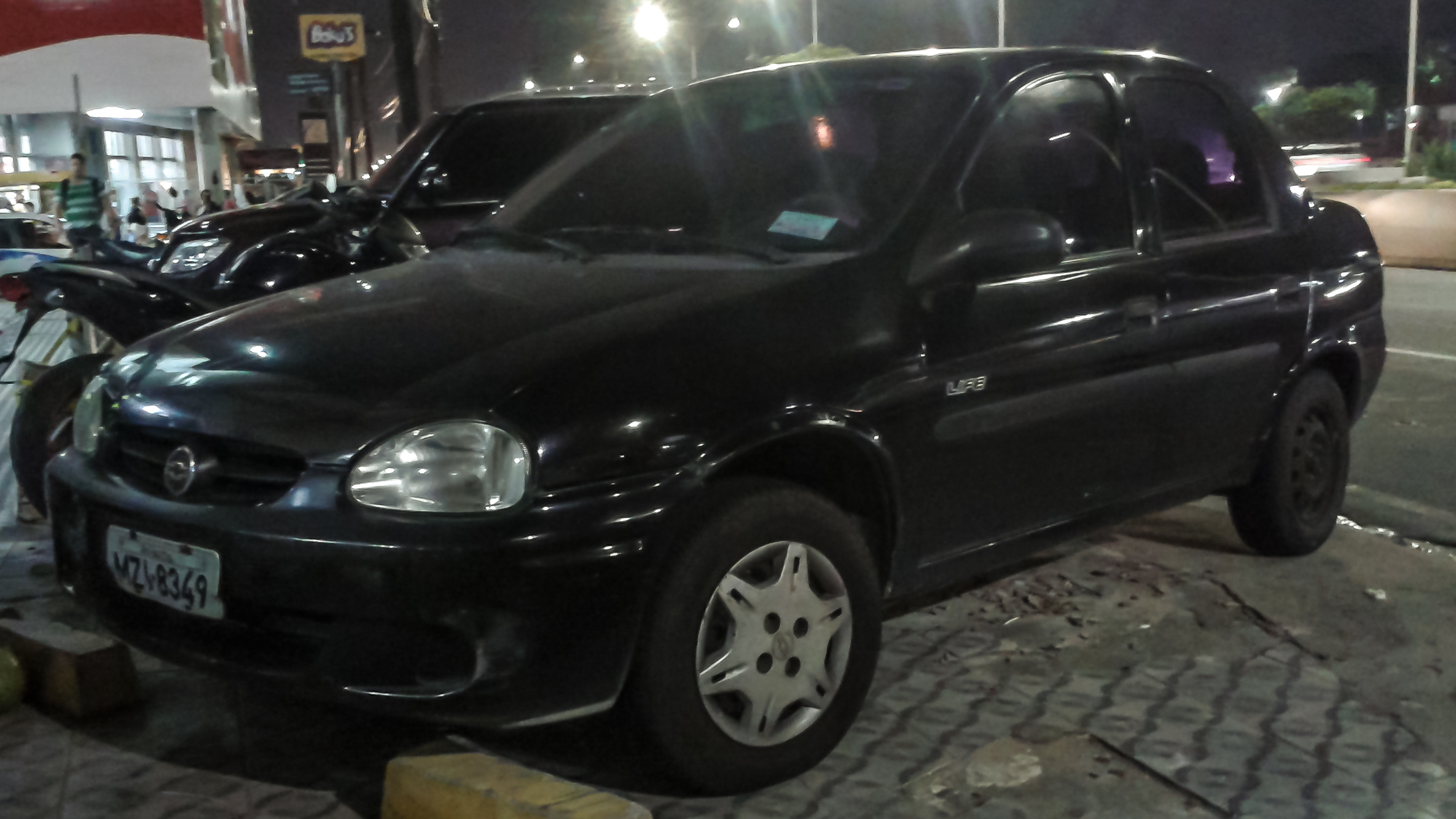
Corsa based Classic in Brazil

General Motors used the Chevrolet Classic nameplate for the following vehicles:

- The second generation Chevrolet Corsa, produced in Argentina and Brazil from 2002 to 2016
- The fifth generation Chevrolet Malibu, produced in the United States from 2004 to 2005 for use by fleets and car rental companies.
- The sixth generation Chevrolet Malibu, produced in the United States for 2008 for use by fleets and car rental companies.
- The seventh generation Chevrolet Malibu, to be produced in the United States for 2013 for use by fleets and car rental companies. GM shelved plans for the seventh generation Malibu Classic where the company decided to commence production of the eighth generation - the ninth generation Impala introduced in the 2006 model year took the place of the Chevrolet Classic as the Impala Limited.

Notably, the latter two Chevrolet Classics are the past generation versions of the Malibu that are continued to be produced for fleet sales, as the current generations are sold though retail.
