= Opel Corsa =

Supermini car manufactured by Opel

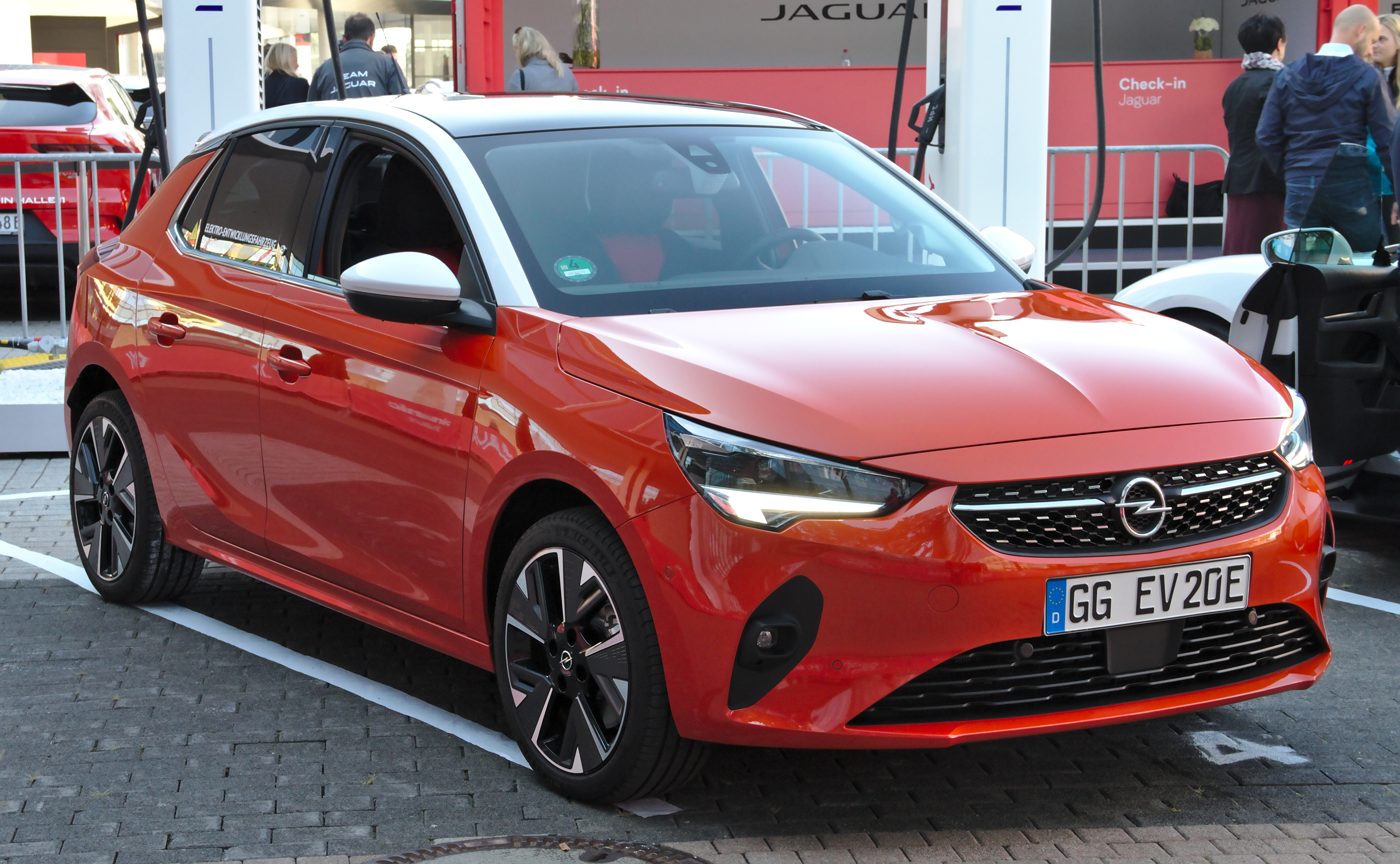
- Opel Corsa F (pre-facelift)

Overview
- Manufacturer: General Motors (1982–2017); PSA Group (2017–2021); Stellantis (2021–present)
- Also called: Vauxhall Corsa (United Kingdom); Vauxhall Nova (United Kingdom, 1982–1993); Holden Barina (Australia and New Zealand, 1993–2006)
- Production: 1982–present (Europe); 1993–present (Vauxhall brand)

Body and chassis
- Class: Supermini (B)
- Layout: Front-engine, front-wheel-drive

Chronology
- Predecessor: Opel Kadett City; Vauxhall Chevette

The Opel Corsa is a supermini car manufactured and marketed by Opel since 1982. The car is known as the Vauxhall Corsa in the United Kingdom. Before General Motors sold Opel and Vauxhall to PSA Group in 2017, the Corsa was also rebadged under the Chevrolet, Holden and Buick brands.

The Corsa was once the best-selling car in the world in 1998, recording 910,839 sales. At that time, the Corsa was assembled on four continents, marketed under five different marques and offered in five body styles. By 2007, over 18 million Corsas had been sold globally.

== Corsa A (S83; 1982) ==
Corsa A
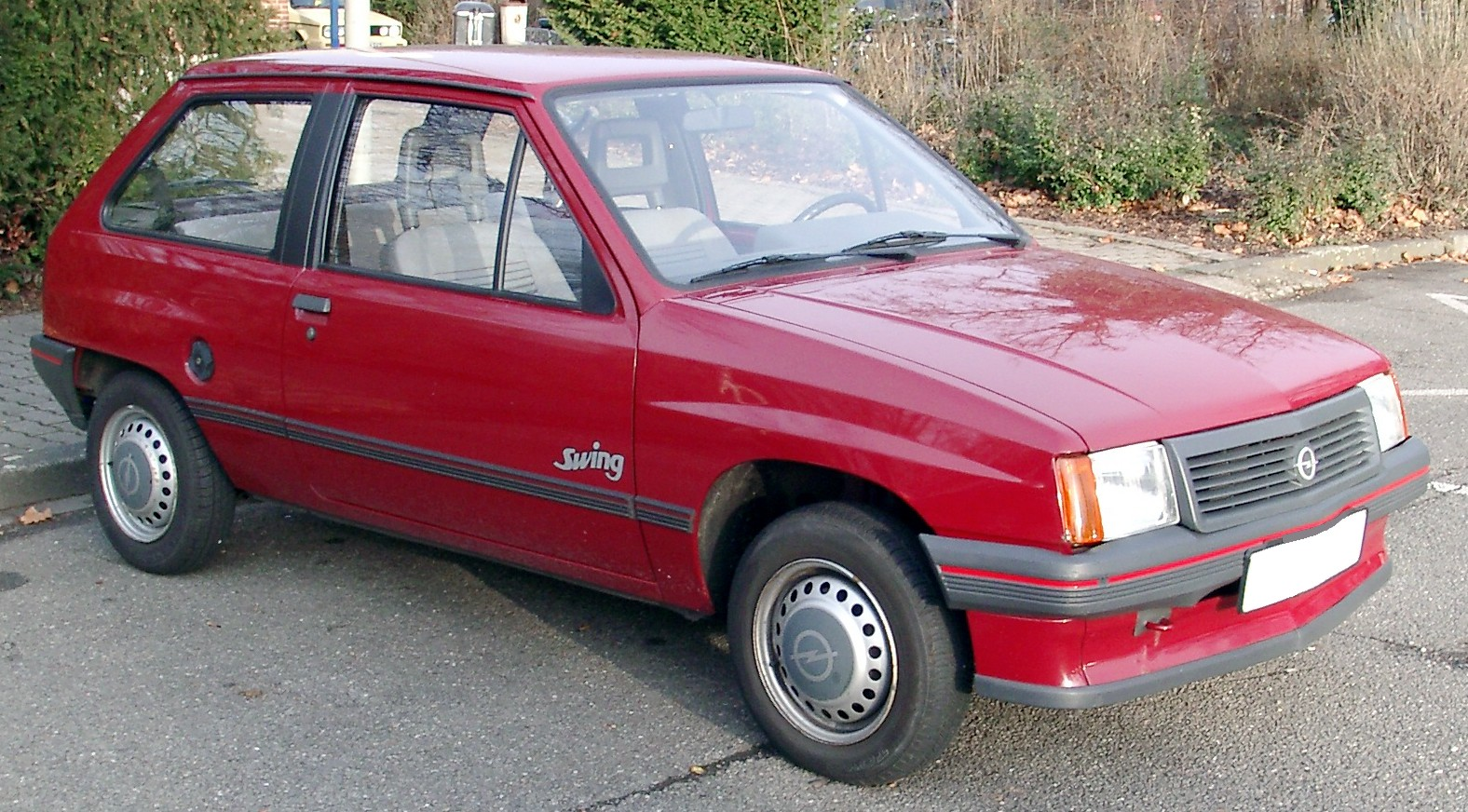

Overview
- Model code: S83
- Also called: Vauxhall Nova
- Production: 1982–1993
- Assembly: Spain: Zaragoza; Yugoslavia: Kikinda (IDA-Opel)

Body and chassis
- Body style: 3/5-door hatchback; 2/4-door saloon; 3-door van

Powertrain
- Engine: petrol: 993 cc 10S OHV I4; 1196 cc 12NC/E12N/E12GV OHV I4; 1196 cc 12ST I4; 1195 cc 12NV/C12NZ I4; 1297 cc 13NB/C13N I4; 1297 cc 13S/13SB I4; 1297 cc 13E I4; 1389 cc 14NV/C14NZ I4; 1389 cc C14SE I4; 1598 cc C16NZ/E16NZ I4; 1598 cc C16SE/E16SE I4; diesel: 1488 cc Isuzu 4EC1 I4; 1488 cc Isuzu T4EC1 TD I4
- Transmission: 4/5-speed manual

Dimensions
- Wheelbase: 2,343 mm (92.2 in)
- Length: 3,622–3,955 mm (142.6–155.7 in)
- Width: 1,532–1,540 mm (60.3–60.6 in)
- Height: 1,360–1,365 mm (53.5–53.7 in)
- Curb weight: 735–865 kg (1,620–1,907 lb)

The front-wheel drive Opel Corsa was first launched in September 1982. A two-seat, roadster "concept car" had been shown as a teaser six months earlier at Geneva. It went on sale first in France, Italy, and Spain — markets where small cars represented from 34 to 43 percent of overall automobile sales. Sales across the remainder of Europe were to have begun by March 1983. General Motors' internal code for the Corsa/Nova was the S-car. The S-car designation had originally been applied to an abandoned supermini proposal from the early 1970s, which evolved into the 3-door hatchback ("City") version of the Opel Kadett C/Vauxhall Chevette, for which the Corsa/Nova acted as a de facto replacement. The Corsa was GM Europe's entry into the burgeoning supermini market — a market in which Opel/Vauxhall were not yet represented, as the Kadett C/Chevette was not a true supermini in the sense that it was rear wheel drive, while its successor — the Kadett D/Astra — competed in the larger C-segment, thus leaving a gap at the bottom of the range. The new car would therefore follow in the template already set by established superminis such as the Fiat 127, VW Polo and Ford Fiesta in using a transverse-engined, front wheel drive layout.

Built in Zaragoza, Spain, the first Corsas were three-door hatchback and two-door saloon models, with four-door and five-door versions added in 1984. In certain markets, commercial "van" models were also sold, with or without rear windows depending on local requirements. In mainland Europe, the saloon versions were known as the "Corsa TR" until May 1985 and had subtly altered styling — the distinctive wheelarch blisters of the hatchbacks were deleted and the saloons used a traditional "eggcrate" grille instead of the hatchback's integrated bumper/four-bar grille. The saloons were intended to appeal to customers of the Opel Kadett C and Vauxhall Chevette who still desired a traditional three-box saloon shape — while it did not sell particularly well in most of Europe, the TR was popular in Spain and Portugal among other markets. While only taking ten percent of French Corsa sales during the car's first half-year, the TR represented half of all Corsas sold in Spain.

The basic trim level was called just the Corsa, which was followed by the Corsa Luxus, Corsa Berlina, and the sporty Corsa SR. The SR receives a spoiler which surrounds the rear window, alloy wheels, checkered sport seats, and a somewhat more powerful 70 PS (51 kW) engine. Six years later, the Corsa received a facelift, which included a new front fascia and some other minor changes. The models were called LS, GL, GLS, and GT.

The Corsa A was known in the United Kingdom market as the Vauxhall Nova —Nova being a legacy nameplate which had been used elsewhere in the GM empire with Corsa being rejected as it sounded too much like coarser. It launched in April 1983, following a seven-month-long union dispute due to British workers' anger over the car being built in Spain, in contrast to the rival Ford Fiesta and Austin Metro. In addition, there was a disparity concerning import tariffs, as while cars exported from Spain to the European Community were subject to tariffs of only 4.4%, those exported in the other direction were subject to tariffs of 36.7%.

Power first came from 1.0 L 45 PS, 1.2 L 55 PS, and 1.3 L 70 PS petrol engines. Initially, all engines were equipped with carburetors; fuel injection came later, but never for the 1.0. The engines used the GM Family I design, except for the 1.0 L and early 1.2 L engines, which were based on the venerable Opel OHV engine which had been used in the Opel Kadett in all of its four generations since 1962.

At the Frankfurt Motor Show in May 1987 (prior to the facelift) two new engines were added to the lineup: an Isuzu-built, 67 PS (49 kW) 1.5 L turbo diesel engine which was also used in the Isuzu Gemini, along with the sporty GSi model. The engines and most of the mechanical componentry were derived from those used in the Astra/Kadett.

=== Facelift ===
In September 1987 the Corsa received a light facelift, with a new grille that was now the same on hatchbacks and saloons, an updated interior, and other slight changes. For the 1989 model year, the 1.3 was bored out to 1.4-litres. Power remained the same, although torque increased.

A rare "Sport" model was produced in 1985 to homologate for the sub 1,300 cc class of Group A for the British Rally Championship. These Sport models were white and came with unique vinyl decals, a 13SB engine with twin Weber 40 DCOE carburettors, an optional bespoke camshaft, a replacement rear silencer, and few luxuries. This gave 93 hp and a top speed of 112 mph (180 km/h) with a 0–60 mph (0–97 km/h) time of 8.9 seconds. These are by far the rarest models (500 produced).

A 1.6 L multi point fuel-injected engine with 101 PS (74 kW) at 5600 rpm (98 PS or 72 kW in the catalysed version) and capable of 186 km/h (116 mph) was added to the Corsa/Nova at the 1987 Frankfurt Motor Show, giving decent performance and being badged as a GSi ("Nova GTE" in pre-facelift models in the United Kingdom, later models were all called GSi).

The GSi's engine mapping had been carried out by Opel tuning specialists Irmscher. A model with the 82 PS (60 kW) 1.4 L multi-point fuel-injected engine, which was otherwise mechanically identical to the GSi, also became available as the Nova SRi in the United Kingdom. In January 1988, a turbocharged version of the Isuzu diesel engine was introduced, with power increased to 67 PS (49 kW).

The design was freshened in September 1990, with new bumpers, headlights, grille, and interior, but it was clearly recognisable as a gentle makeover of an early 1980s design when it had to compete with the latest two all-new superminis in Europe – the Peugeot 106 and the Renault Clio. The 1992 model year saw the 1.0-litre models dropped from the line up, as the Opel OHV engine could not comply with the upcoming Euro 1 emission standard.

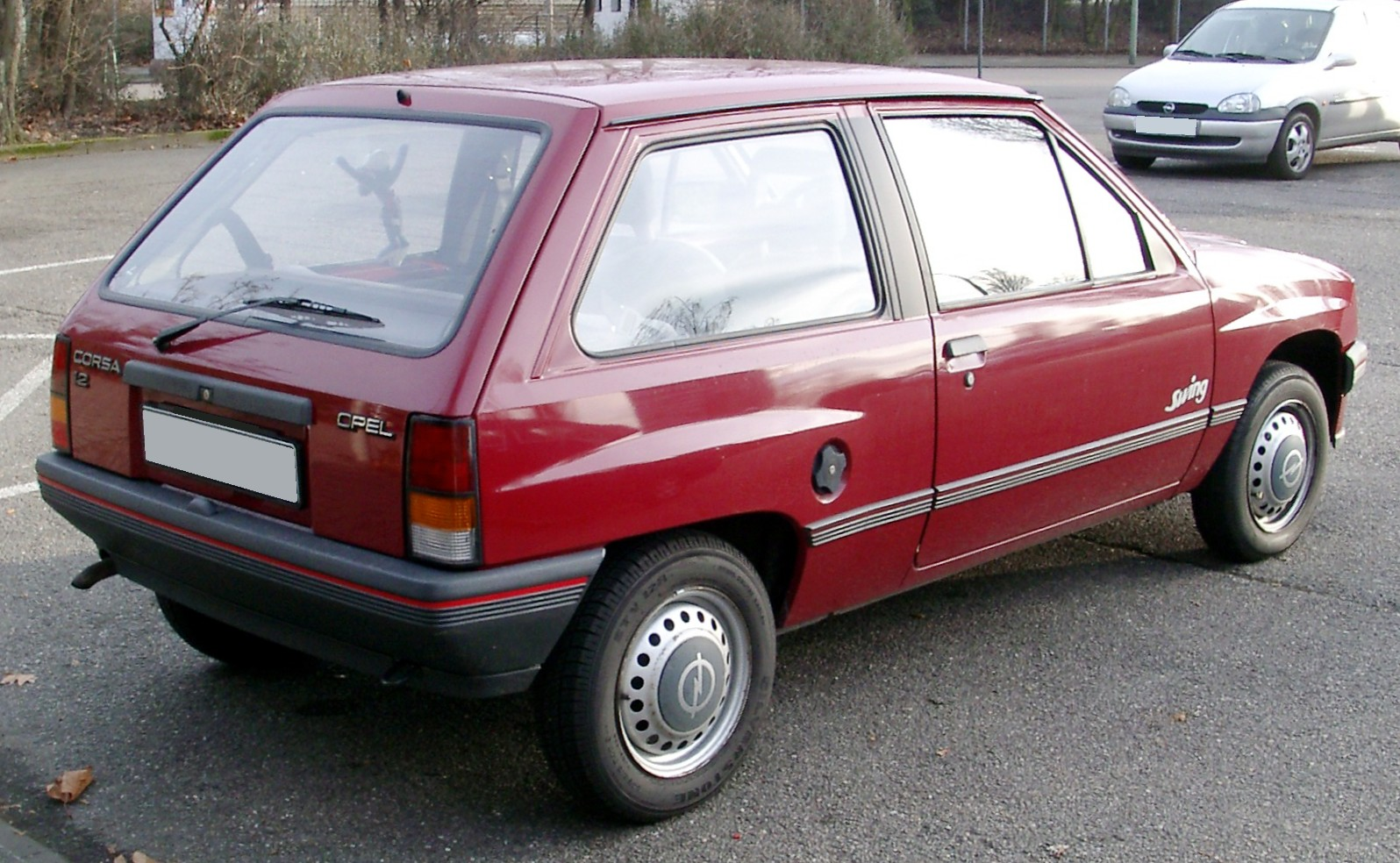
Rear view, 1987 facelift model

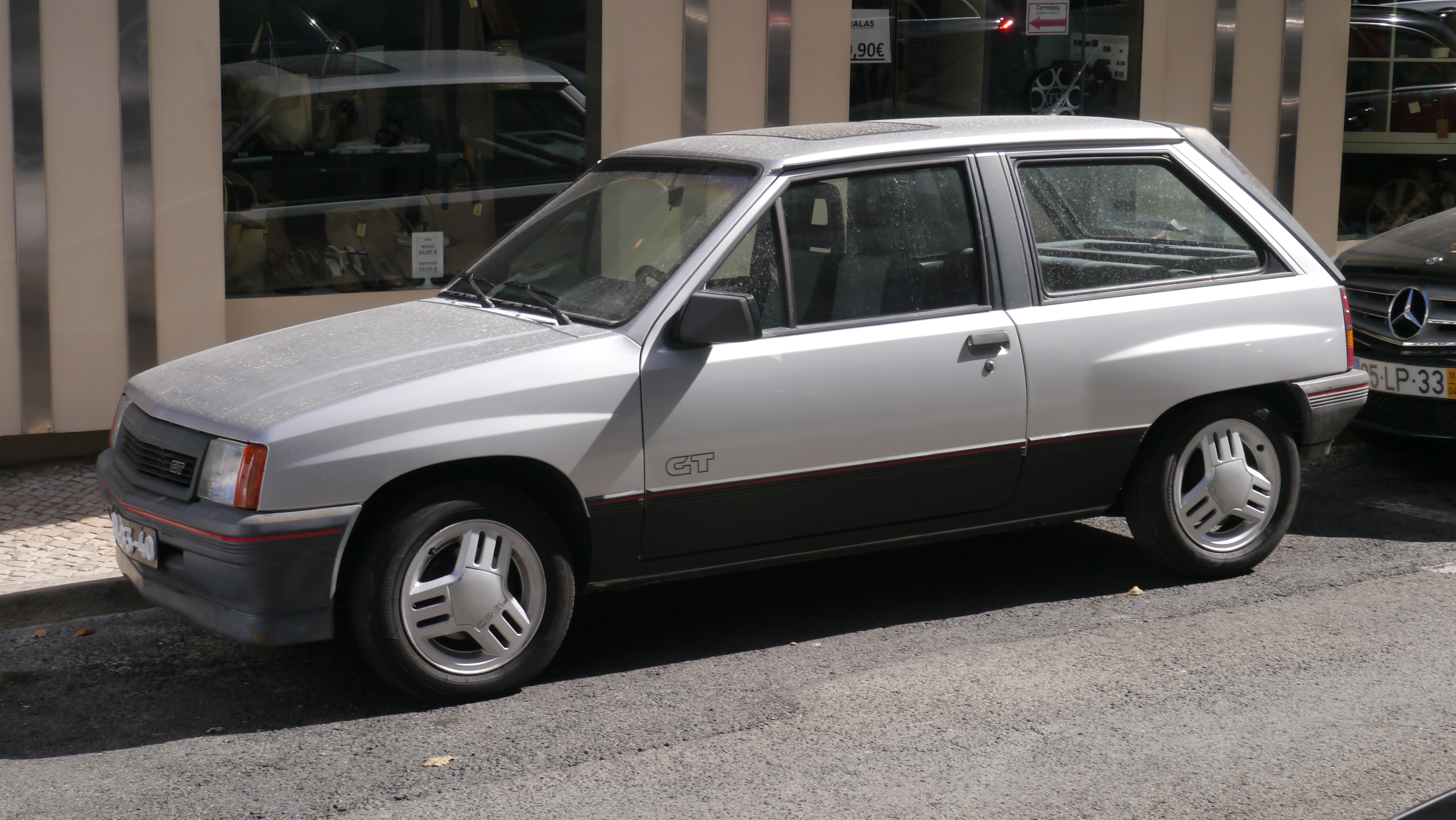
Opel Corsa GT (pre-facelift)

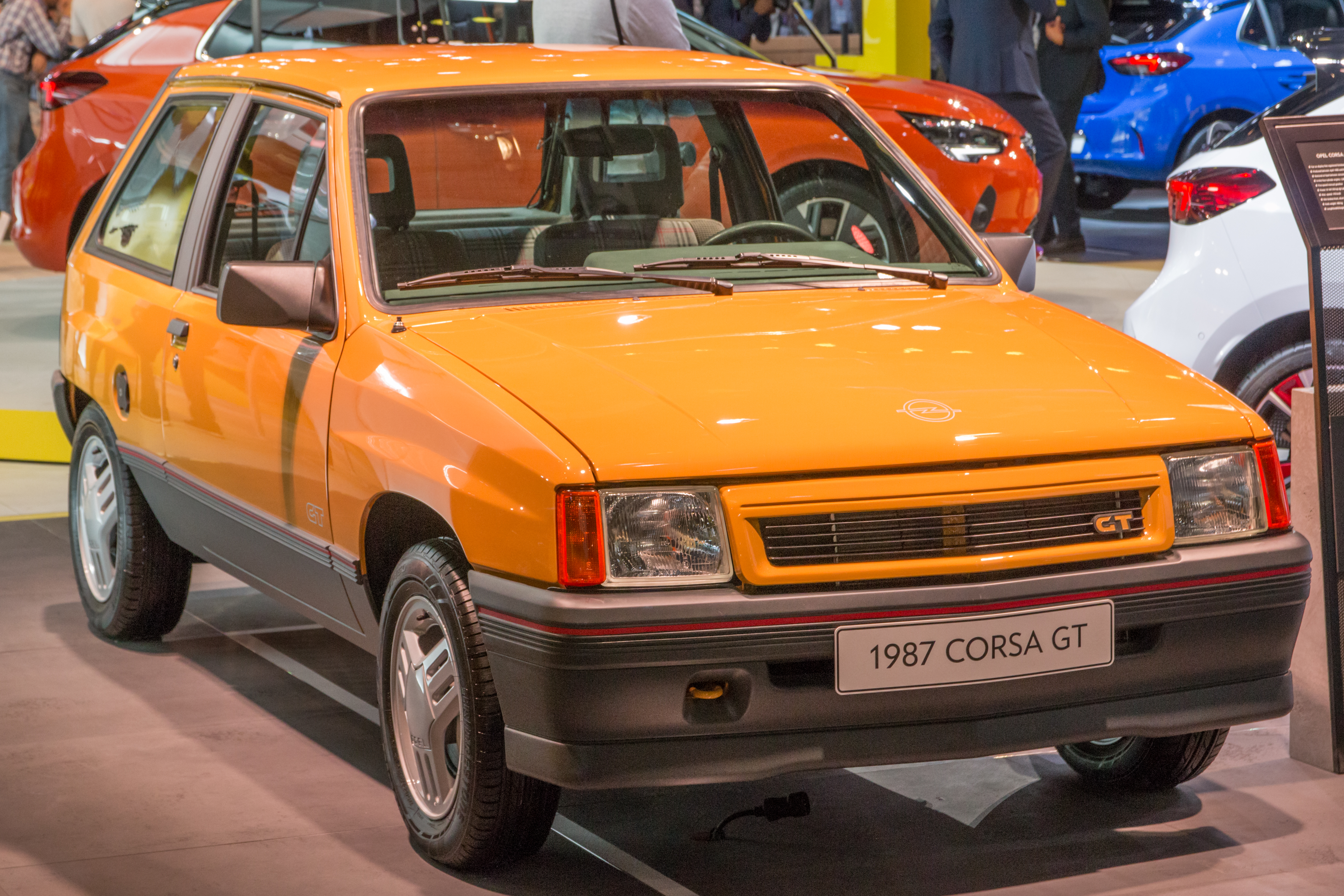
Opel Corsa GT 1.3 (1987)

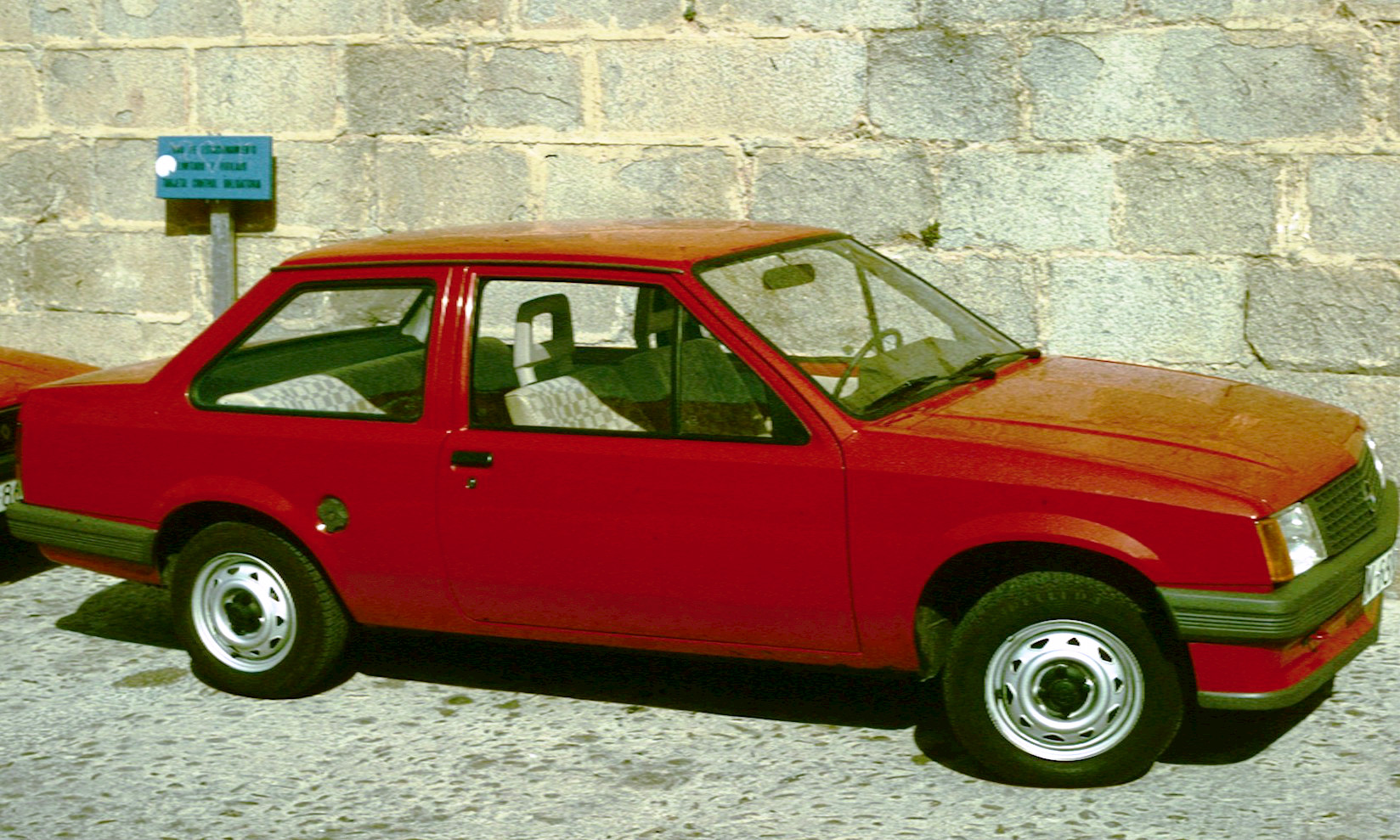
Opel Corsa TR two-door (1982–1987)

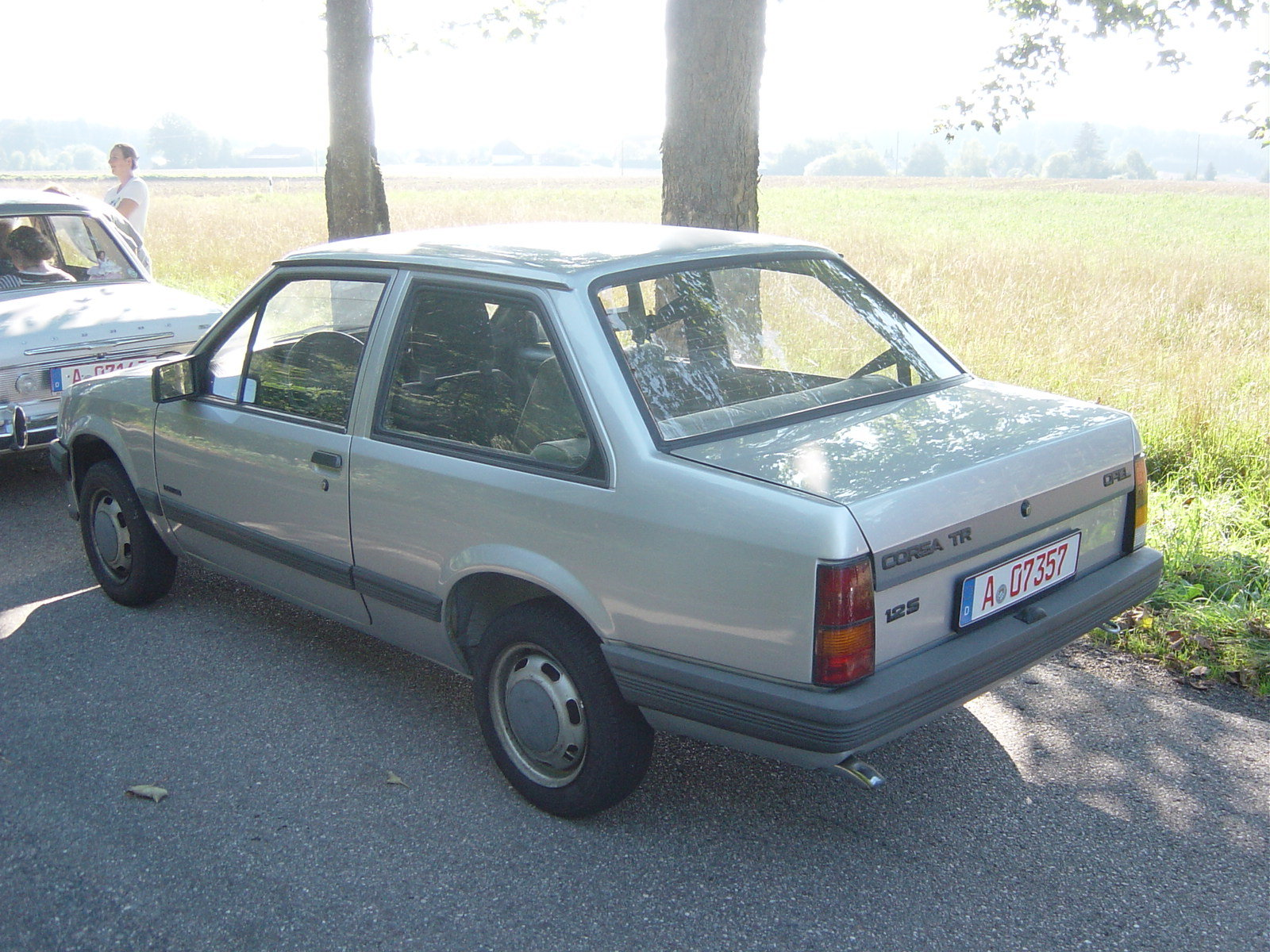
Rear view

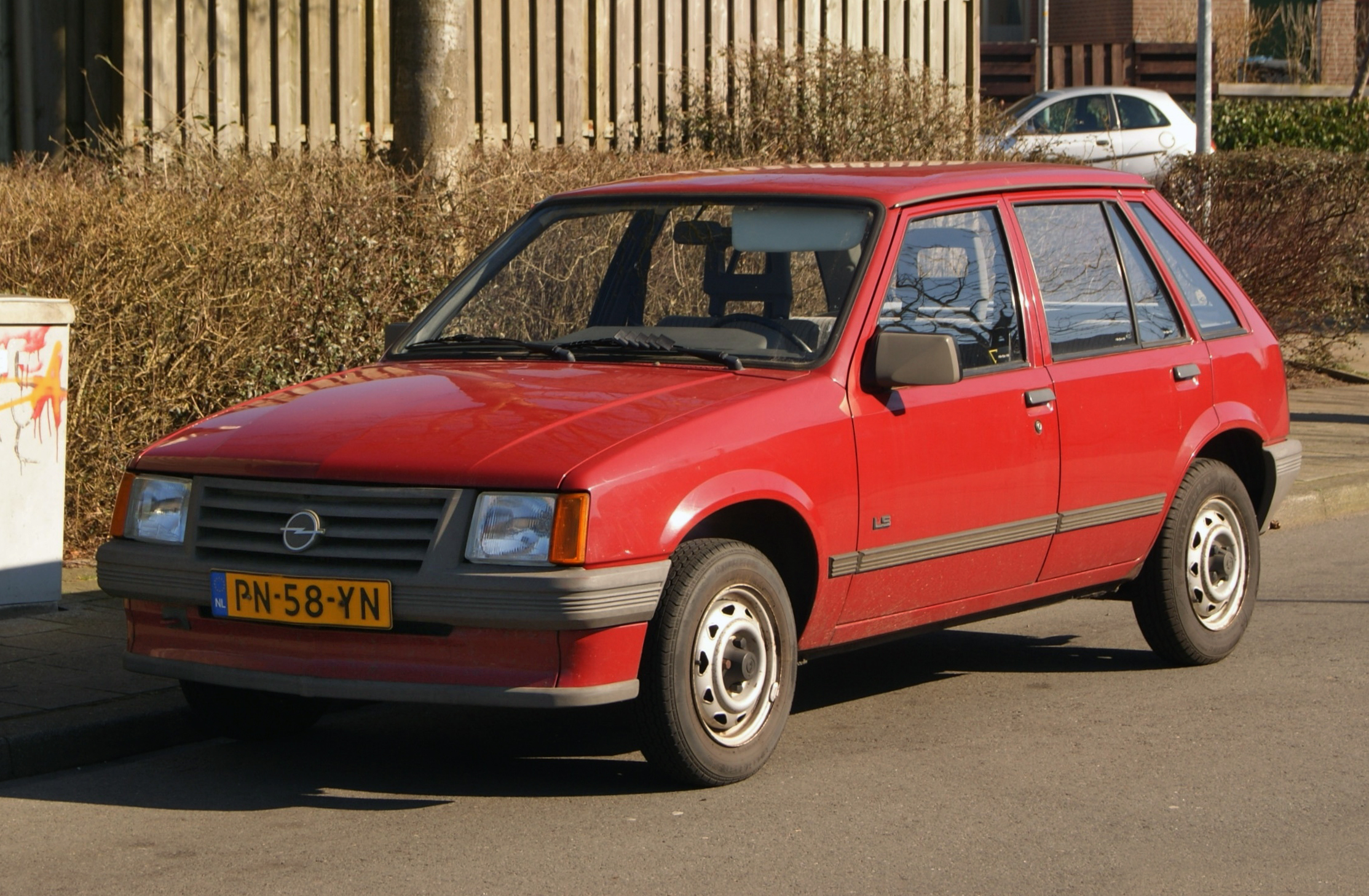
Opel Corsa five-door (1985–1987), note different grille from Corsa TR

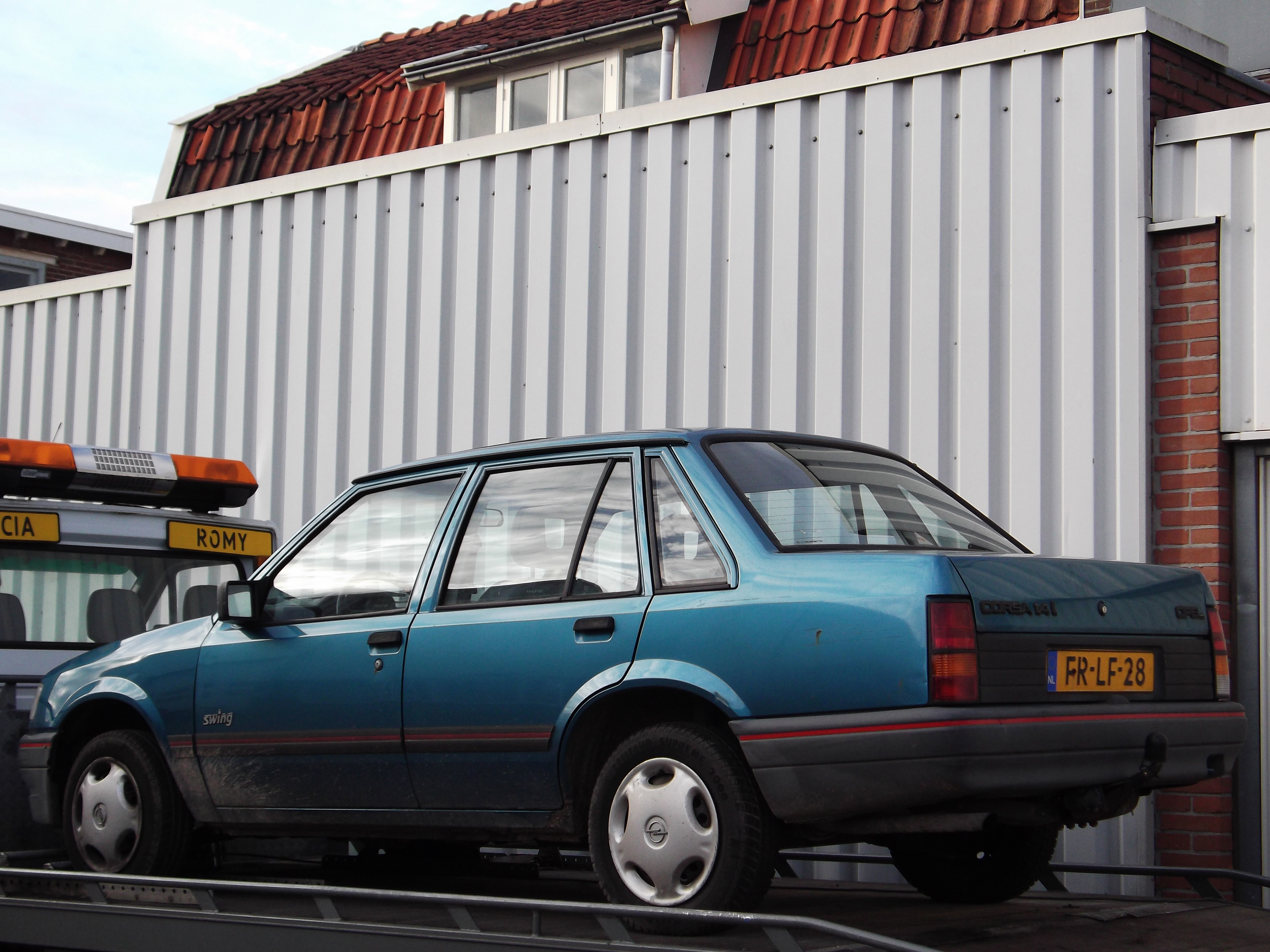
Opel Corsa four-door (1990–1993; rear)

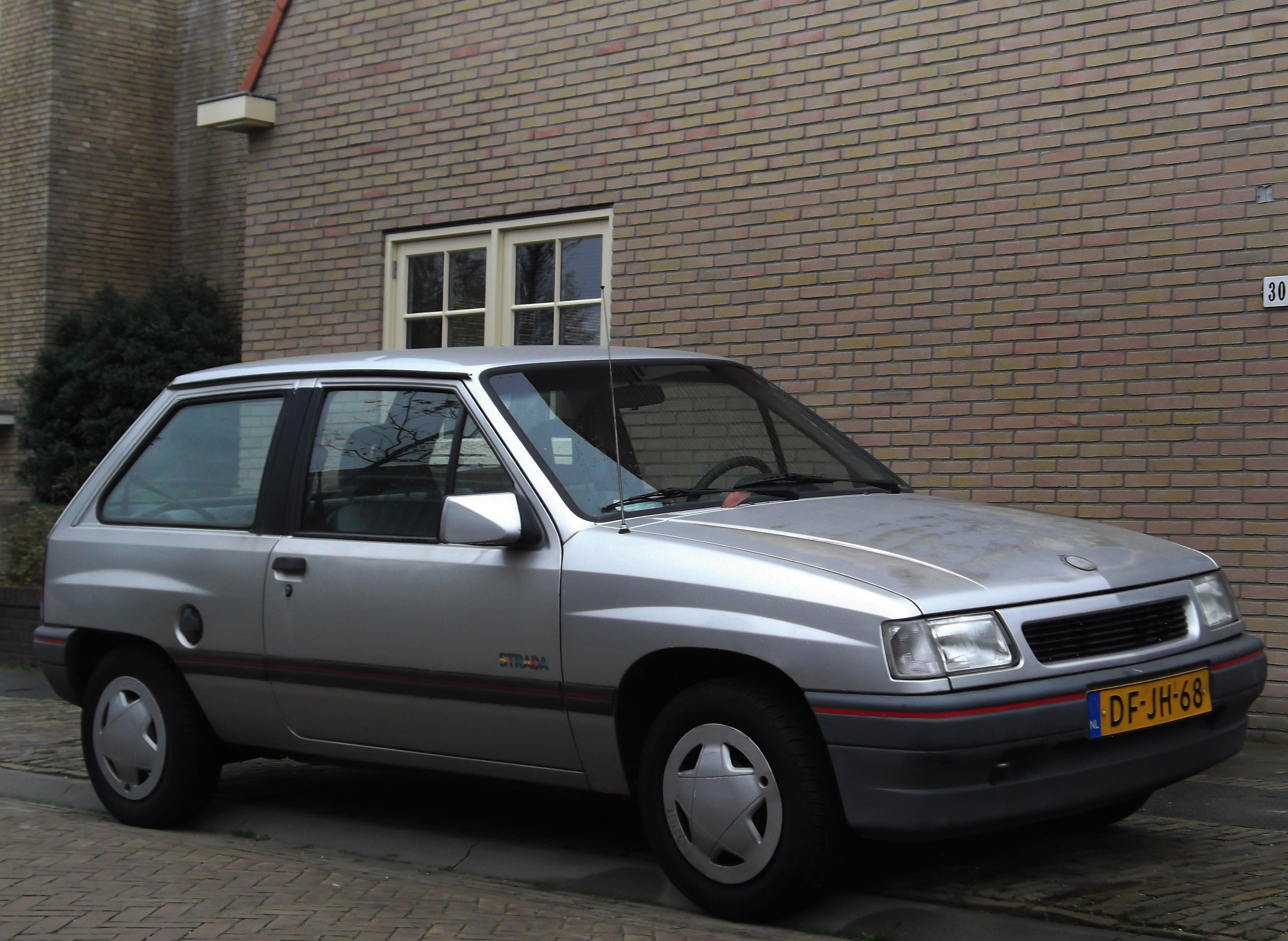
1990–1993 facelift model, "Strada" special edition (NL)

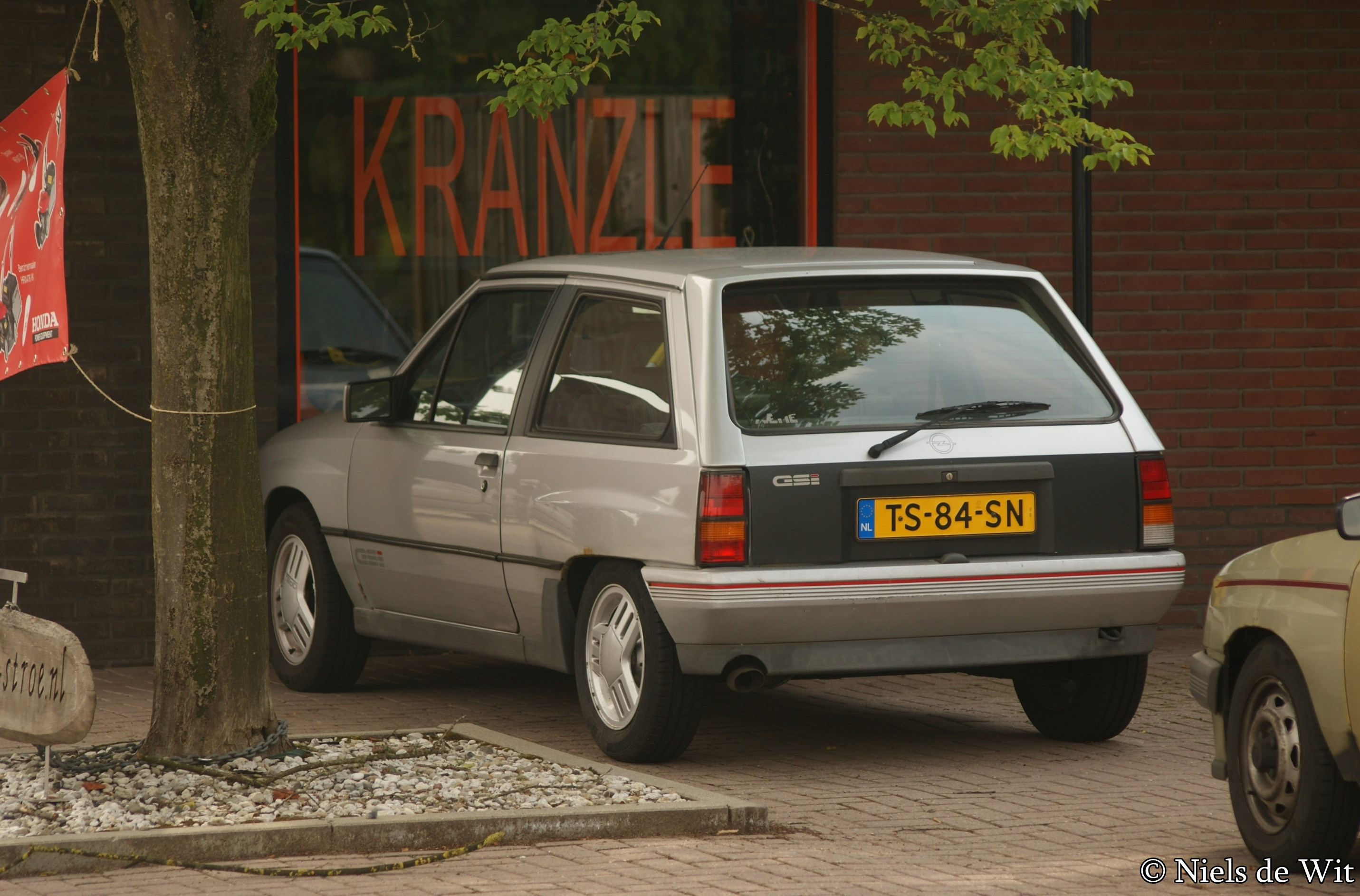
1988 Opel Corsa GSi (rear)

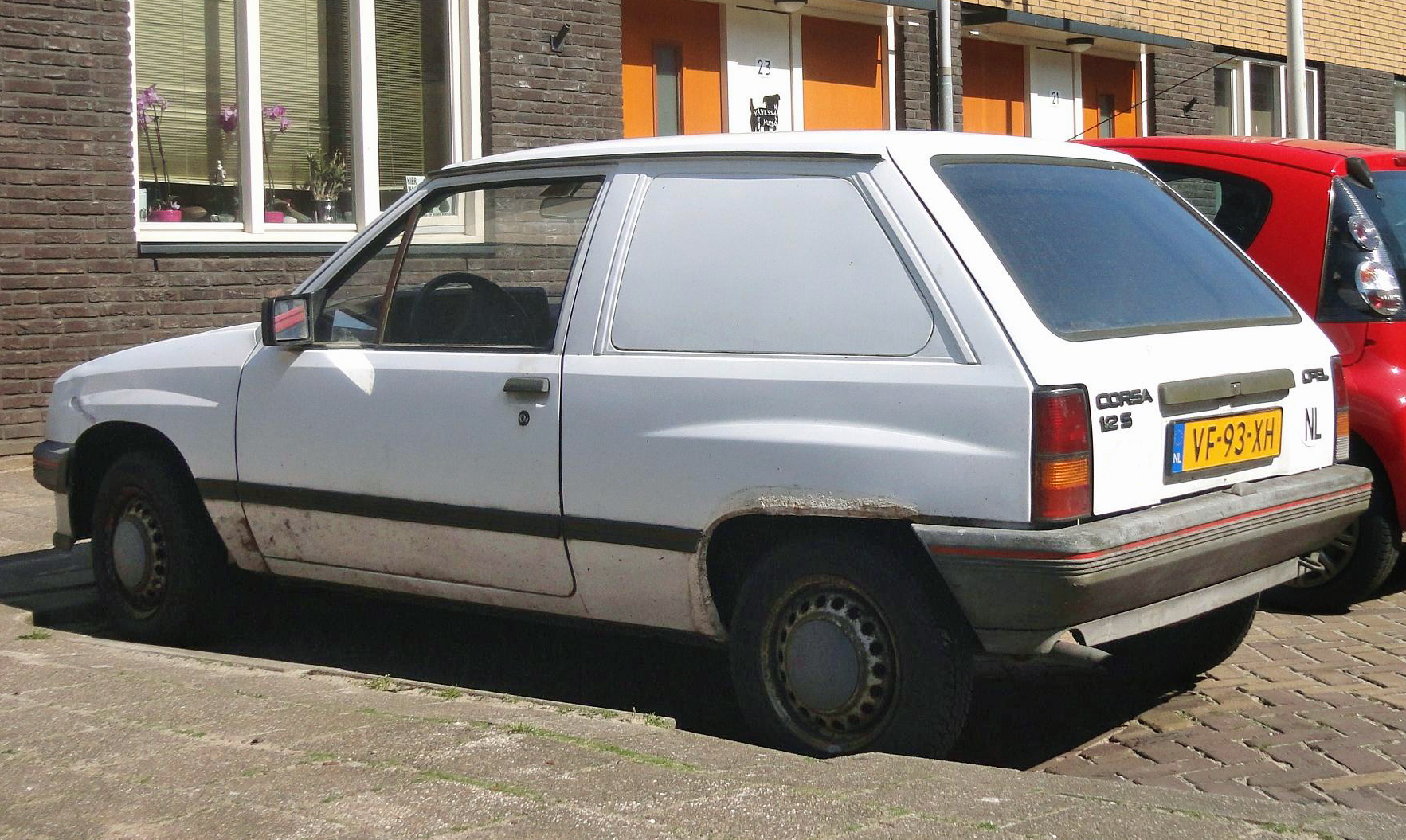
1989 Opel Corsa Van

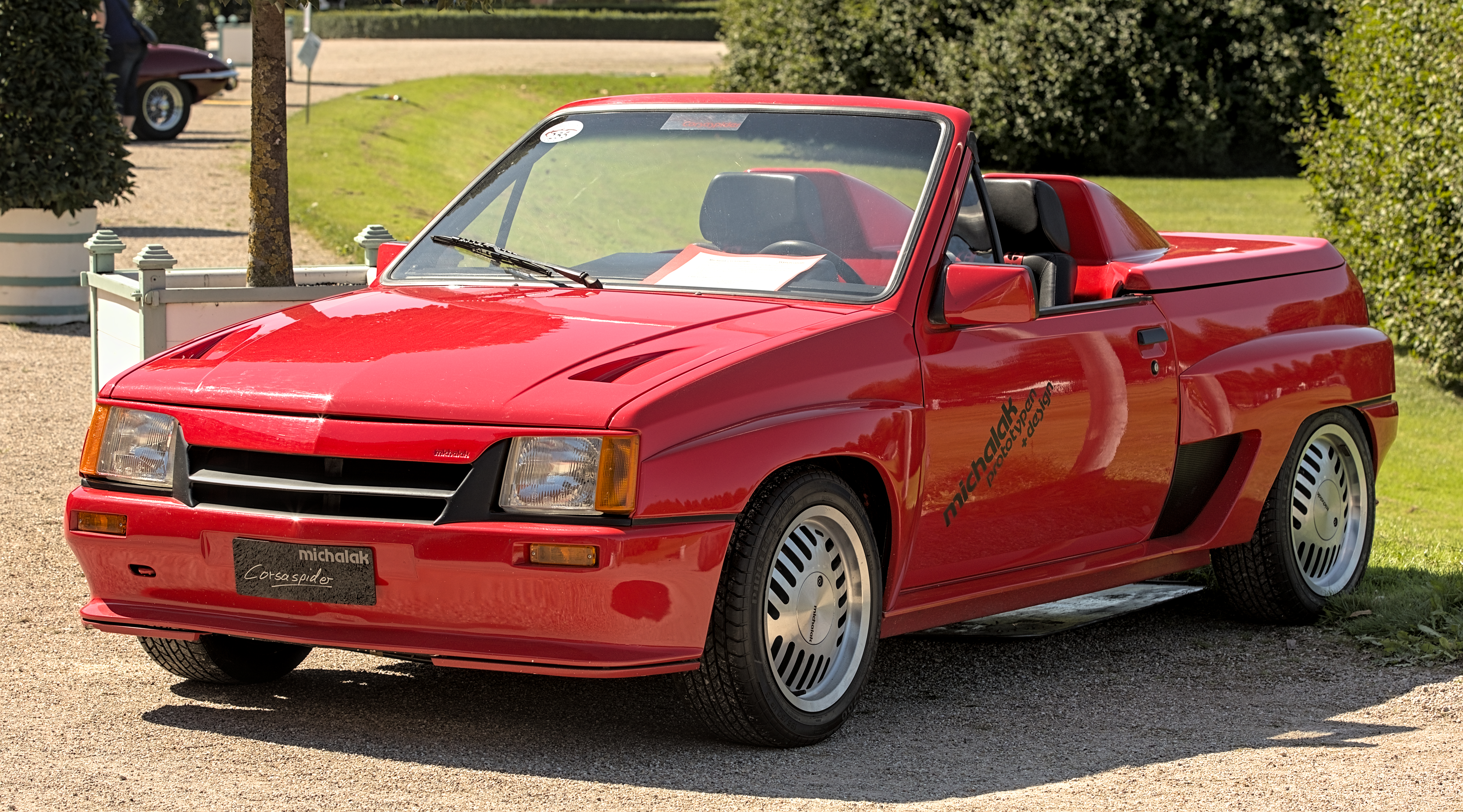
The Michalak Spider was inspired by the 1982 Corsa roadster concept car

=== Vauxhall Nova ===
The Corsa A was rebadged as the Vauxhall Nova between April 1983 and March 1993 for the United Kingdom only, as it had been decided to phase out the Vauxhall brand entirely in favor of Opel in the Republic of Ireland. ("Nova" is a trademark which GM had already used in North America). It effectively replaced the aging Chevette, which finished production in January 1984. Nearly 500,000 Novas were sold in Britain over the next ten years, but by February 2014, only 1,757 were still on the road. In its best year, 1989, it was Britain's seventh best selling car with more than 70,000 sales. All Nova models were manufactured in Spain, with the first customers in the United Kingdom taking delivery of their cars in April 1983. It gave Vauxhall a much needed modern competitor in the supermini market in the United Kingdom, as the Chevette was older than the majority of its main competitors which consisted of the Ford Fiesta and the Austin Metro. With the late 1990 facelift a small van version arrived, called the Vauxhall Nova Van. In the 2000s, it was publicised that Novas could be stolen easily by removing the hazard lights switch and putting it back into the dashboard upside-down and this would start the ignition.

Sales in the United Kingdom were strong right up to the end, but by the time the last Nova was built in the beginning of 1993, it was looking very dated in comparison to more modern rivals like the Peugeot 106 and the Renault Clio. Vauxhall dropped the Nova name in 1993 when their version of the Opel Corsa B made its debut, and later models were sold as the Vauxhall Corsa instead. This was the second Vauxhall to adopt the same model name as the Opel version, the first being the Senator.

A television advert in 1987 featured the Ritchie Valens hit "La Bamba" playing in the background, and used CGI to allow a Nova to drive over vehicles in a busy city. Another advert from 1990 featured a Nova as a pet, CGI allowing it to jump through a traffic jam and briefly play a hotrod whilst stopped at traffic lights. The end featured a homage to Wacky Races, with the Nova laughing like Muttley. This advert featured Angus Deayton.

The Vauxhall Nova became notorious due to how easy it was to steal. One could simply flip the hazard warning light and via a bump start, the car would still move, even without the ignition key.

==== Motorsport ====
From 1990 to 1993, the Vauxhall Nova Challenge ran as part of the British Rallycross Championship.

In 1992, John Leslie took part in the series for a feature on Blue Peter.

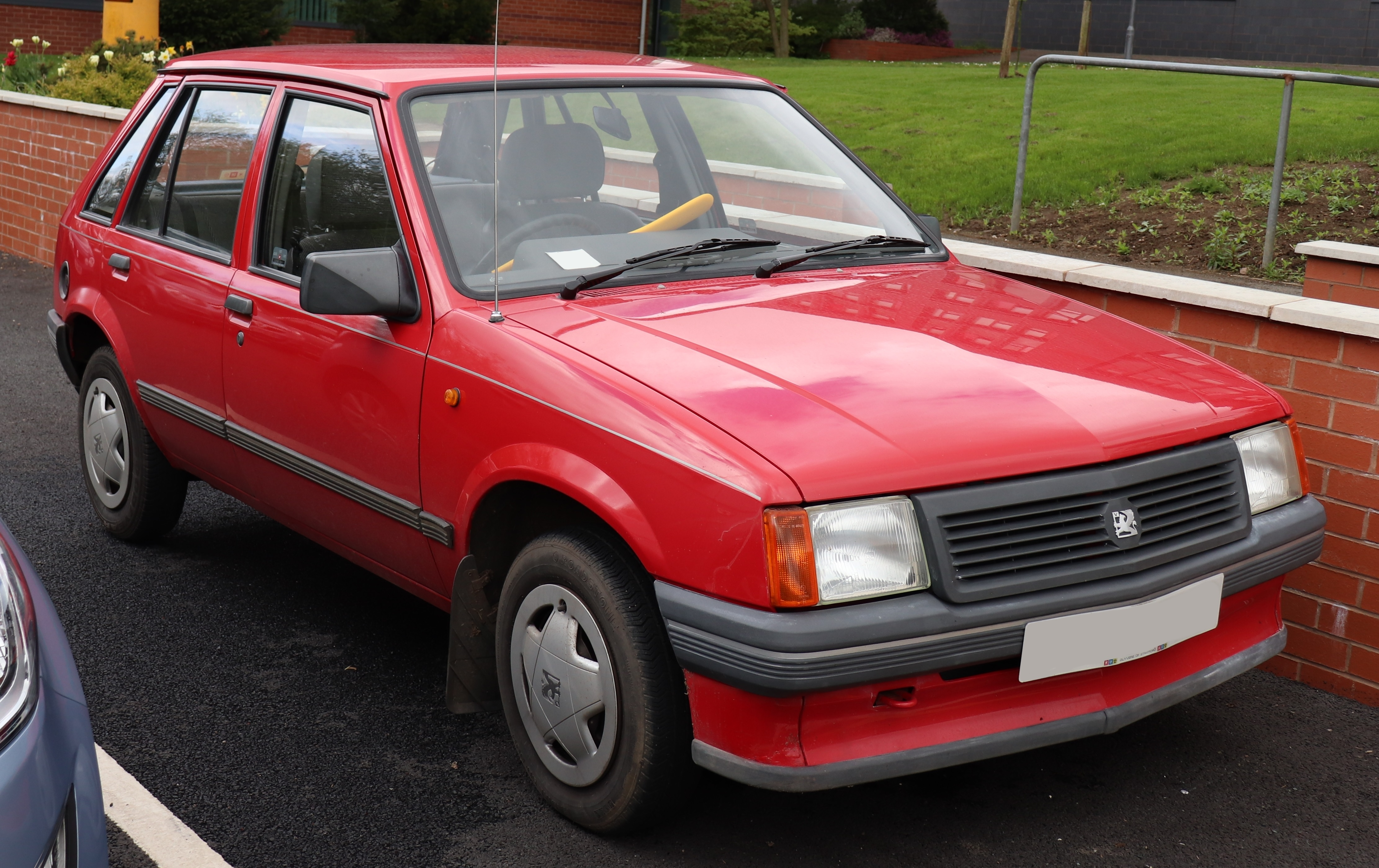
Vauxhall Nova five-door (1989–1990)

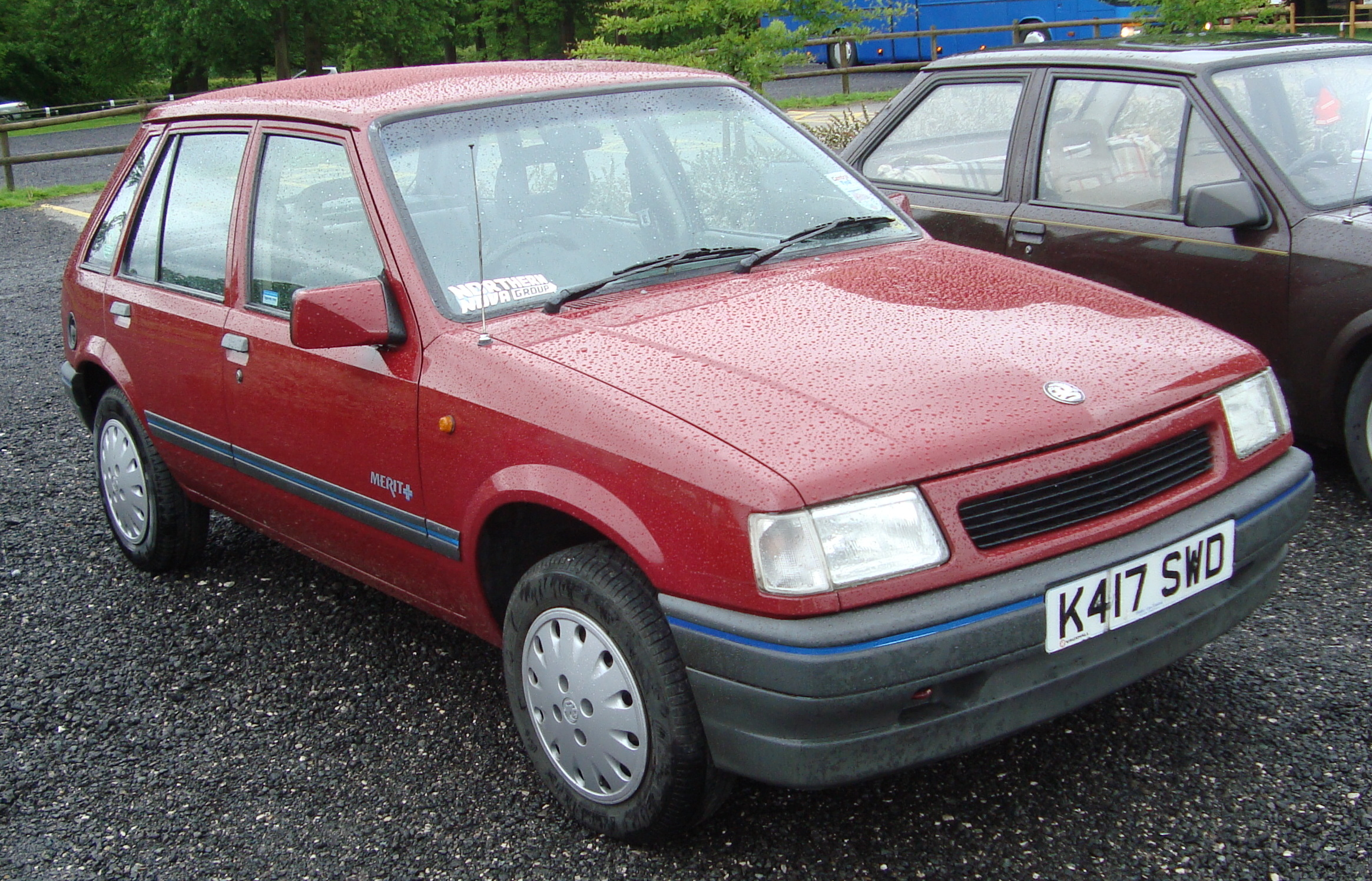
Vauxhall Nova five-door (1990–1993)

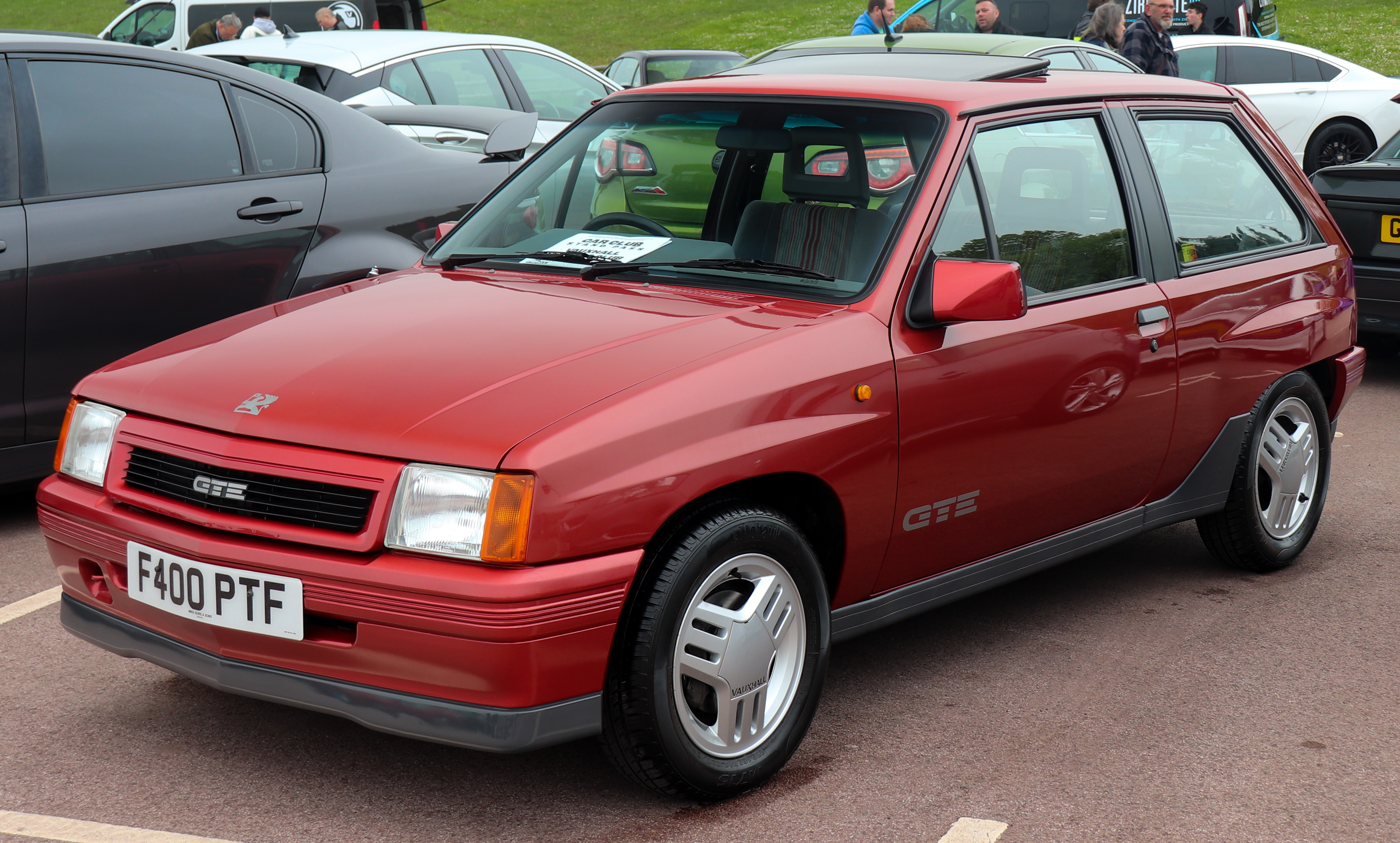
Vauxhall Nova GTE

== Corsa B (S93; 1993) ==
Corsa B
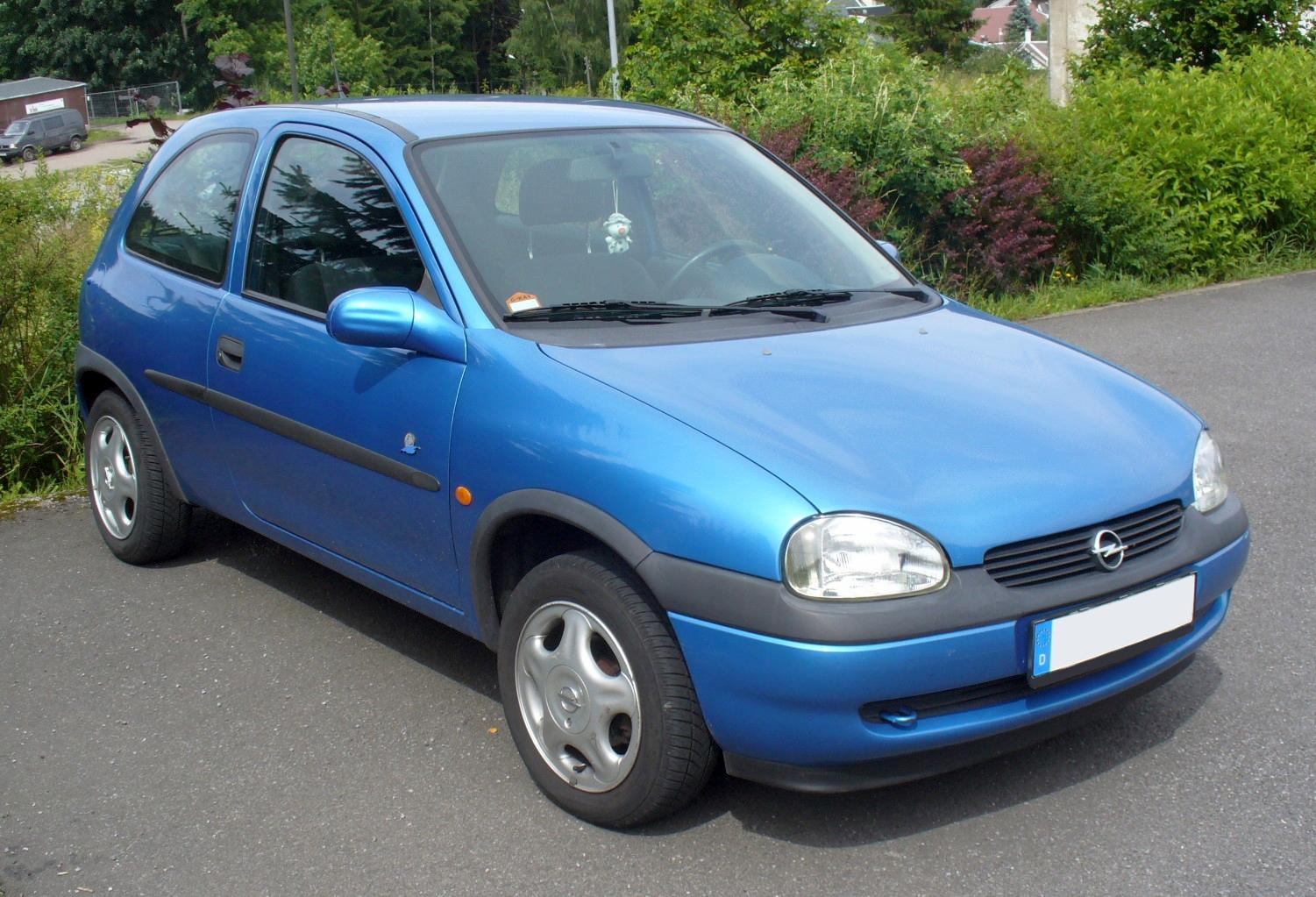

Overview
- Model code: S93
- Also called: Vauxhall Corsa; Chevrolet Corsa; Chevrolet Corsa Classic; Chevrolet Corsa Plus (Chile); Chevrolet Chevy (Mexico); Chevrolet Classic; Chevrolet Sail (China); Buick Sail (China); Holden Barina (Australasia); Opel Vita (Japan); Jilin Jiangbei Meilu JJ7090 (China)
- Production: 1993–2000 (Europe, Turkey and Thailand); 1994–2016 (Brazil); 1997–2016 (Argentina); 1995–2011 (Mexico); 1996–2007 (South Africa); 2000–2005 (India); 1993–1996 (China; Meilu JJ7090; CKD); 2001–2005 (China; Buick); 2005–2009 (China; Chevrolet)
- Assembly: Germany: Eisenach (Opel Eisenach); Spain: Zaragoza; Colombia: Bogotá (GM Colombia); Mexico: Ramos Arizpe; Argentina: Alvear (GM Argentina); Brazil: São Caetano do Sul (GM Brazil); Venezuela: Valencia (GM Venezuela); South Africa: Port Elizabeth (GM South Africa); Egypt: 6 October City (GM Egypt); China: Jilin (Jilin Jiangbei), Shanghai (Shanghai GM); India: Gurgaon (GM India); Thailand: Rayong (GM Thailand); Ecuador: Quito (AYMESA); Turkey: Torbalı, İzmir Province
- Designer: Hideo Kodama

Body and chassis
- Body style: 3/5-door hatchback; 4-door saloon; 5-door estate car; 2-door coupé utility (pickup); 2-door convertible
- Platform: GM4200 platform
- Related: Opel Combo B; Opel Tigra A; Chevrolet Celta; Chevrolet Sail

Powertrain
- Engine: petrol: 1.0 L X10XE I3; 1.2 L 12NZ/C12NZ/X12SZ I4; 1.2 L X12XE 16V I4; 1.4 L C14NZ/C14SE/X14SZ I4; 1.4 L X14XE 16V I4; 1.6 L C16XE/X16XE 16V I4; diesel: 1.5 L Isuzu 4EC1 I4; 1.5 L Isuzu T4EC1 turbo I4; 1.7 L Isuzu 4EE1 I4
- Transmission: 4-speed manual 5-speed manual 4-speed Aisin AF13 automatic

Dimensions
- Wheelbase: 2,443 mm (96.2 in) (hatchback, saloon, estate car); 2,480 mm (97.6 in) (pickup)
- Length: 3,729 mm (146.8 in) (hatchback, 1992–1998); 3,741 mm (147.3 in) (hatchback, 1998–2000); 4,026 mm (158.5 in) (saloon, estate car); 4,153 mm (163.5 in) (pickup)
- Width: 1,610 mm (63.4 in)
- Height: 1,440 mm (56.7 in)

In April 1993, the Corsa B was unveiled and in the United Kingdom, Vauxhall dropped the Nova name, with the car from now being known as the Corsa. In May 1994, it was launched by Holden in Australia, as the Barina, replacing a version of the Suzuki Swift sold under that name. This proved a success, and was the first Spanish built car to be sold in significant volumes in the Australian market.

Unlike the previous model, there was no saloon version for the European market, but one was designed in Brazil for the Latin American market, as saloons were much preferred to hatchbacks there. This was also introduced in South Africa and India. An estate car, panel van and pickup truck were also introduced, and a convertible version was produced for the Australian market, called the Holden Barina Cabrio. Vauxhall also marketed a limited edition of the cabriolet in the UK from 1998 to 1999, as the Vauxhall Corsa Cabriolet. Chevrolet Corsa Saloon, Chevrolet Corsa Pick Up and Chevrolet Corsa Wagon were Designed by Wagner Montes Cla Dias in the GM Brasil Studios in São Caetano do Sul.

Italy was the only European country where the Argentinian-built estate version was offered, which meant that the Italian importer had to shoulder the entire cost of homologation. In Italy, the estate was offered with a 1.4-litre 16-valve petrol engine or the 1.7-litre naturally aspirated diesel. The Corsa also spawned a small coupé, named the Opel Tigra.

Four-cylinder power came from 1.2, 1.4, and 1.6 litre Family 1 petrol engines, as well as an economical 1.5 L turbodiesel engine. Most cars received a five-speed manual transmission, although a four-speed automatic was also available with certain engines. In the first few years, a four-speed manual was also available, only coupled to the smallest 1.2-litre engine.

1.0 L three cylinder and 1.2 L four-cylinder Family 0 economy version was launched in 1997, and a Lotus-tuned suspension was added as well as an exterior refresh.

The saloon and estate car versions were produced in China by Shanghai GM as Buick Sail and Buick Sail S-RV, respectively from June 2001 to February 2005. That year, they received a facelift and became known as the Chevrolet Sail and SRV. In September 2006, Chile became the first country outside China to receive the Chinese assembled Sail; it is called the Chevrolet Corsa Plus there, available as a four-door saloon with a 1.6 L 92 PS (68 kW) engine. The Corsa Plus includes dual front airbags, anti-lock brakes, air conditioning, electric windows and central locking as standard equipment.

In India, the hatchback, saloon and estate car versions were sold as the Corsa Sail, Corsa (or Corsa Joy) and Corsa Swing respectively until the end of 2005. The hatchback model was still being produced, and extensively marketed in South Africa as the Corsa Lite under the Opel branding until 2009; at which point it was discontinued.

In Thailand, the Corsa was available as an Opel with a fuel-injected 8V 1.4-litre engine and "Joy" and "Swing" variants, both available with three or five-door and either a manual or an automatic gearbox.

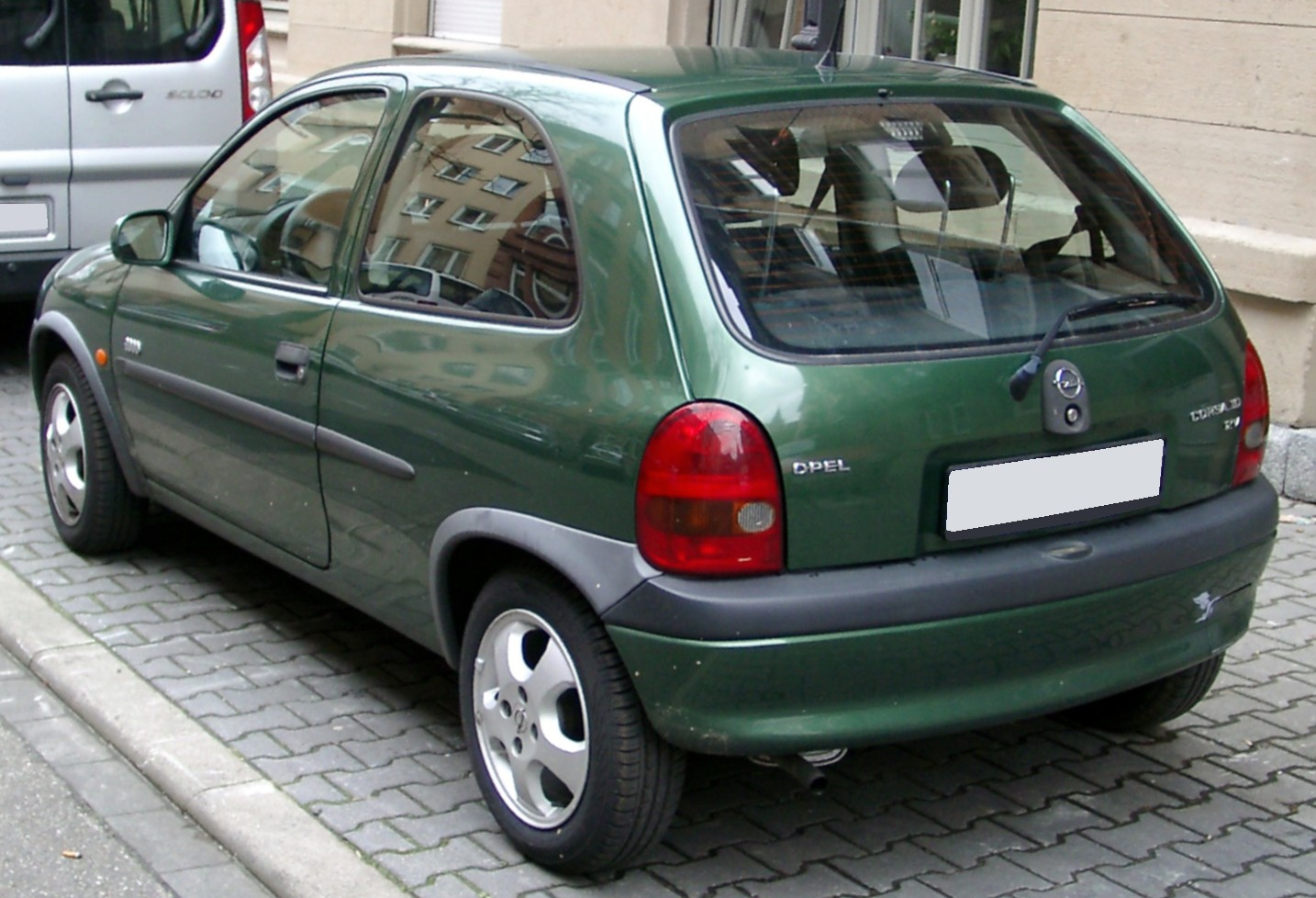
Opel Corsa three-door
(1997–2000)

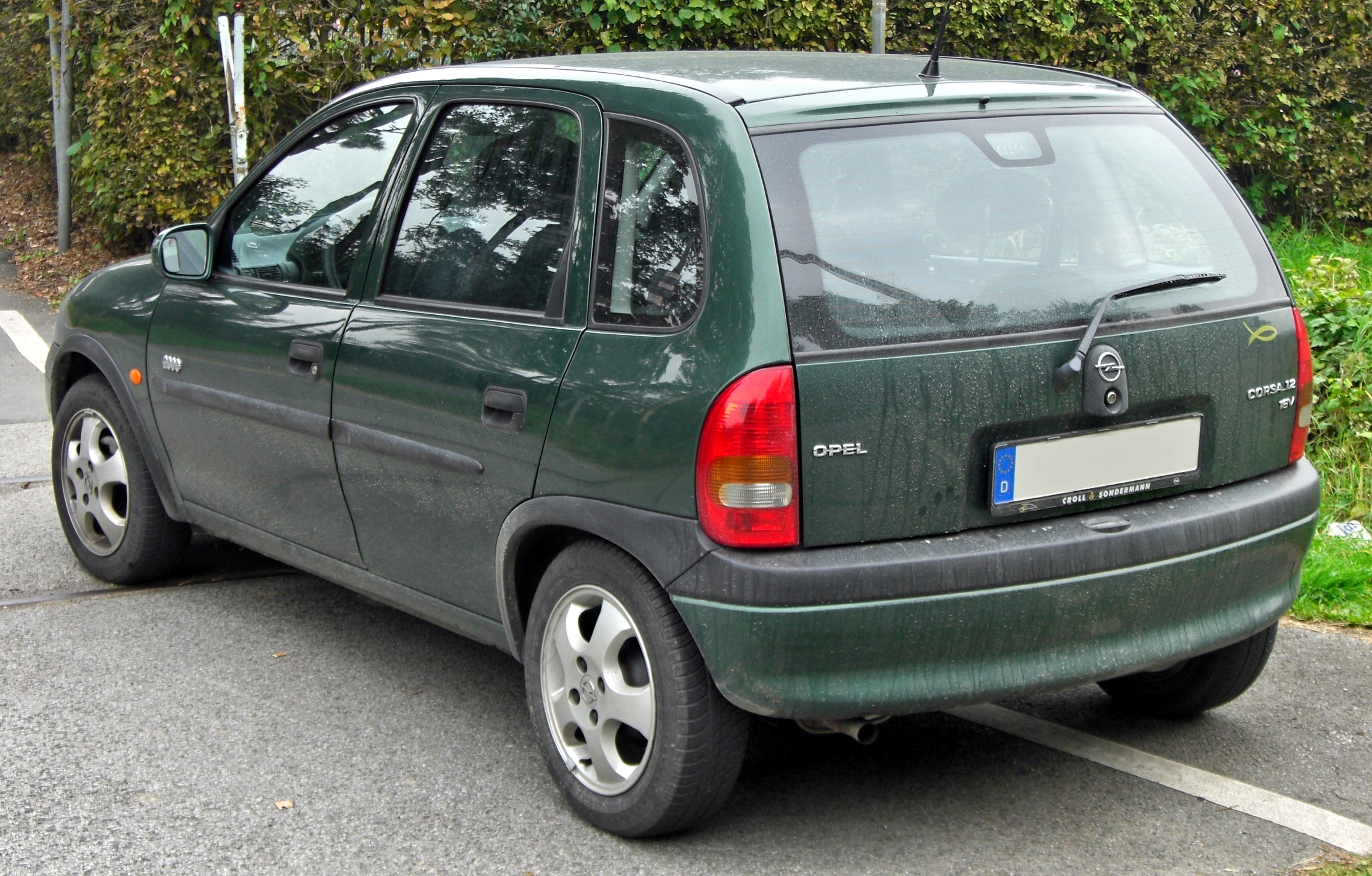
Opel Corsa five-door (1997–2000)

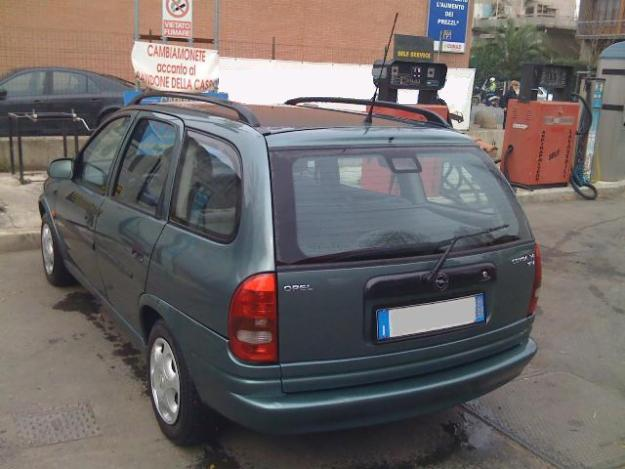
Opel Corsa Caravan

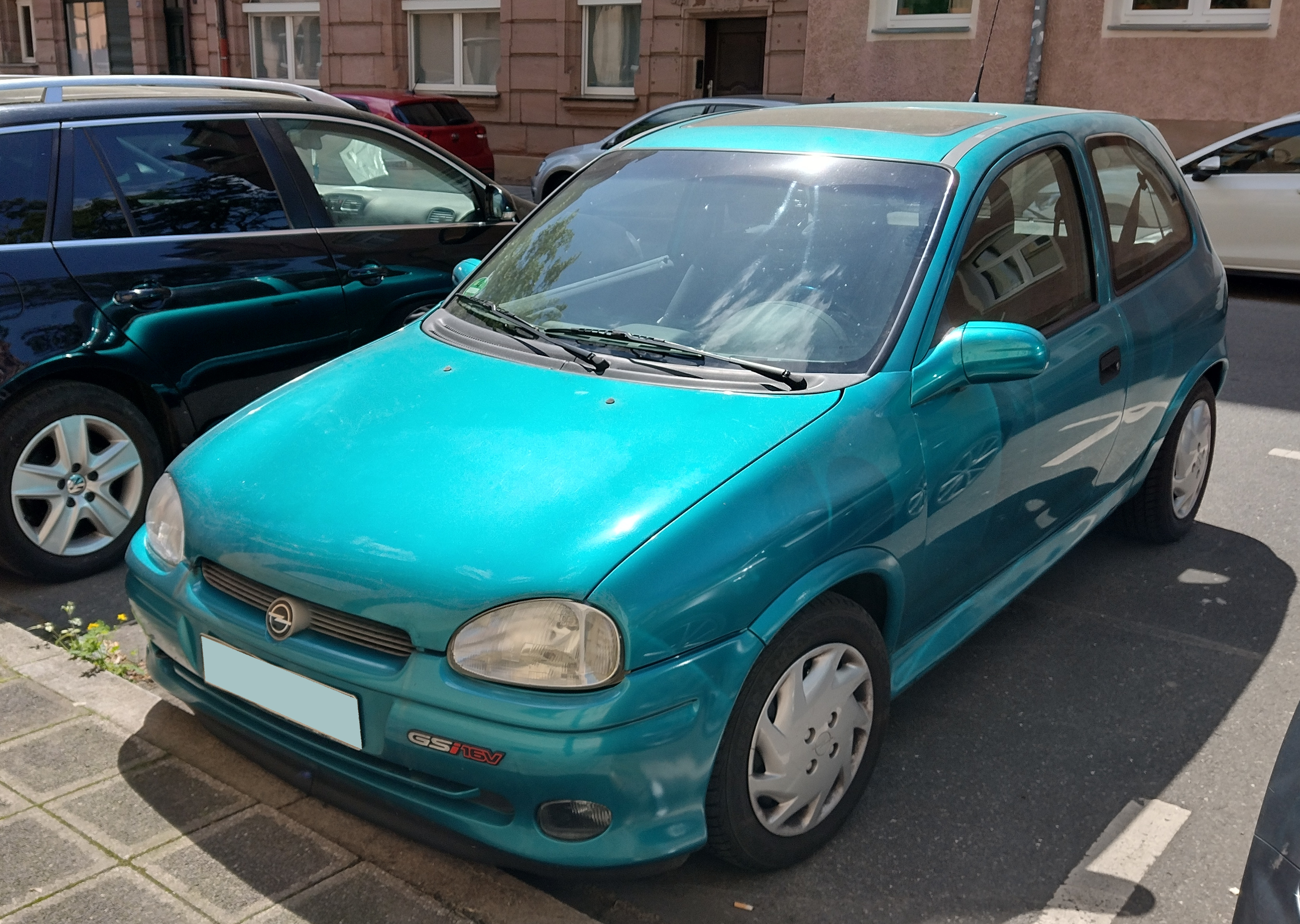
Opel Corsa GSi 16V (1993–1995)

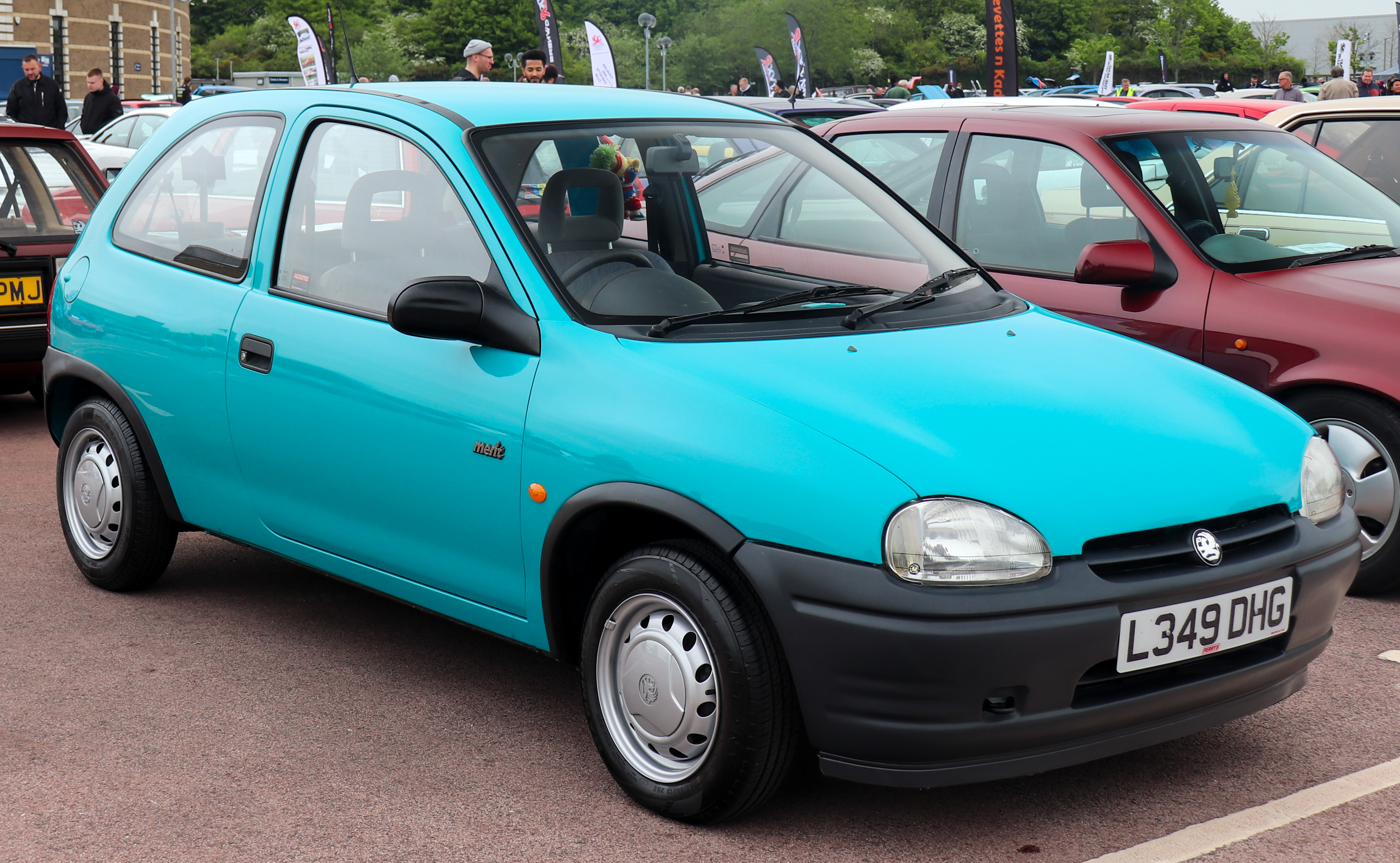
Vauxhall Corsa three-door (pre-facelift)

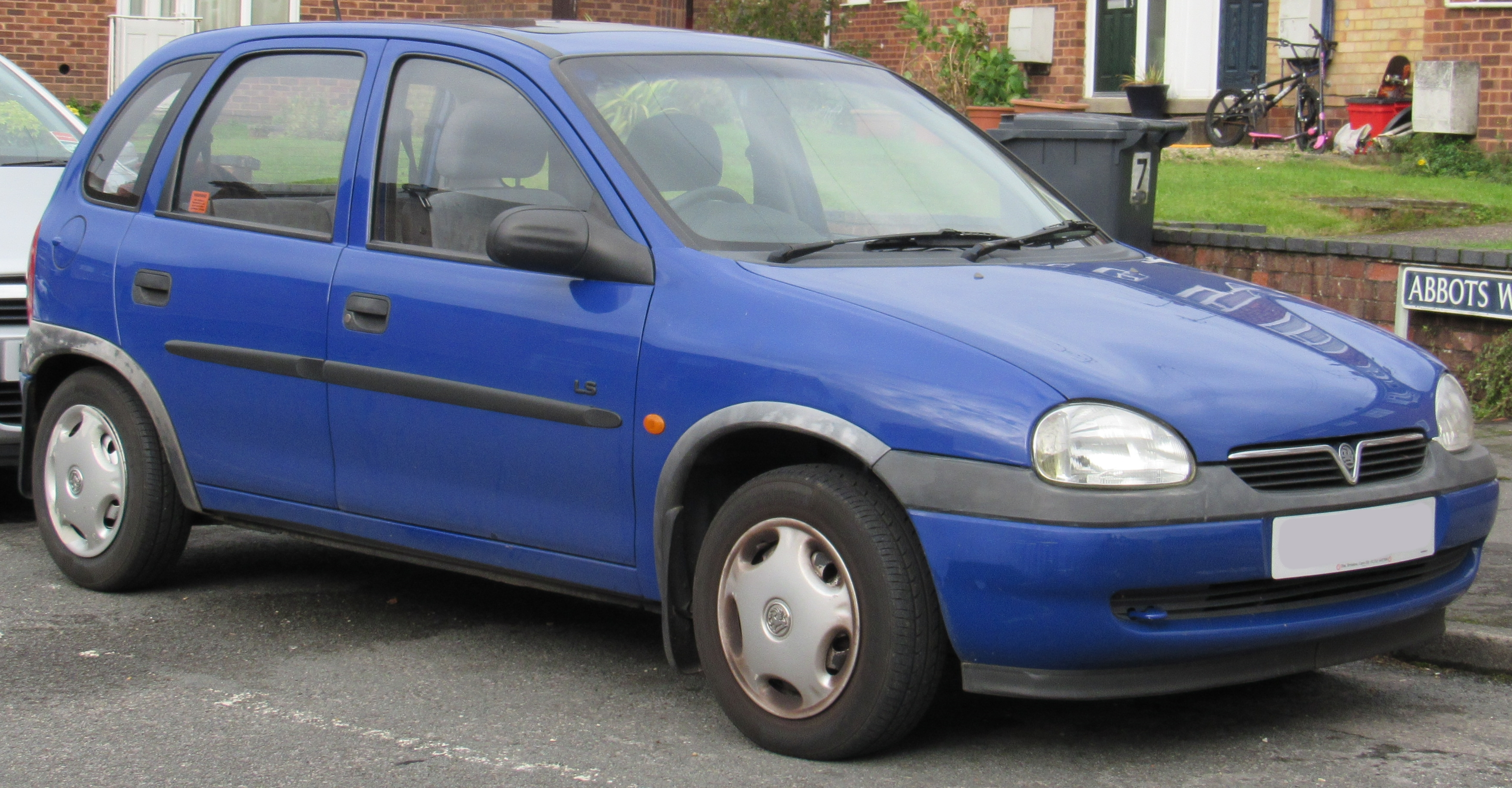
Vauxhall Corsa five-door (facelift)

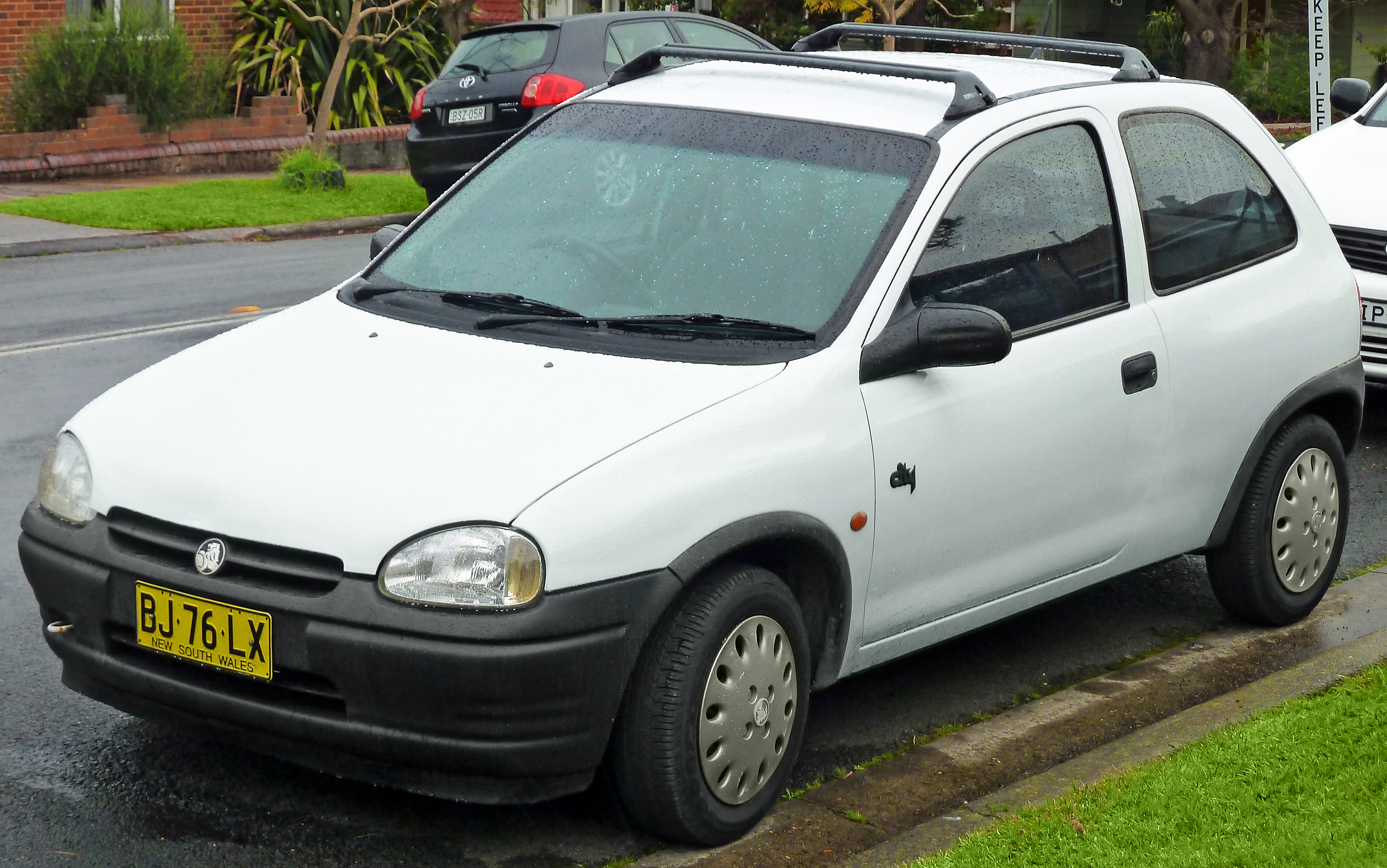
Holden Barina three-door (pre-facelift)

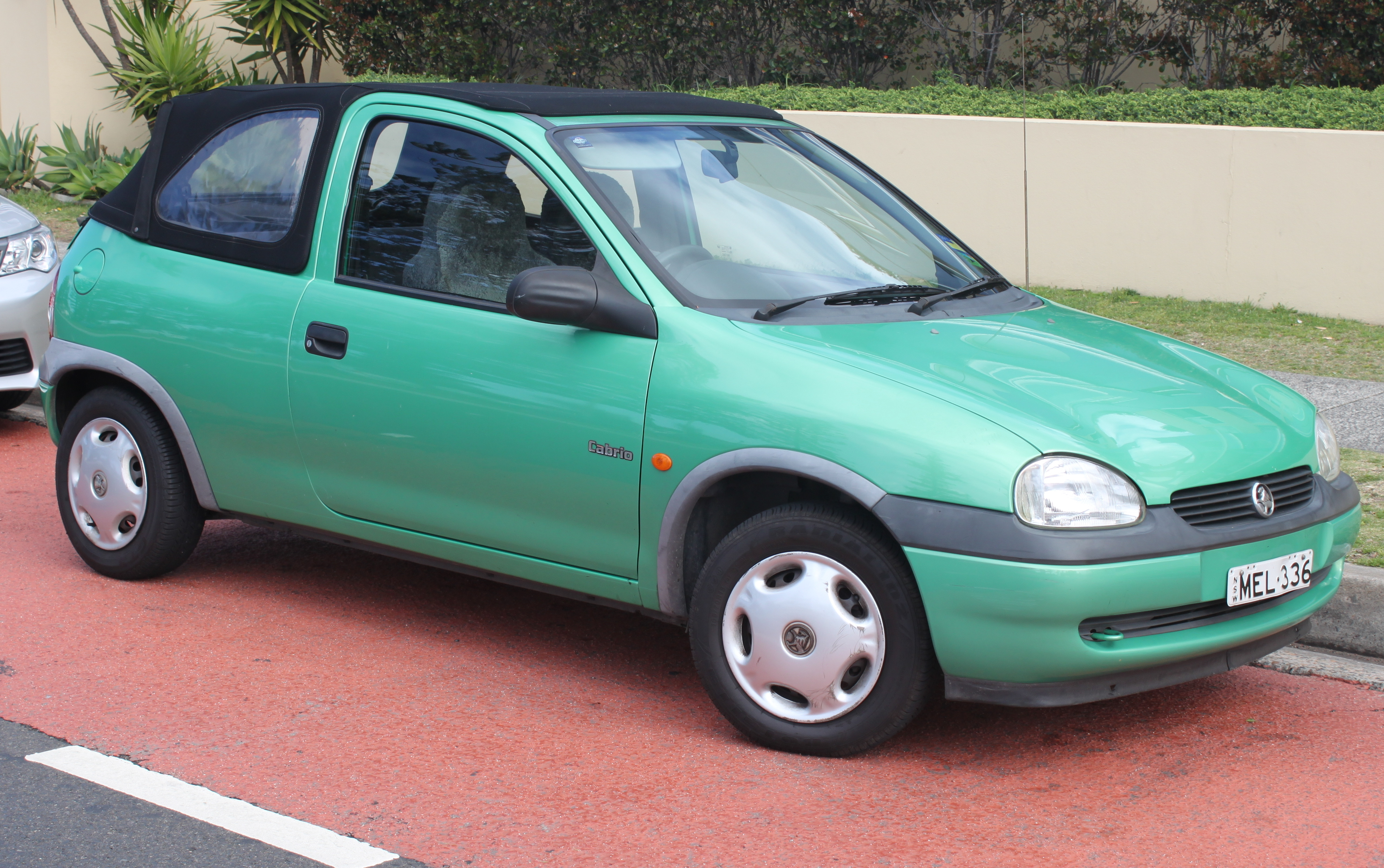
Holden Barina cabrio (facelift)

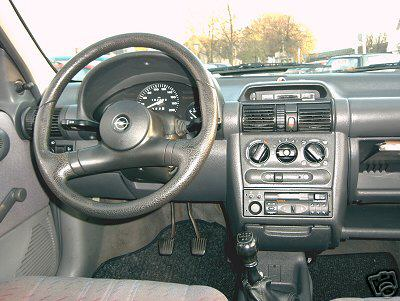
Interior

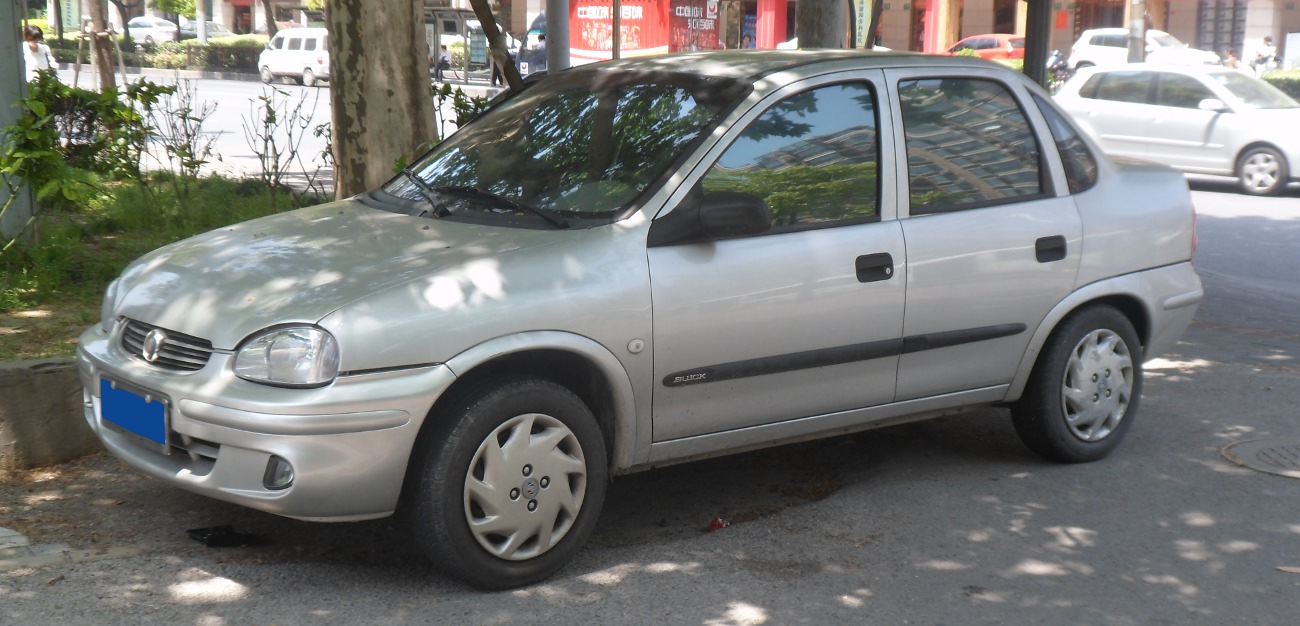
Buick Sail saloon (China)

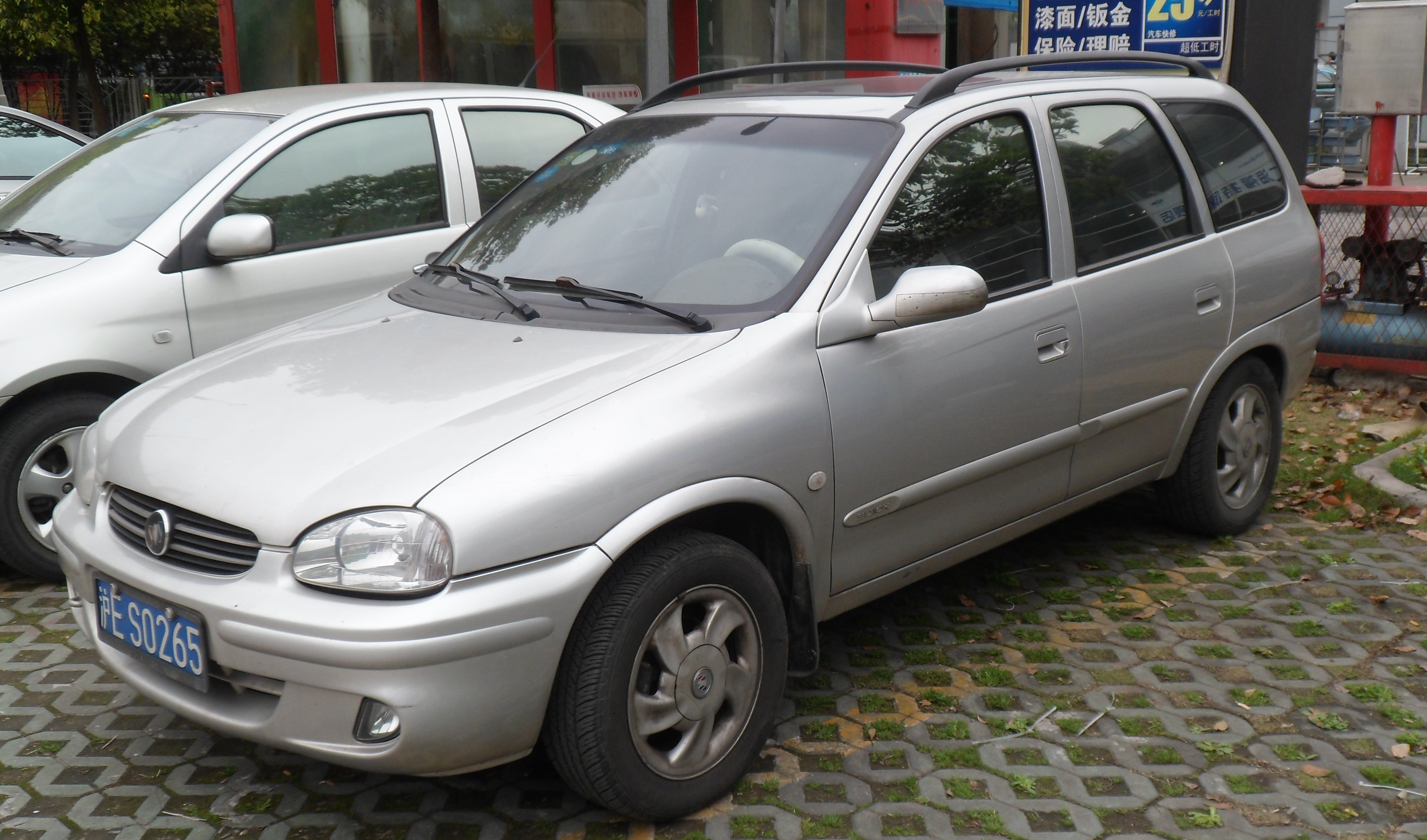
Buick Sail SRV (China)

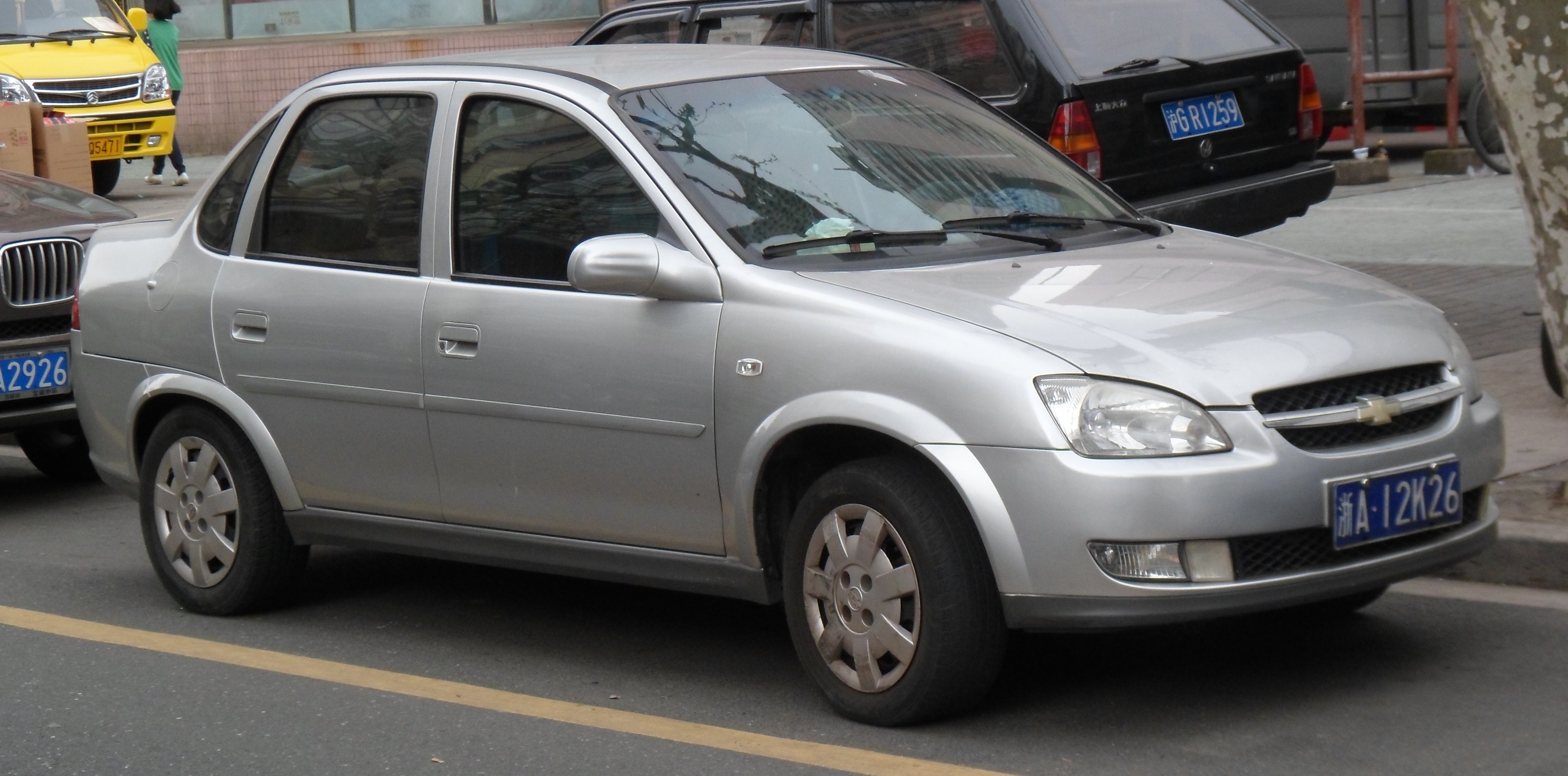
Chevrolet Sail (China)

=== Safety ===
Euro NCAP test results* RHD, three door hatchback (1997)
Test	Score	Rating
Adult occupant:	N/A	2 /5 stars
Pedestrian:	N/A	1 /4 stars

The Corsa was updated in 1997, resulting in different styling options and better safety features:

Euro NCAP test results* RHD, three door hatchback (2000)
Test	Score	Rating
Adult occupant:	18	3 /5 stars
Pedestrian:	14	2 /4 stars

The Corsa Classic in its most basic Latin American market configuration with no airbags received 1 star for adult occupants and 1 star for toddlers from Latin NCAP 1.0 in 2011. In October 2000, GM do Brasil recalled 1.3 million Corsas built between 1994 and 1999, and the front seat belt fasteners could come undone in a collision - two people were known to have died as a result.

Latin NCAP 1.0 test results Chevrolet Corsa Classic - NO Airbags (2011, based on Euro NCAP 1997)
Test	Points	Stars
Adult occupant:	2.28/17.0	1 /5 stars
Child occupant:	9.16/49.00	1 /5 stars

=== South Africa ===
The Corsa B was manufactured in South Africa and first entered the market in November 1996, featuring three models (Lite, 130i and 130iS), all having the same 1.3 L (13NE) 8 valve engine producing 58 kW (79 PS). In 1999 the range was updated, dropping the 1.3 L engine in favor of a 1.4 (14NE) producing 65 kW (88 PS) and a 1.6 (C16SE) producing 75 kW (102 PS), both still being 8-valve engines. From model year 2001, a facelift was performed, resulting in some front and rear styling changes, including a new front bumper, bonnet and clear headlight lenses and new taillight lenses featuring a "bubble" look. The Corsa B continued in production post 2002, when the Corsa C was introduced, with only the 1.4-litre engine remaining available in various "Lite" trim models (three-door only) until production ultimately ceased in 2007. Alongside the three-door hatchback, four-door saloon and pickup derivatives were also available earlier on.

Specifications differed compared to European Corsa B models, with the following features offered in Europe and UK never being offered on South African models:

- 16 valve engines (all models used the older SOHC 8 valve engine design)
- ABS brakes
- Airbags
- Electric windows and mirrors were never offered on any three-door models and only on the top spec (160iE) four-door saloon
- No automatic transmission option was ever offered

Corsa B Engines used in South African models
Models	Engine used
Lite, 130i, 130iS, 130iE	1.3 L (13NE) 58 kW (79 PS)
Lite, Lite+, Lite Sport, Chill, 1.4i, 1.4iS	1.4 L (14NE) 65 kW (88 PS)
160i, 160iS, 160iE, GSi, GSi Ltd	1.6 L (C16SE) 75 kW (102 PS)

=== Latin America ===
The saloon model was built and sold in Latin America as the Chevrolet Corsa Classic until 2010 when it was replaced with the model previously released for China in 2005 as the Buick Sail. A budget version introduced for the Brazilian market, the Chevrolet Celta, has bodywork resembling the end of the 1990s Vectra and Astra. The Celta was sold in Argentina as the Suzuki Fun for a certain period.

In 2011, General Motors stopped representing Suzuki in Argentina, so the Celta reverted to its original name under the Chevrolet brand. Argentinian production began in September 1997, where it was the first locally built Chevrolet passenger car since 1978.

The Latin American Corsa received a small facelift in 1999, with smoother bumpers, and from April 2002 (when the new Corsa II was introduced) the Corsa B began being marketed as the "Corsa Classic" until 2010, where it was renamed to simply "Classic" with the saloon and estate versions becoming their Corsa B derived Chevrolet Sail versions while the three-door hatchback version of the Corsa Classic was replaced with the Chevrolet Celta. Production finally ceased in October 2016.

==== Mexico ====
For 1995, General Motors de México first marketed the Corsa B as the Chevrolet Chevy. For 2004 (after the Corsa C had been introduced in 2002), a Mexican designed and produced version of the hatchback and saloon, known as the Chevrolet Chevy C2, was released, which was also sold in Colombia.

All Mexican previous versions were known as the Chevy, with the names Monza used on the saloon, and Swing (five-door) and Joy (three-door) for the hatchbacks, all with a 1.6-litre 78 PS (57 kW) four-cylinder. There was also a low-end three-door model called the Chevrolet Chevy Popular, which was equipped with a 52 PS (38 kW) 1.4-litre engine. The latter 2004 and 2008 redesigns were simply named Chevy and Chevy Sedán. The Chevy was a favourite among taxicab drivers and one of the best selling cars in the country.

The Chevy ended production at the end of August 2011, at the Ramos Arizpe assembly plant. This move was because the Chevy's sales had been dropping constantly since the beginning of 2010, and also because it didn't meet the new safety requirement rules in Mexico that forced it to have standard front airbags.

The five-door hatchback was dropped after the 2010 model year, leaving only the four-door saloon and the three-door hatchback, this three-door hatch being the most popular model. The Chevy was discontinued only a short run of 2012 models, after almost 18 years on the Mexican market.

The successor for the three-door and saloon, the Chevrolet Sonic was also built in Ramos Arizpe starting 2012, while GM subsequently replaced the five-door Chevy with the Chevrolet Spark.

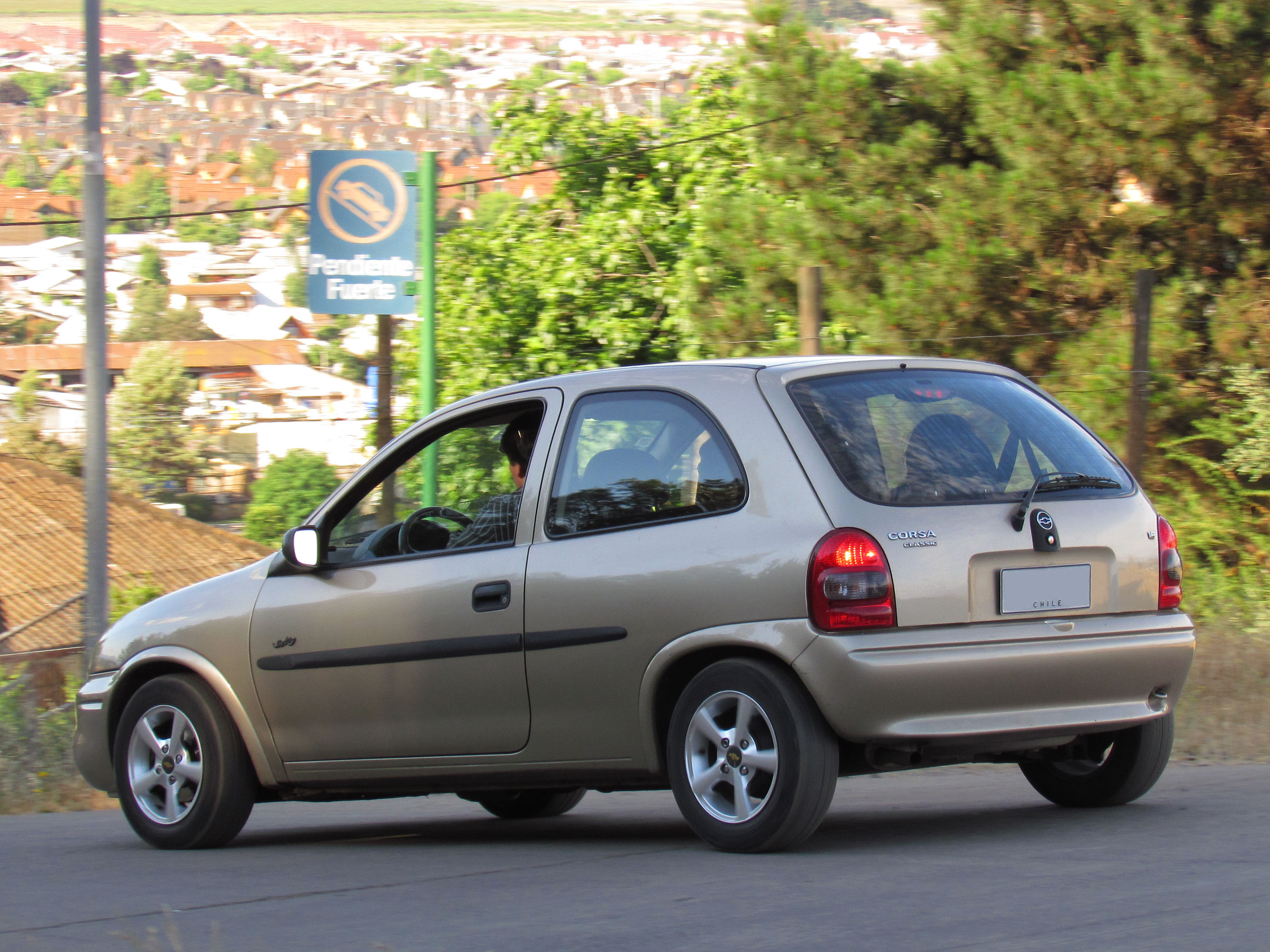
Chevy Joy

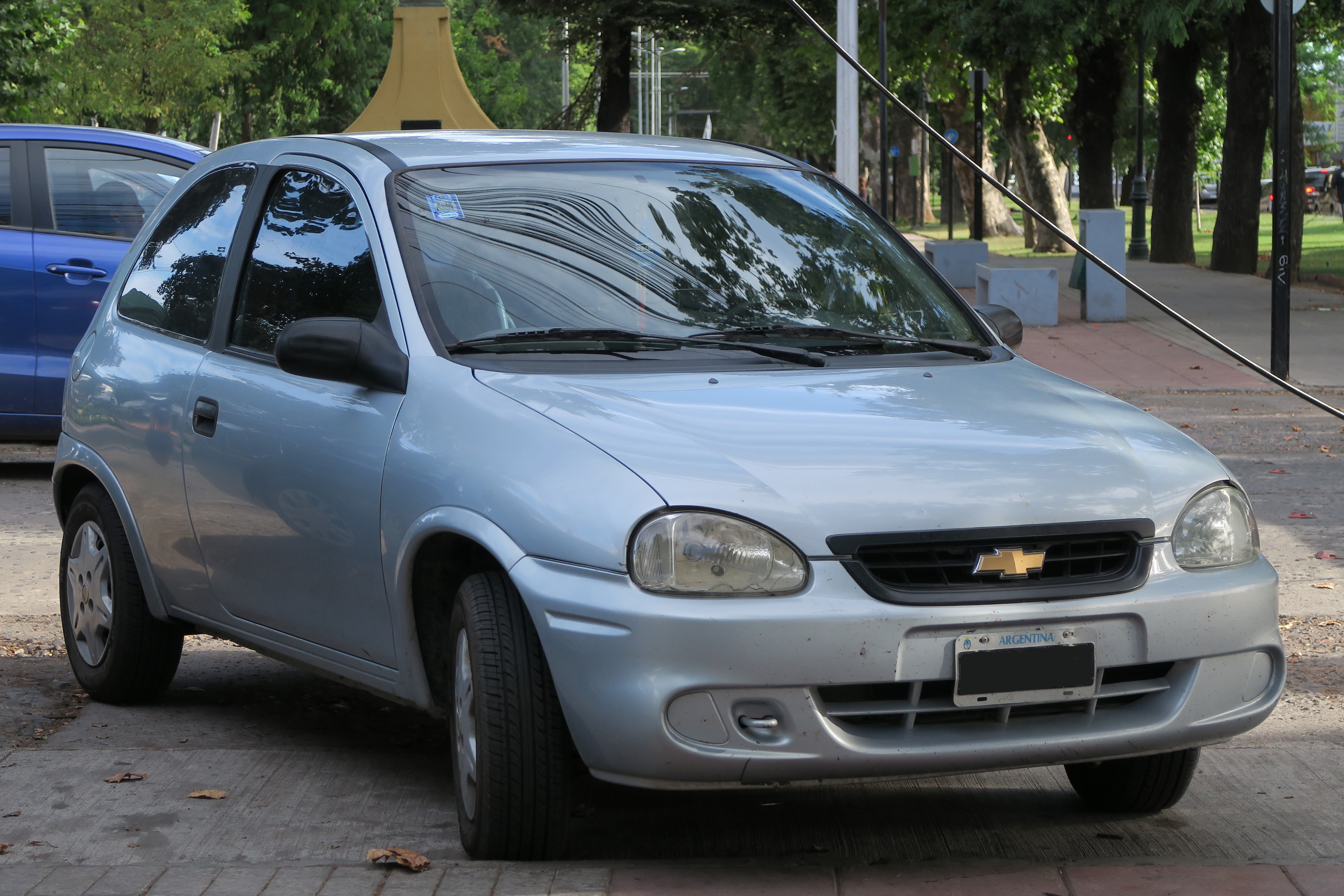
Chevy Classic Joy

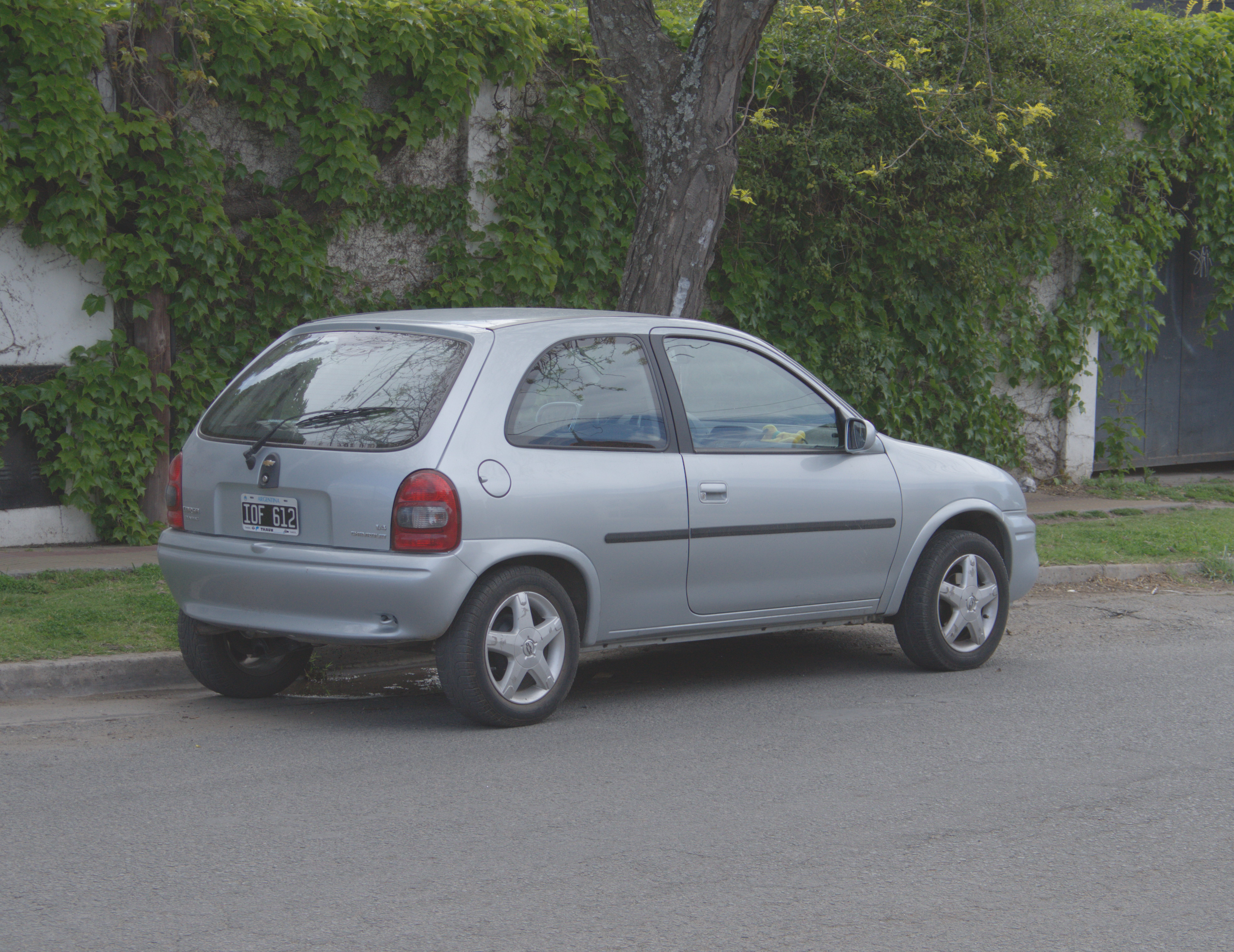
Chevy Classic Joy

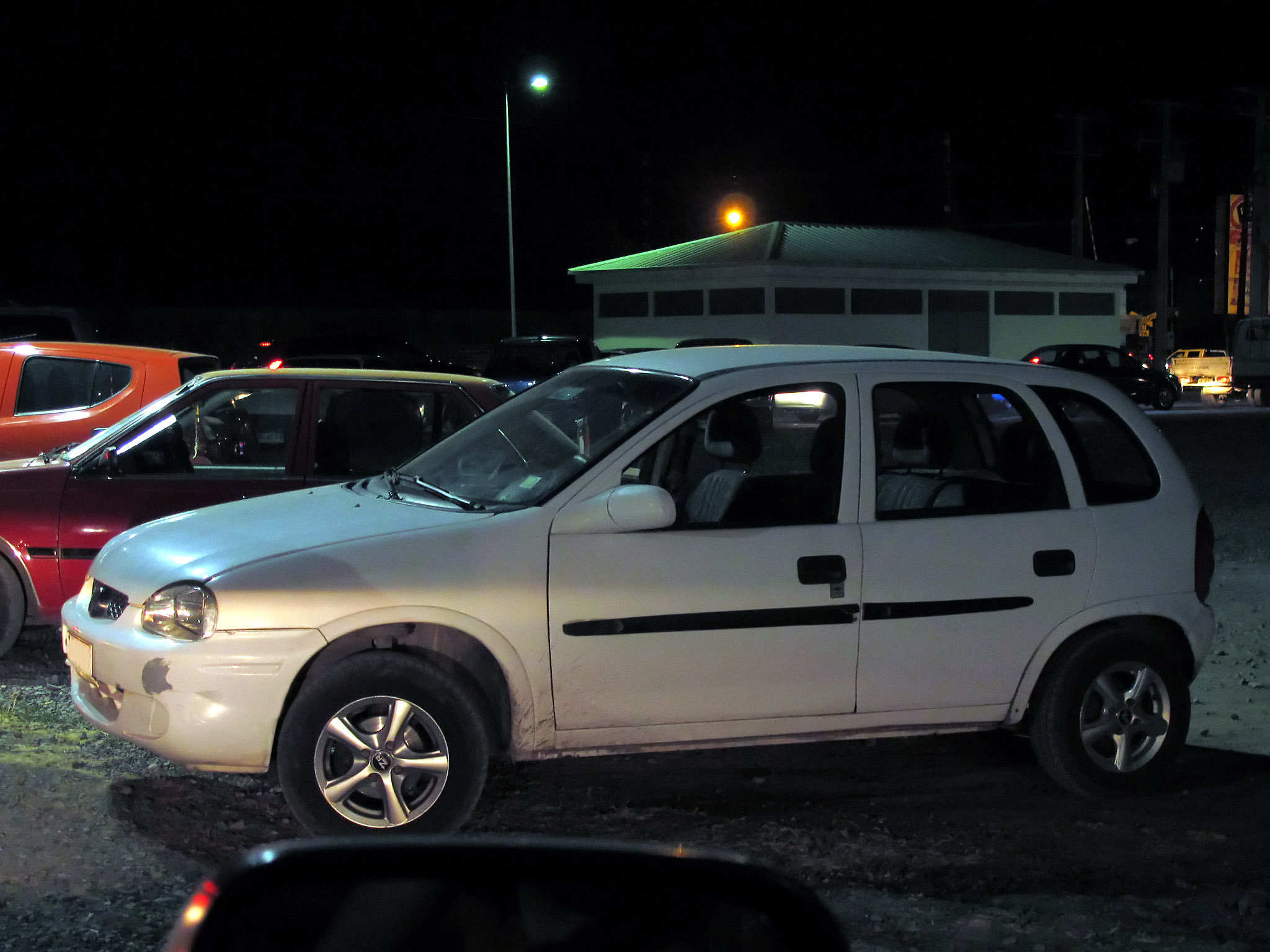
Chevy Swing

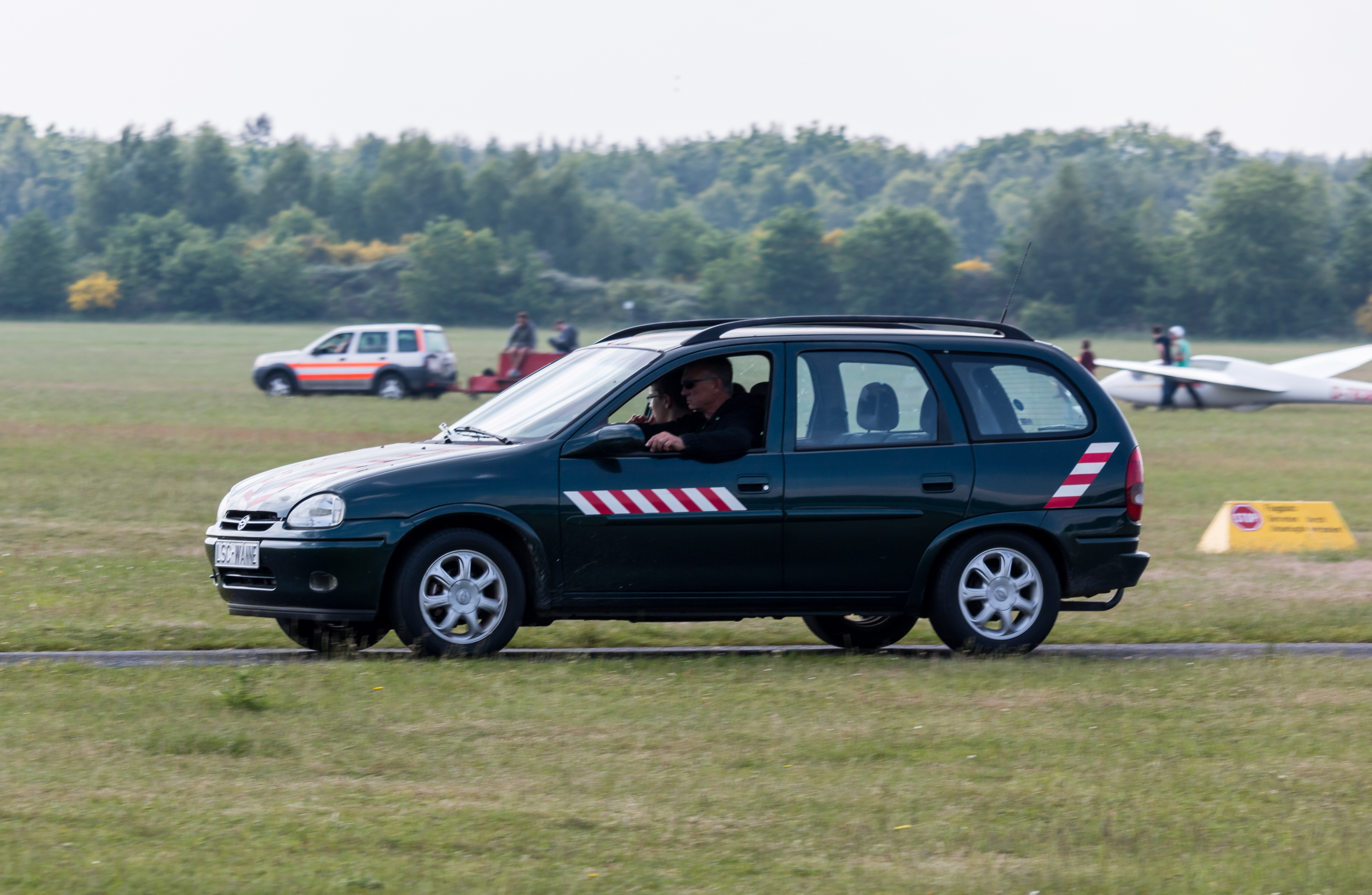
Chevy Swing Caravan

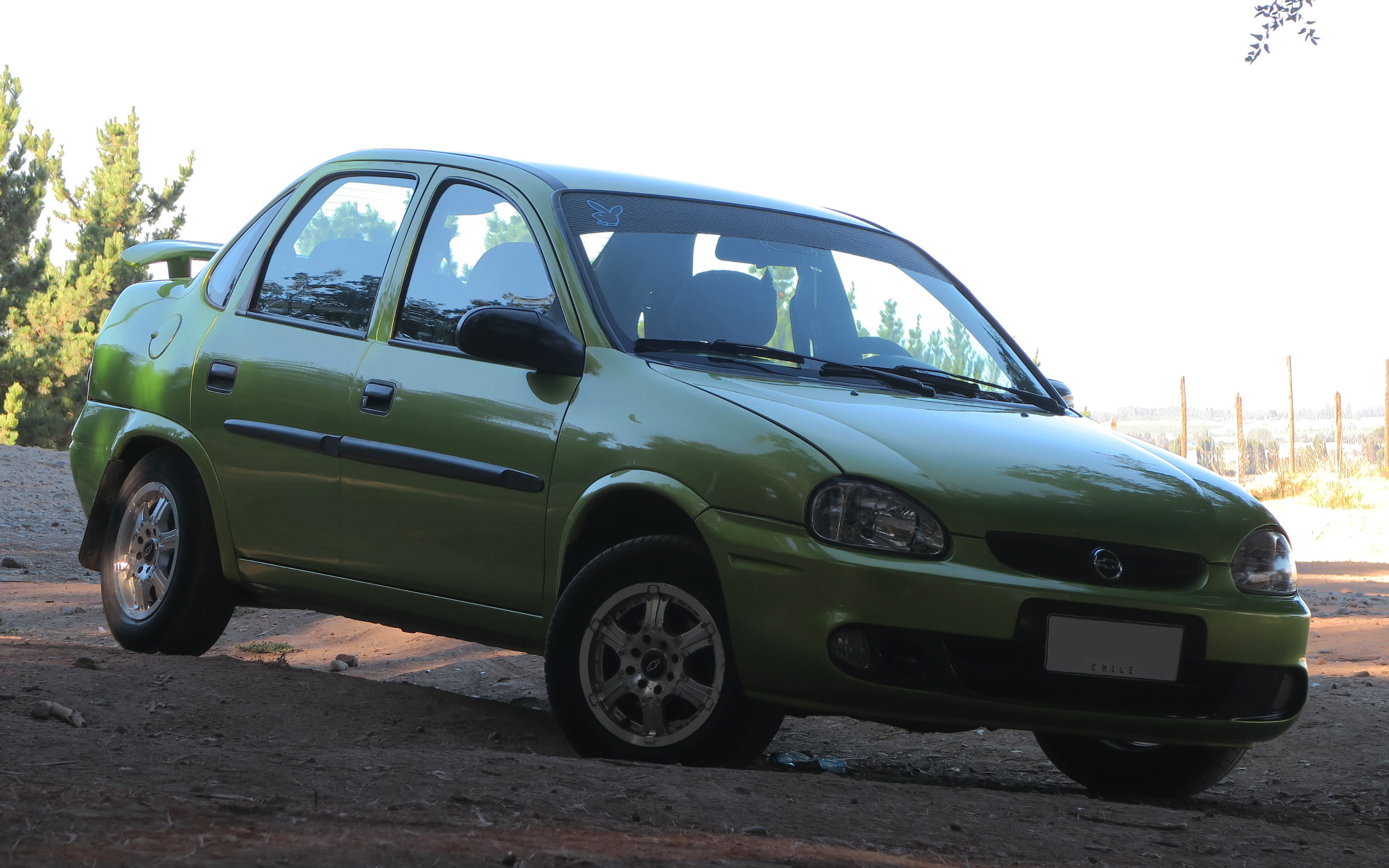
Chevy Classic Sedan

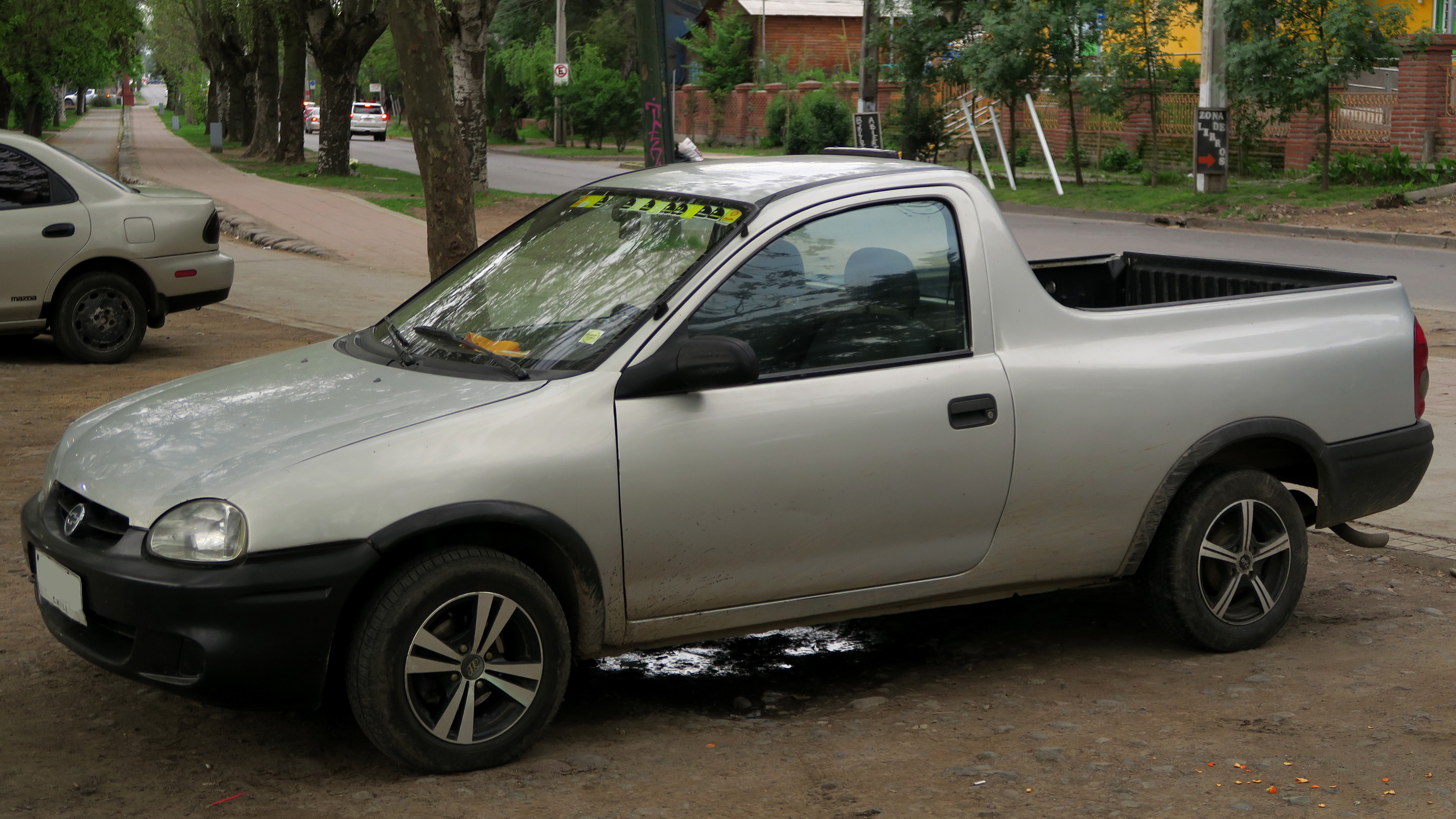
Chevrolet Chevy Pick-up

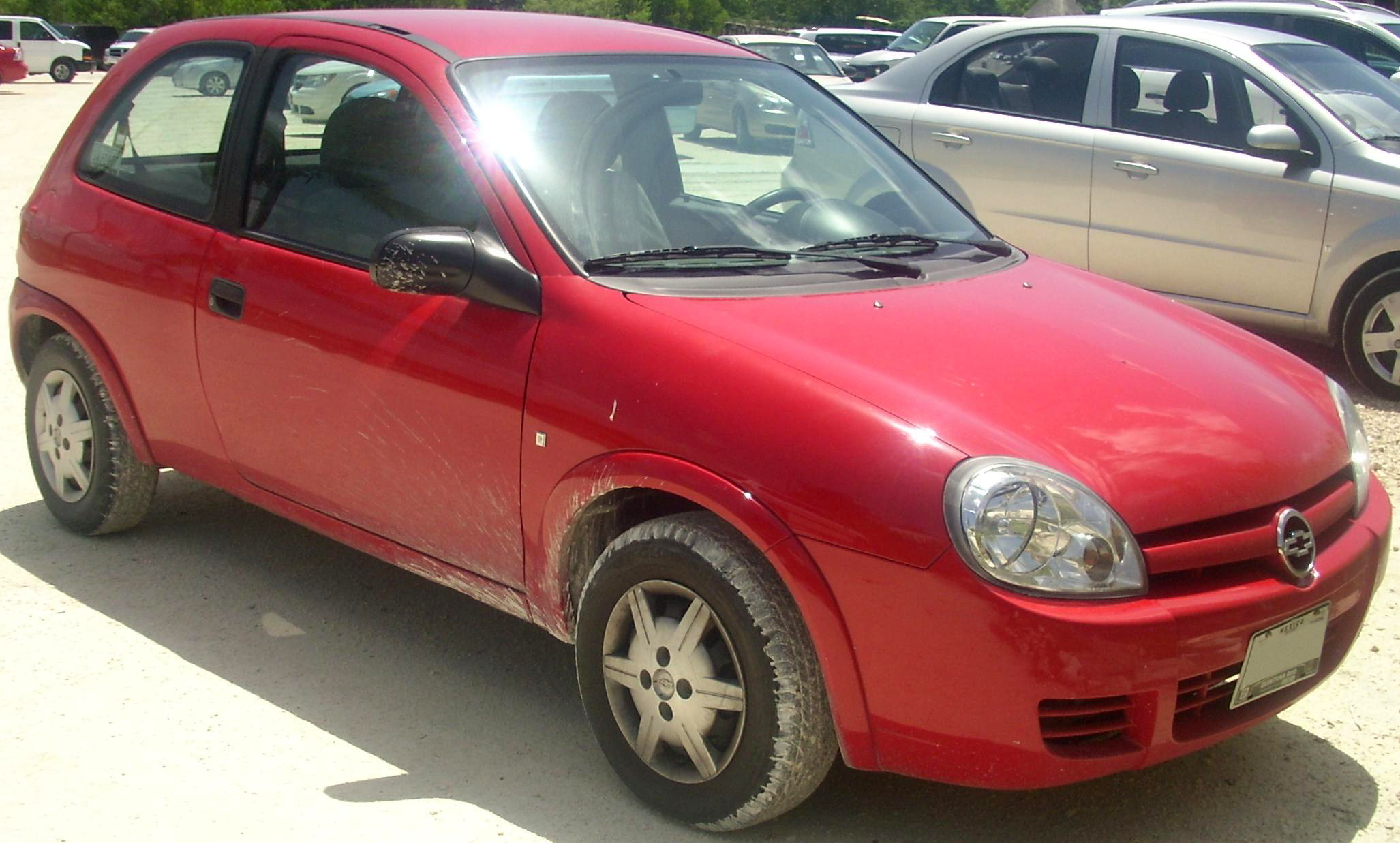
Chevrolet Chevy C2 Joy

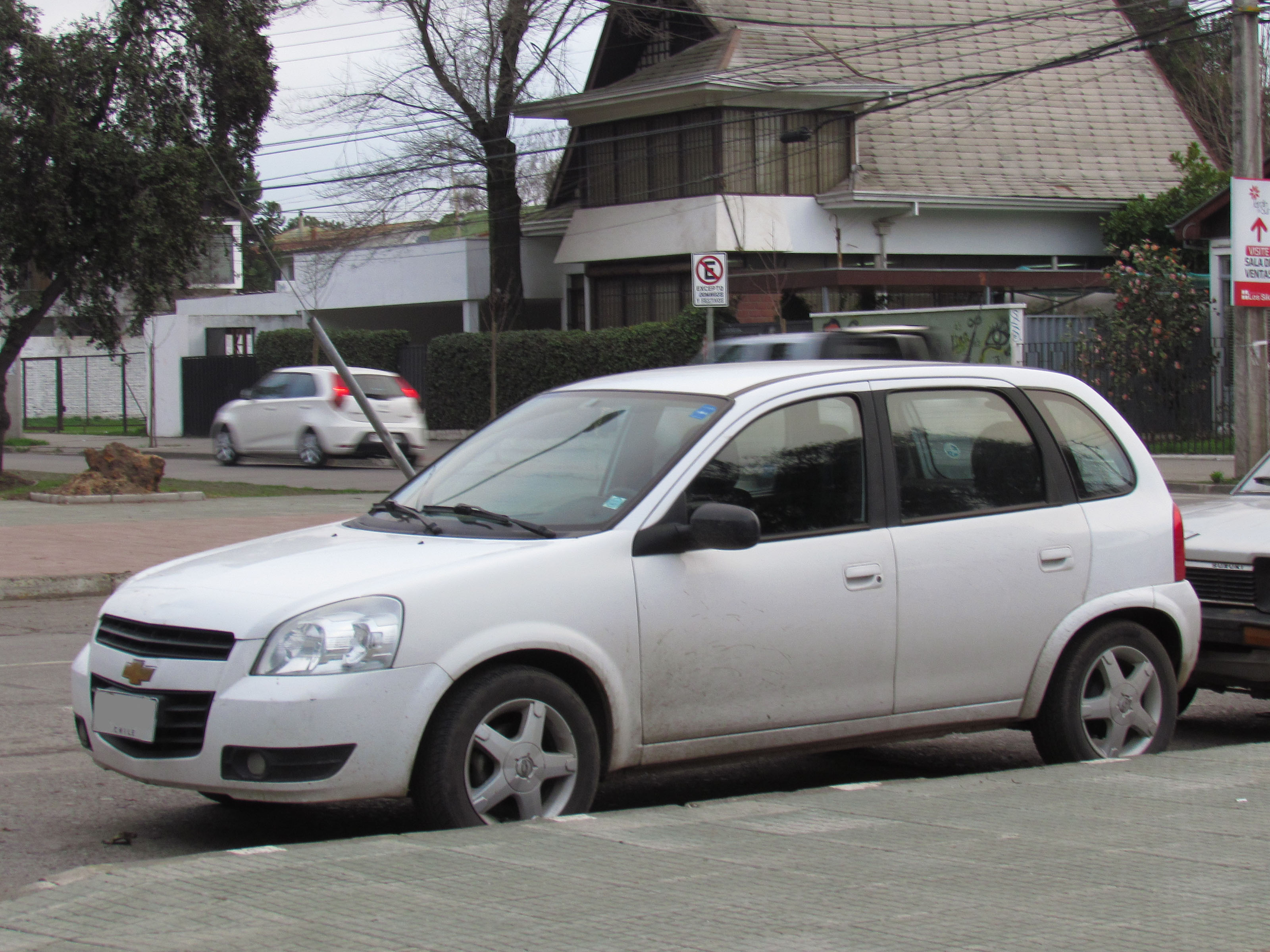
Chevy C2 Joy (2008 facelift)

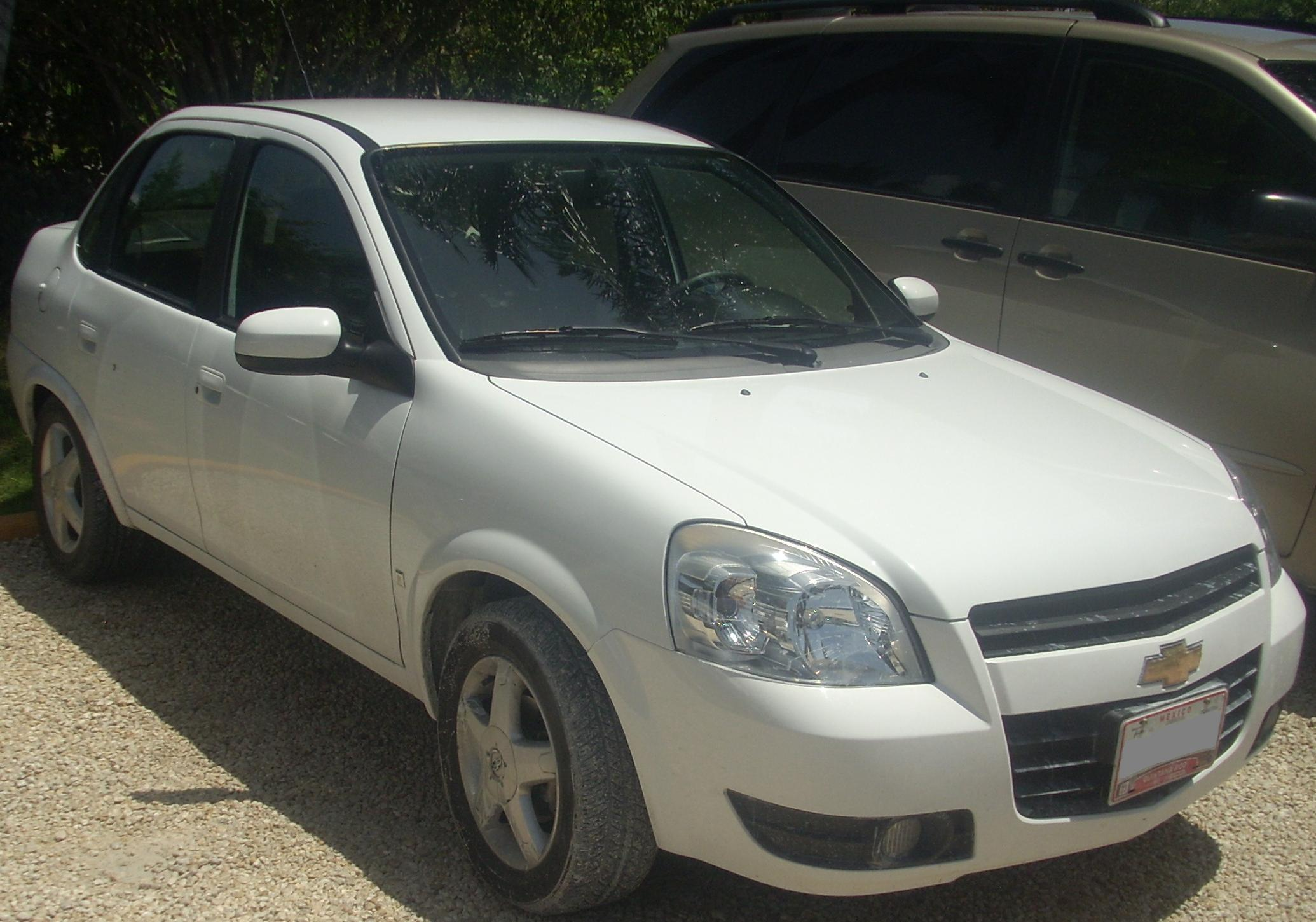
Chevrolet Chevy Sedán (2008 facelift)

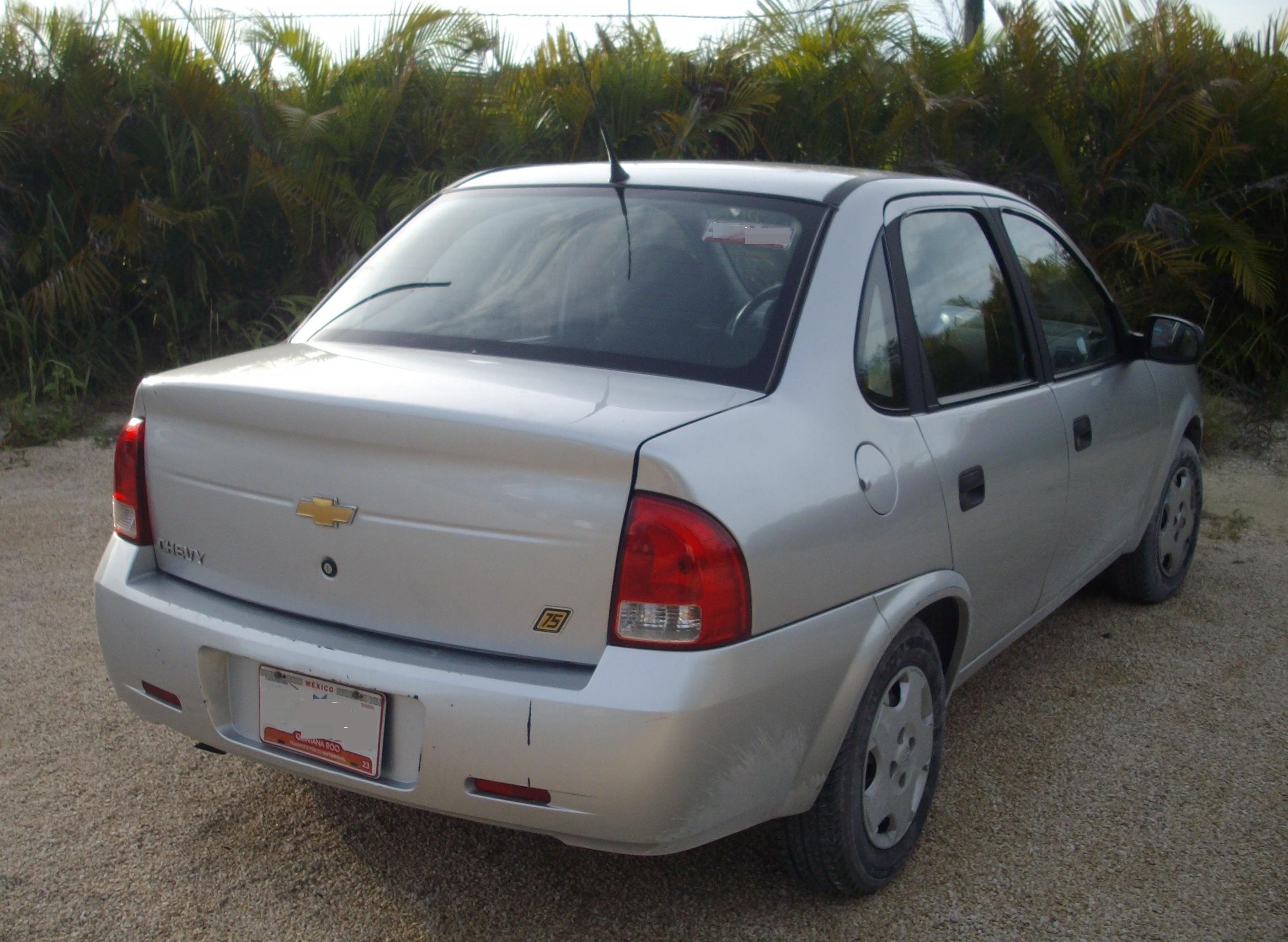
Chevrolet Chevy Sedán
- Opel Corsa – Europe (except the United Kingdom)
- Vauxhall Corsa – United Kingdom
- Buick Sail – China, June 2001 until February 2005
- Chevrolet Corsa – Latin America (also known as Opel Corsa in Chile)
- Chevrolet Corsa Classic – South America, after the release of the Corsa C
- Chevrolet Classic – Brazil, since 2005; Argentina, since 2010
- Holden Barina – Australia and New Zealand (was replaced by the Daewoo Kalos from 2005)
- Opel Corsa Lite and Opel Corsa Classic – South Africa, for the hatchback and saloon versions respectively
- Opel Corsa Sail and Opel Corsa Swing – India, for the hatchback and the estate car version respectively
- Opel Vita – Japan (Toyota already registered the Corsa name for one of their domestic models, the Toyota Tercel)
- Chevrolet Chevy – Mexico, for the 2004 Corsa derived Chevy C2, facelifted at the end of 2008 for 2009. It was discontinued in the first quarter of 2012.

Derived versions

- Chevrolet Sail – China, since 2005. A new version was released in 2010 then another in 2014.
- Chevrolet Classic – Argentina and Brazil, since 2011, for the Chevrolet Sail
- Chevrolet Corsa Plus – Chile, for the Chinese built Chevrolet Sail
- Chevrolet Celta and Chevrolet Prisma – South America, for the hatchback and saloon version respectively
- Chevrolet Monza for the four-door saloon edition of the Chevrolet Chevy. Discontinued in spring 2012.
- Suzuki Fun – Argentina, for the Corsa derived Chevrolet Celta. Discontinued in 2011. Name switched to Chevrolet Celta.

== Corsa C (X01; 2000) ==
Corsa C
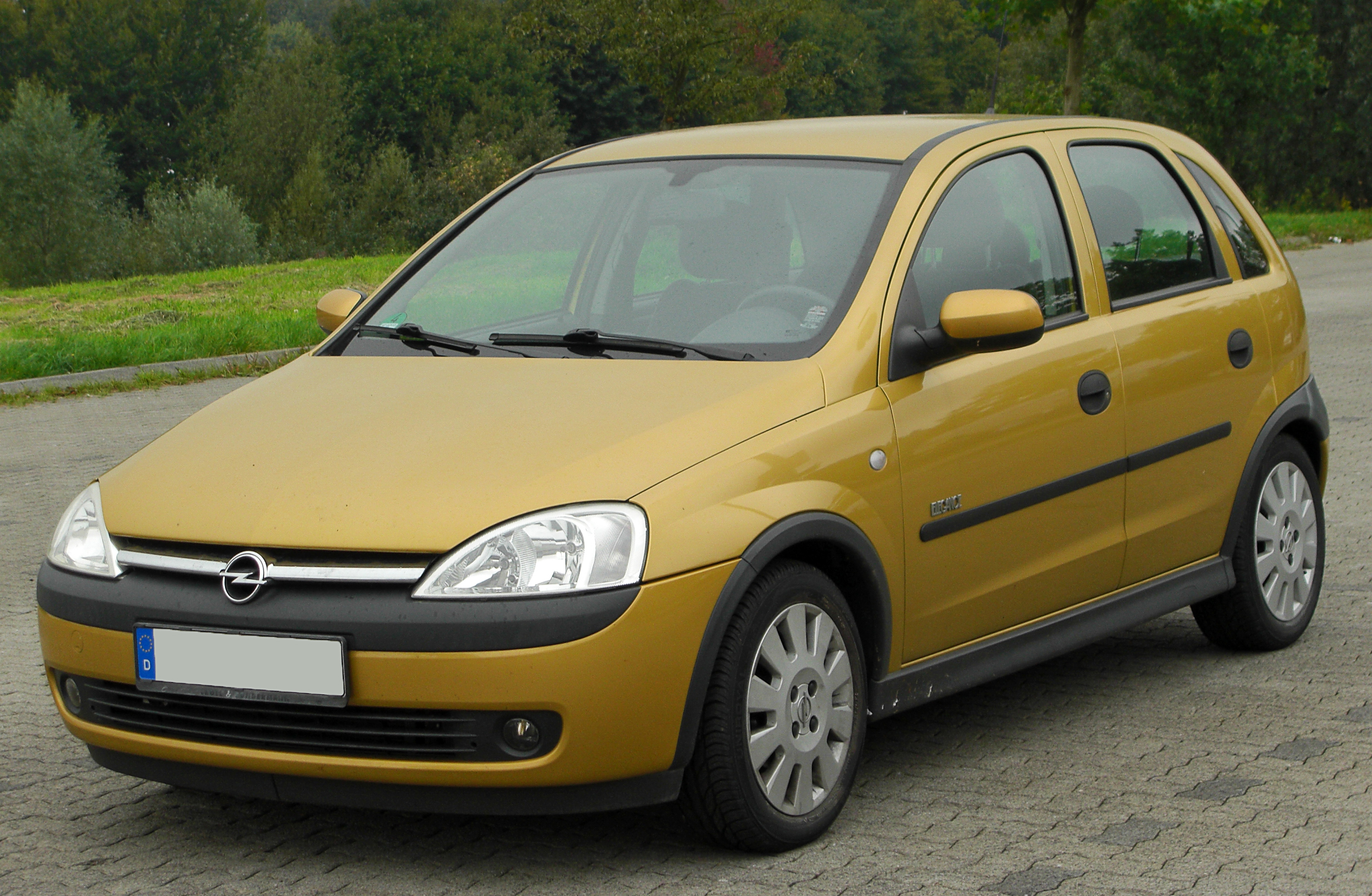

Overview
- Model code: X01
- Also called: Chevrolet Corsa; Holden Barina; Opel Vita (Japan); Vauxhall Corsa
- Production: 2000–2007 (Europe); 2002–2012 (South America)
- Assembly: Germany: Eisenach; Spain: Zaragoza; Brazil: São José dos Campos (GM Brazil); South Africa: Port Elizabeth (GM South Africa); Egypt: 6 October City (GM Egypt); Argentina: Alvear (GM Argentina); Ecuador: Quito (AYMESA)

Body and chassis
- Body style: 3/5-door hatchback; 4-door saloon; 3-door van; 2-door coupé utility (pick-up)
- Platform: Gamma platform
- Related: Opel Combo C Opel Meriva A Opel Tigra TwinTop B

Powertrain
- Engine: Petrol: 1.0 L X10XE I3; 1.0 L Z10XEP I3; 1.2 L Z12XE I4; 1.2 L Z12XEP I4; 1.4 L X14XE I4; 1.4 L Z14XE I4; 1.4 L Z14XEP I4; 1.6 L Z16SE I4; 1.8 L Z18XE I4; Diesel: 1.25 L Fiat CDTI I4 (turbo); 1.7 L Isuzu DI I4 (turbo); 1.7 L Isuzu DTI I4 (turbo); 1.7 L Isuzu CDTI I4 (turbo)
- Transmission: 5-speed manual 4-speed Aisin AF13 automatic 5-speed ZF Easytronic automated manual

Dimensions
- Wheelbase: 2,491 mm (98.1 in)
- Length: 3,817 mm (150.3 in) (hatchback); 4,181 mm (164.6 in) (saloon)
- Width: 1,645 mm (64.8 in)
- Height: 1,440 mm (56.7 in); 1,430 mm (56.3 in) (saloon)

Chronology
- Successor: Chevrolet Agile (South America)

The Corsa C was revealed in 1999, and introduced to the European market in October 2000, and the facelift arrived in February 2004. General Motors dubbed the new chassis Gamma, and intended to use it for a number of other models. A saloon version was also offered in Latin America, South Africa and the Middle East. In 2002, the Corsa chassis spawned a mini MPV called the Opel Meriva, development of which began under Opel in Rüsselsheim. In Japan, where the car was sold through the Yanase dealership chain as the Opel Vita, it was discontinued in April 2004 due to sluggish sales.

The vehicle won 2001 Semperit Irish Car of the Year in Ireland.

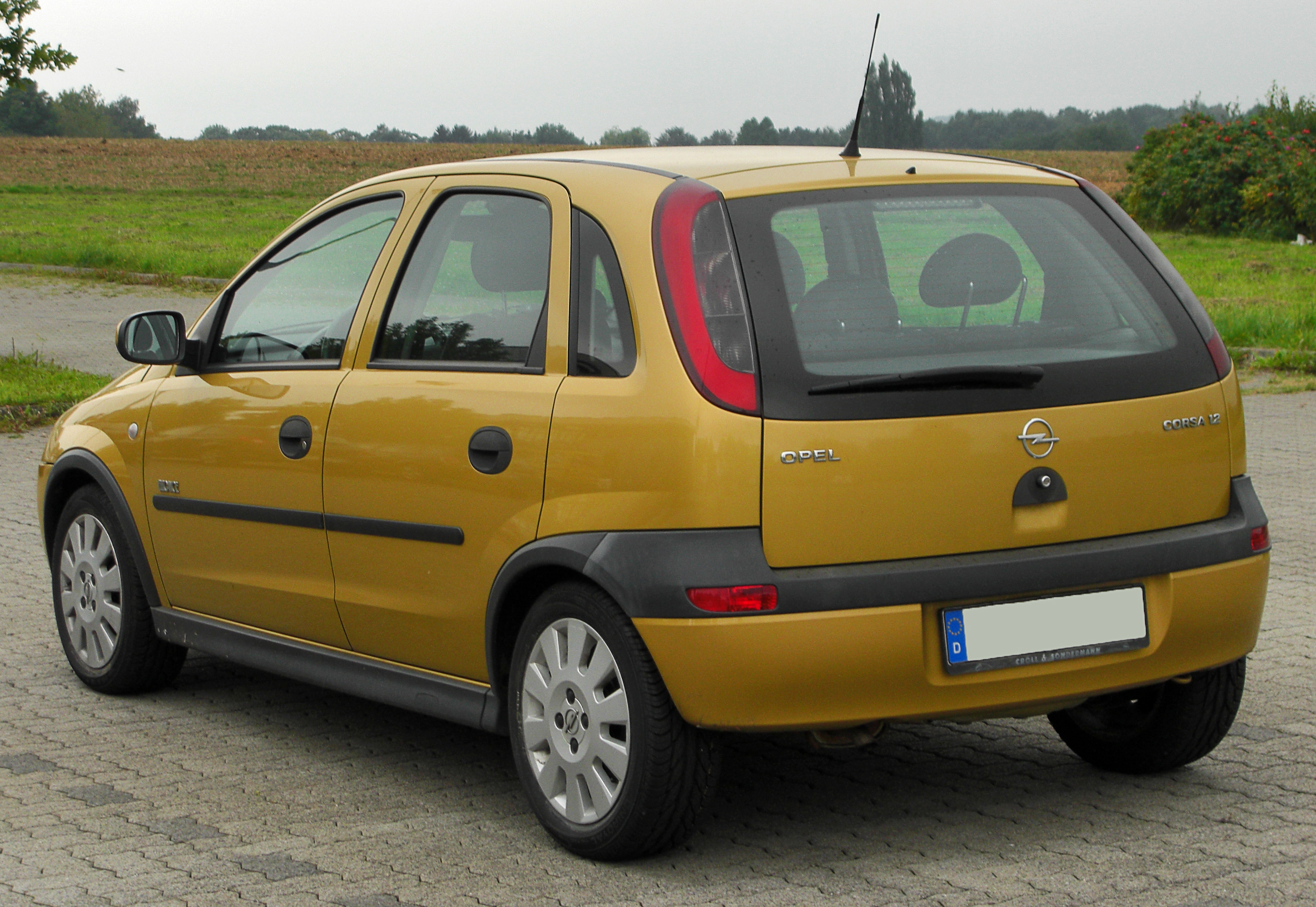
Opel Corsa five-door (2000–2004)

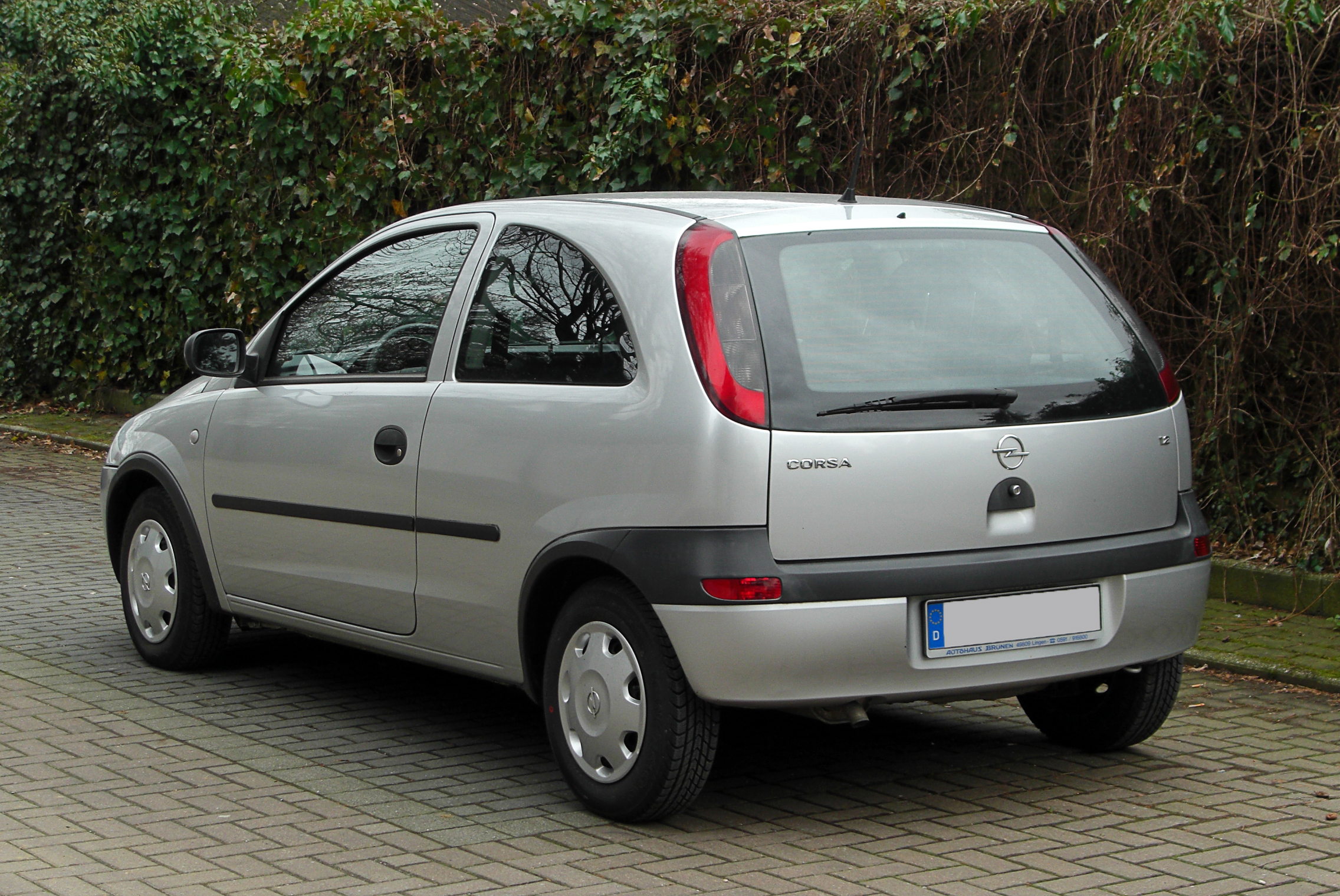
Opel Corsa three-door (2000–2004)

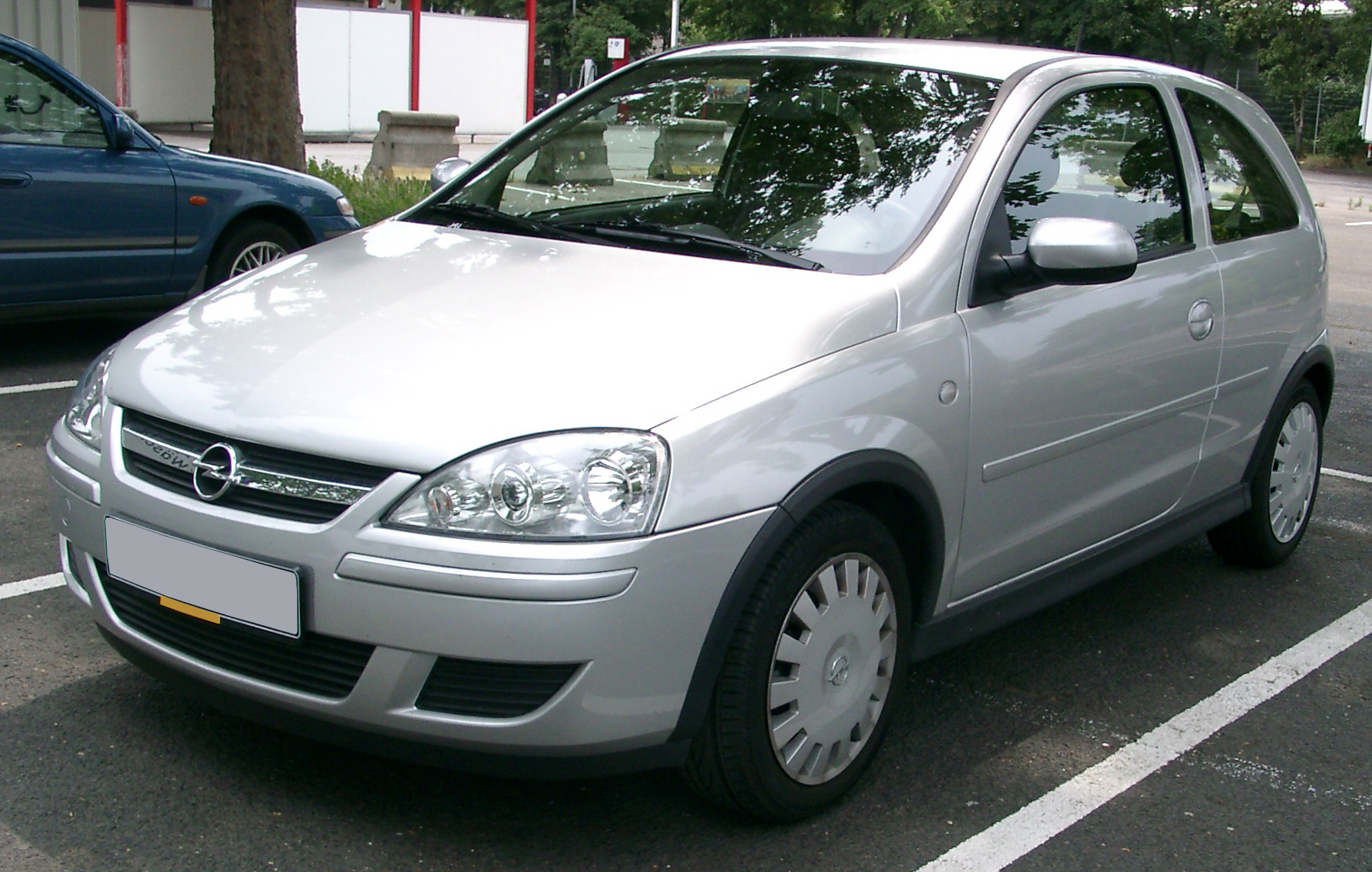
Opel Corsa three-door (2004–2007)

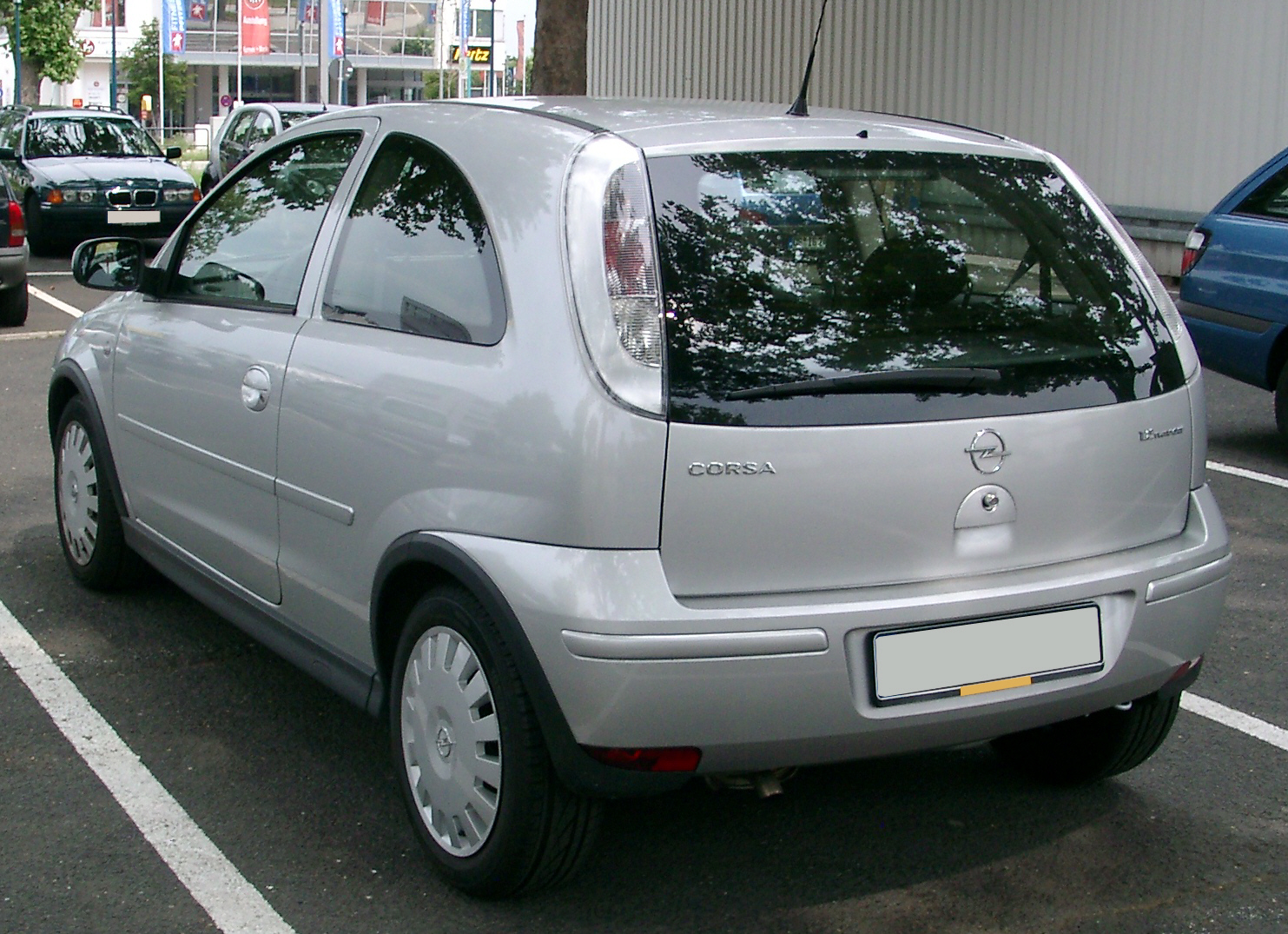
Opel Corsa three-door (2004–2007)

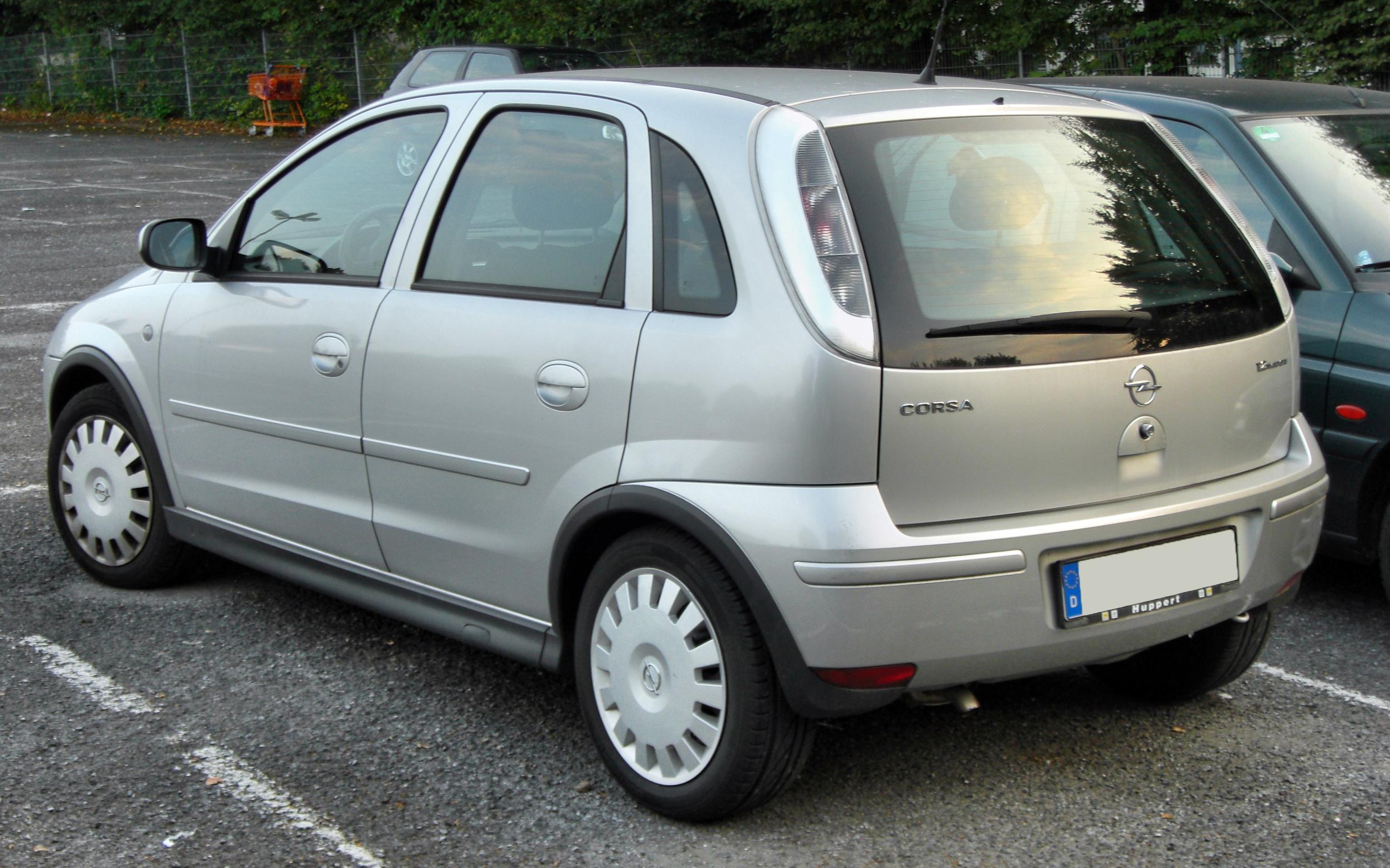
Opel Corsa five-door (2004–2007)

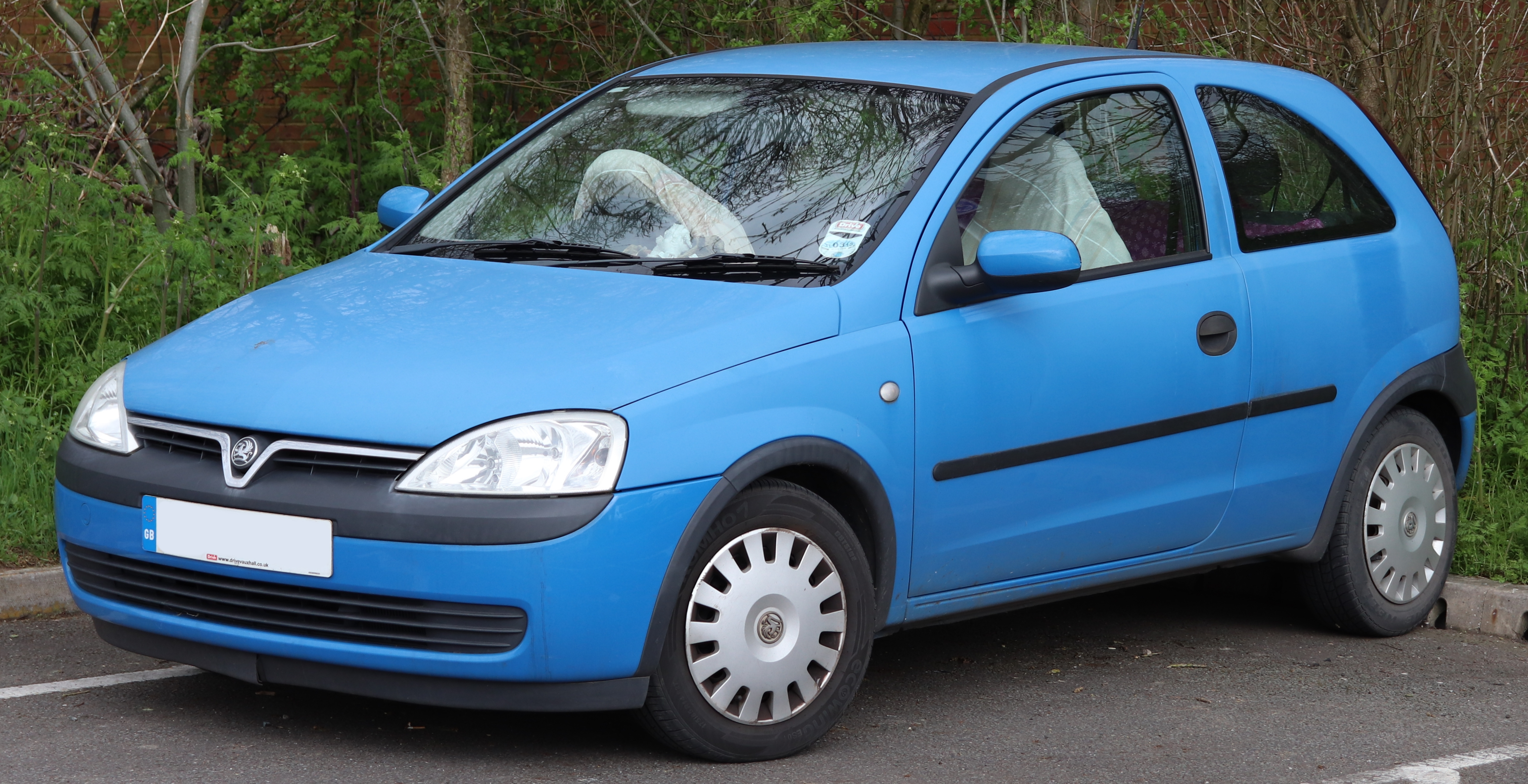
pre-facelift Vauxhall Corsa

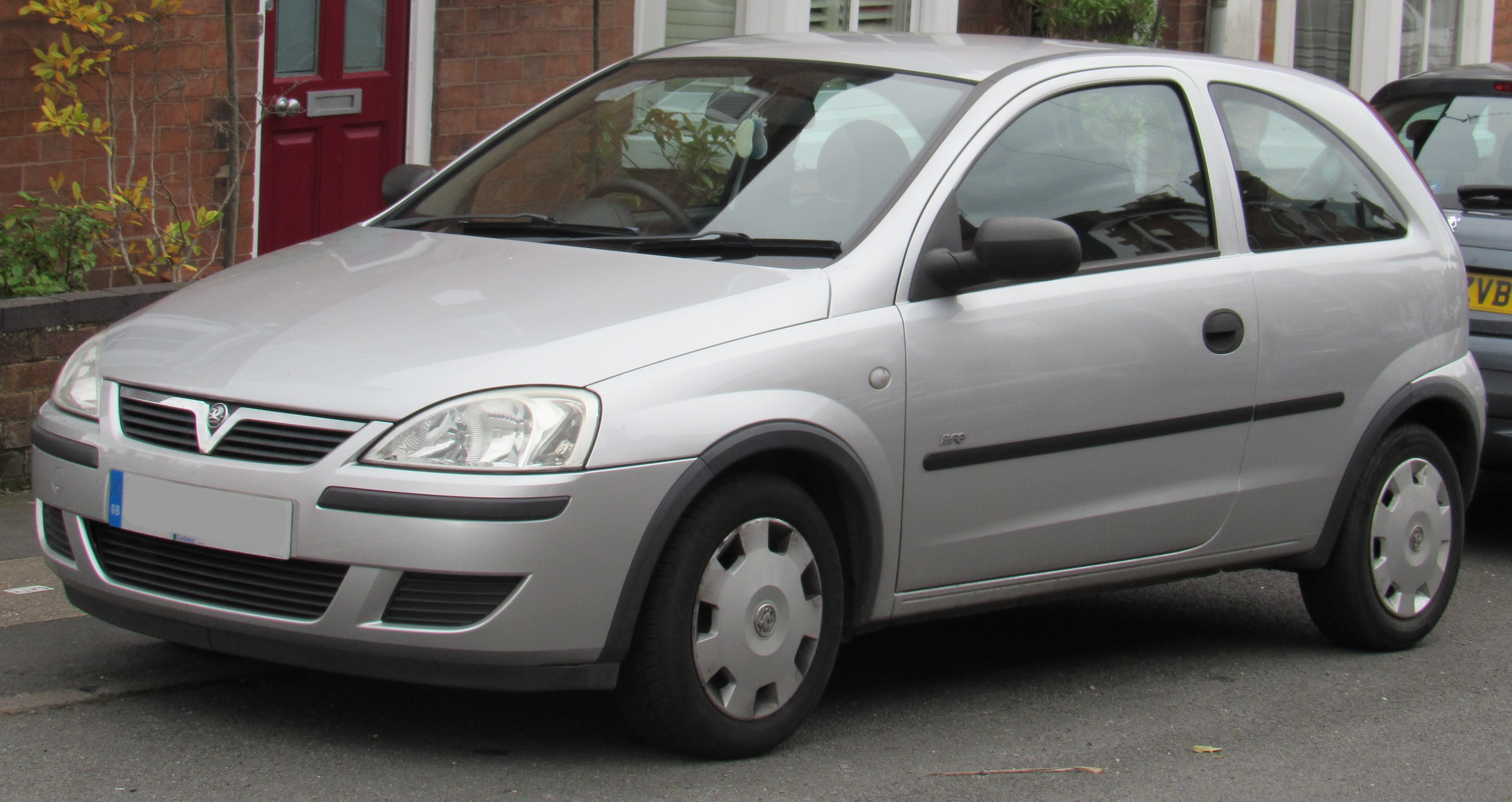
Post facelift Vauxhall Corsa

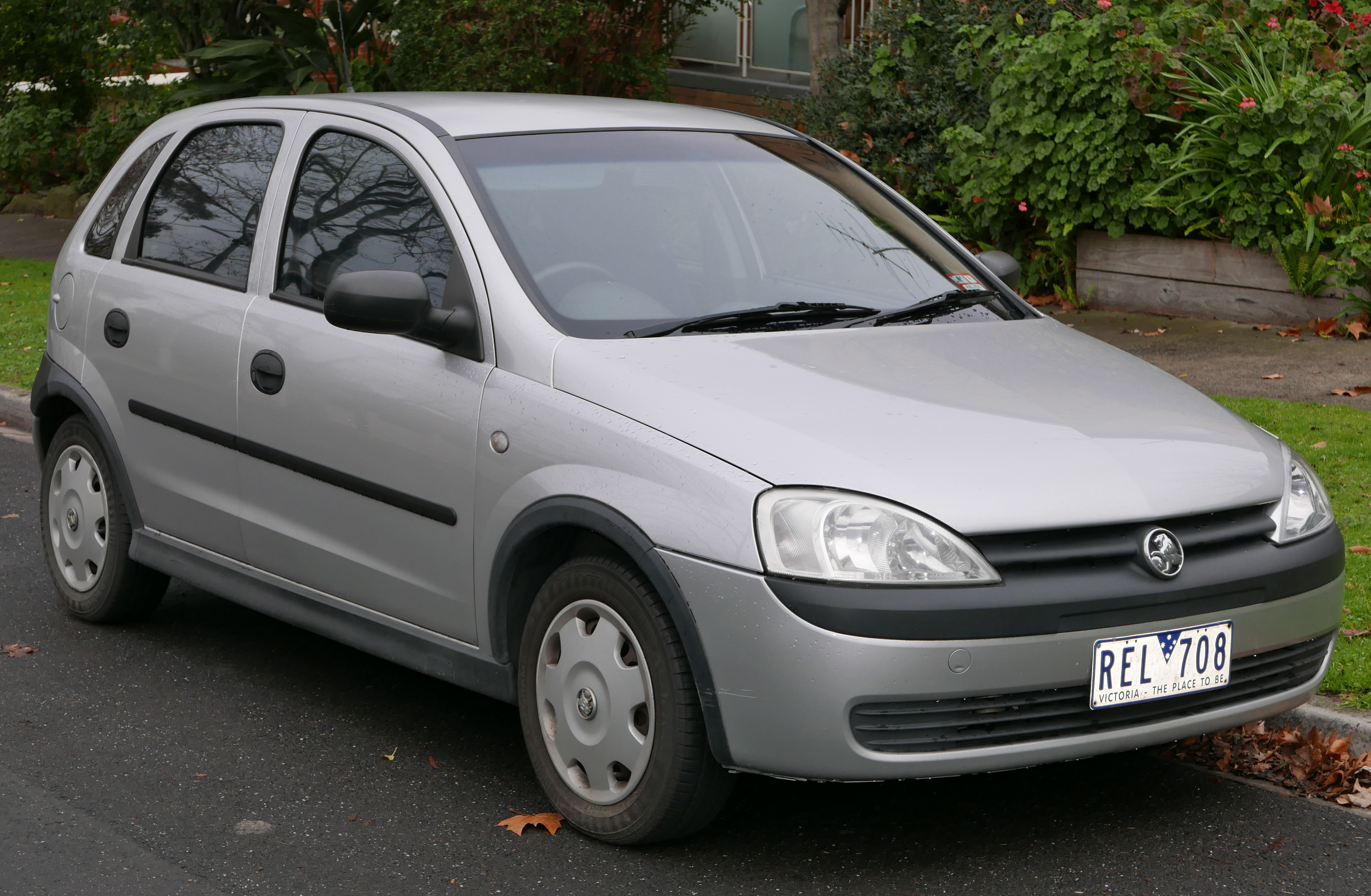
Holden Barina five-door (pre-facelift)

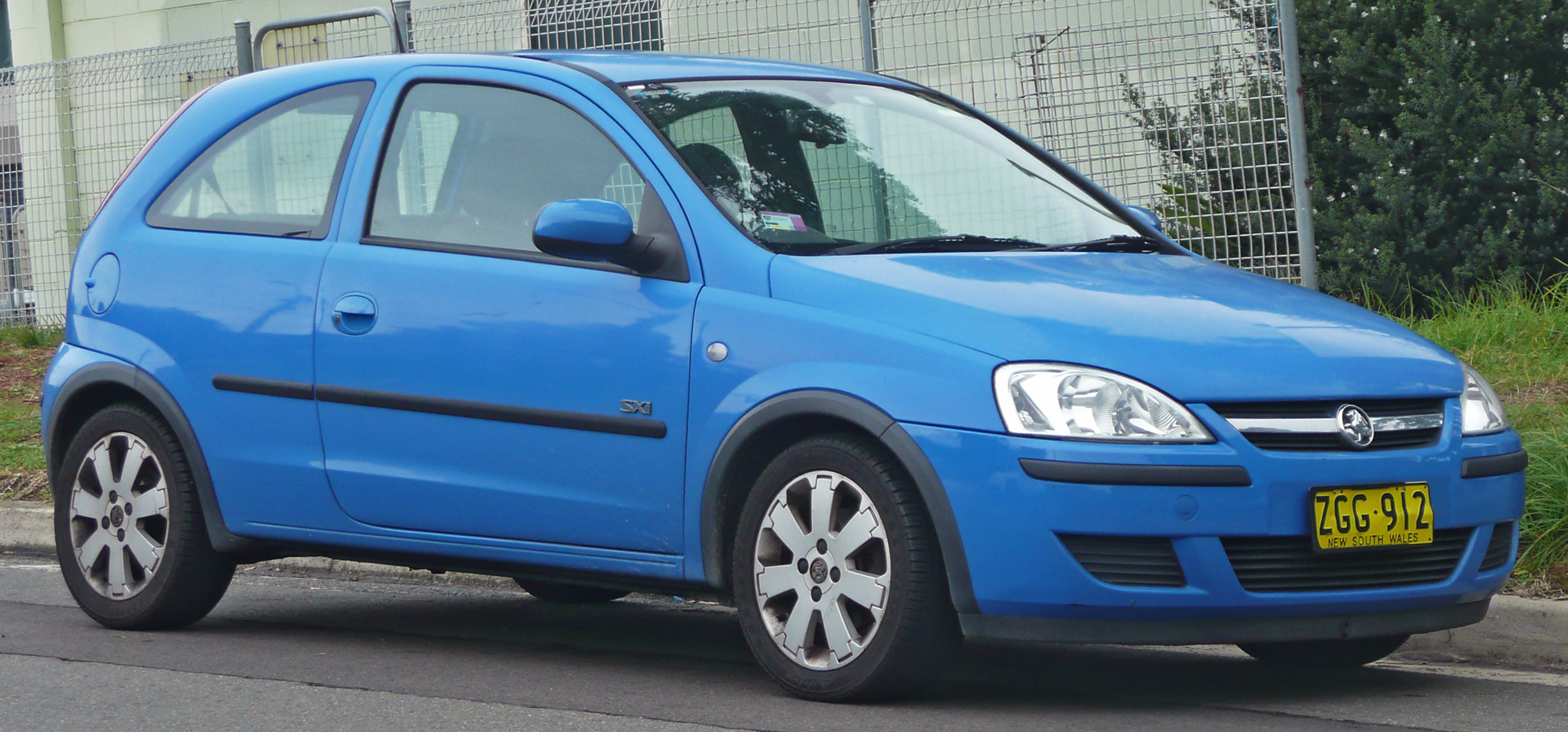
Holden Barina three-door (facelift)

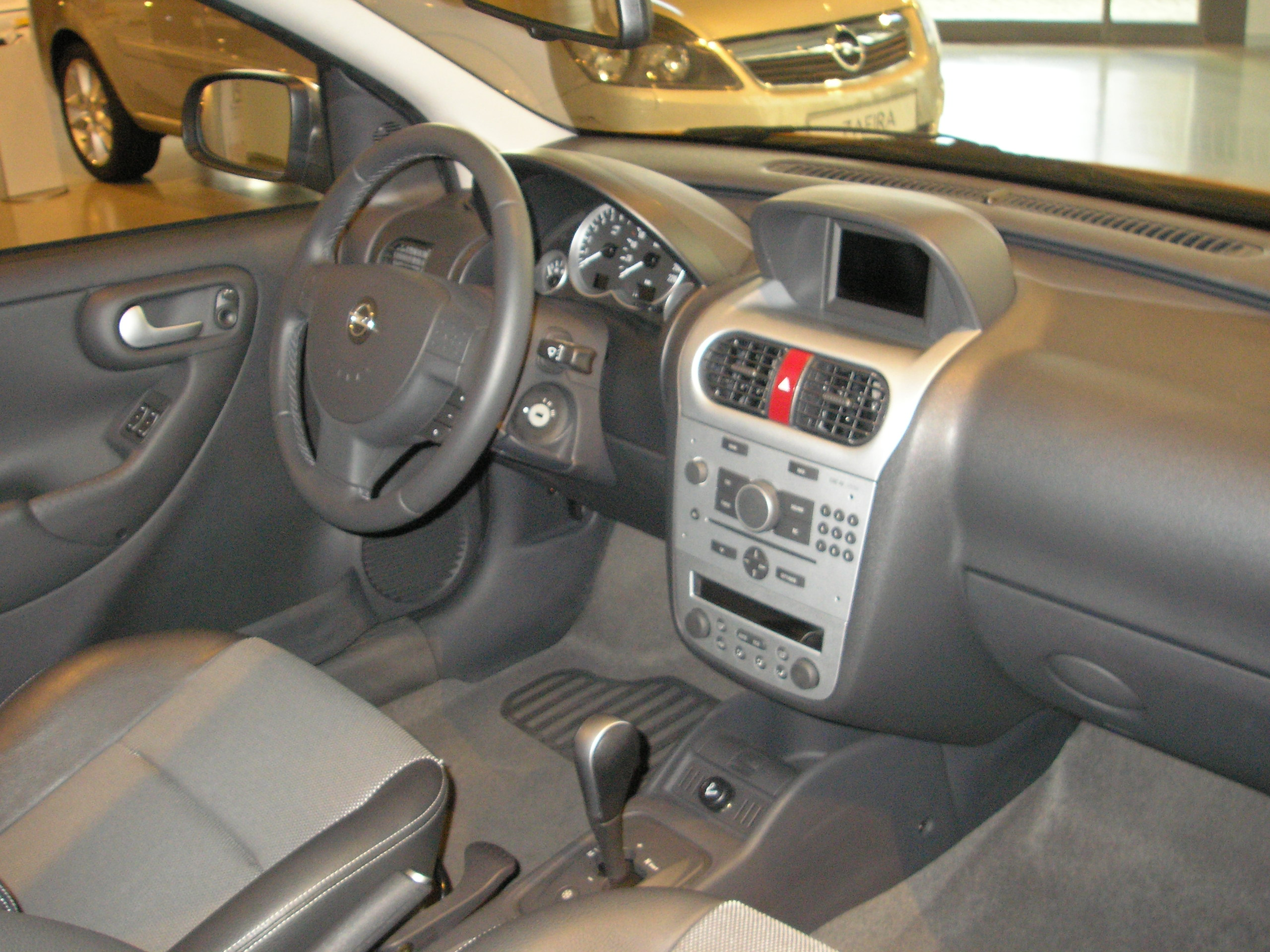
Interior

=== Safety ===
Euro NCAP test results for a LHD, three-door hatchback variant on a registration from 2002:

Test	Score	Points
Overall:	N/A	N/A
Adult occupant:	4/5 stars	25
Child occupant:	N/A	N/A
Pedestrian:	1/4 stars	9
Safety assist:	N/A	N/A

=== Argentina ===
The Argentinian version of the Corsa C (rebranded as "Corsa II" or "Corsa 2") was manufactured in GM's Alvear plant in Santa Fe Province, the export markets are unknown.

The Chevrolet Montana wasn't neither manufactured or imported.

=== Brazil ===
The Brazilian version of the Corsa sold in those countries featured a more conservative front end than its European counterpart.

Brazil also offered a pickup truck version of the Corsa named the Chevrolet Montana (sold in some markets as the Tornado), which, as well as the saloon, was exported in a completely knocked down form to South Africa for local assembly.

=== Mexico ===
The Corsa C arrived in the 2002 model year as a five-door hatchback, and was imported from Europe; but for the model year of 2003, the Corsa sold in Mexico began coming from Brazil and a saloon version was added. In 2005, the saloon version introduced an automated manual transmission called Easytronic because it was only offered in a five-speed manual transmission, however, the easytronic transmission was rapidly discontinued after the model year of 2007, because of poor sales and technical flaws.

For 2008, the Corsa was tweaked with a freshened grille, lights, and a gold-coloured Chevrolet logo. The Chevrolet Corsa C was discontinued in the Mexican market in June 2008, leaving only the older and freshened Chevy (Corsa B); and the Corsa C was replaced by the Chevrolet Aveo, however, Brazil kept the car until 2012 (as the Chevrolet Corsa Final Edition and with the saloon ending in 2011) and Argentina kept the car until 2010, while the Corsa-based Montana continued into 2010.

The Corsa C was that was sold in South America, was produced at the Rosario production plant in Argentina. The Latin American Corsa C featured the Opel inspired Chevrolet logo with a golden bowtie instead of a chromed one – the new logo was first introduced in the South American market with the new Chevrolet Vectra.

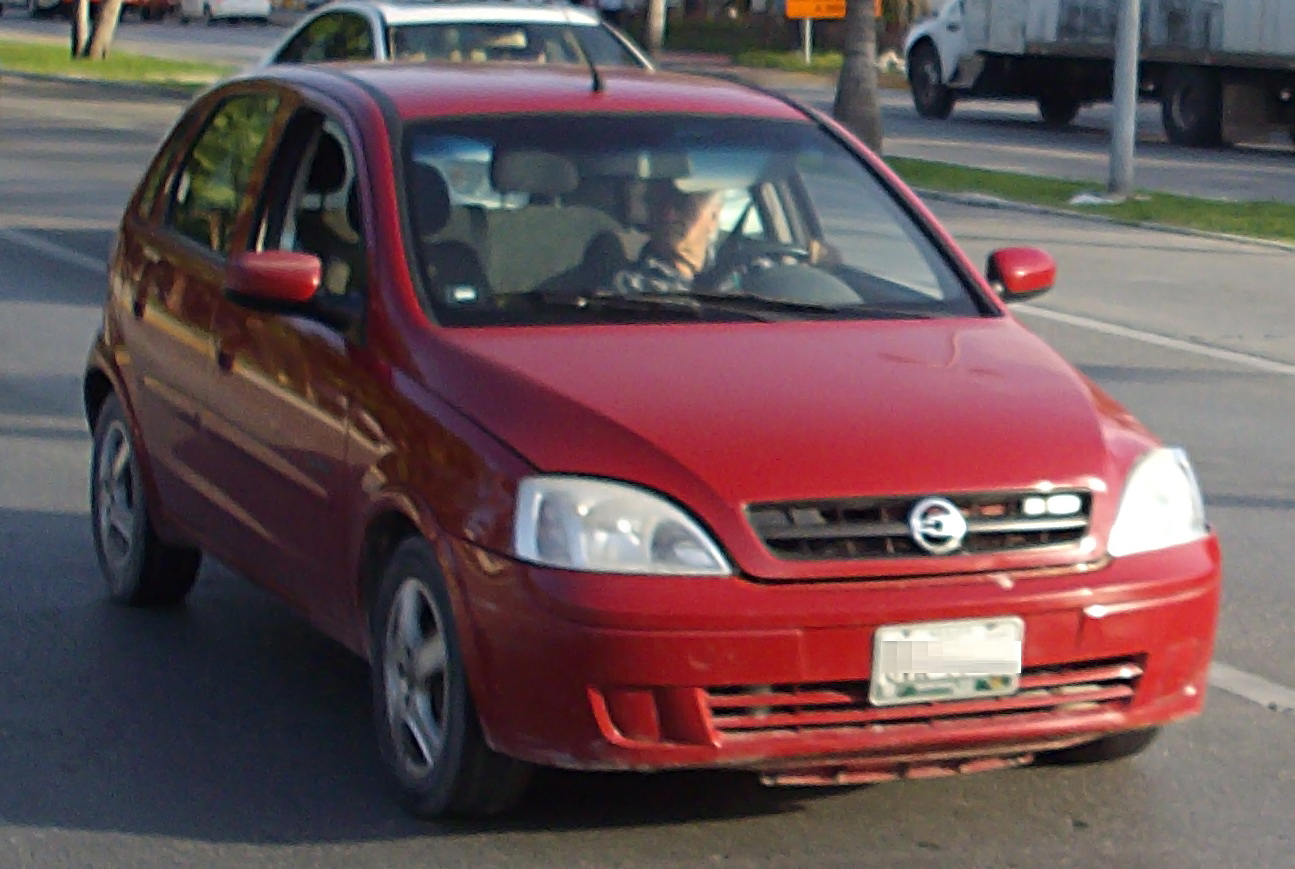
Chevrolet Corsa five-door

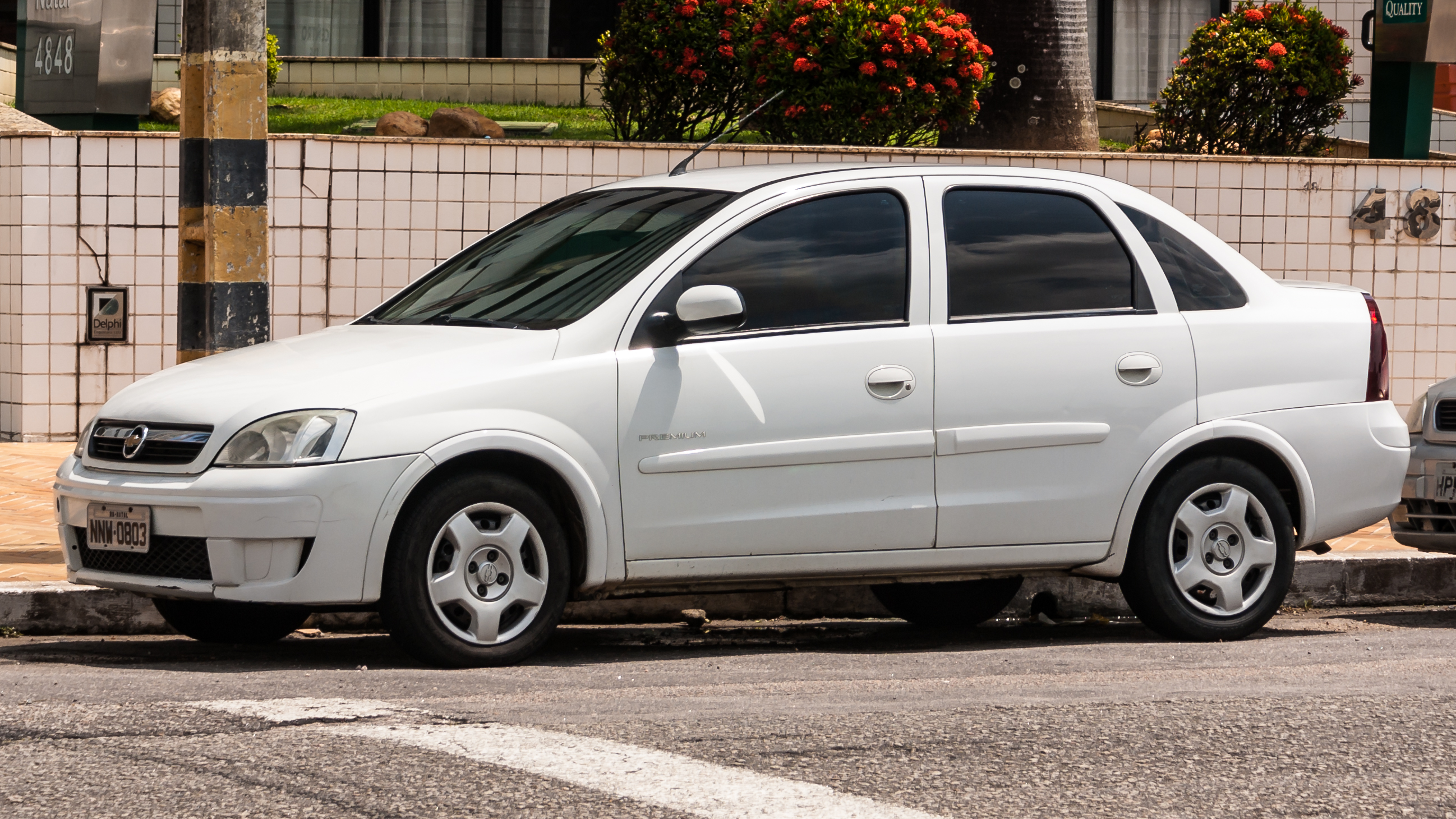
Chevrolet Corsa saloon

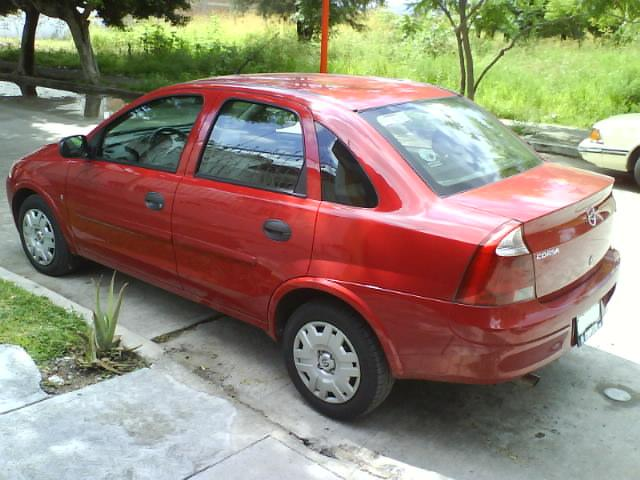
Chevrolet Corsa saloon

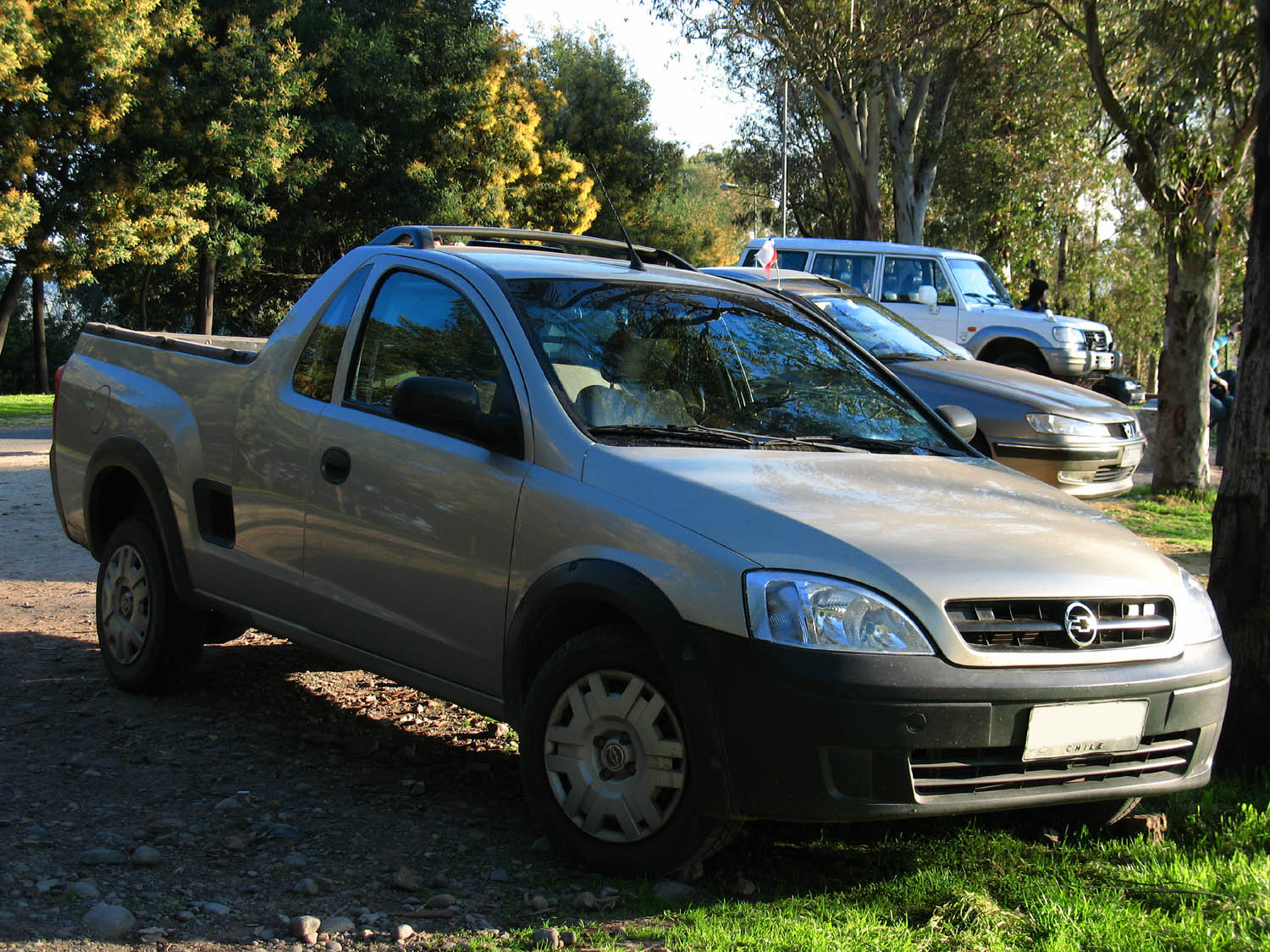
Chevrolet Montana pickup truck

=== South Africa ===
GM South Africa initially marketed the hatchback simply as the "New Corsa", later reverting to Corsa, while the previous generation Corsa B was still sold alongside the Corsa C and was branded as Corsa "Lite". A five-door hatchback (three-door was never offered) and four-door saloon as well as a pickup version known as the Corsa Utility was offered. In 2007, the Corsa C saloon was dropped in South Africa. The Corsa hatchback in South Africa did not have the same front fascia as the European Corsa. Instead, it had the same front fascia as the Latin American Chevrolet Corsa. Petrol engines were largely a carry over of the 8 valve SOHC variants from the Corsa B sold in South Africa, in displacements of 1.4 L (65 kW (88 PS)), 1.6 L (75 kW (102 PS)) and 1.8 L (79 kW (107 PS)), the 1.8 L was new for the Corsa C offered in range topping models, while this engine was never offered with a Corsa B, it was just a larger bore/stroke version of the existing engines. A 1.7DTi diesel was initially offered, with the a new 1.7CDTi diesel engine being added later.

=== Oceania ===
In Australia, the car was launched to much fanfare from many motor journalists, and went on to win the Wheels 2001 "Car of the Year" (COTY). Holden also imported the SRi version with the 1.8 L Astra motor and uprated sports suspension including traction control, ABS brakes, a better tyre/wheel combination, and Irmscher body kit to produce a "baby hot hatch" Barina.

The facelifted 2004 model was also imported; however, in December 2005, the Corsa C was suddenly dropped from the Australian and New Zealand Holden ranges as a cost-cutting measure by GM and was replaced by the Daewoo Kalos, rebadged as a Holden Barina. Motoring journalists were scathing in their criticism of the new model, particularly the bland handling, lackluster engine, and sub-par safety features. The Kalos-based Barina was subsequently replaced with a rebadged version of the Chevrolet Sonic/Daewoo Kalos T300 until stocks ran out in early 2019.

=== United Kingdom ===
This generation of the Corsa was a huge success for Vauxhall in the United Kingdom, which is the most popular supermini and second most popular car overall in 2002, 2003 and 2004. It was also Britain's best-selling supermini in 2005, achieving third place overall, but in 2006 (the final year of production) it lost top place in the supermini sector after five years and was overtaken by the Ford Fiesta. Overall, it was Britain's fourth most popular car in 2006.

=== Engine specifications ===
The Corsa C was introduced with a 1.7 L DTI Ecotec turbodiesel engine supplied by Isuzu (Circle L) with 75 hp (56 kW). This was later joined by the 1.7 L DI Ecotec turbodiesel engine also supplied by Isuzu. The 1.7 L DI Ecotec did not include an intercooler and this reduced power to 65 PS (48 kW). From 2003, a new 1.25 L CDTI Ecotec turbodiesel engine was supplied by Fiat (MultiJet); it produces 70 PS (51 kW). A 1.7-litre CDTI Ecotec turbodiesel supplied by Isuzu which produced 100 PS (74 kW) was also available. This new 1.7 L CDTI Ecotec featured a variable geometry turbocharger.

The 1.0 L and 1.2 L Ecotec Family 0 engines are carry overs from the Corsa B; the 1.4 L Family 1 engine was replaced with a new 1.4 L Family 0 model. The 1.8 L Family 1 engine is an upgrade for the previous 1.6 L 16 valve engine and produces 125 PS (92 kW) and 165 N⋅m (122 lb⋅ft) of torque. The edition with the 1.8 L engine was named Corsa GSi and was the predecessor of the new Corsa OPC.

In 2003, Opel introduced updated versions of Family 0 engines with TwinPort technology, and the 1.2 L engine gained 30 cc, giving it 80 PS (59 kW).

Petrol engines
Model	Production	Engine	Displacement	Power	Torque	Note
1.0 Ecotec 12V	2000–2003	I3	973 cc	58 PS (43 kW; 57 hp) at 5600 rpm	85 N⋅m (63 lb⋅ft) at 3800 rpm	
1.0 Ecotec 12V	2003–2006	I3	998 cc	60 PS (44 kW; 59 hp) at 5600 rpm	88 N⋅m (65 lb⋅ft) at 3800 rpm	Twinport
1.2 Ecotec 16V	2000–2004	I4	1,199 cc	75 PS (55 kW; 74 hp) at 5600 rpm	110 N⋅m (81 lb⋅ft) at 4000 rpm	
1.2 Ecotec 16V	2004–2006	I4	1,229 cc	80 PS (59 kW; 79 hp) at 5600 rpm	110 N⋅m (81 lb⋅ft) at 4000 rpm	Twinport
1.4 Ecotec 16V	2000–2003	I4	1,389 cc	90 PS (66 kW; 89 hp) at 6000 rpm	125 N⋅m (92 lb⋅ft) at 4000 rpm	
1.4 Ecotec 16V	2003–2006	I4	1,364 cc	90 PS (66 kW; 89 hp) at 5600 rpm	125 N⋅m (92 lb⋅ft) at 4000 rpm	Twinport
1.8 Ecotec 16V	2000–2003	I4	1,796 cc	125 PS (92 kW; 123 hp) at 6000 rpm	165 N⋅m (122 lb⋅ft) at 4600 rpm	GSi
Brazilian engines
1.0 L 8V VHC	2002–2005	I4	999 cc	71 PS (52 kW; 70 hp) at 6400 rpm	86 N⋅m (63 lb⋅ft) at 3000 rpm	Base/Joy/Maxx/Premium
1.0 L 8V VHC FlexPower	2006–2009	I4	999 cc	77–79 PS (57–58 kW; 76–78 hp) at 6400 rpm	91–92 N⋅m (67–68 lb⋅ft) at 5200 rpm	Joy/Maxx/Premium
1.4 L 8V Econo.Flex	2008–2012	I4	1,389 cc	99–105 PS (73–77 kW; 98–104 hp) at 6000 rpm	129–131 N⋅m (95–97 lb⋅ft) at 2800 rpm	Maxx/Premium
1.8 L 8V MPFI	2002–2003	I4	1,796 cc	102 PS (75 kW; 101 hp) at 5200 rpm	164.75 N⋅m (122 lb⋅ft) at 2800 rpm	
1.8 L 8V FlexPower	2003-2005	I4	1,796 cc	105–109 PS (77–80 kW; 104–108 hp) at 5400 rpm	169.66–178.48 N⋅m (125–132 lb⋅ft) at 2800 rpm	Joy/Maxx/Premium
1.8 L 8V FlexPower	2005–2009	I4	1,796 cc	112–114 PS (82–84 kW; 110–112 hp) at 5400 rpm	173.58 N⋅m (128 lb⋅ft) at 2800 rpm	Joy/Maxx/Premium/SS
Diesel engines
Model	Production	Engine	Displacement	Power	Torque	Note
1.3 CDTI Ecotec 16V	2003–2006 Z13DT	I4	1,248 cc	70 PS (51 kW; 69 hp) at 4000 rpm	170 N⋅m (125 lb⋅ft) at 1750–2500 rpm	Fiat engine
1.7 DI 16V	2000–2003 Y17DTL	I4	1,686 cc	65 PS (48 kW; 64 hp) at 4400 rpm	130 N⋅m (96 lb⋅ft) at 2000–3000 rpm	No intercooler
1.7 DTI 16V	2000–2003 Y17DT	I4	1,686 cc	75 PS (55 kW; 74 hp) at 4400 rpm	165 N⋅m (122 lb⋅ft) at 1800–3000 rpm	
1.7 CDTI Ecotec 16V	2003–2005 Z17DTH	I4	1,686 cc	100 PS (74 kW; 99 hp) at 4400 rpm	240 N⋅m (177 lb⋅ft) at 2300 rpm	VGT

== Corsa D (S07; 2006) ==
Corsa D
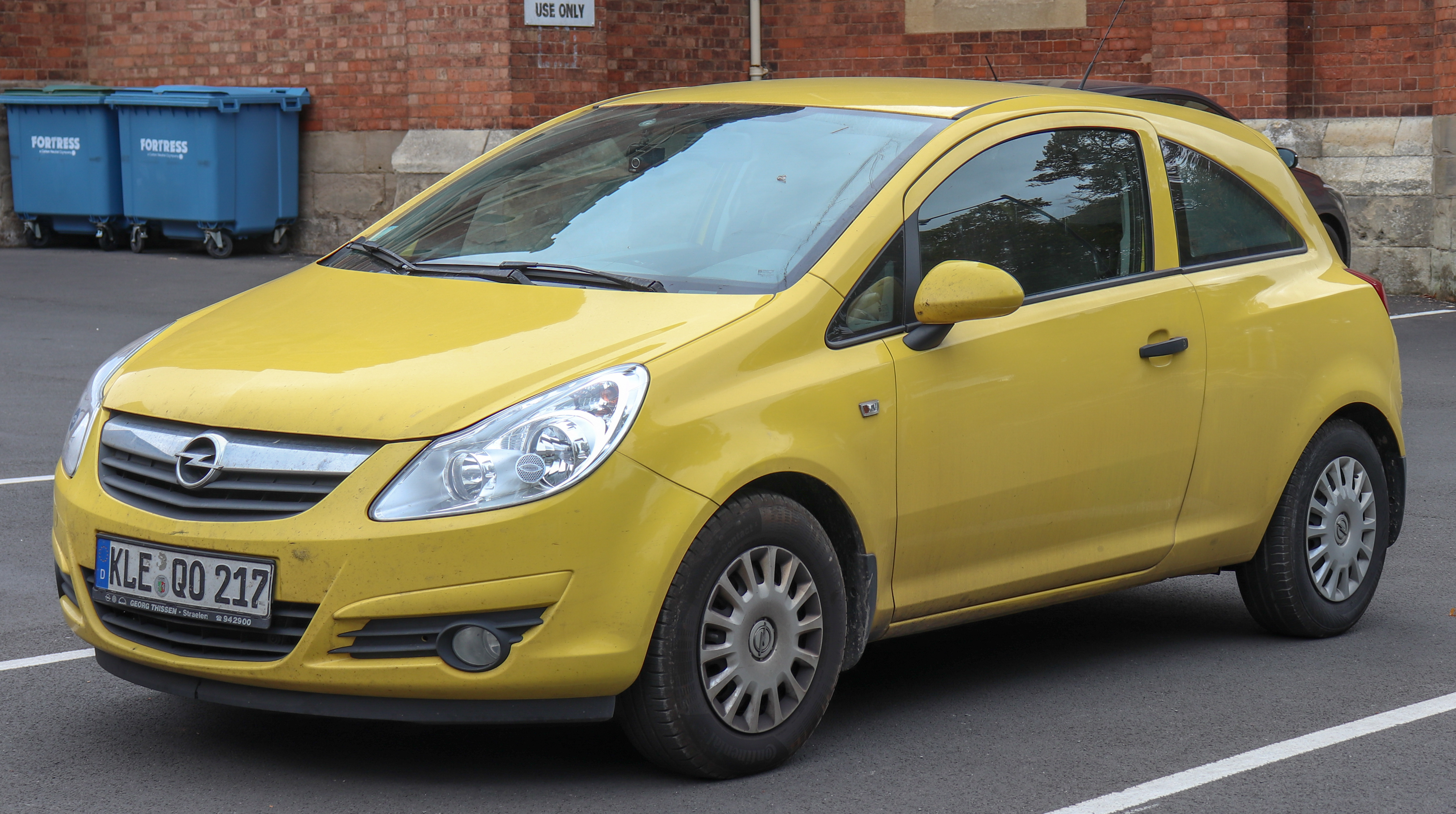

Overview
- Model code: S07
- Also called: Vauxhall Corsa
- Production: 2006–2014
- Assembly: Germany: Eisenach; Spain: Zaragoza
- Designer: Niels Loeb; Dietmar Finger (interior, 2004)

Body and chassis
- Body style: 3- and 5-door hatchback 3-door car-derived van
- Platform: SCCS platform
- Related: Fiat Punto; Alfa Romeo MiTo

Powertrain
- Engine: petrol: 1.0 L A10XEP (LDB) I3; 1.2 L A12XER (LWD/LDC) I4; 1.4 L A14XEL/XER (L2Z/LDD) I4; 1.4 L A14NEL (LUH) turbo I4; 1.6 L A16LER (LDW) turbo I4; diesel: 1.25 L LDV/LSF I4; 1.7 L Circle L I4
- Transmission: 5/6-speed manual; 5/6-speed ZF Easytronic automated manual; 4-speed Aisin AF13 automatic

Dimensions
- Wheelbase: 2,511 mm (98.9 in)
- Length: 3,999 mm (157.4 in)
- Width: 1,737 mm (68.4 in)
- Height: 1,488 mm (58.6 in)
- Curb weight: 1,100 kg (2,425 lb)

The Corsa D was created using a new version of the SCCS platform, which was co-developed by General Motors/Opel and Fiat, and is also employed by the 2005 Fiat Grande Punto. The first official pictures of the Corsa D were released by Opel in May 2006. In the United Kingdom, What Car? awarded it 2007 Car of the Year. The Corsa D placed second in the European Car of the Year for 2007, only behind the Ford S-Max.

The Corsa D is available in both three- and five-door versions and marketed as the Vauxhall Corsa in the United Kingdom. The same engines sizes from the Corsa C were available at launch, although the 1.3 L CDTI and 1.7 L CDTI engines were upgraded, with power ranging from 75 PS (55 kW) to 125 PS (92 kW).

The 192 PS (141 kW) OPC/VXR version went on sale in the beginning of 2007, with a 1.6 L turbocharged petrol engine powering the front wheels.

The 75 PS (55 kW) 1.3 CDTI (actual displacement was 1.25 litres) engine was updated in the middle of 2007 to bring CO_{2} levels to just 119 g/km, meaning that twelve months' Vehicle Excise Duty in the United Kingdom costs £30 and is eligible for the Plan 2000E (a rebate of €2000 in the purchase of a new car) in Spain.

The Corsa D was briefly available in Australia under the Opel brand name, rather than as a Holden as the Corsa B and C had previously been, during Opel's short-lived foray into the Australian market. Less than a year after launching, Opel Australia announced it was ceasing operations, removing the Corsa from the Australian market.

The Corsa D was never available in Japan, as Yanase had stopped importing the Opel Vita in April 2004, due to declining sales. Opel withdrew altogether from the Japanese market in December 2006, due to low sales the previous year.

At an early stage of the Corsa D's development in 2004, Dietmar Finger was tasked to design the outer panel for the glove box in the Corsa. Allegedly, his son suggested drawing a shark instead. The designer managed to hide it so well, on the hinge of the glove compartment that it was never removed, and featured on all production models. The custom of having a shark graphic in the interior continued for other Opel cars even after Opel has been taken over by PSA.

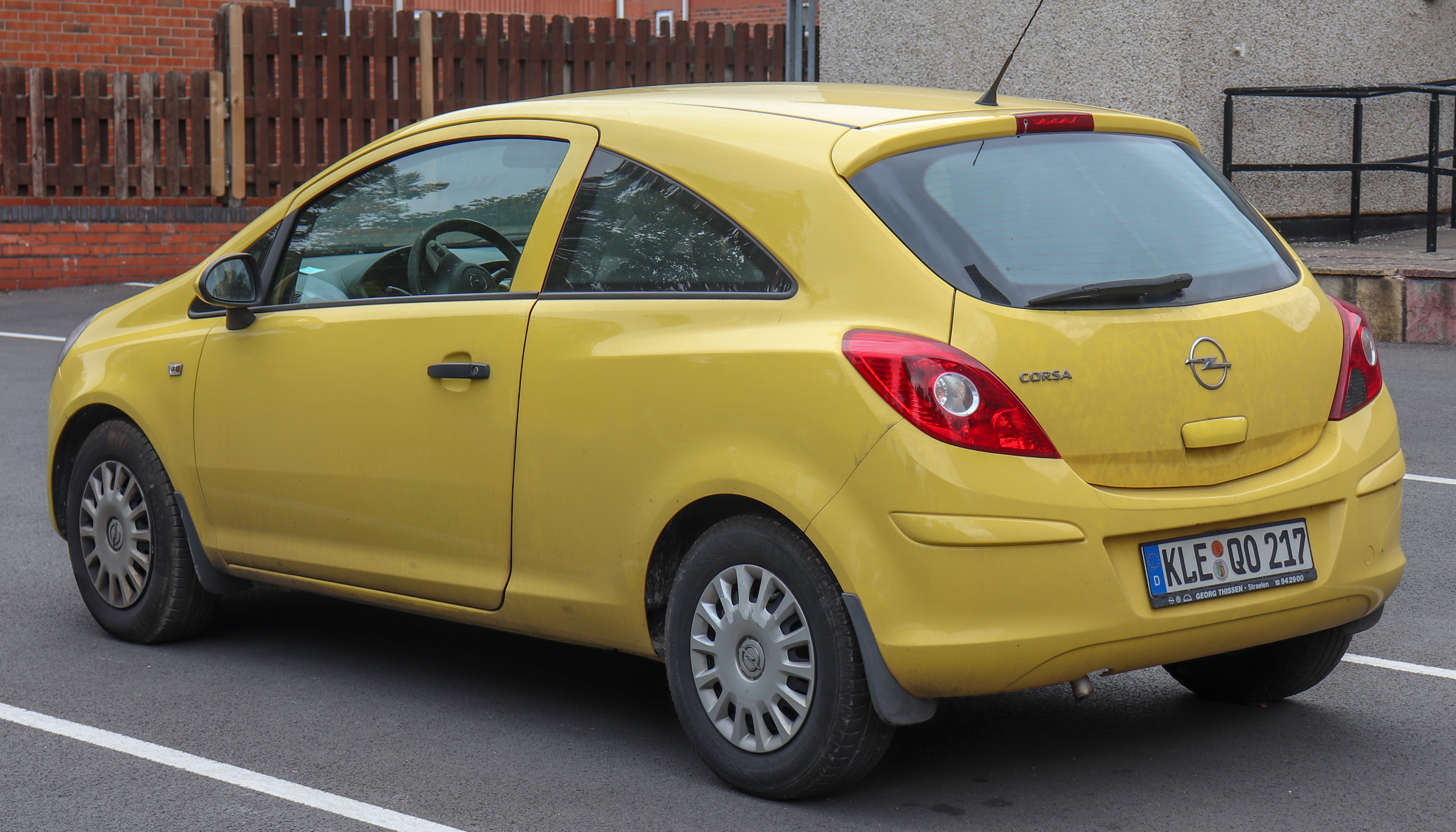
Opel Corsa (three-door)

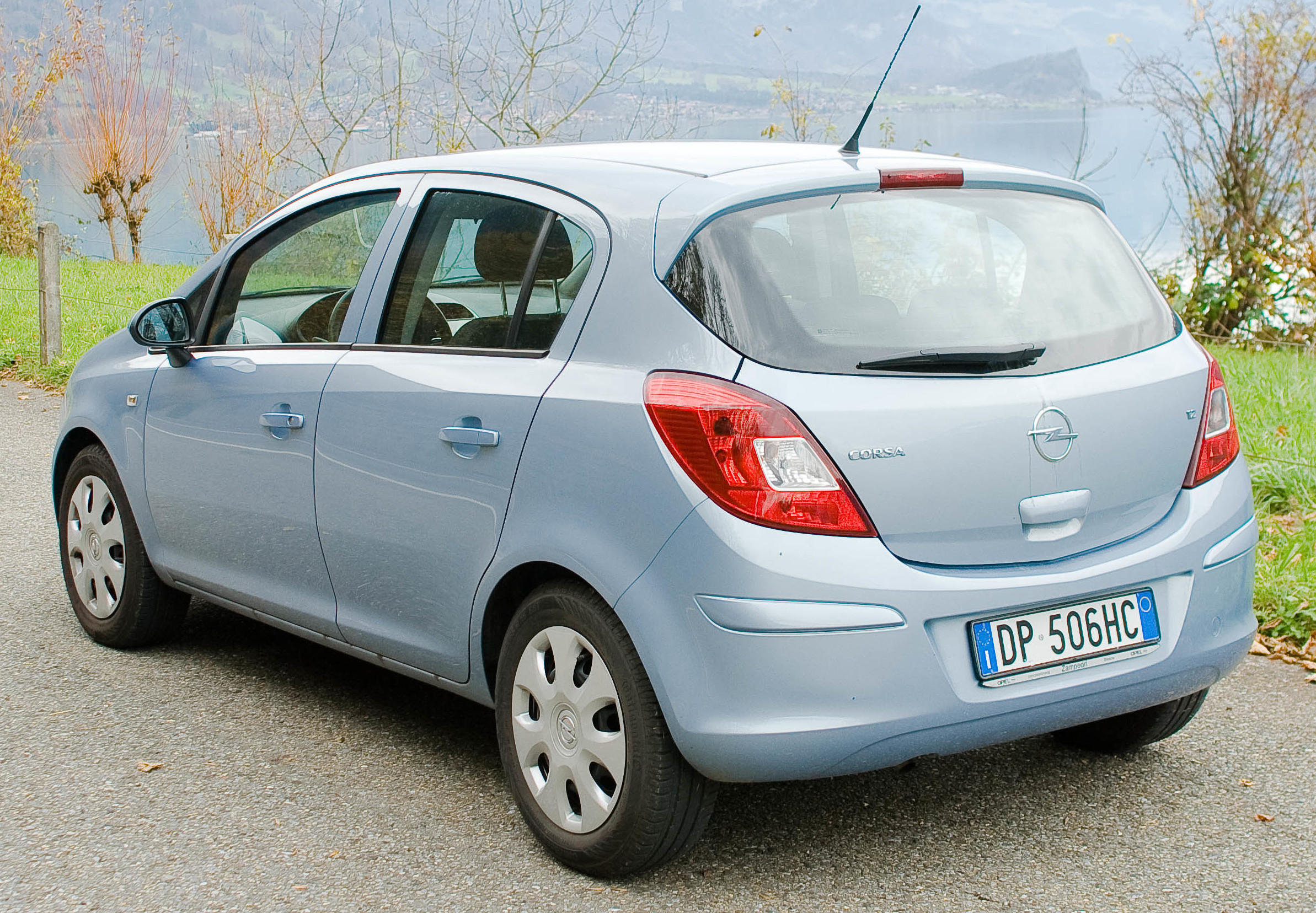
Opel Corsa (five-door)

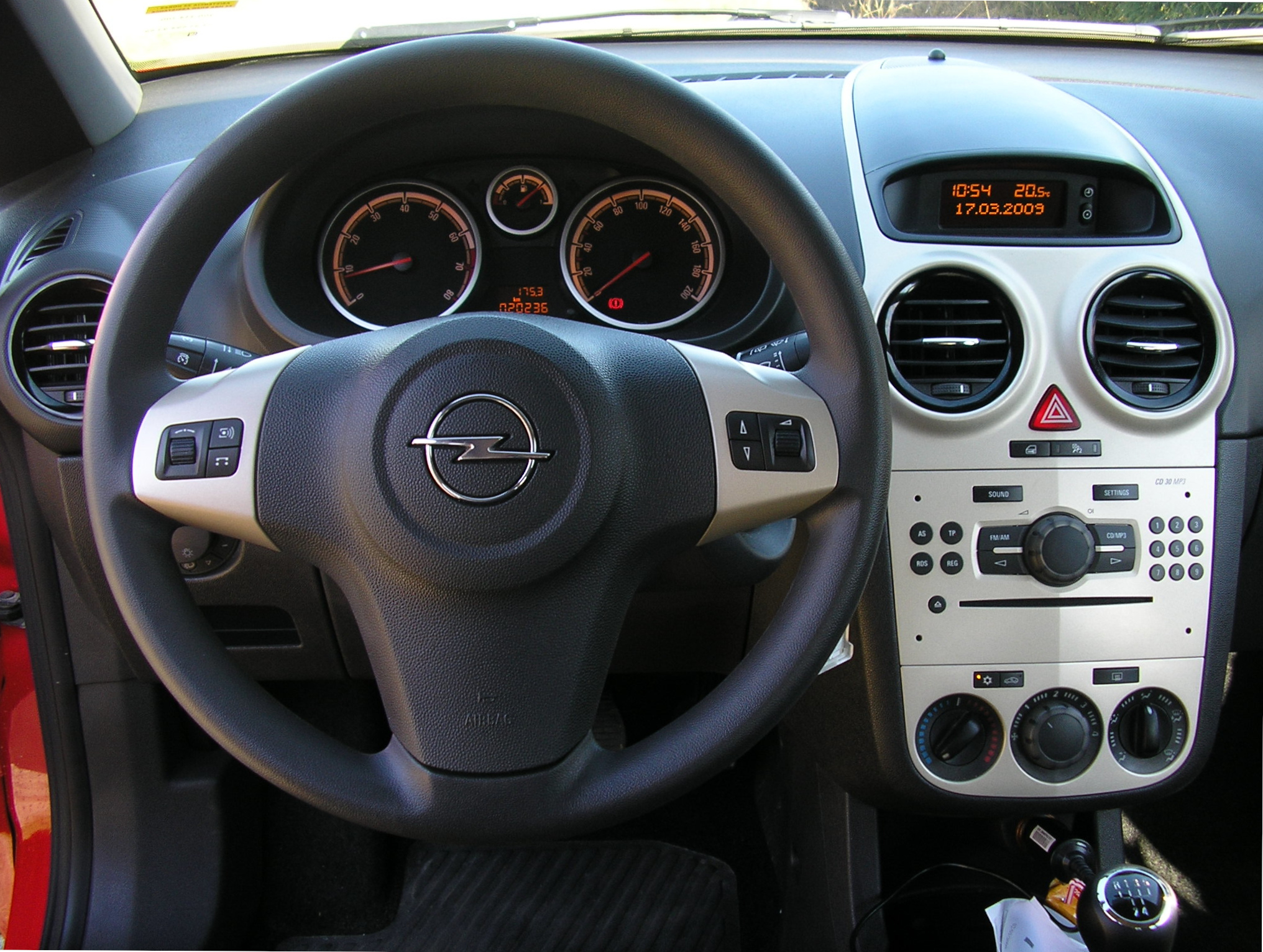
Dashboard

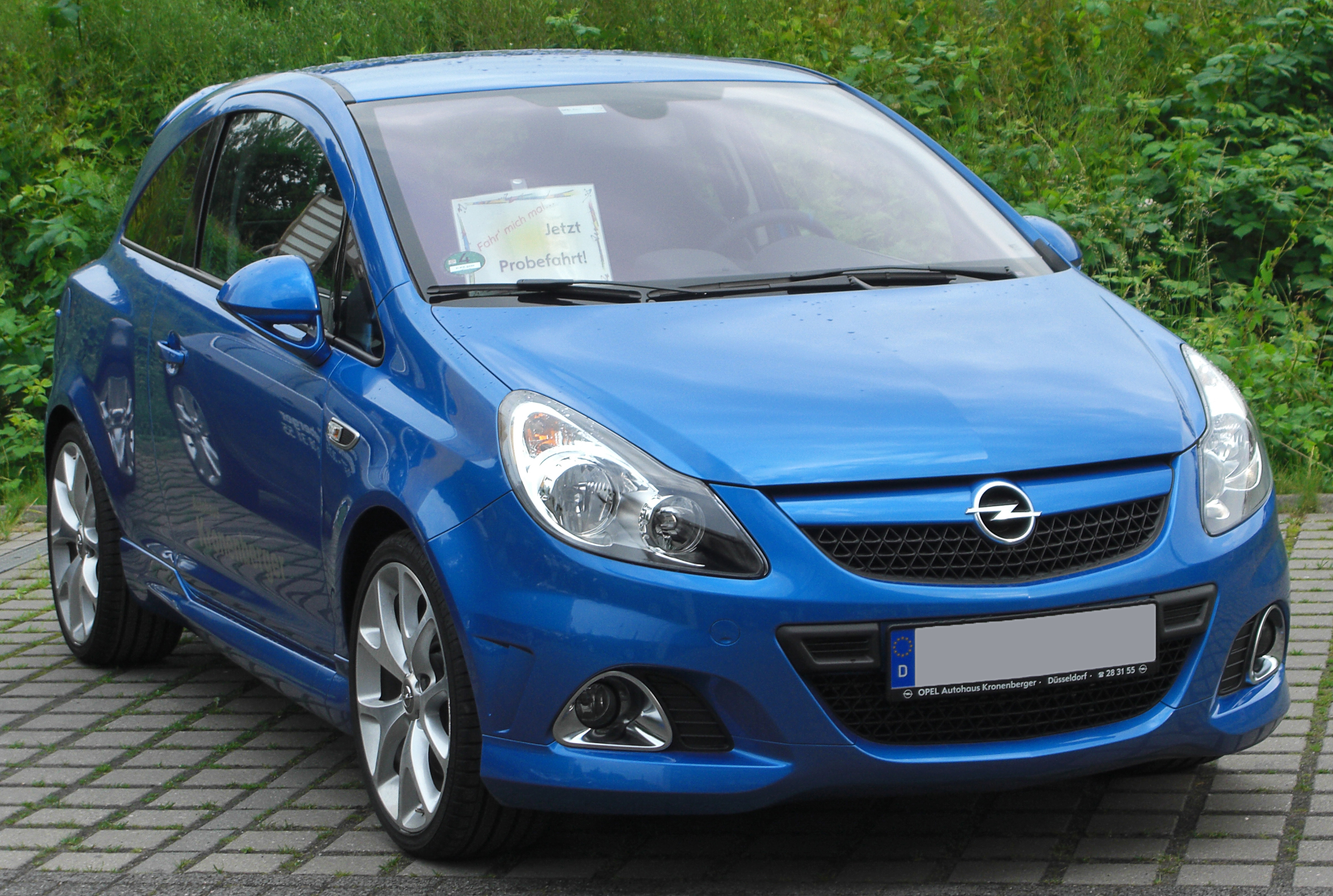
Opel Corsa OPC

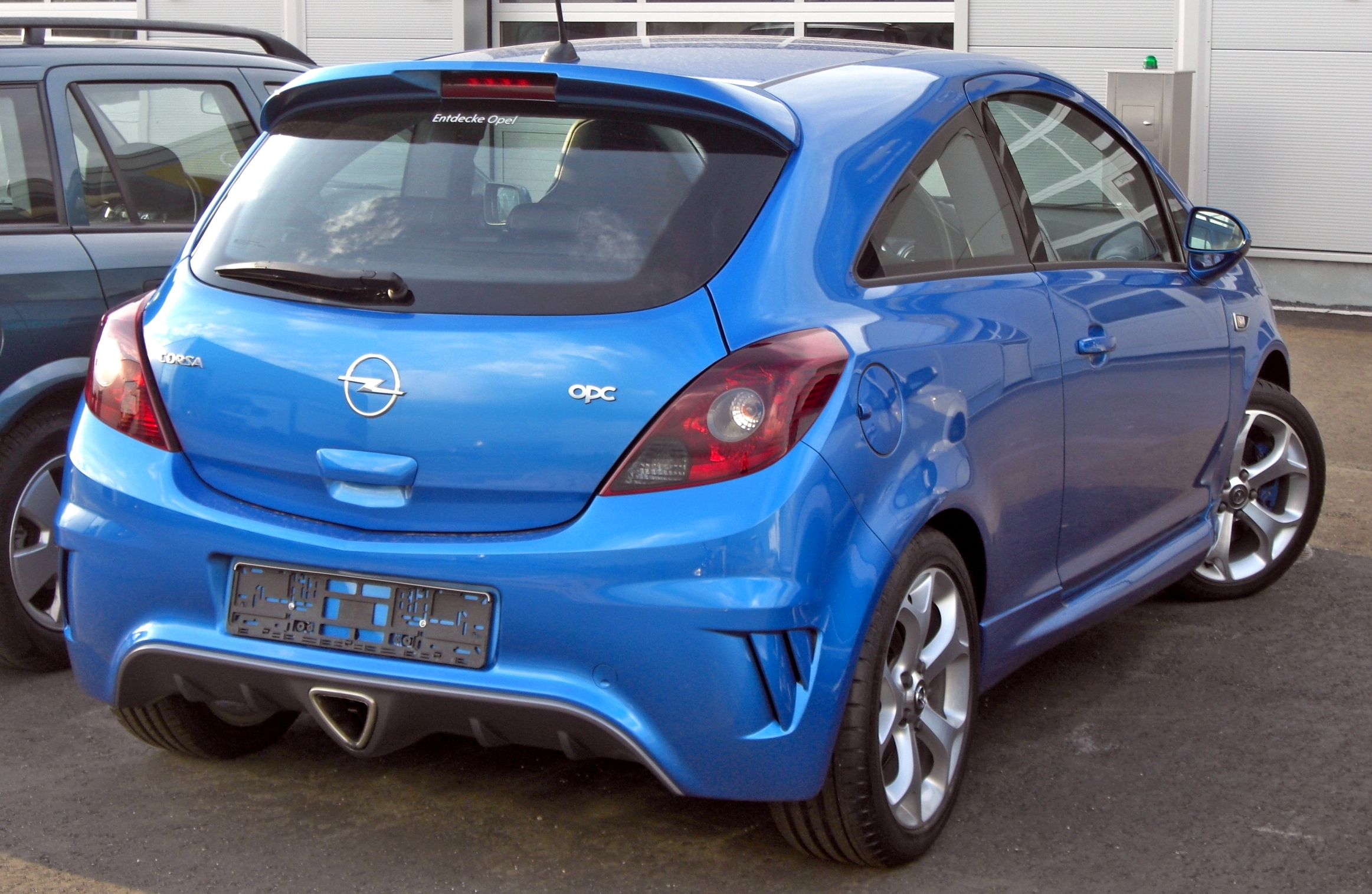
Rear view

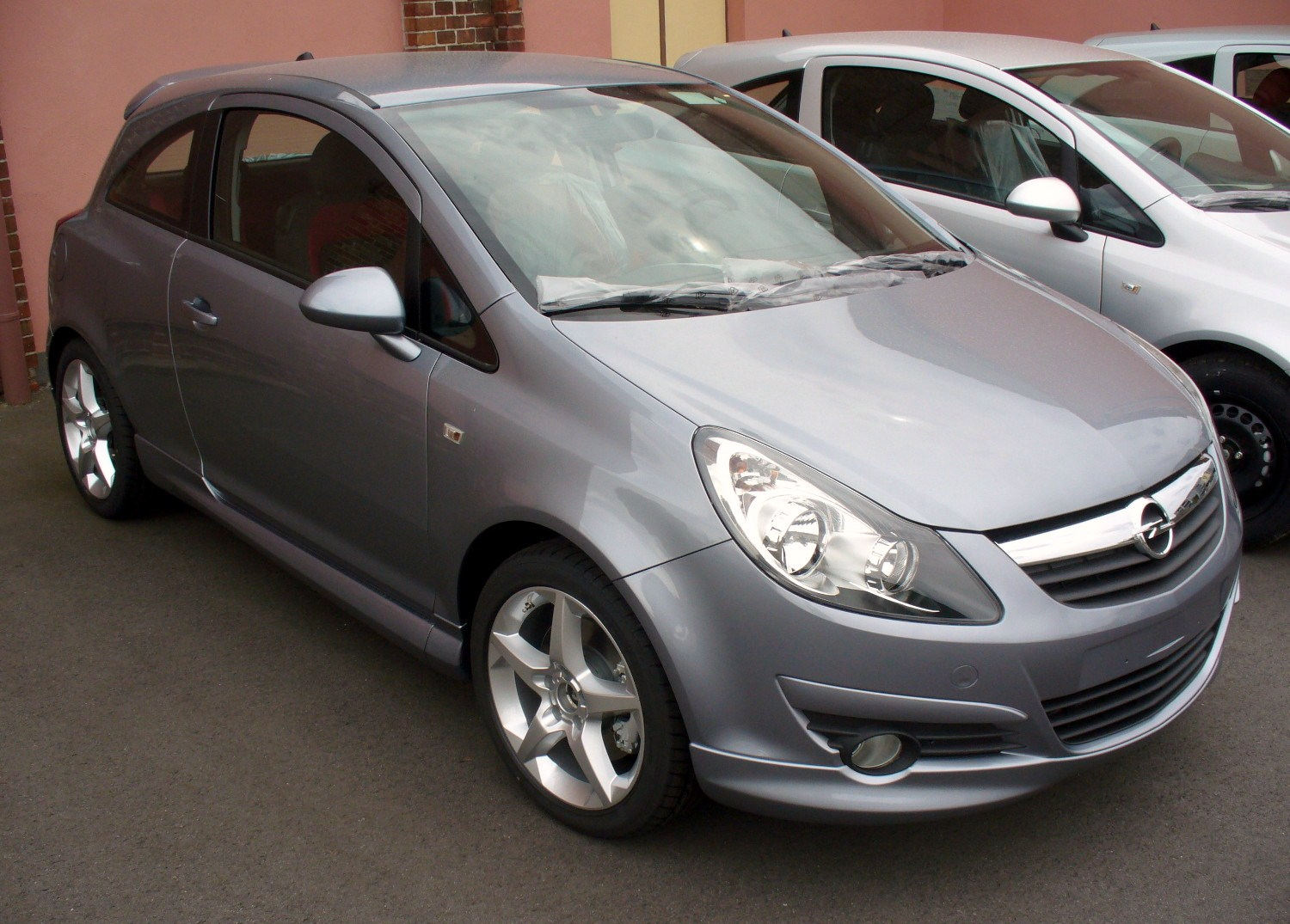
Opel Corsa GSi

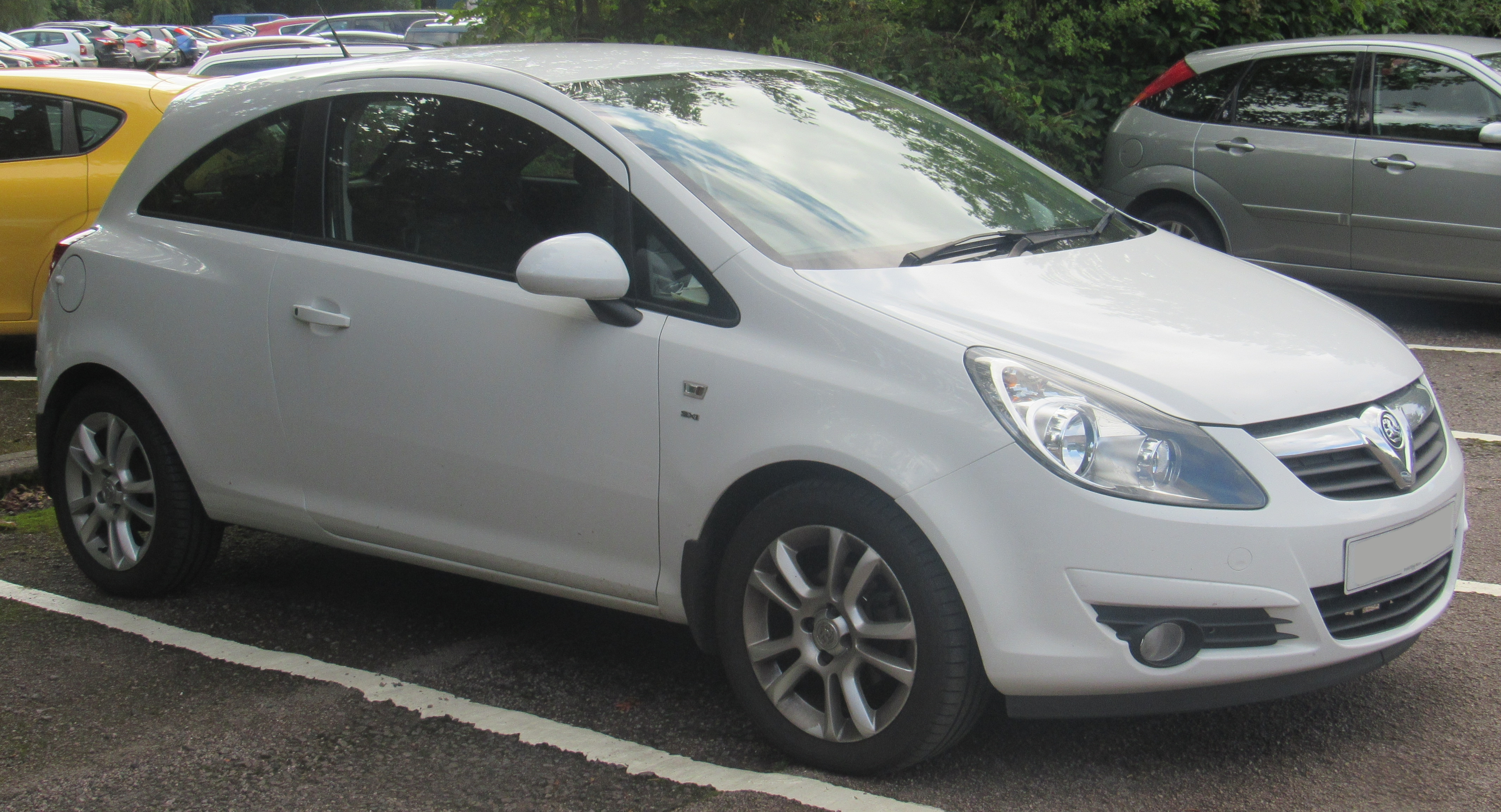
Vauxhall Corsa SXi

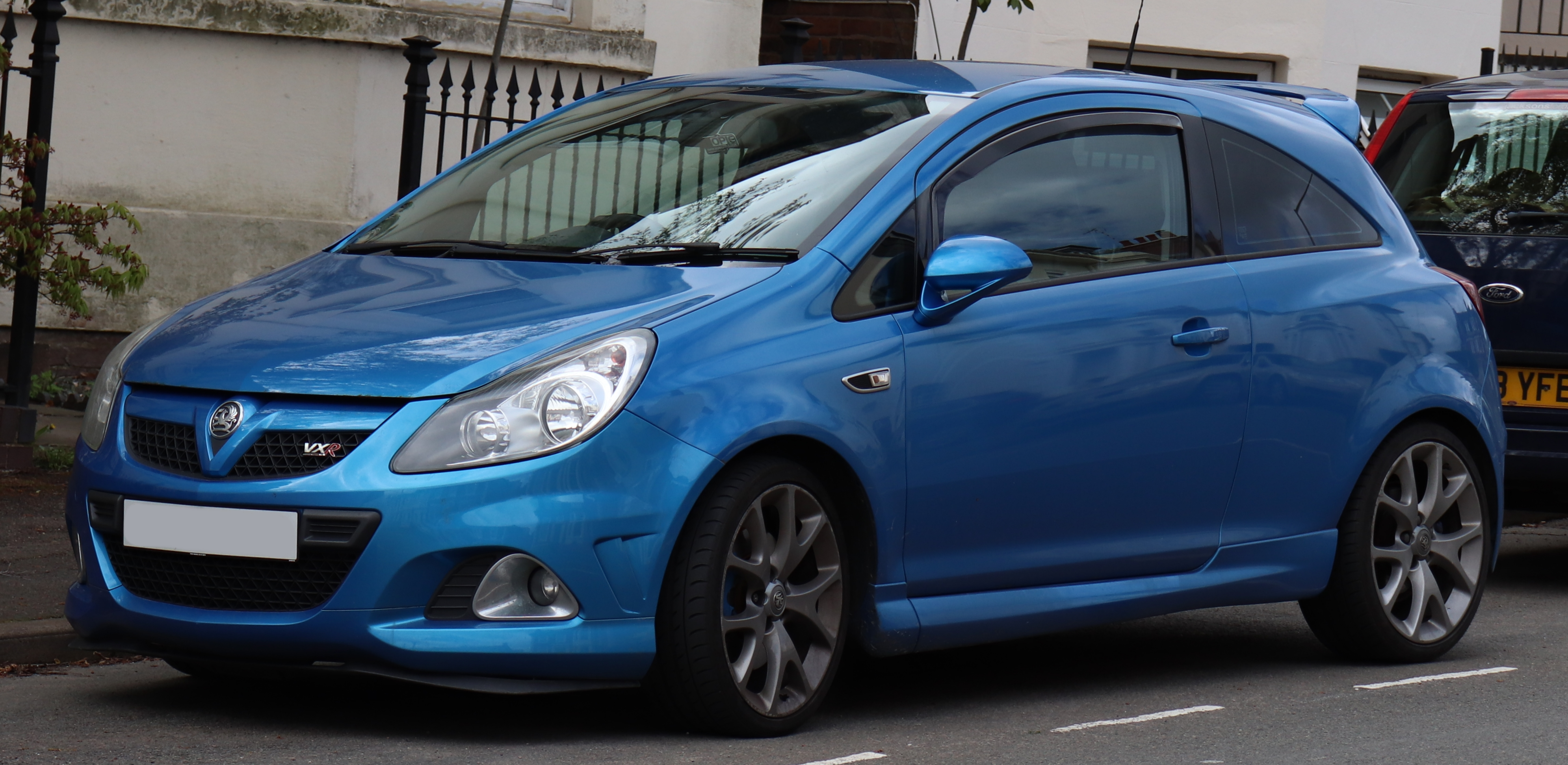
Vauxhall Corsa VXR

=== Safety ===
ANCAP test results* Opel Corsa 3 door hatches with 1.4L engine (2012)
Test	Score
Overall	5 /5 stars
Frontal offset	14.72/16
Side impact	16/16
Pole	2/2
Seat belt reminders	1/3
Whiplash protection	Adequate
Pedestrian protection	Adequate
Electronic stability control	Standard

Euro NCAP test results for a LHD, three-door hatchback variant on a registration from 2006:

Test	Score	Points
Overall:	N/A	N/A
Adult occupant:	5/5 stars	34
Child occupant:	3/5 stars	32
Pedestrian:	3/4 stars	19
Safety assist:	N/A	N/A

=== FlexFix ===
FlexFix is an optional integrated bicycle rack. It is essentially a concealed drawer that can be pulled out from the car's rear bumper. Attached are two-wheel mount bike racks, rear number plate incorporated in the system, brake/tail lights, indicators and fog and reverse light alternates in left-hand drive and right-hand drive cars. It is available as an option on Exclusiv, SE, and SXi models in the United Kingdom.

=== OPC/VXR ===
In 2007, Opel introduced a sport version of the Corsa tuned by Opel Performance Center (OPC) – Corsa OPC. This Corsa has a 1.6-litre I4 turbo engine with 141 kW (192 PS; 189 hp) at 5,850 rpm and 230 N⋅m (170 lb⋅ft) of torque at 1,980 to 5,850 rpm, with an overboost function which boosts up the torque figure to 266 N⋅m (196 lb⋅ft). The 0 to 100 km/h (62 mph) time is 7.2 seconds and top speed is 225 km/h (140 mph). Differences from the standard Corsa in the interior are sporty Recaro seats, OPC steering wheel and gear knob and instrument dials with OPC background.

On the exterior, there are different front and rear bumpers with triangle-shaped exhaust, and wind diffusers. There are also OPC tail spoilers and skirts. The car has stiffer and lower suspension than the regular Corsa as well. Standard rims are 17 inches and an optional 18 inches. The Corsa OPC was only available as a three-door version.

In the UK, it is sold as the Vauxhall Corsa VXR (Vauxhall Racing).

==== OPC/VXR Nürburgring Edition ====
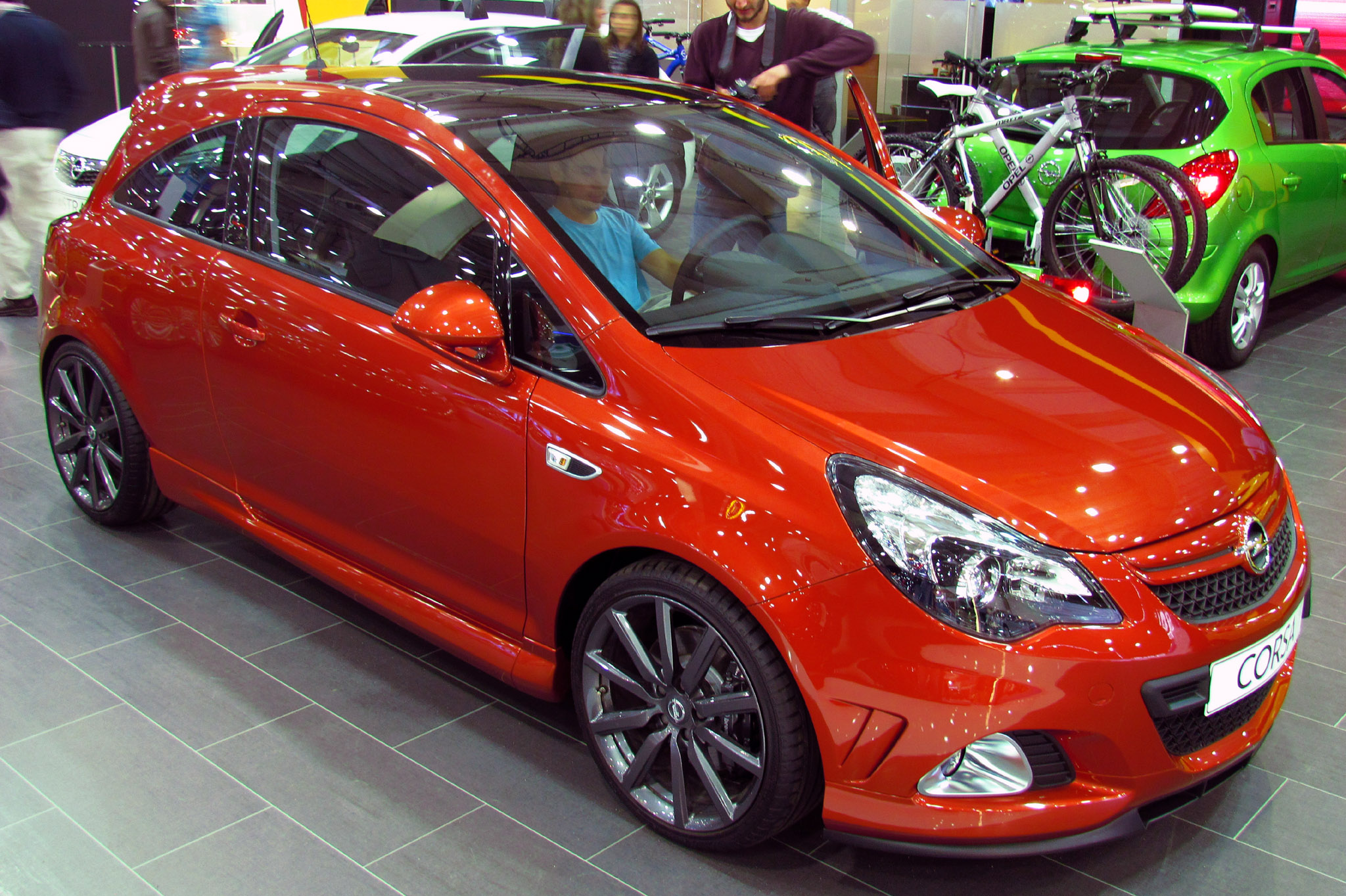
2013 OPC Nürburgring Edition, in Santiago Carshow, Chile 2012

The Opel Performance Center in 2011 launched a hardcore version of the Corsa OPC called the Corsa OPC Nürburgring Edition. The engine is the same, 1.6-litre turbo, but it has been tuned to punch out 210 PS (154 kW; 207 hp) and 250 N⋅m (184 lb⋅ft) of torque, 280 N⋅m (207 lb⋅ft) with overboost function, from 2,250 to 5,850 rpm. The 0–100 km/h (62 mph) time is 6.8 seconds and top speed is 230 km/h (143 mph).

New upgrades include Brembo brake packages, recalibrated ABS, traction stability management system, Remus exhaust, Bilstein suspension, and a mechanical limited slip differential, which in this segment of cars (supermini/B segment), only the Mini Cooper JCW has.

This Corsa comes with a standard 18-inch alloy wheels and low profile tires, lowered suspension, dual tipped stainless steel exhaust, and special Nurburgring badge at B pillars and inside on gear knob and instrument dials. Also included is a new front spoiler, and different rear bumper. This Corsa is available in Henna Red, Grasshopper Green, Graphite Black (available as matte colour), and Casablanca White.

=== Engines ===
Petrol engines are Family 0 (1.0–1.4) and Family 1 (1.6), and diesel engines are derivative from MultiJet (1.3) and Circle L (1.7).

Petrol engines
Model	Engine	Displacement	Power	Torque	Note	CO_{2} emissions
1.0	I3 Z10XEP	998 cc	60 PS (44 kW; 59 hp) at 5600 rpm	88 N⋅m (65 lb⋅ft) at 3800 rpm	2006–2009	134 g/km
1.2	I4 Z12XEP	1229 cc	80 PS (59 kW; 79 hp) at 5600 rpm	110 N⋅m (81 lb⋅ft) at 4400 rpm	2006–2009	139 g/km
1.4	I4 Z14XEP	1364 cc	90 PS (66 kW; 89 hp) at 5600 rpm	125 N⋅m (92 lb⋅ft) at 4000 rpm	2006–2009	139 g/km
1.6T	I4 Z16LEL	1598 cc	150 PS (110 kW; 148 hp) at 5000 rpm	210 N⋅m (155 lb⋅ft) at 1850–5000 rpm	GSi/SRi	189 g/km
1.6T OPC/VXR	I4 Z16LER	1598 cc	192 PS (141 kW; 189 hp) at 5850 rpm	230 N⋅m (170 lb⋅ft) at 1980–5800 rpm	OPC/VXR	190 g/km
Diesel engines
Model	Engine	Displacement	Power	Torque	Note	CO_{2} emissions
1.3 CDTI	I4 Z13DTJ	1,248 cc	75 PS (55 kW; 74 hp) at 4,000 rpm	170 N⋅m (125 lb⋅ft) at 1,750–2,500 rpm		119 g/km
1.3 CDTI	I4 Z13DTH	1,248 cc	90 PS (66 kW; 89 hp) at 4,000 rpm	200 N⋅m (148 lb⋅ft) at 1,750–2,500 rpm		127 g/km
1.7 CDTI	I4 Z17DTR	1,686 cc	125 PS (92 kW; 123 hp) at 4,000 rpm	280 N⋅m (207 lb⋅ft) at 2,300 rpm		130 g/km

=== Facelift 2010 ===
The Opel Corsa boasted a new petrol and diesel engine line up that fully complies with Euro 5 standards. The ride and handling were also improved. Engines were further improved from 2011 as Start/Stop was added to engines, with all engines expecting to get the technology in the future.

Engines with Start/Stop (S/S) are in bold in CO_{2} column

Petrol engines
Model	Engine	Displacement	Power	Torque	Top speed	0–100 km/h	Note	CO_{2} emissions
1.0 S/S	I3	998 cc	65 PS (48 kW; 64 hp) at 5,300 rpm	90 N⋅m (66 lb⋅ft) at 4,000 rpm	150 km/h	18,2 sec	Twinport	**117 g/km**
1.2 VVT	I4	1,229 cc	85 PS (63 kW; 84 hp) at 5,600 rpm	115 N⋅m (85 lb⋅ft) at 4,400 rpm	168 km/h	13,9 sec		124/129 g/km (2010–); **119 g/km (2011–)**
1.4 VVT	I4	1,398 cc	100 PS (74 kW; 99 hp) at 5,600 rpm	130 N⋅m (96 lb⋅ft) at 4,000 rpm	180 km/h	11,9 sec		129 g/km
1.4 T S/S	I4	1,368 cc	120 PS (88 kW; 118 hp) at 4,800–6,000 rpm	175 N⋅m (129 lb⋅ft) at 1,750–4,800 rpm	195 km/h	10,3 sec	2012–	**129 g/km**
1.6T	I4	1,598 cc	150 PS (110 kW; 148 hp) at 5,000 rpm	210 N⋅m (155 lb⋅ft) at 1,850–5,000 rpm	210 km/h	8,1 sec	GSi	171 g/km
1.6T	I4	1,598 cc	192 PS (141 kW; 189 hp) at 5,850 rpm	230 N⋅m (170 lb⋅ft) at 1,980–5,800 rpm	225 km/h	7,2 sec	OPC/VXR	172 g/km
1.6T	I4	1,598 cc	210 PS (154 kW; 207 hp) at 5,850 rpm	250 N⋅m (184 lb⋅ft) at 2,250–5,850 rpm	230 km/h	6,8 sec	OPC Nürburgring Edition	178 g/km
Diesel engines
Model	Engine	Displacement	Power	Torque			Note	CO_{2} emissions
1.3 CDTI ecoFLEX	I4	1,248 cc	75 PS (55 kW; 74 hp) at 4,000 rpm	190 N⋅m (140 lb⋅ft) at 1,750–2,500 rpm	163 km/h	14,5 sec		112 g/km (2010–); **105 g/km (2011–)**
1.3 CDTI ecoFLEX	I4	1,248 cc	95 PS (70 kW; 94 hp) at 4,000 rpm	210 N⋅m (155 lb⋅ft) at 1,750–2,500 rpm	172 km/h	12,7 sec		115 g/km (2010–); **95 g/km (2011–)**
1.7 CDTI ecoFLEX	I4	1,686 cc	130 PS (96 kW; 128 hp) at 4,000 rpm	300 N⋅m (221 lb⋅ft) at 2,000–2,500 rpm	190 km/h	10,7 sec		118 g/km

=== Hybrid ===
At the 2007 Frankfurt Motor Show, Opel unveiled the Opel Corsa Hybrid Concept, a coupé that combines a belt-driven starter and alternator with a lithium-ion battery.

=== Facelift 2011 ===
In November 2010, a facelift was announced. A revised front end was the most dramatic difference over its predecessor, consisting of a new grille, a restyled front bumper and new 'Eagle Eye' headlamps (introduced on the Insignia) which contain daytime running lamps, standard across the refreshed Corsa range. (Vauxhall versions gained the latest badge from 2008 on the front grille, tailgate and steering wheel). A new 'Touch and Connect' multimedia system from Bosch was made available as an option on certain Corsas, replacing the CD60 unit. Alloy wheels were upgraded on SXI, SE, SRi and OPC/VXR versions. The modified version was available from dealers starting on January 29, 2011.

Production ceased at the end of 2014, when the Adam styled Corsa E was released.

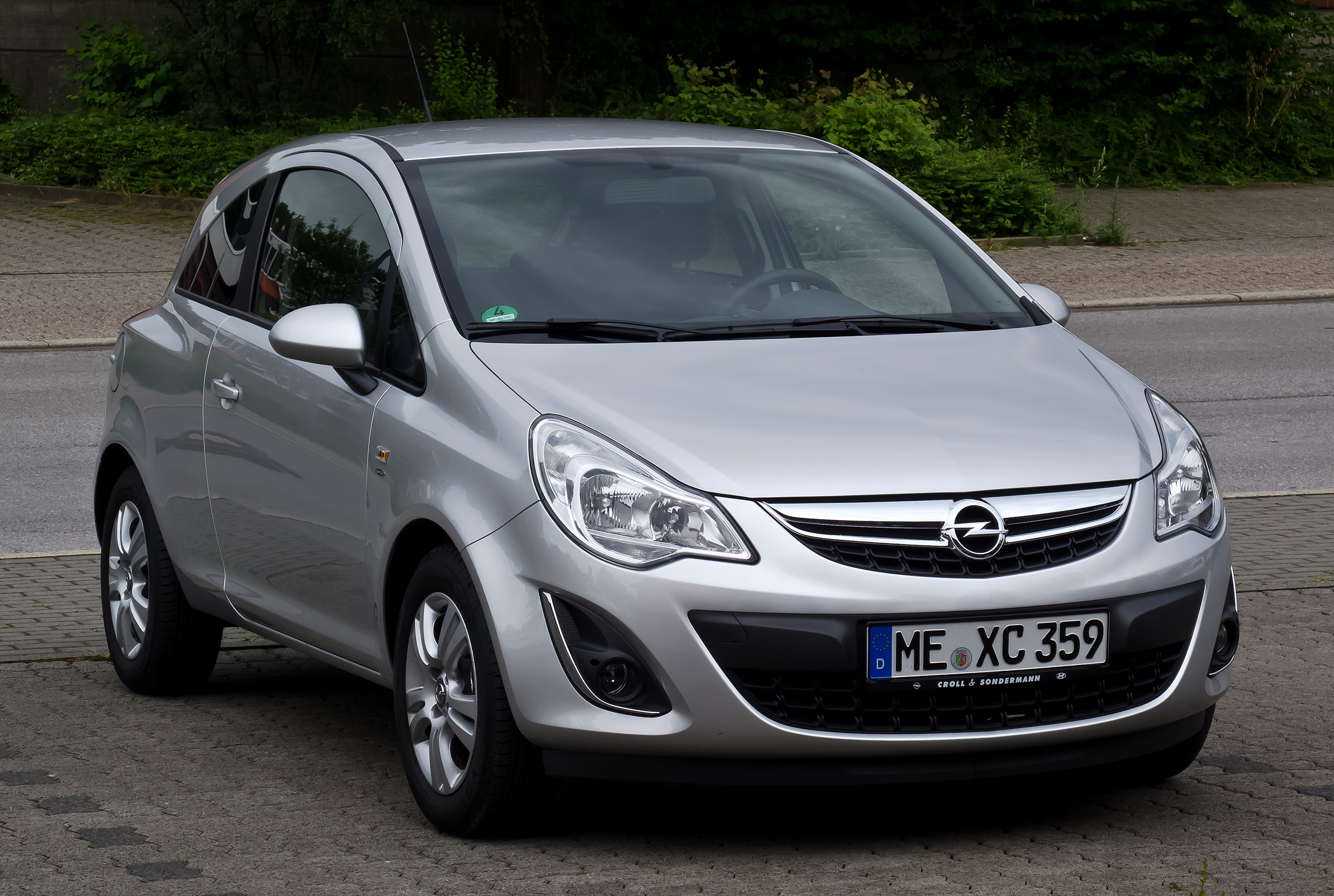
Opel Corsa (three-door)

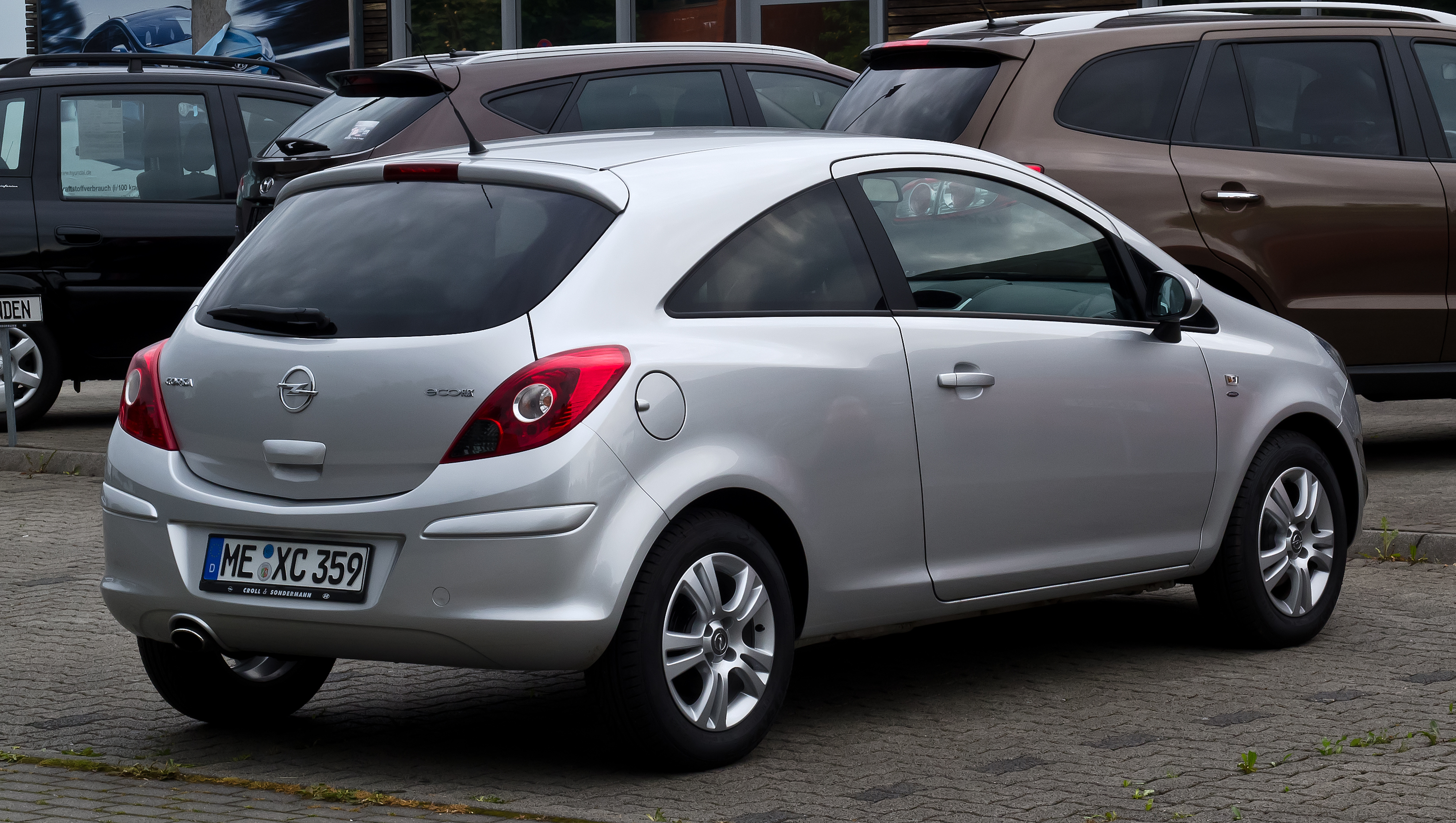
Opel Corsa (three-door)

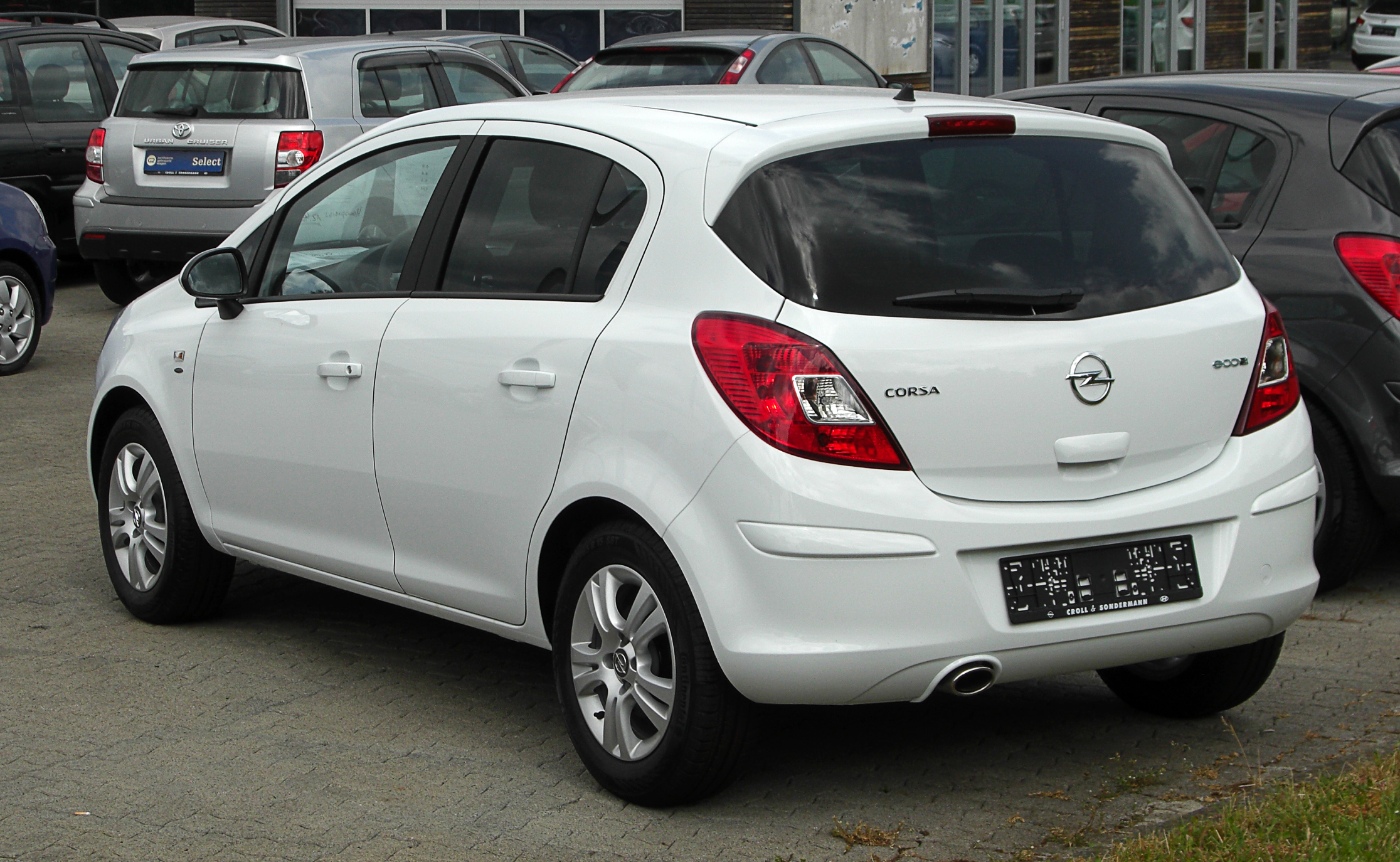
Opel Corsa (five-door)

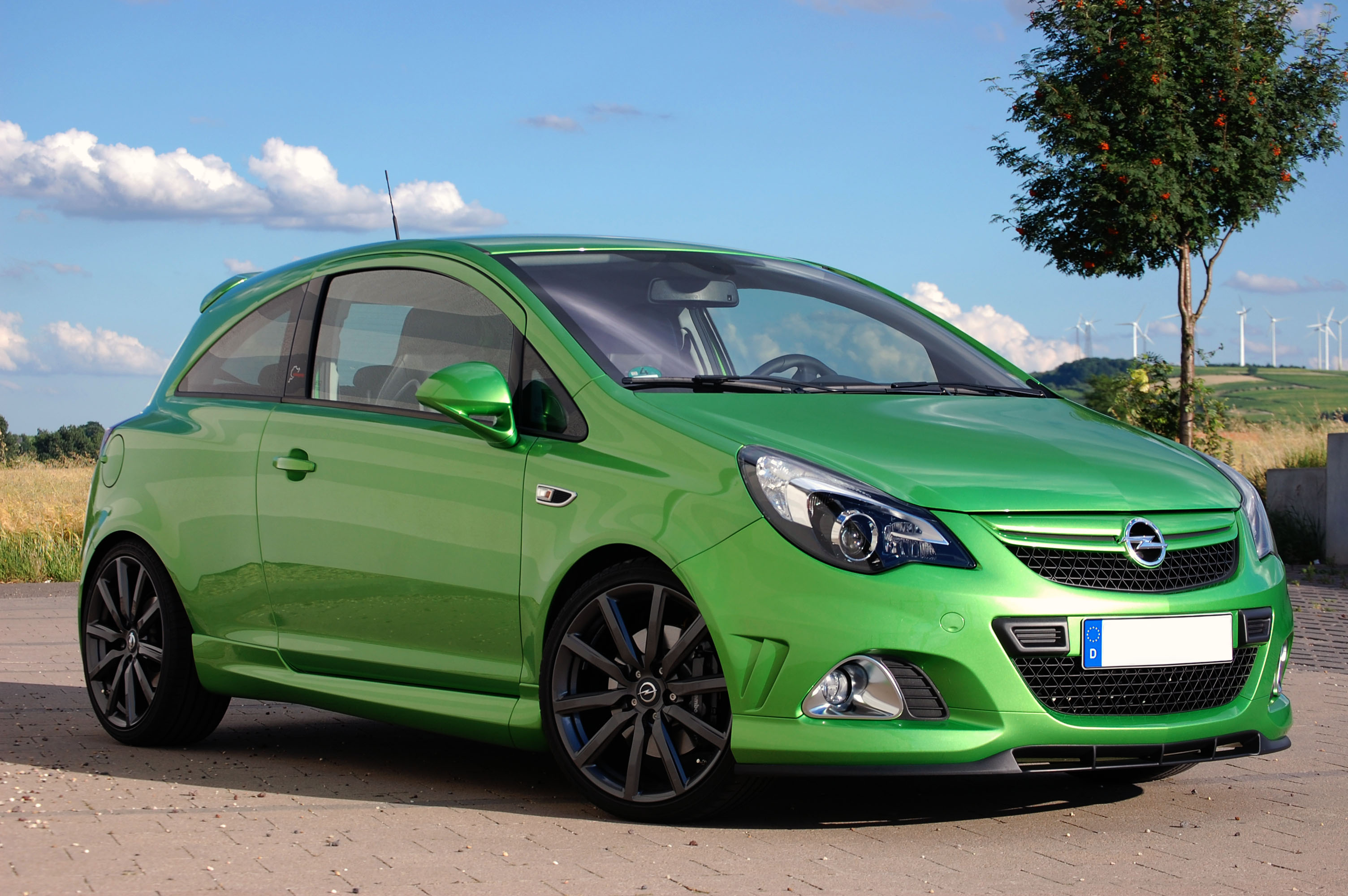
Opel Corsa OPC Nürburgring Edition since 2011

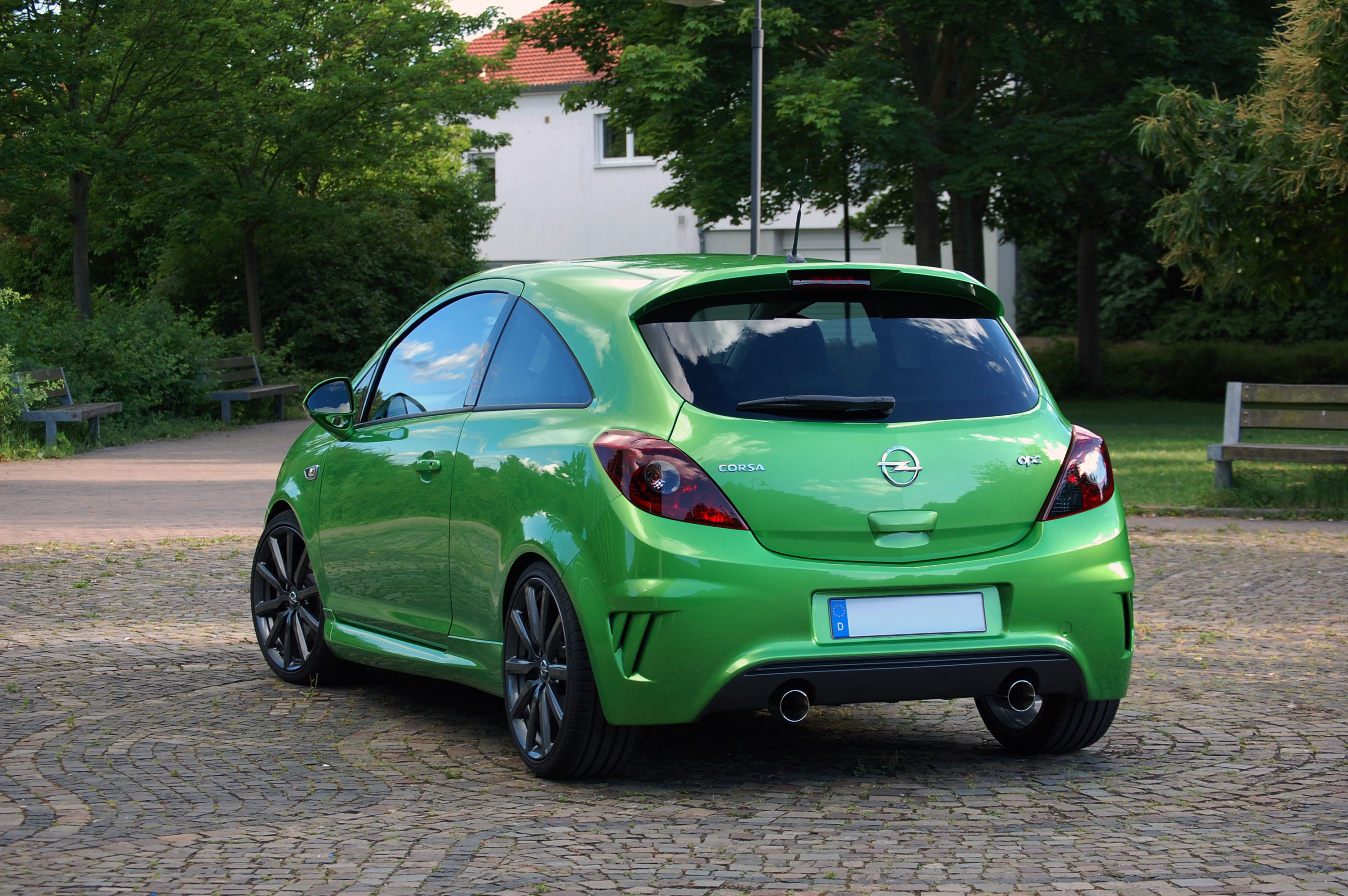
Rear view

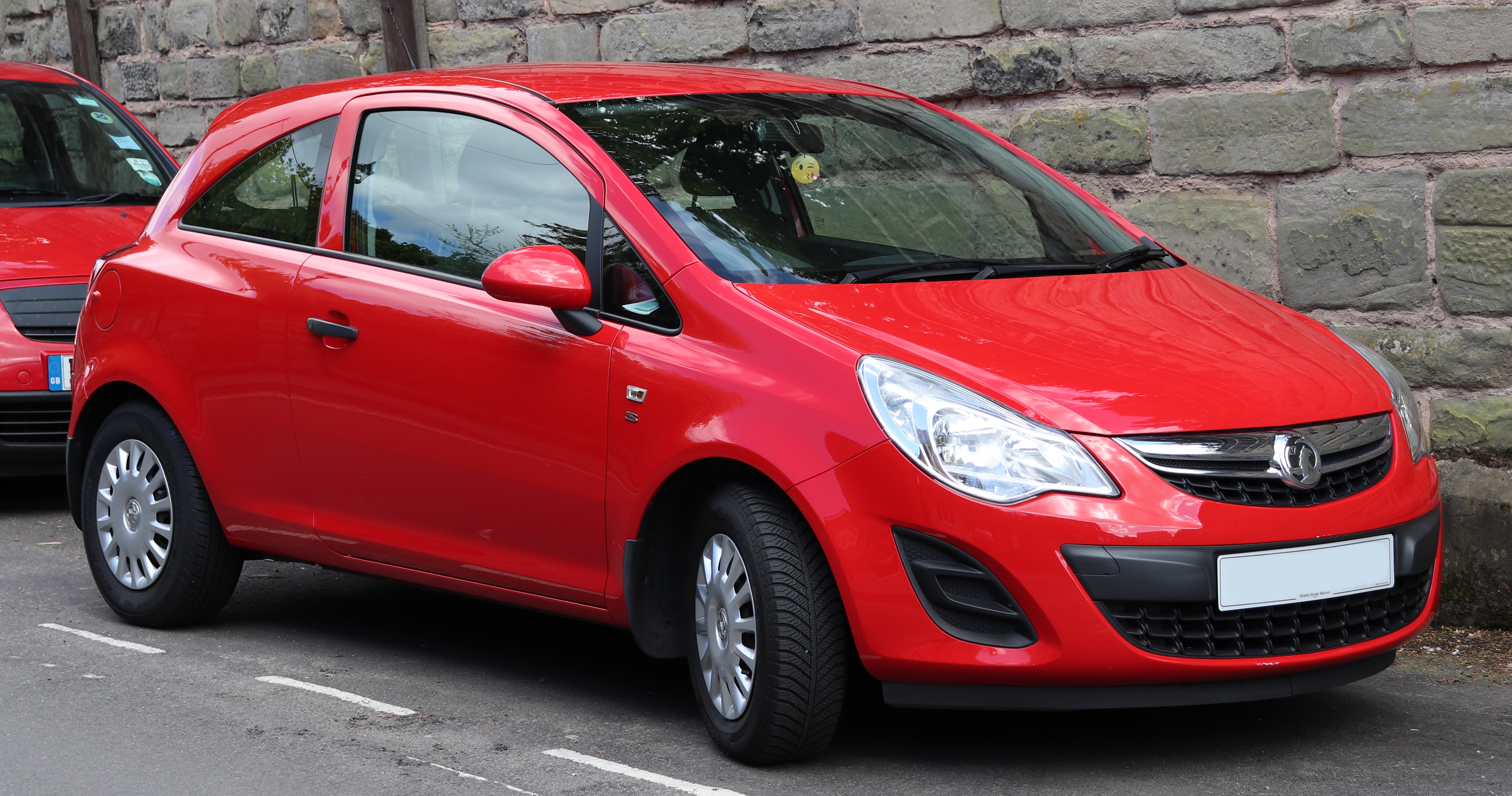
Vauxhall Corsa

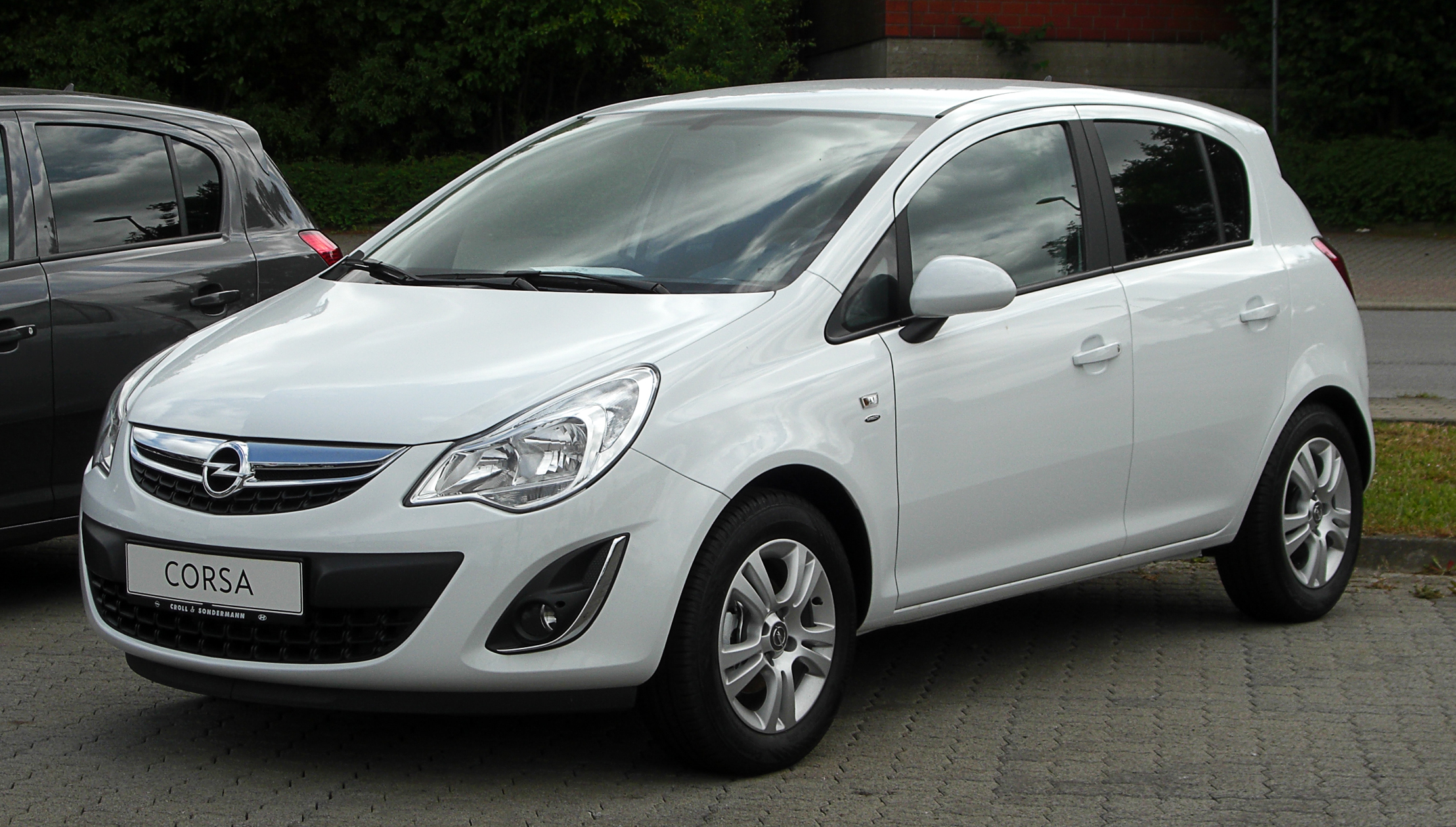
2012 Opel Corsa

== Corsa E (X15; 2014) ==
Corsa E
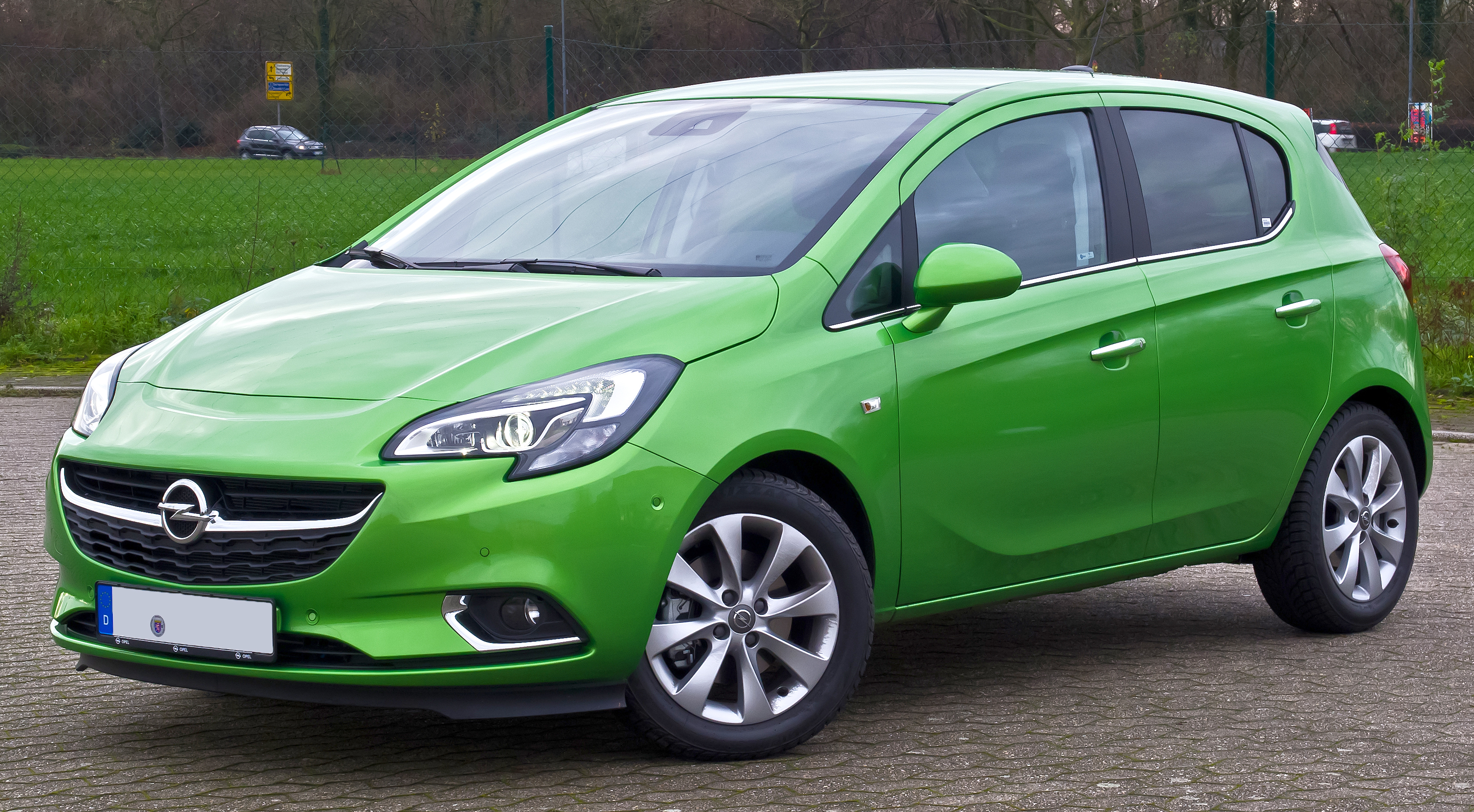

Overview
- Model code: X15
- Also called: Vauxhall Corsa
- Production: 2014–2019
- Assembly: Germany: Eisenach (Opel Eisenach GmbH); Spain: Zaragoza; South Africa: Port Elizabeth (GM South Africa)
- Designer: Carsten Aengenheyster

Body and chassis
- Body style: 3- and 5-door hatchback 3-door car-derived van
- Platform: SCCS platform
- Related: Opel Adam

Powertrain
- Engine: Petrol: 1.0 L B10XFL/XFT turbo I3; 1.2 L A12XEL (LWD) I4; 1.4 L A14XEL (L2Z) I4; 1.4 L A14XFR (L2N) turbo I4; 1.6 L A16LES turbo I4; Diesel: 1.3 L FCA LDV/LSF I4
- Transmission: 5/6-speed manual; 6-speed automatic; 5-speed Easytronic automated manual

Dimensions
- Wheelbase: 2,510 mm (98.8 in)
- Length: 4,021 mm (158.3 in)
- Width: 1,736–1,746 mm (68.3–68.7 in)
- Height: 1,479–1,481 mm (58.2–58.3 in)
- Curb weight: 1,120–1,237 kg (2,469–2,727 lb)

The Corsa E debuted at the 2014 Paris Motor Show.

Interior space stayed the same, as did the 285-litre boot, but the interior was completely new. All of the exterior sheet metal (except the roof) was revised, but the underlying chassis and body structure, the glasshouse, as well as some minor parts such as side-view mirrors and turn signal repeaters, were carried over from the Corsa D.

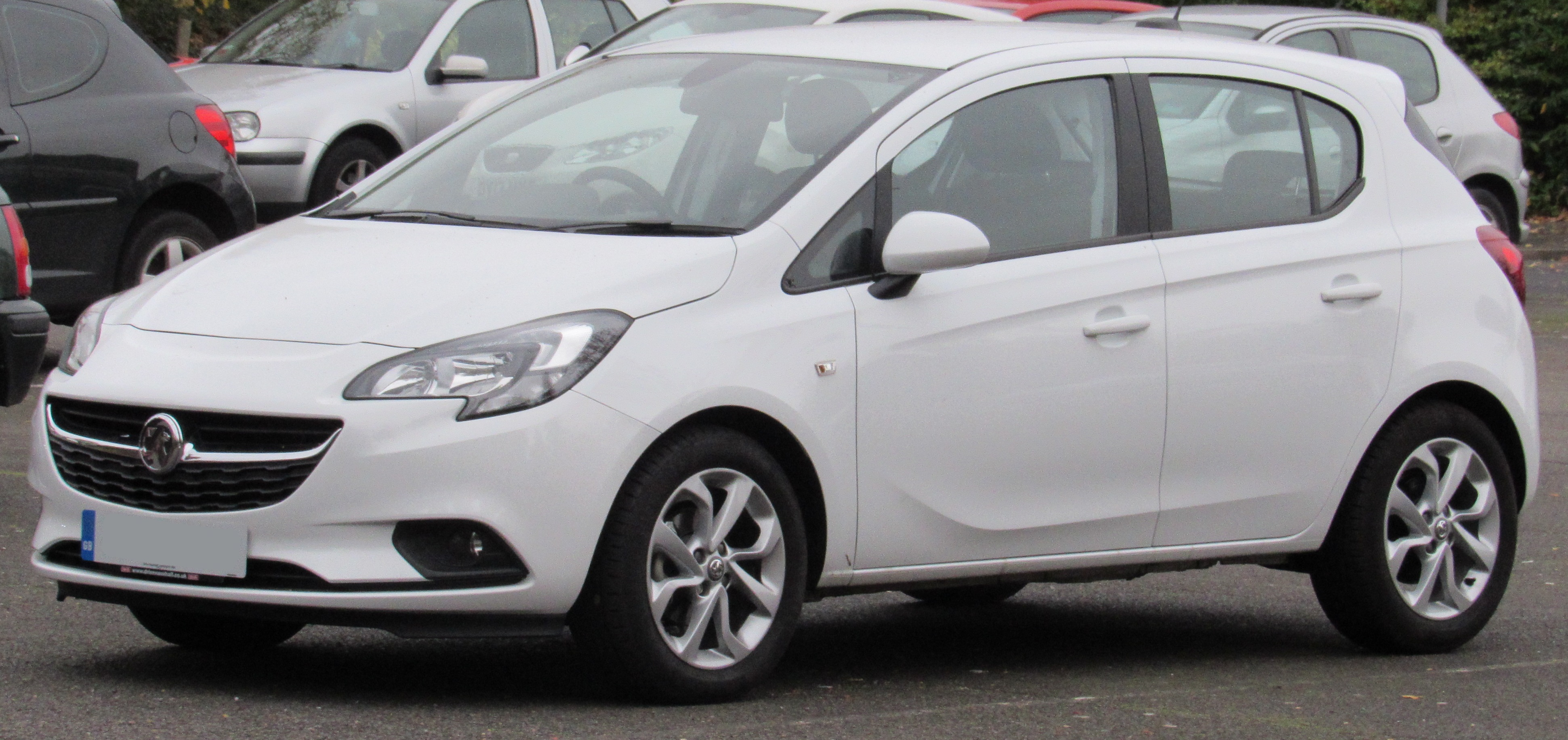
Vauxhall Corsa Mk IV

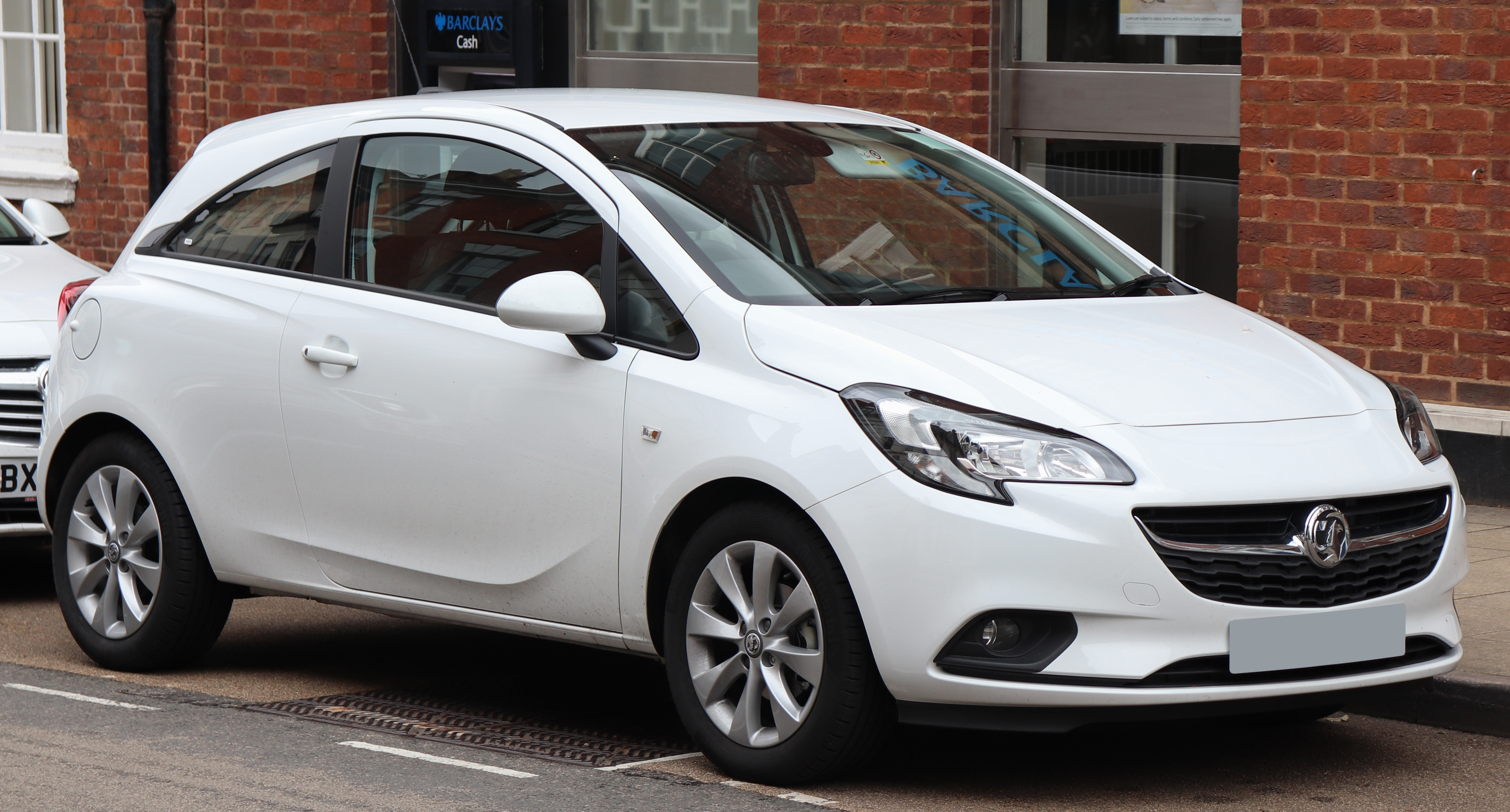
Vauxhall Corsa Mk IV (3-door)

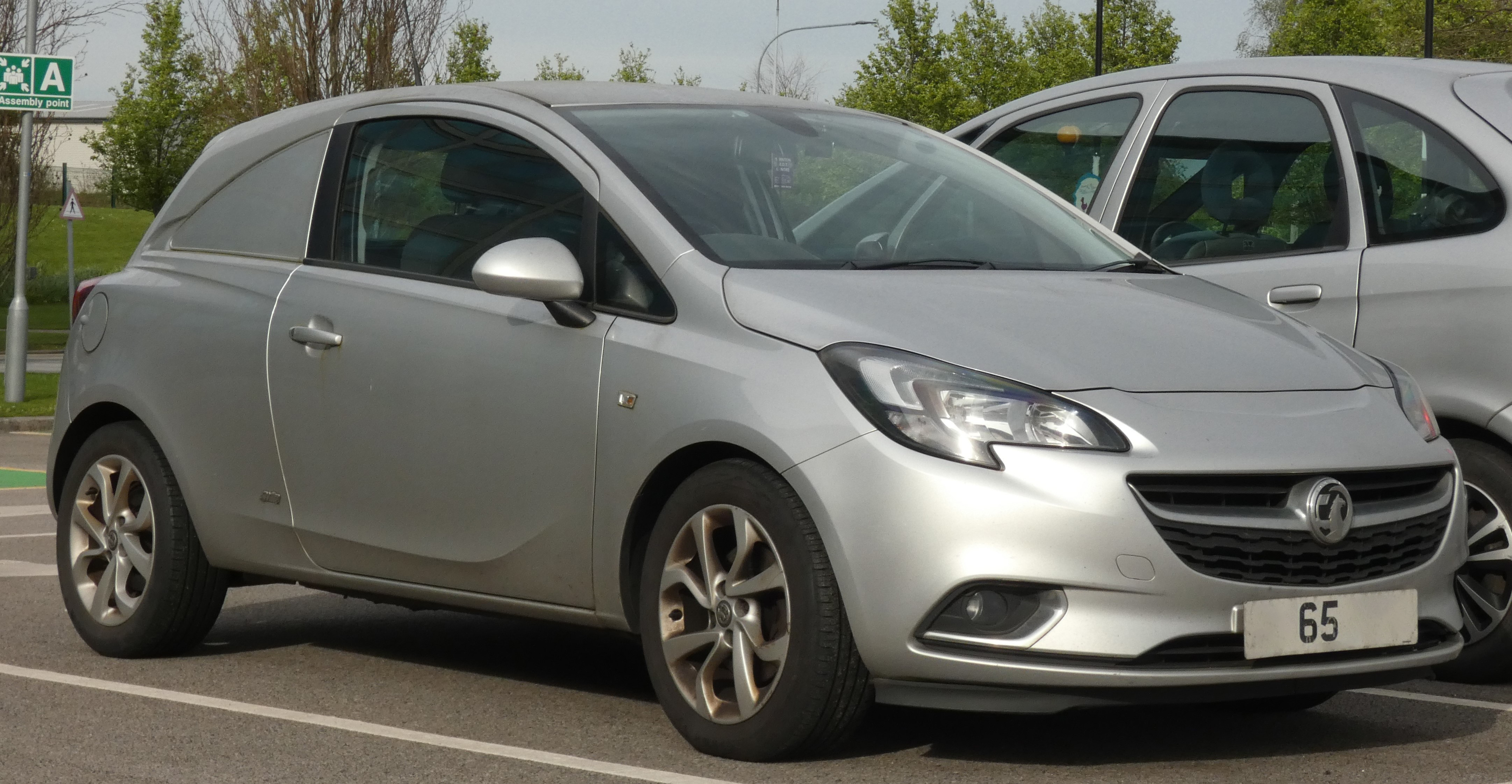
Vauxhall Corsavan Mk IV

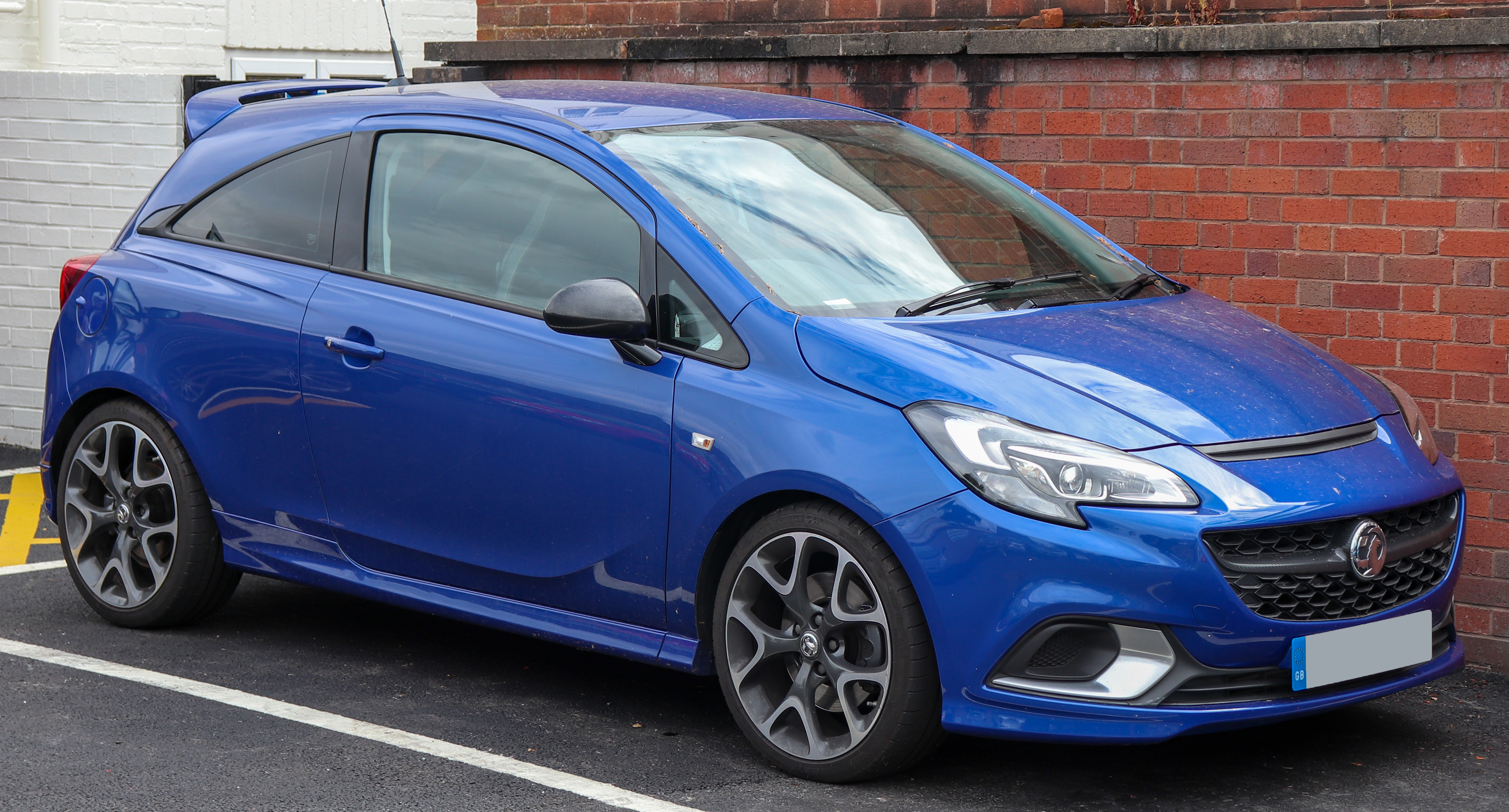
Vauxhall Corsa Mk IV VXR

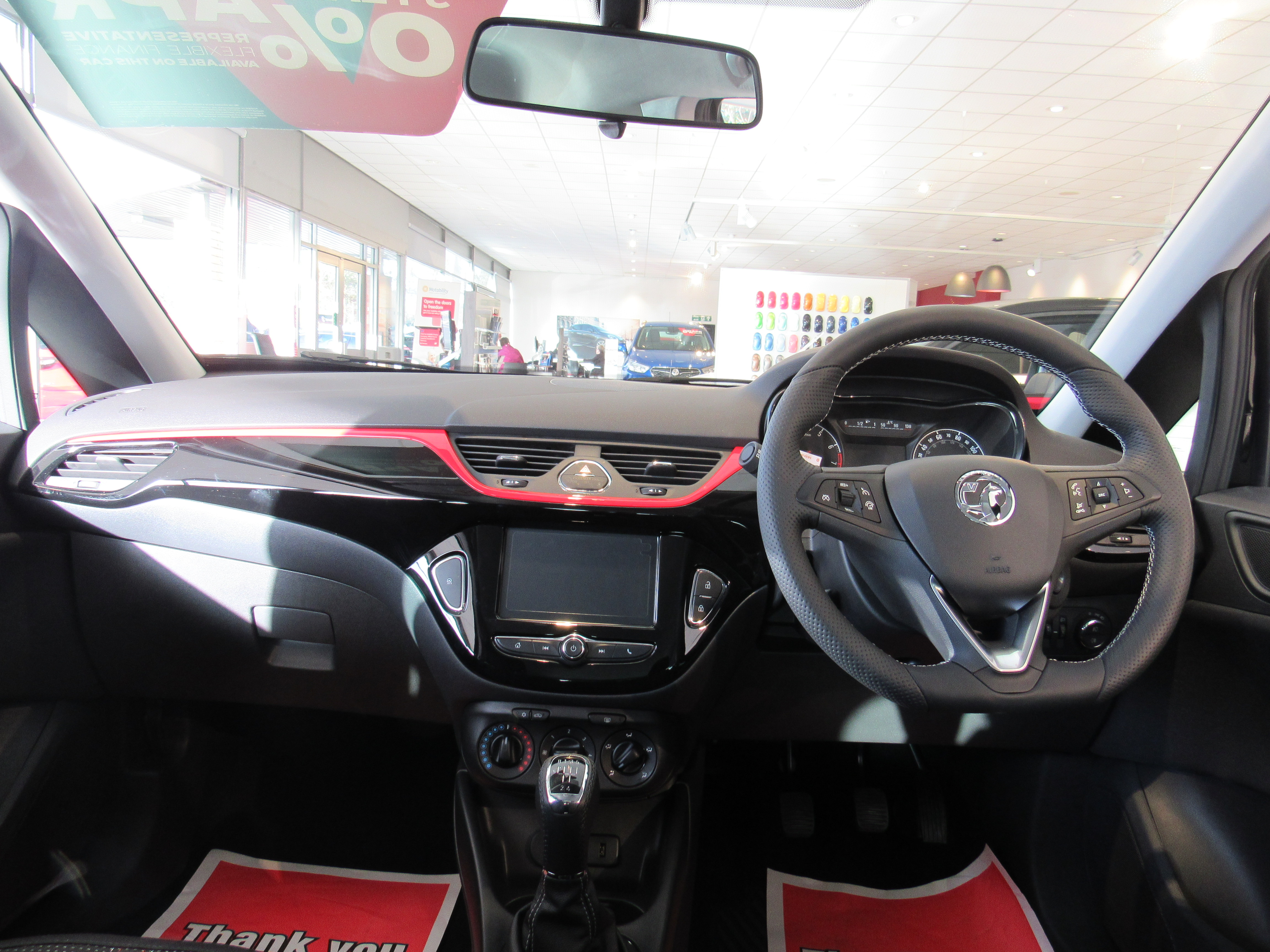
Vauxhall Corsa Mk IV Interior

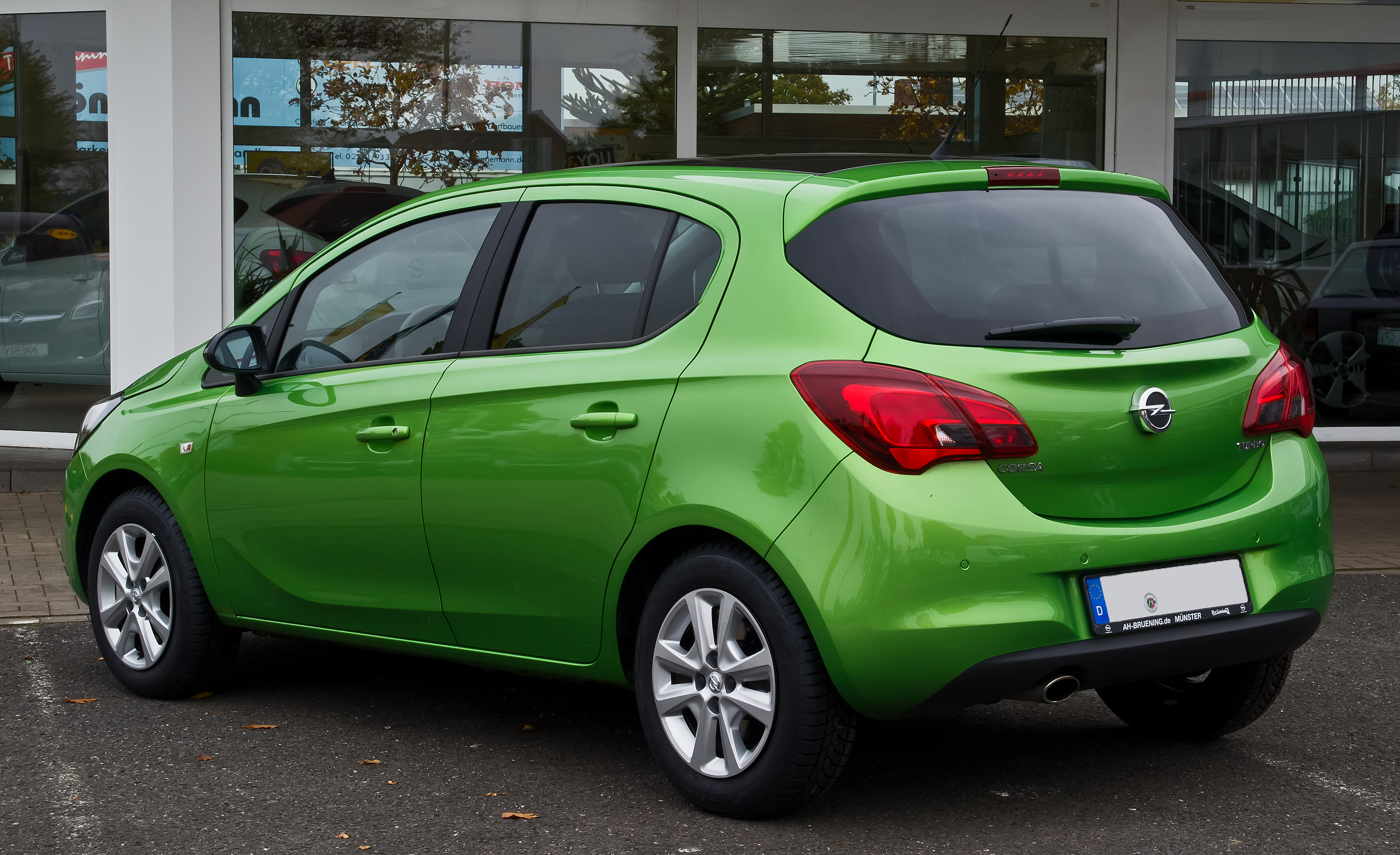
Opel Corsa E 1.4 Turbo ecoFLEX (rear view)

=== Corsa OPC/VXR ===
In February 2015, Opel introduced OPC version of Corsa E. Compared to the previous generation model, power output had increased by 15 PS (15 bhp) to 207 PS (204 bhp) from 1.6 Turbo engine, with a maximum torque of 245 N⋅m (181 lb⋅ft) between 1900 and 5800 rpm. An overboost function increased torque to 280 N⋅m (207 lb⋅ft) when needed. As a result, the Corsa OPC was able to accelerate from 0 to 100 km/h (0 to 62 mph) in 6.8 seconds and to reach a maximum speed of 230 km/h (143 mph).

The Corsa OPC featured a sports chassis with Frequency Selective Damping (FSD) technology, which enabled the damping forces to adapt to the frequency of the car to balance sportiness with comfort. The suspension was lowered by 10 mm (0.39 in) compared to standard Corsa models, and the car also received an optimised steering system with more direct and precise reactions. OPC also worked on the brakes, adding 308 mm (12.13 in) discs on the front axle.

Opel also offered the Corsa OPC Performance Package, which included a mechanical multi-disc differential lock made by Drexler, 18-inch wheels with Michelin tires, and an even more athletic chassis set up. The package also brought a Brembo high-performance braking system with 330mm braking discs on the front axle.

Styling-wise, the Corsa OPC/VXR received more aggressive body kits with new bumpers, aluminium frames for the fog lights, a small scoop in the hood, a big roof spoiler, and twin-pipe Remus exhaust with a diffuser. Inside, the Recaro performance seats took centre stage, with other upgrades including the flat-bottomed leather steering wheel, OPC gear knob, and sports pedals, as well as OPC design instruments.

=== Engines ===
Under the bonnet, all new 1.0-litre three-cylinder ECOTEC engine – the direct-injection turbo offered 90 PS or 115 PS – both giving 170Nm of torque – with a six-speed manual 'box, while a new six-speed auto was optional on selected engines. Start/Stop tech as standard and, in three-door guise, the lower-powered model could hit sub-100g/km CO_{2} emissions.

The entry-level engine was a 70 PS 1.2-litre petrol, while turbo and non-turbo 1.4s offered 100 PS and 90 PS respectively. The 1.3 CDTI continued with 75PS, now hitting as little as 85g/km CO_{2} emissions, and was capable of 3.2 L/100 km economy. An ecoFLEX version was available from launch, too, with target CO_{2} emissions of under 85g/km.

Petrol engines
Model	Engine	Displacement	Power	Torque	Note	CO_{2} emissions
1.0T SIDI S/S	I3	999 cc	90 PS (66 kW; 89 hp) at 3700–6000 rpm	170 N⋅m (125 lb⋅ft) at 1800–3700 rpm		102–100 g/km
1.0T SIDI S/S	I3	999 cc	115 PS (85 kW; 113 hp) at 5000–6000 rpm	170 N⋅m (125 lb⋅ft) at 1800–4500 rpm		115–114 g/km
1.2	I4	1229 cc	70 PS (51 kW; 69 hp) at 5600 rpm	115 N⋅m (85 lb⋅ft) at 4000 rpm	Only Available for short time after release in hatchbacks then the engine was dropped in 2018	126–124 g/km
1.4	I4	1398 cc	90 PS (66 kW; 89 hp) at 6000 rpm	130 N⋅m (96 lb⋅ft) at 4000 rpm		114–129 g/km
1.4 Turbo	I4	1364 cc	100 PS (74 kW; 99 hp) at 3500–6000 rpm	200 N⋅m (148 lb⋅ft) at 1850–3500 rpm		122–119 g/km
1.6 Turbo (B16LER)	I4	1598 cc	207 PS (152 kW; 204 hp) at 5850 rpm	245 N⋅m (181 lb⋅ft) (overboost 280 (207)) at 1900–5800 rpm	OPC/VXR	174 g/km
Diesel engines
Model	Engine	Displacement	Power	Torque	Note	CO_{2} emissions
1.3 CDTI S/S	I4	1248 cc	75 PS (55 kW; 74 hp) at 3750 rpm	190 N⋅m (140 lb⋅ft) at 1500–2500 rpm		100–99 g/km
1.3 CDTI S/S	I4	1248 cc	95 PS (70 kW; 94 hp) at 3750 rpm	190 N⋅m (140 lb⋅ft) at 1500–2500 rpm		82–101 g/km

=== Safety ===
Euro NCAP test results* Opel/Vauxhall Corsa 1.4 'Enjoy' (LHD) (2014)
Test	Points	%
Overall:	4 /5 stars	
Adult occupant:	30.3	79%
Child occupant:	38	77%
Pedestrian:	25.6	71%
Safety assist:	7.3	56%

== Corsa F (P2JO; 2019) ==
Corsa F
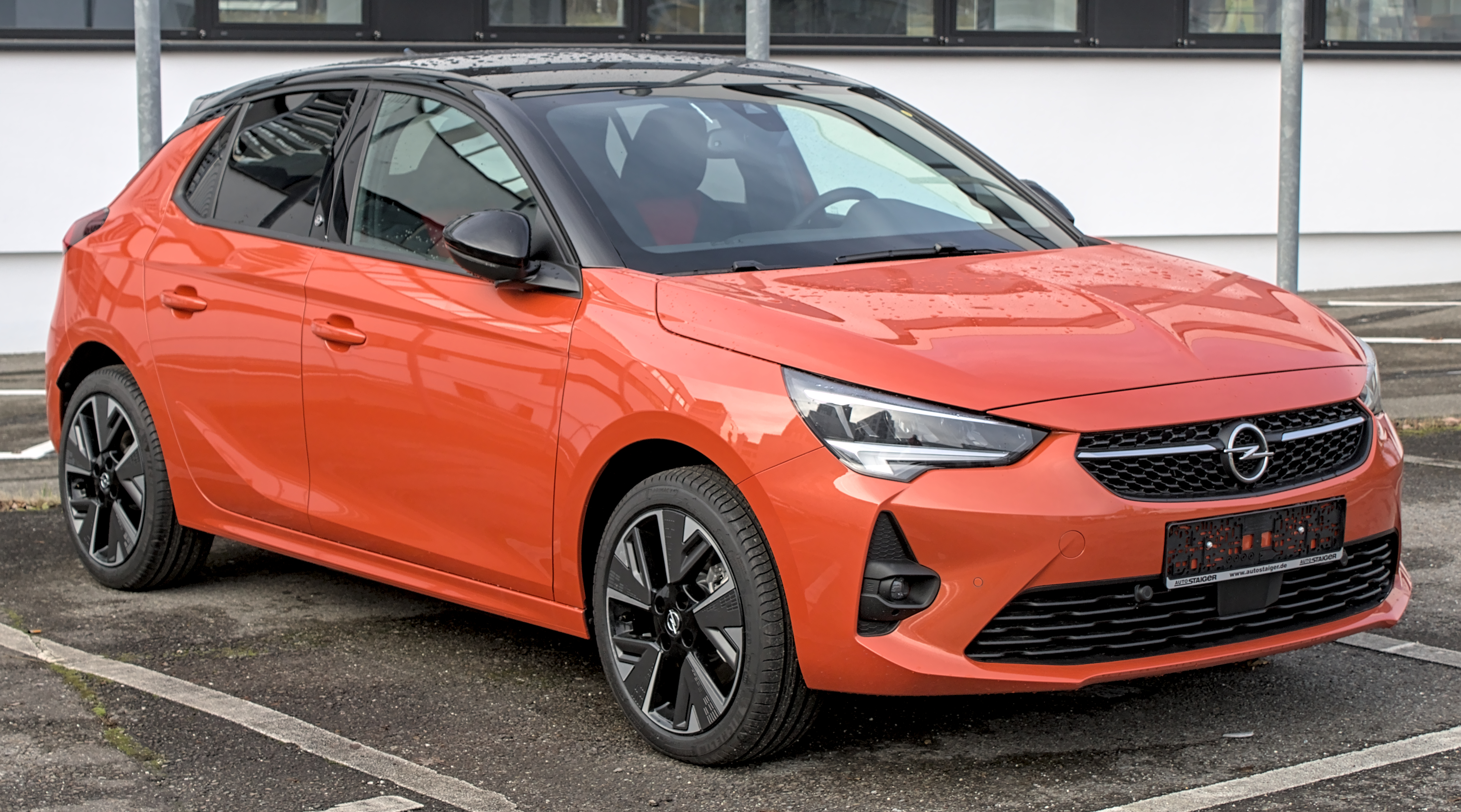

Overview
- Model code: P2JO
- Also called: Vauxhall Corsa
- Production: June/August 2019–present
- Assembly: Spain: Zaragoza (Opel Zaragoza)
- Designer: Martin Schaufler (exterior)

Body and chassis
- Body style: 5-door hatchback
- Platform: PSA CMP (EMP1) platform
- Related: Peugeot 208; Opel Mokka B Lancia Ypsilon IV

Powertrain
- Engine: Petrol: 1.2 L EB2FA I3; 1.2 L EB2ADTD/EB2ADTS turbo I3; Petrol hybrid: 1.2 EB2LTEDH2 Turbo I3; Diesel: 1.5 L DV5 BlueHDi I4
- Electric motor: Permanent Magnet Synchronous Motor (Corsa-e)
- Transmission: 5-speed PSA MA manual; 6-speed PSA MB6 manual; 8-speed Aisin AWF8F automatic; 6 speed PSA e-DCT (Hybrid); 1-speed fixed gear ratio (Corsa-e)
- Hybrid drivetrain: Mild-Hybrid
- Battery: 0.43kWh (Hybrid) 50 kWh (Corsa-e)
- Electric range: 330 km (210 mi)

Dimensions
- Wheelbase: 2,538 mm (99.9 in)
- Length: 4,060 mm (159.8 in)
- Width: 1,765 mm (69.5 in)
- Height: 1,435 mm (56.5 in)
- Kerb weight: 980–1,090 kg (2,161–2,403 lb)

Chronology
- Predecessor: Opel Adam; Opel Karl; Opel Ampera-e (electric version)

The original project of Corsa F (project code: G2J0) was initially planned to be released in the third quarter of 2017 on a GM platform, the G2XX. However, the G2J0 project was cancelled due to PSA Group's acquisition of Opel and Vauxhall, with the cancelled project reaching production in a saloon form as the Buick Excelle in China. Development was then restarted after switching to the PSA CMP (EMP1) platform in 2017. The Corsa is thus the first of the Opel/Vauxhall models developed under the PSA ownership. The Corsa F was unveiled at the 2019 Frankfurt Motor Show.

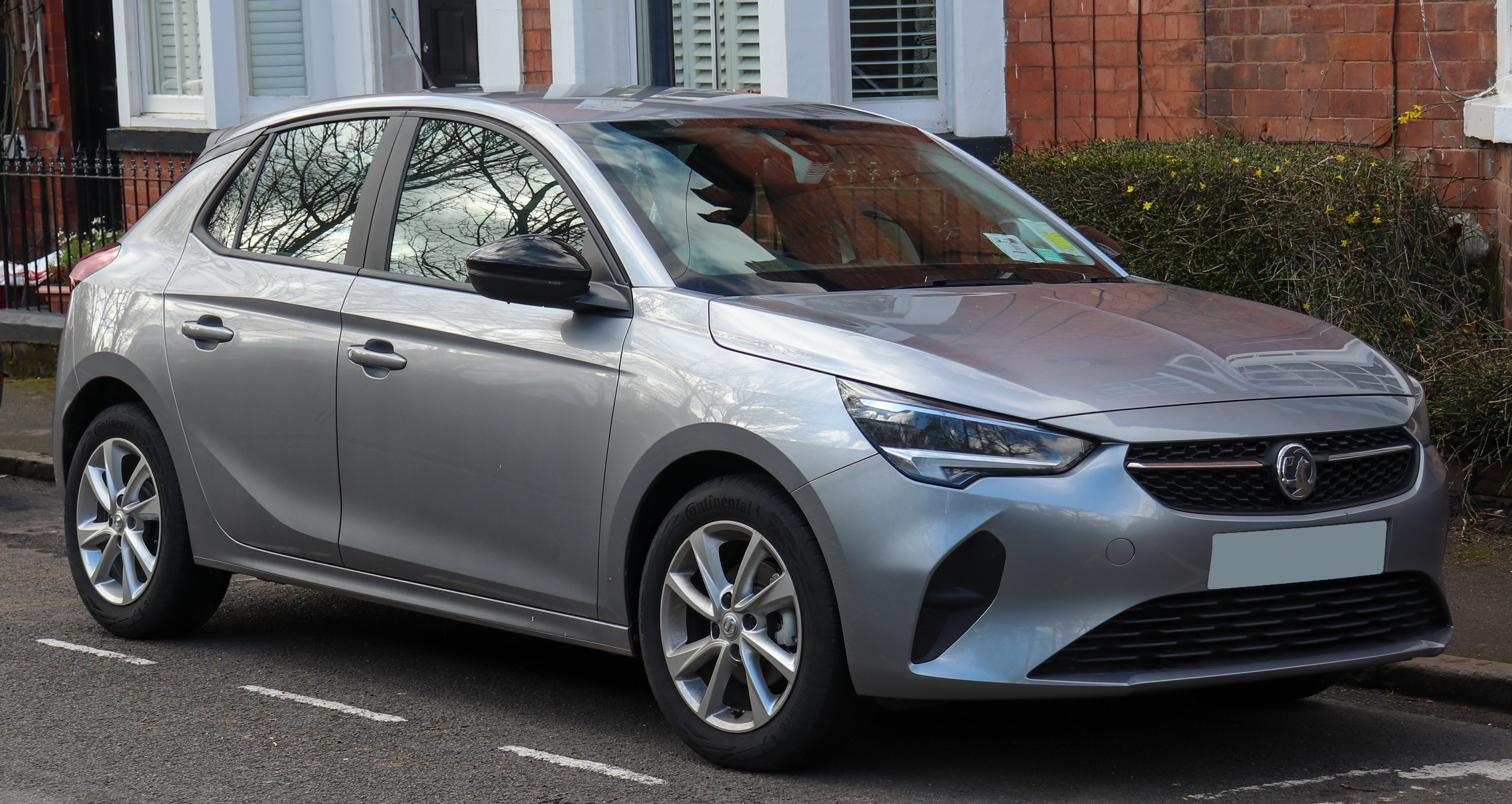
Vauxhall Corsa (pre-facelift)

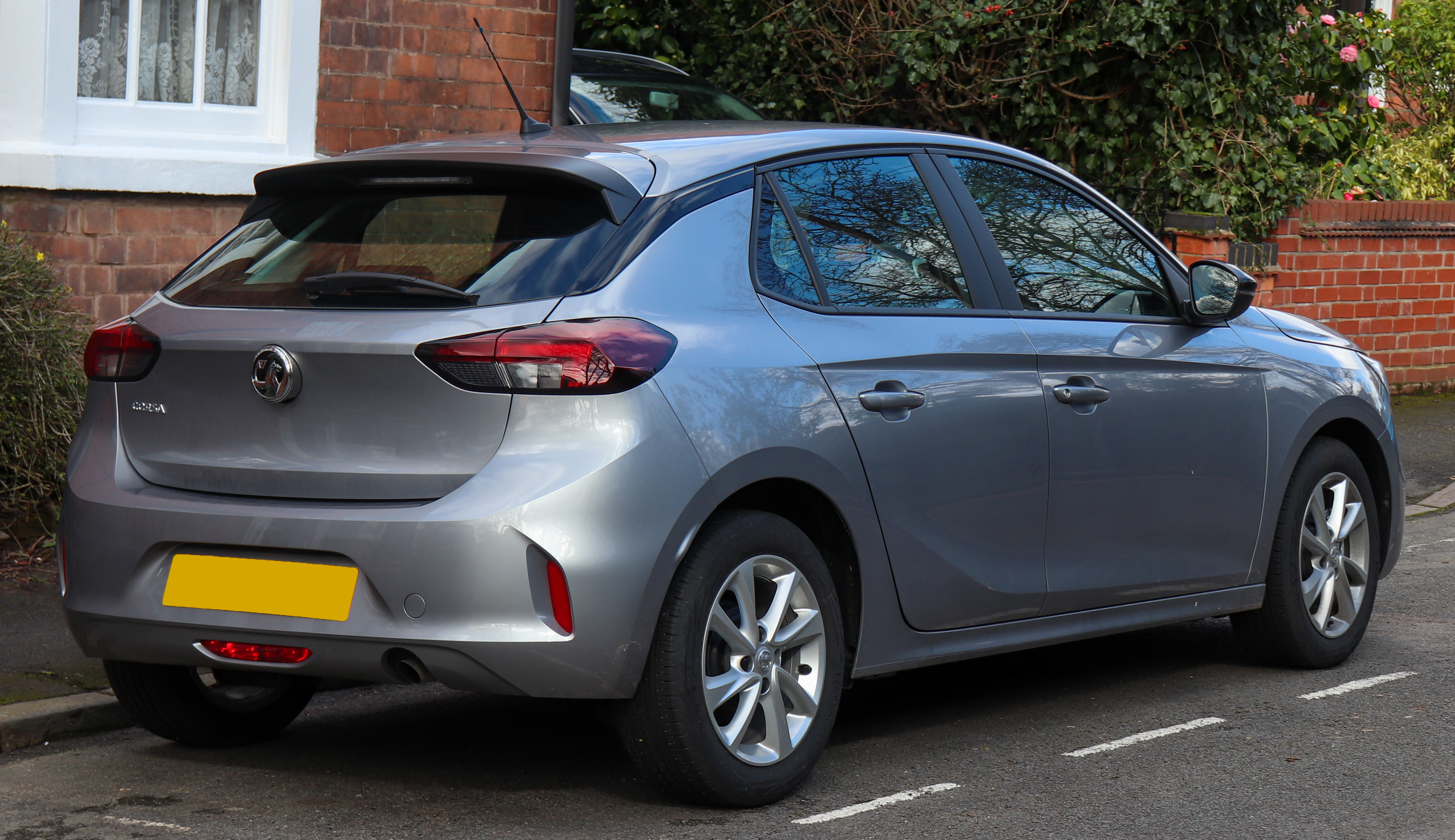
Rear view (pre-facelift)

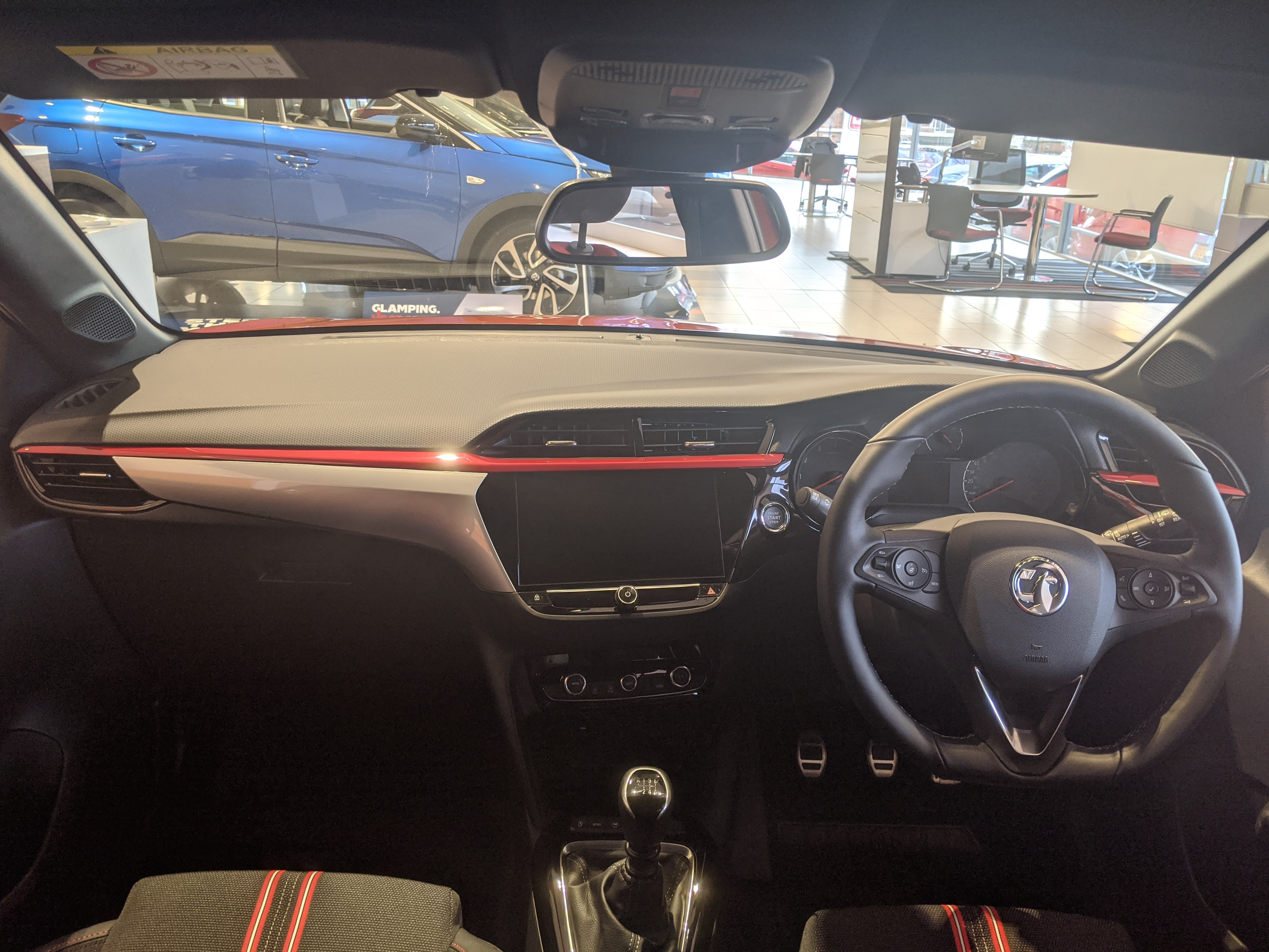
Interior (Vauxhall Corsa; pre-facelift)

=== Corsa-e ===
In December 2018, Opel announced the launch of an electric version of the Corsa, called the Corsa-e, which was originally planned to go on sale in 2019, but was delayed into the second quarter of 2020. In the UK, the Corsa-e is sold under the Vauxhall marque. The main competitors to the Corsa-e were expected to be the Nissan Leaf and the Renault Zoe, as well as its mechanically identical twin, the Peugeot e-208.

The Corsa-e has the same two drivetrain options as the e-208. In the weaker one of the two (and the only option initially available), the electric motor produces 136 PS (100 kW; 134 hp) and 260 N⋅m (192 lb⋅ft) of torque, and a 0–100 km/h (62 mph) acceleration takes 8.1 seconds. Output is restricted in the Normal, 81 kW (109 hp) and 220 N⋅m (162 lb⋅ft), and Eco modes, 60 kW (81 hp) and 180 N⋅m (133 lb⋅ft)) modes. A more powerful, 156 PS (115 kW) option became available later.

Under the WLTP driving cycle, the 2019 Corsa-e had an estimated range of 330 km (210 mi) using a 50.0 kW-hr battery (gross), which is carried in the floor. Real-world testing showed the actual efficiency was 3.1 to 3.7 mi (5.0 to 6.0 km) per kW-hr, yielding a range of 145–190 mi (233–306 km) considering the 46 kW-hr usable battery capacity. Over a six-month test, CAR observed an efficiency of 3.9 mi (6.3 km) per kW-hr, slightly less than the claimed 4.18 mi (6.73 km) per kW-hr.

The manufacturer later added a larger-battery option, increasing its capacity from 50/45 kWh (gross/net capacity) to 54/51 kWh. This larger battery is only available with the 156-hp motor. The manufacturer claims that, combined with improvements to the drivetrain efficiency, it increased the WLTP range to 429 km (267 mi). A range test of its sibling, the e-208 with the same upgrades, achieved 414 km (257 mi) when driven at constant 90 km/h in good weather conditions.

Compared to the conventionally-powered Corsa, the Corsa-e is 345 kg (761 lb) heavier at a kerb weight (for the base model) of 1,455 kg (3,208 lb); the center of gravity is lower by 57 mm (2 in) for the Corsa-e. Boot space shrinks from 309 to 267 L (10.9 to 9.4 ft^{3}) for the electric version as well. Externally, the standard Corsa F is almost identical to the electric version, with the exception of different alloy wheel designs and the lack of exhaust. The interior will include a touchscreen infotainment system with two set-ups available; seven-inch Multimedia Navi system or 10-inch Multimedia Navi Pro (exclusive to the top-level Elite Premium trim).

Interior styling and controls generally are simpler than the e-208. In the UK, the Corsa-e is sold in four trim levels (from base Griffin through SE Premium, SRi Premium, and Elite Premium). Starting price was £30,665, which was reduced to £27,165 with applied government grants.

=== Powertrain ===
The Corsa F supermini marks the arrival of new petrol and diesel engines as well as an all-electric Corsa-e into the range. Two petrol engines and one diesel engine are available, starting with the 1.2-litre three-cylinder engine that produces 75 bhp and comes with a five-speed manual gearbox as standard. Sitting above is a three-cylinder 1.2-litre turbo PureTech engine which is shared with Peugeot and Citroën models and produces 99 bhp and 205 Nm of torque. It comes with a six-speed manual or eight-speed automatic gearbox option. The diesel engine is a BlueHDi 1.5-litre four-cylinder diesel, producing 99 PS (73 kW) and 250 N⋅m (184 lb⋅ft) of torque.

Weight of the car is also improved, with lightweight underpinnings, redesigned bodyshell and new aluminium engines which Opel claims 10 percent of kerb weight have been reduced across the range and will have a good balance between sportiness and comfort. The body is constructed from a range of high-strength steels, saving a total of 40 kg over the seventh-generation model. A new aluminium bonnet will also replace the previous generation's steel unit, saving a further 2.4 kg. However, the Corsa is slightly larger than its predecessor, with a larger body and longer wheelbase to allocate more interior and boot space.

Opel's latest range of aluminium three-cylinder petrol and diesel engines are projected to save around 15 kg over the predecessor four-cylinder units. 10 kg has been reduced off the seats, losing 5.5 kg at the front and 4.5 kg at the rear, totalling around 108 kg of weight reduction.

In June 2019 it was revealed that first deliveries were scheduled to start in April 2020, while the pure-electric model was planned to follow at a time that has not yet been announced.

The below engine list is based on price lists from Vauxhall since the vehicle's launch.

Petrol engines						
Model	Engine	Displacement	Power	Torque	CO_{2} emissions	Years
1.2	I3	1199 cc	75 PS (55 kW; 74 hp) at 5750 rpm	118 N⋅m (87 lb⋅ft) at 2750 rpm	125 - 133 g/km	2019 - 2024
1.2 Turbo	I3	1199 cc	100 PS (74 kW; 99 hp) at 5000 rpm	205 N⋅m (151 lb⋅ft) at 1750 rpm	Manual: 125 - 134 g/km	2019 -
1.2 Turbo	I3	1199 cc	100 PS (74 kW; 99 hp) at 5000 rpm	205 N⋅m (151 lb⋅ft) at 1750 rpm	Auto: 133 - 140 g/km	2020 -
1.2 Turbo	I3	1199 cc	130 PS (96 kW; 128 hp) at 5500 rpm	230 N⋅m (170 lb⋅ft) at 1750 rpm	123 - 136 g/km	2019 -
1.2 Turbo Hybrid	I3	1199 cc	110 PS (81 kW; 108 hp) at 5500 rpm	205 N⋅m (151 lb⋅ft) at 1750 rpm	103 - 105 g/km	2024 -
1.2 Turbo Hybrid	I3	1199 cc	145 PS (107 kW; 143 hp) at 5500 rpm	230 N⋅m (170 lb⋅ft) at 1750 rpm	106 g/km	2024 -
Diesel engine						
Model	Engine	Displacement	Power	Torque	CO_{2} emissions	
1.5 D	I4	1499 cc	102 PS (75 kW; 101 hp) at 3500 rpm	250 N⋅m (184 lb⋅ft) at 1750 rpm	108 - 117 g/km	2019 - 2022
Electric (Corsa-e)						
Battery capacity			Power	Torque	All-electric range	
50 kWh			136 PS (100 kW; 134 hp)	205 N⋅m (151 lb⋅ft)	330 km (205 mi)	2024 -
50 kWh			136 PS (100 kW; 134 hp)	260 N⋅m (192 lb⋅ft)	330 km (205 mi)	2019 - 2024
51 kWh			156 PS (115 kW; 154 hp)	260 N⋅m (192 lb⋅ft)	428 km (266 mi)	2023 -

=== Recalls ===
On 11 May 2020, Opel recalled Corsas manufactured between 25 September and 30 December 2019 because the steering column was not manufactured according to the specifications, causing steering failure and leading to the car losing control, increasing the risk of an accident.

On 6 November 2020, Opel Corsas manufactured between 18 March 2019 and 14 February 2020 were recalled due to the high-pressure pump not being tightened to the engine with correct torque, causing a potential fuel leak.

=== Facelift ===
A facelift was unveiled on 24 May 2023, featuring a new front fascia features the brand's Visor front end, new exterior colours, a new steering wheel, new shifter for automatic transmission, new seat designs, updated technology and powertrains.

In December 2023, Opel announced that the Corsa facelift model could also be ordered in 48V mild-hybrid versions. The assembly is composed of a 1.2-litre gasoline engine, available in 100 and 136 PS versions, a new electrified 6-speed dual-clutch transmission and a 0.4 kWh battery. The electric motor, with 28 HP and 55 Nm, is integrated into the new gearbox. These vehicles are marketed as 110/145PS respectively.

In April 2024, the new Corsa YES was released, with the tagline "Yes, Of Corsa". It is priced below the entry-level model. Each year since has had its own unique variant of the Corsa YES, with new colour options:

2024	2025	2026
Record Red	Kiss Red	Coral Orange
	Cobalt Blue	
	Eucalyptus Green	

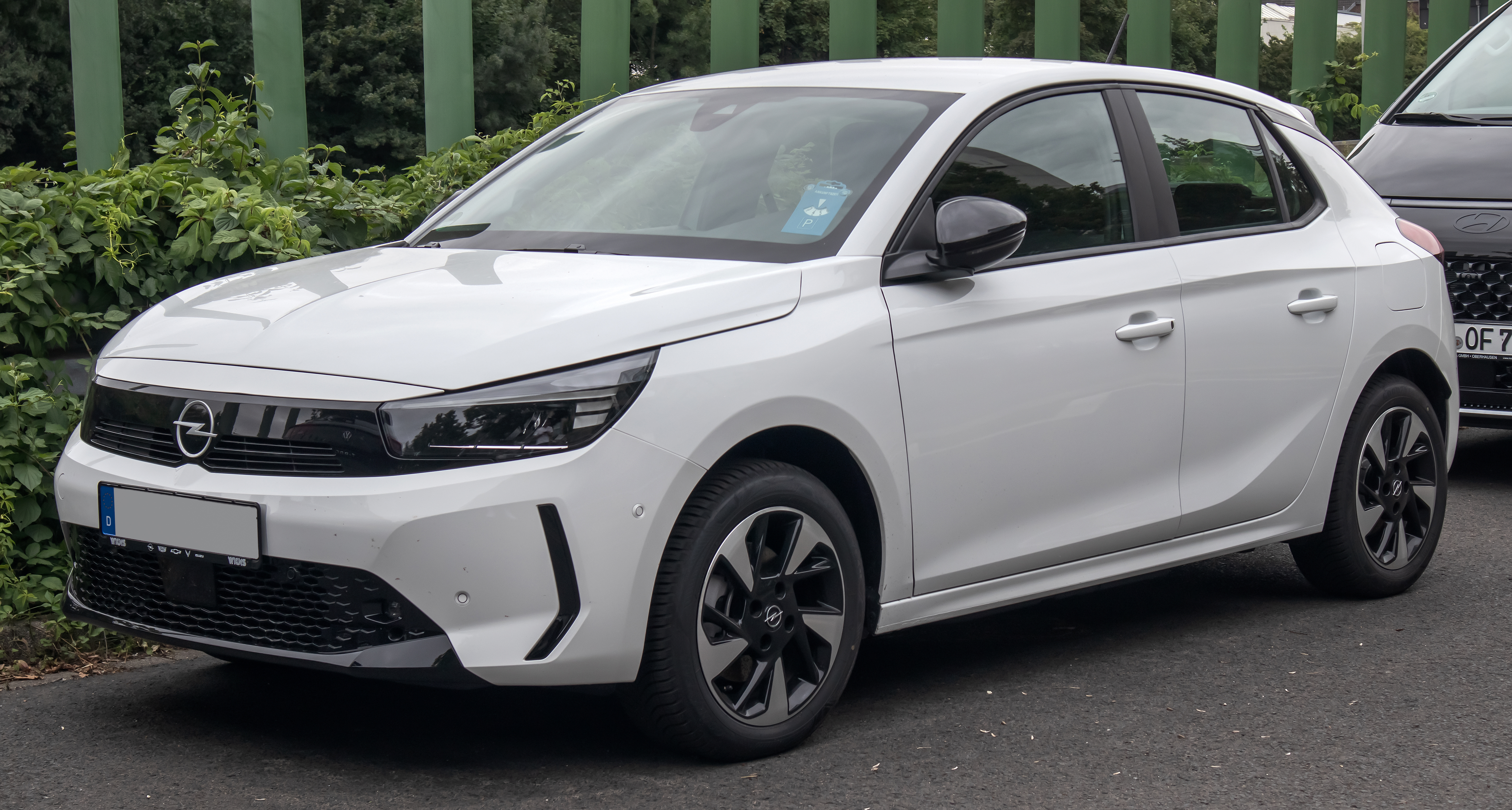
Opel Corsa Electric (facelift)

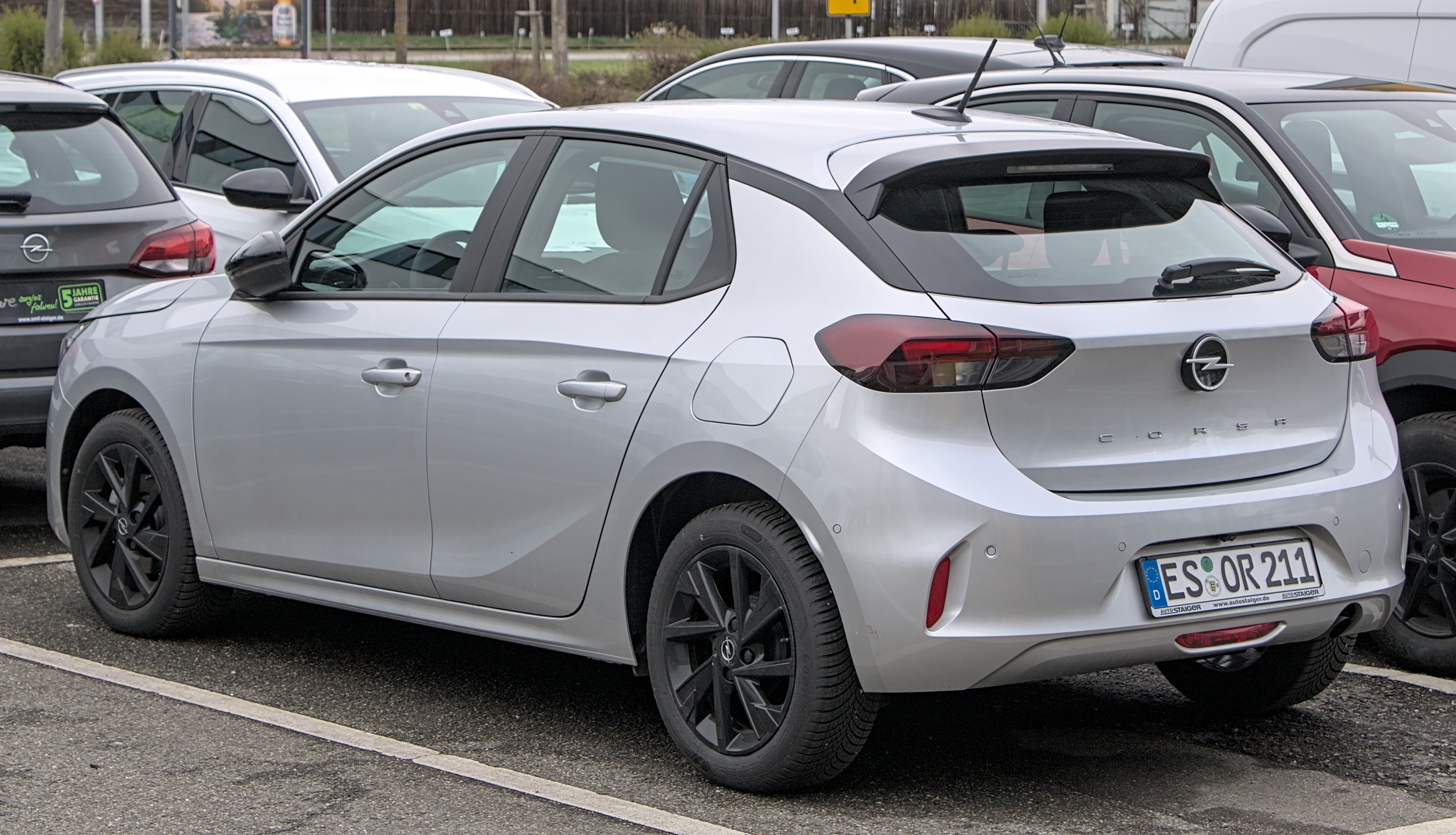
Rear view (facelift)

=== Corsa GSE ===
The Corsa GSE was teased on 24 February 2026, with the teaser picture showing only the wheel. It is believed to be the first hot hatch from Opel since the discontinuation of the Corsa OPC. It will share the same platform as the current generation Corsa, which also shares its platform with the Mokka GSE. The vehicle was first spotted being tested on the road in early March 2026. Final testing was performed on the Nürburgring in late March 2026.

The vehicle was revealed on 6th May 2026, featuring the same powertrain as the Mokka GSE - 207 kilowatts (278 hp) and 345 newton-metres (254 lb⋅ft), 18-inch three-spoke alloy wheels, and upgraded Alcon brakes. The vehicle can go from 0 to 100 kilometres per hour (62 mph) in 5.5 seconds - the fastest production car from Opel to do so. It will be publicly debuted at the Paris Motor Show in October 2026.

In a press release in the UK, the car "revives the tradition of sporty Vauxhall superminis, including Nova GTE, Nova GSi, Corsa GSi, and Corsa VXR".

Front

Rear View

=== Safety ===
ANCAP test results* Opel Corsa all variants (2019, aligned with Euro NCAP)
Test	Points	%
Overall:	5 /5 stars	
Adult occupant:	31.9	84%
Child occupant:	42.5	86%
Pedestrian:	32.1	66%
Safety assist:	9.2	71%

Euro NCAP test results* Opel Corsa 1.2 'Edition' (LHD) (2019)
Test	Points	%
Overall:	4 /5 stars	
Adult occupant:	31.9	84%
Child occupant:	42.5	86%
Pedestrian:	32.1	66%
Safety assist:	9	69%

== Corsa G (2028) ==
The next generation of Corsa will be all-electric. Like the Peugeot 208, it will be based on the Stellantis STLA One platform. It is expected to be released in 2028.

== Corsa Van ==
The Corsa Van was a car derived van based on the corresponding generation of the Corsa superminis that were produced from 1983 to 2018. It first appeared in 1983, and was identical to the regular car, aside from the panelled rear windows (optional, glazed models were also available) and the missing rear seat. This was replaced by a flat metal loading floor. Payload of the original Corsa A is 405 kg (893 lb) and the entire range of engines was available, at first.

It was usually marketed under the names used in various countries, such as Corsa Lieferwagen (Germany), Bestelwagen (Dutch), or Fourgonnette (French). The Vauxhall version is called the "Corsavan" since 1994, linking it to the earlier Astravan model. Earlier models were called Vauxhall Novavan in the United Kingdom.

Corsa Van variants of later generation Corsas have also been sold under the Opel/Vauxhall brand. It was discontinued in 2018.

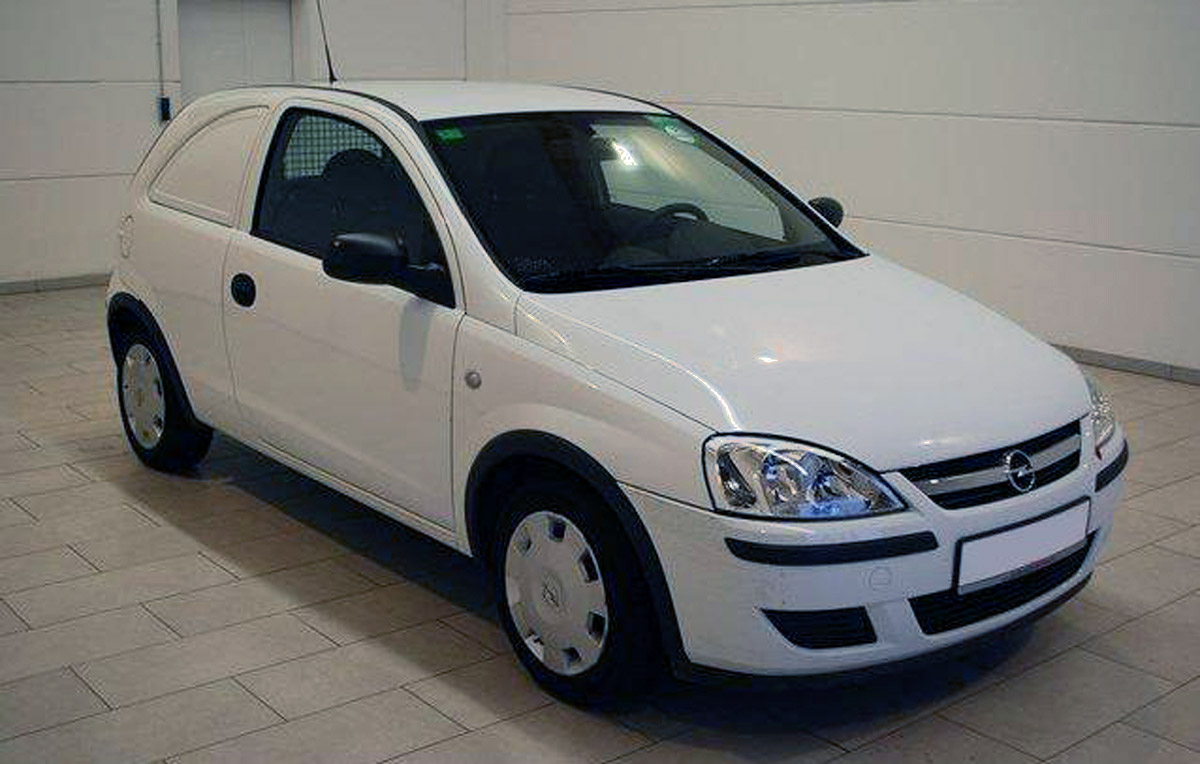
Opel Corsa Van based on third generation (Corsa C)

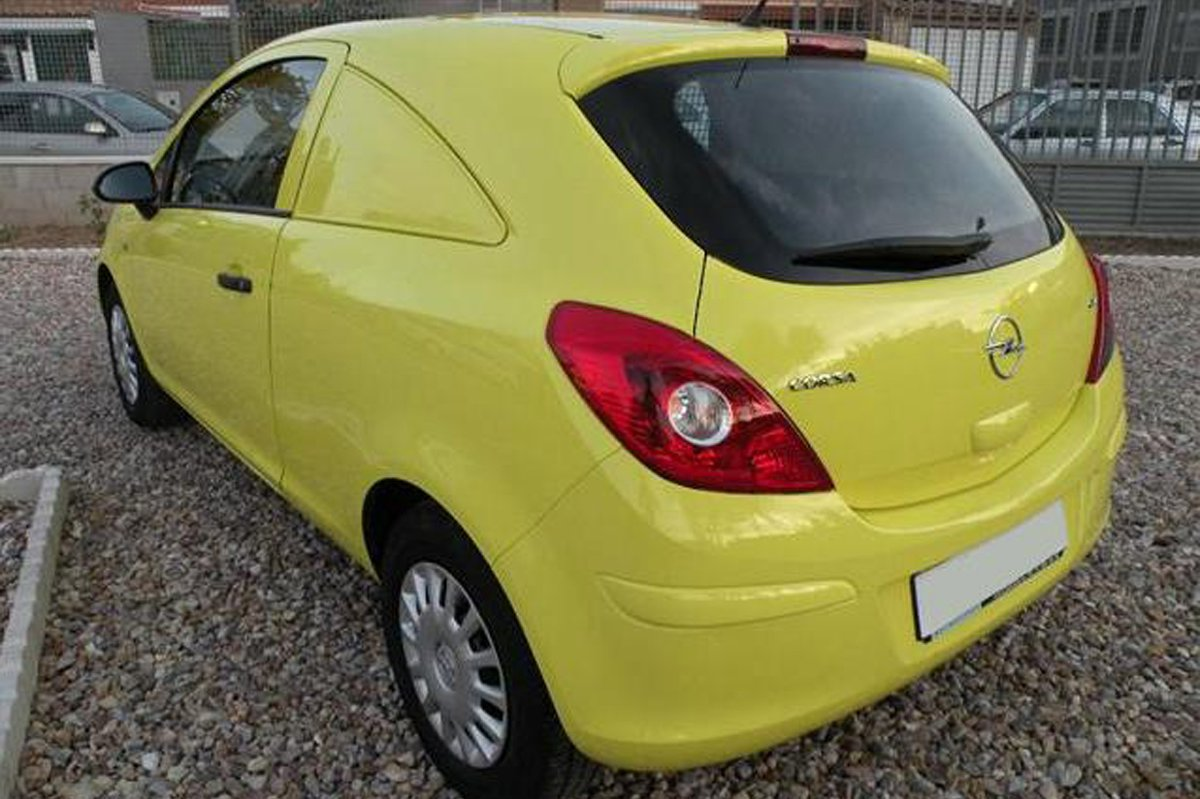
Opel Corsa Van based on fourth generation (Corsa D)

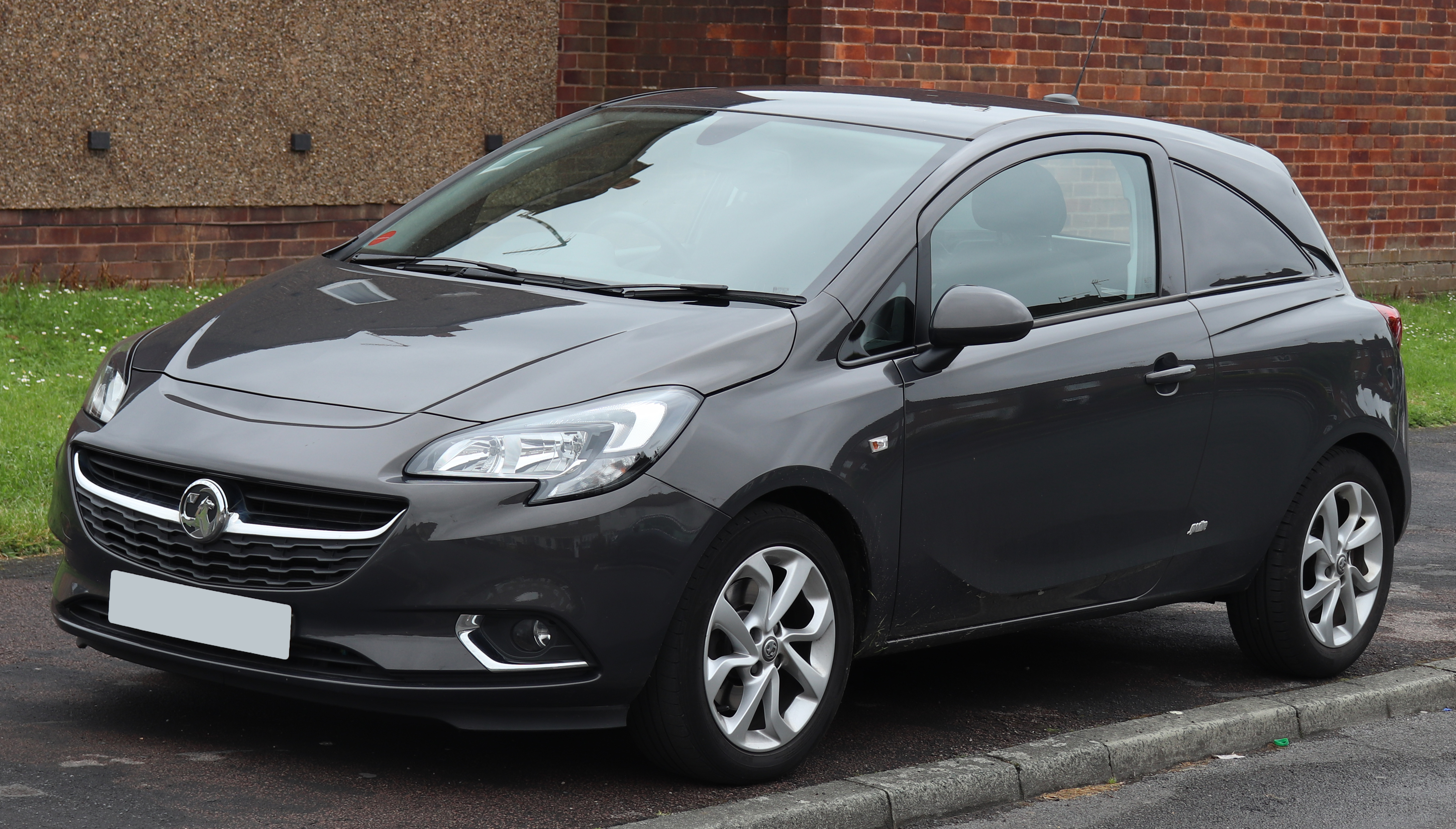
Vauxhall Corsavan based on the fifth-generation (Corsa E)

== Corsa GSE Vision Gran Turismo ==
The Corsa GSE Vision Gran Turismo concept car was teased on 13 August 2025, and later revealed on 20 August 2025. The vehicle has an output of 588 kilowatts (789 hp), and 800 newton-metres (590 lb⋅ft) of torque, with a top speed of 320 kilometres per hour (200 mph). The design of the vehicle included the new "Compass" containing "precise horizontal and vertical elements" as well as "optimised aero solutions". The vehicle became available within the video game Gran Turismo 7 on 24 September 2025.

== Popularity ==
From the first Corsa being sold in the United Kingdom on 2 April 1993, sales had reached 1,371,573 within sixteen years of its launch, by which time the Corsa was in its third generation.

As of 2018, the Vauxhall Corsa was the third most popular car in the United Kingdom, with 1,205,158 taxed and on the road with another 39,286 declared SORN (Statutory Off Road Notification).

In 2021, the Vauxhall Corsa grabbed the top spot for the most popular car of the year having had more new cars registered than any other in the UK throughout 2021. The Corsa managed to achieve 40,914 new registrations throughout the year, beating second place by over 6,000 registrations. This meant that the Ford Fiesta was finally beaten after holding the mantle of most popular car for 12 successive years. In fact, the Ford Fiesta didn't even achieve a top 10 finish after being heavily affected by chip shortages and Ford prioritising sales of more profitable SUVs, such as the Puma.

The Vauxhall Corsa was the "UK's Best Selling Small Car" for Q1 2026 (January, February and March 2026), as revealed through a number of press releases.
