= General Motors Gamma platform =

GM Gamma platform
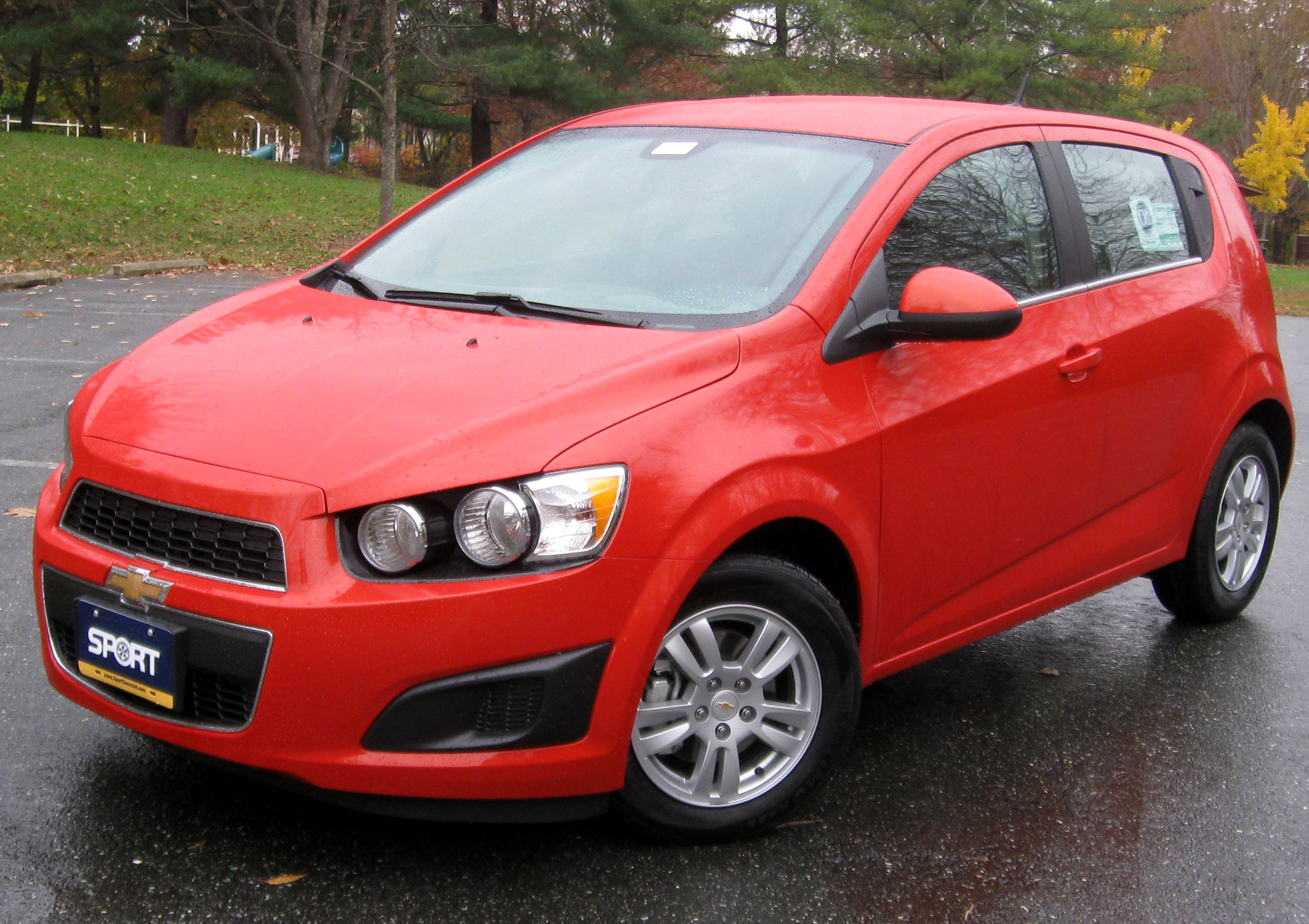
- Chevrolet Aveo/Sonic, example of subcompact car based on the Gamma II platform

Overview
- Manufacturer: General Motors
- Also called: GM4300 platform
- Production: 1999–present

Body and chassis
- Class: Subcompact (B)
- Layout: Transverse front-engine, front-wheel drive/all-wheel drive

Chronology
- Predecessor: GM4200 platform
- Successor: GM VSS-F / GEM; CMP (for Opel/Vauxhall)

Gamma is General Motors' global subcompact front-wheel drive automobile platform, first used in the 2000 Opel Corsa C.

== Gamma / GM4300 ==
The first version of the platform was issued in autumn 2000 with the introduction of Opel Corsa C and was a development of the earlier GM4200 platform used in previous Corsa models, developed by Opel in Germany. The wheelbase was enlarged to 2,491 mm (98.1 in) from 2,465 mm (97.0 in) on the GM4200.

Vehicles based on this platform:

- 2000–2006 Opel Corsa C
- 2001–2010 Opel Combo C
- 2002–2010 Opel Meriva A
- 2003–2011 Chevrolet Montana
- 2004–2009 Opel Tigra TwinTop B
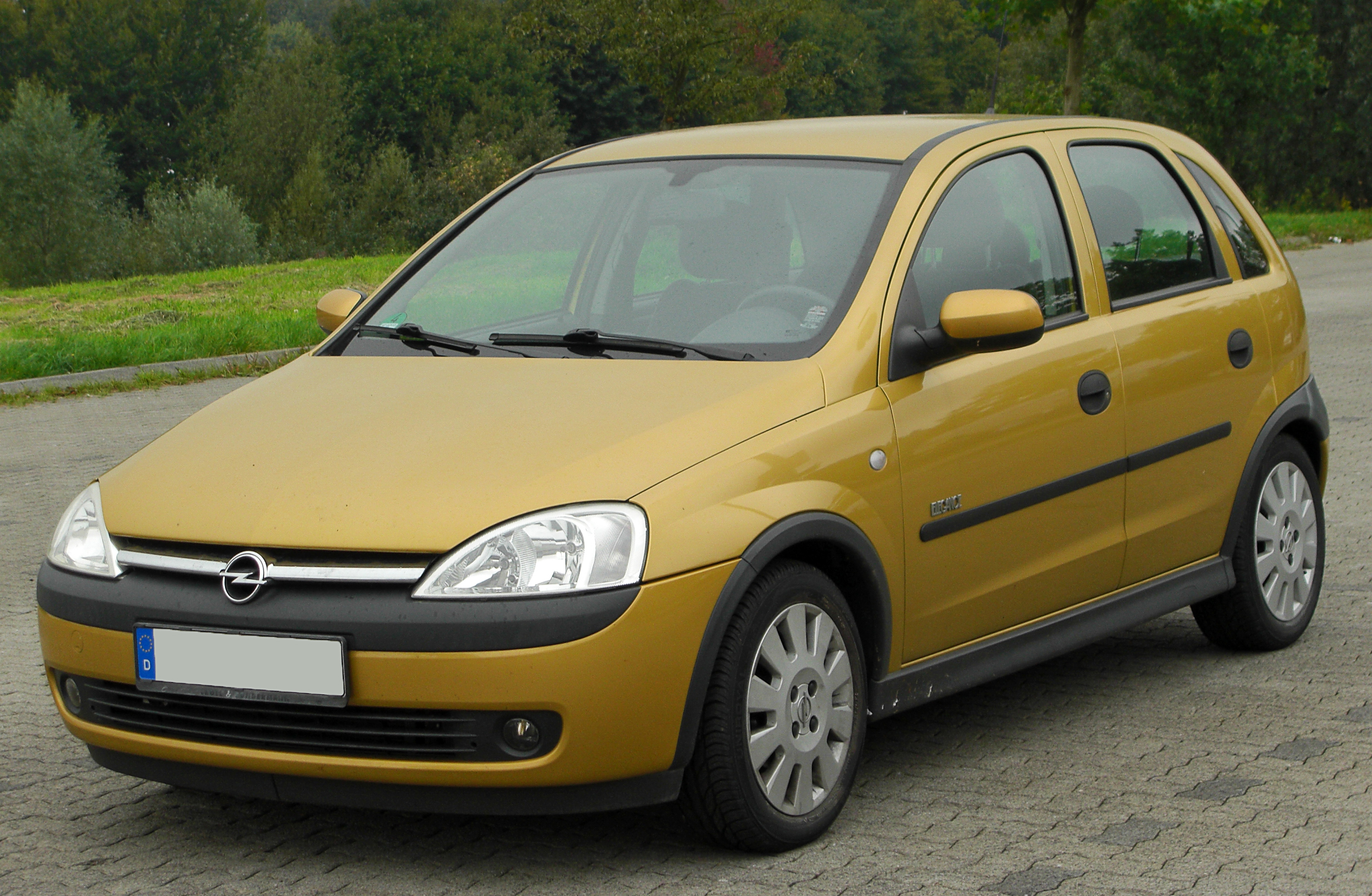
Opel Corsa C

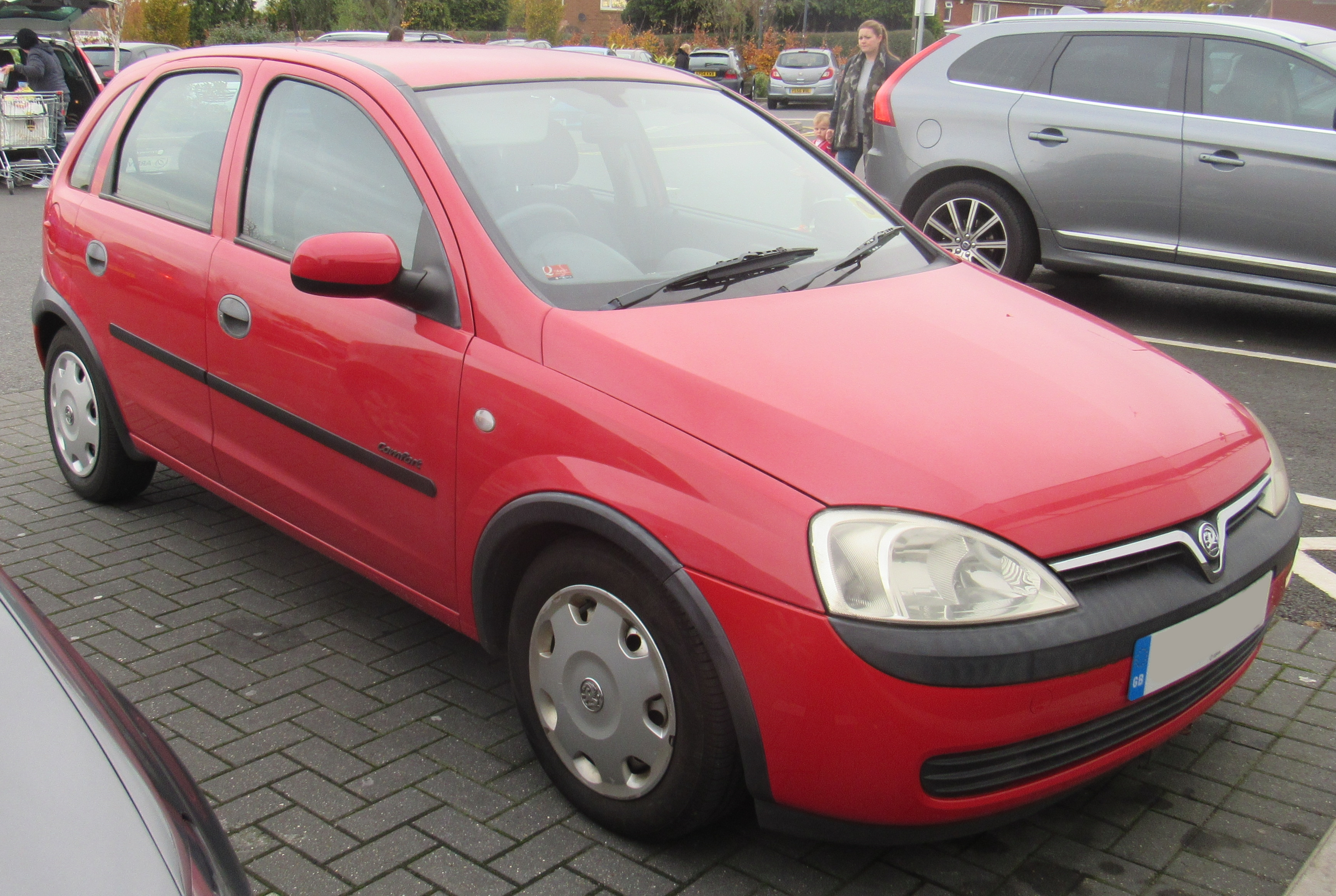
Vauxhall Corsa

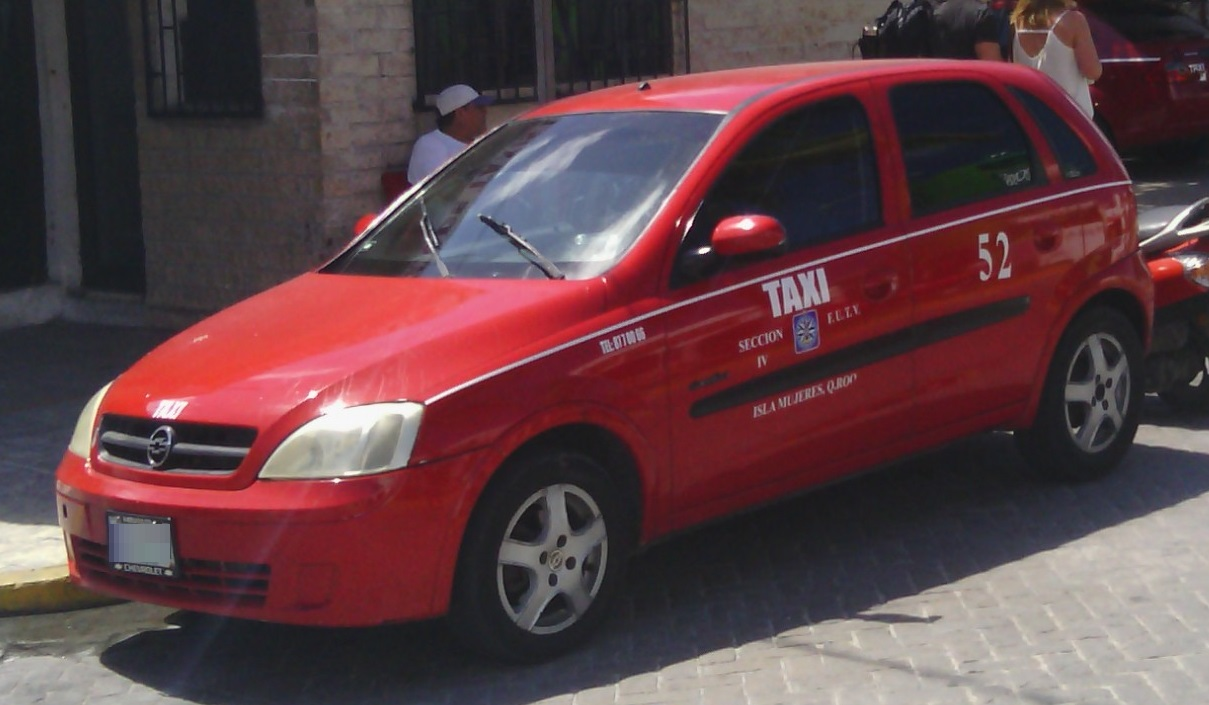
Chevrolet Corsa

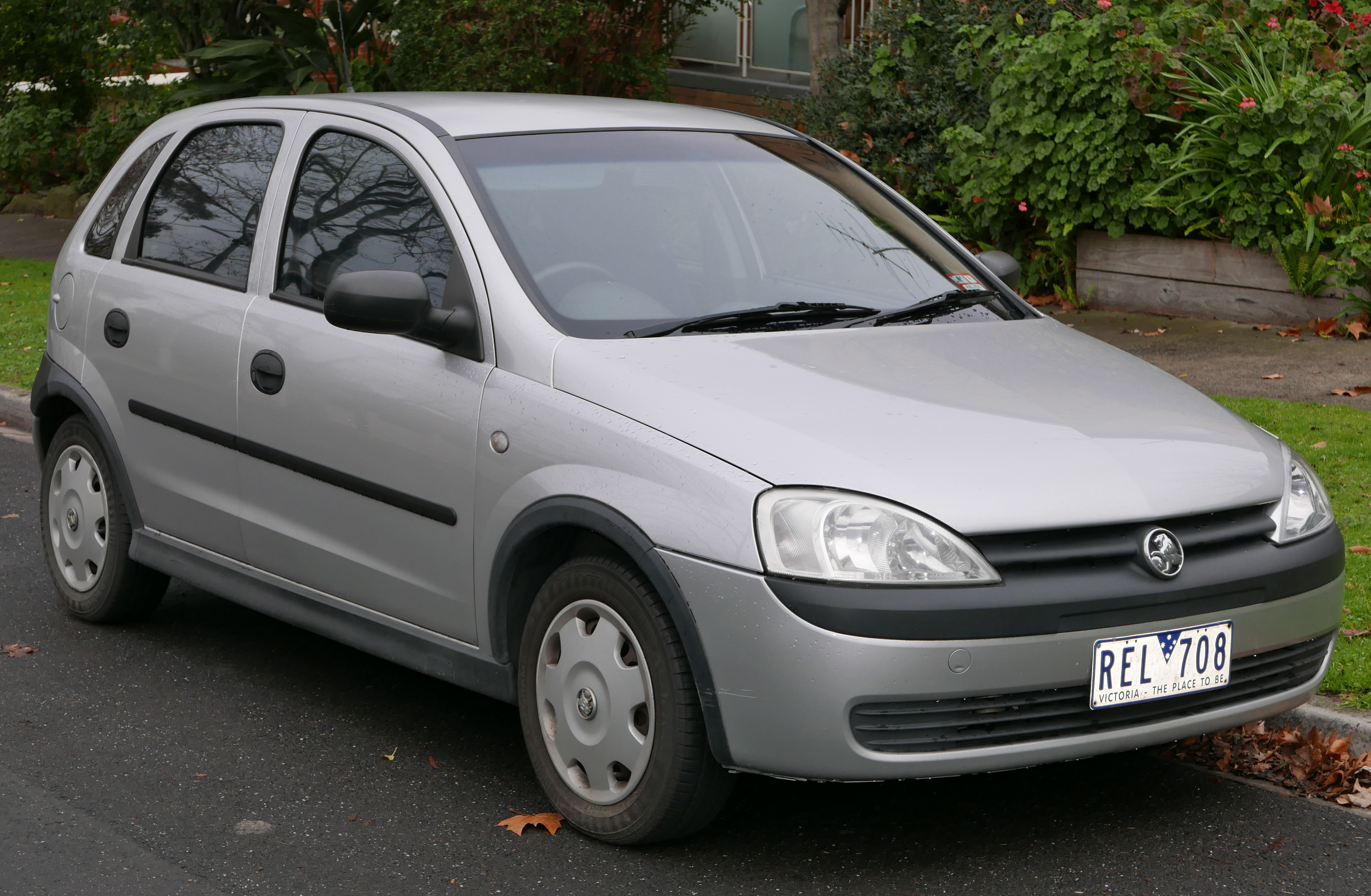
Holden Barina

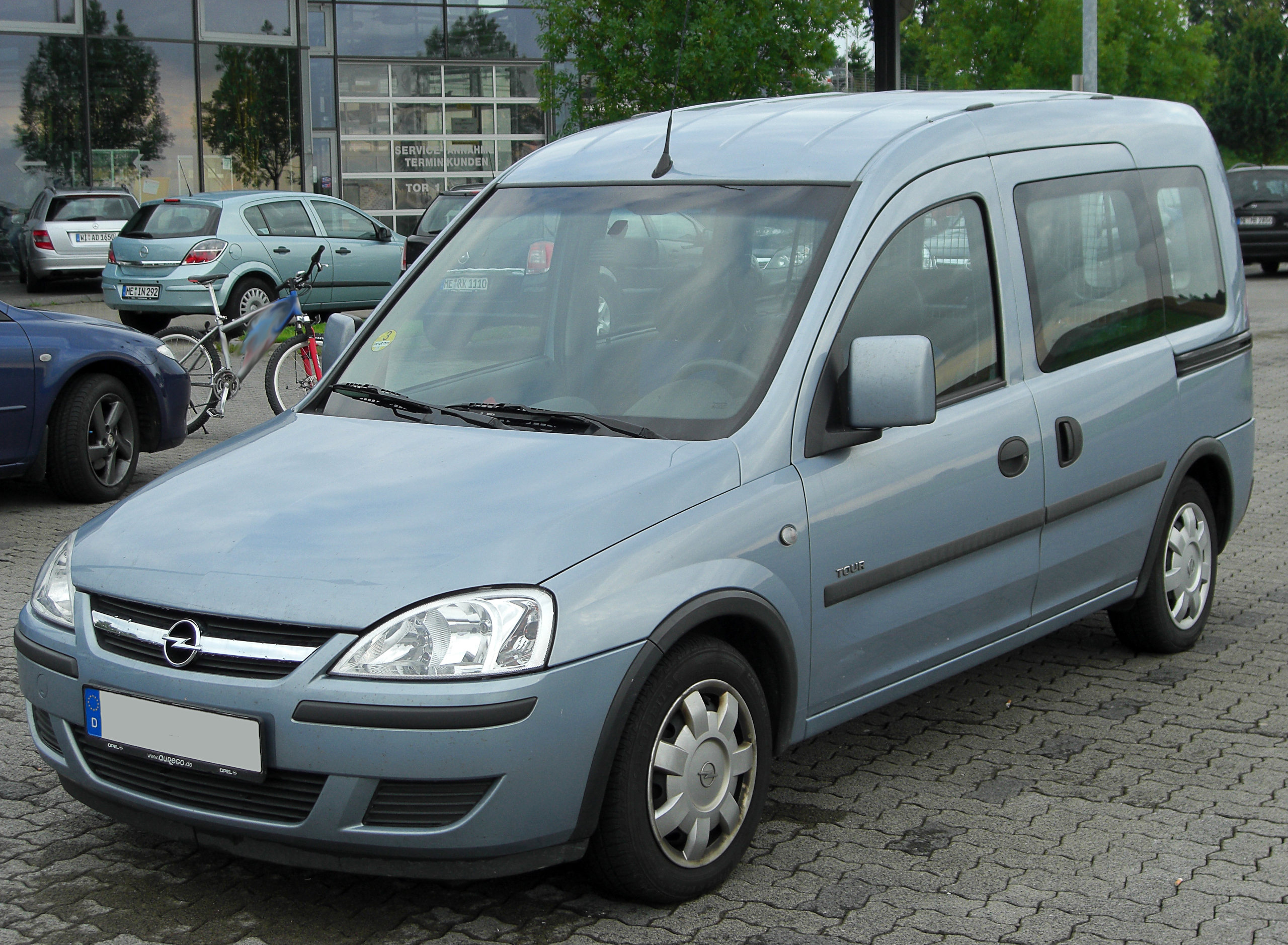
Opel Combo C

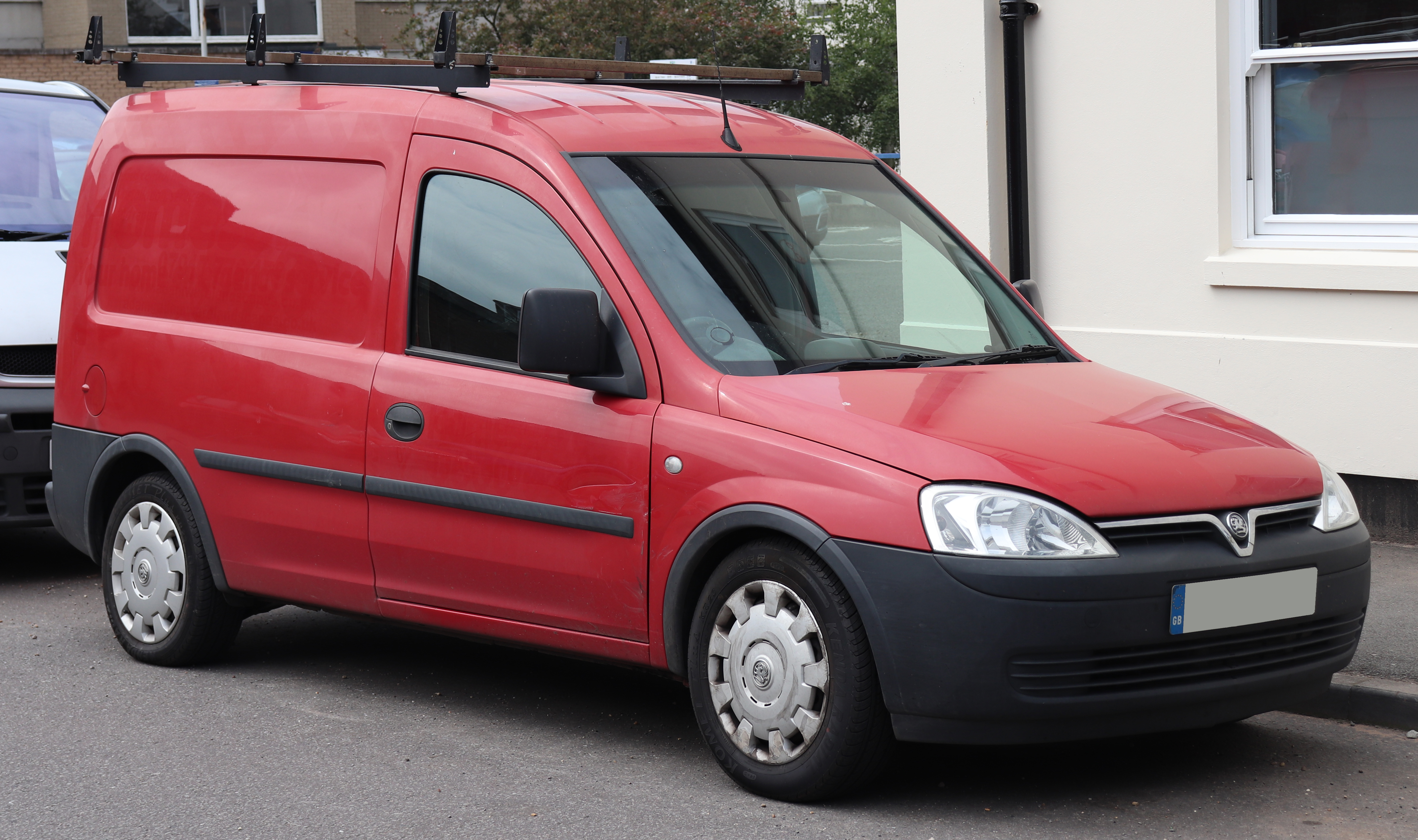
Vauxhall Combo

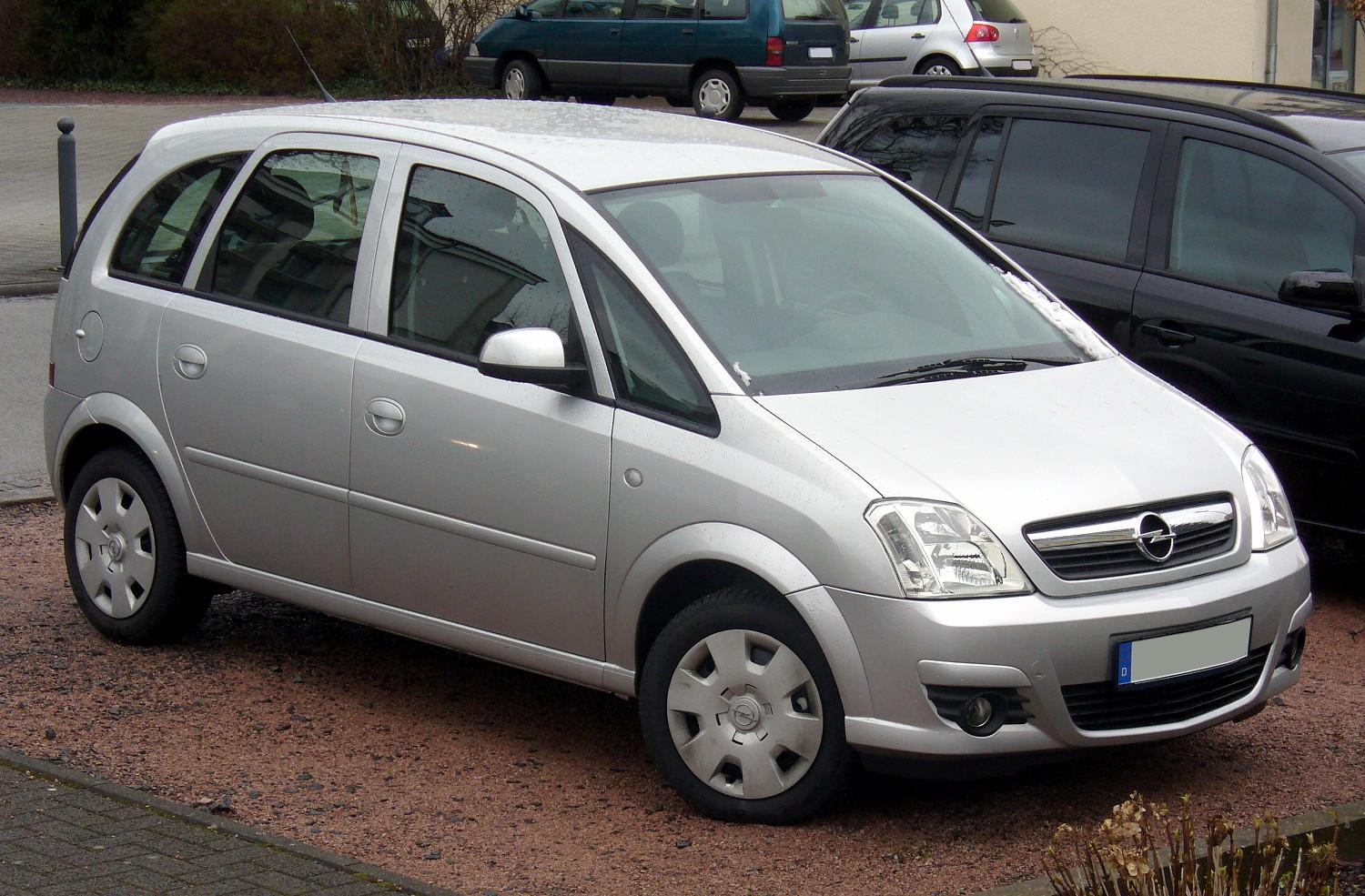
Opel Meriva A

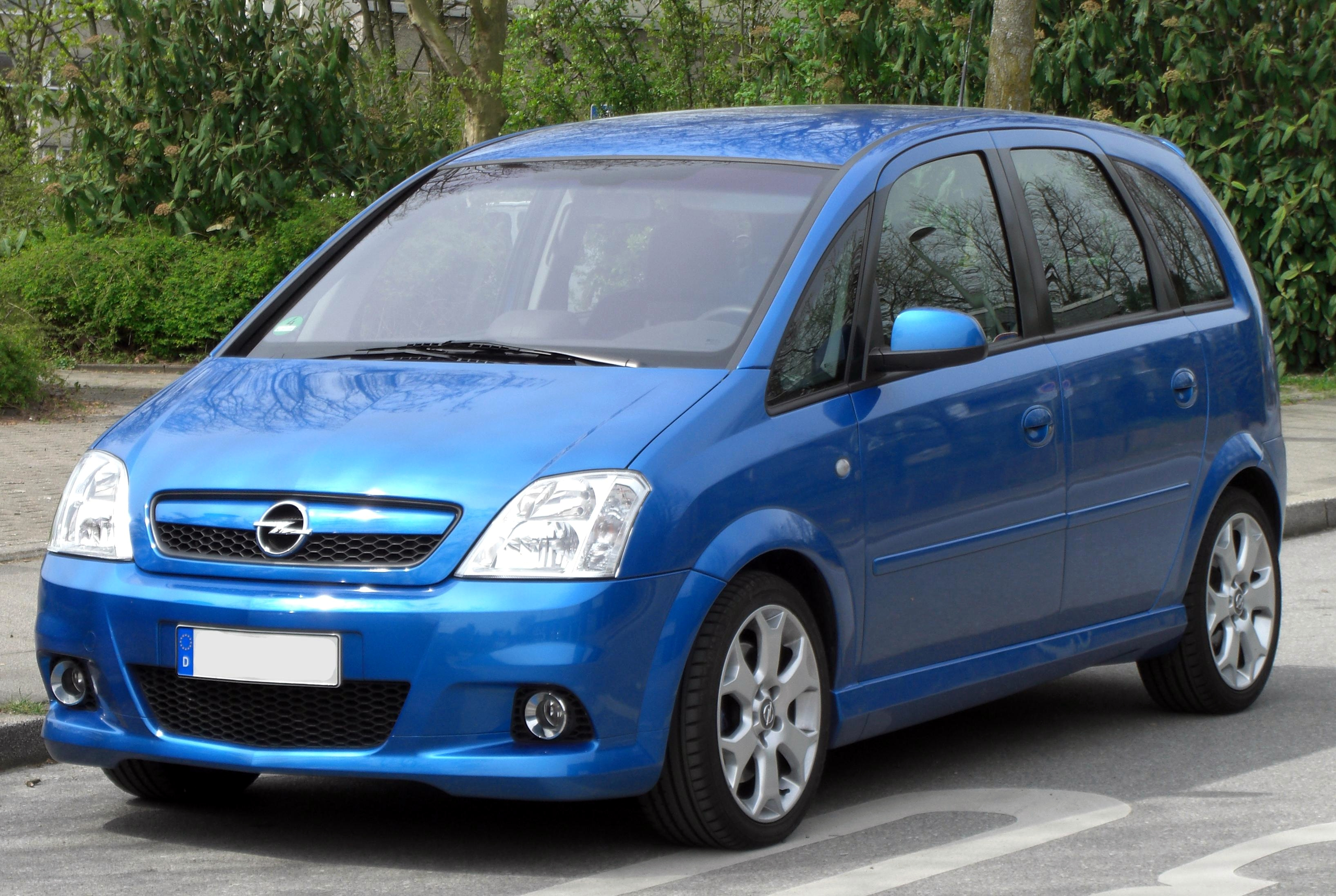
Opel Meriva OPC

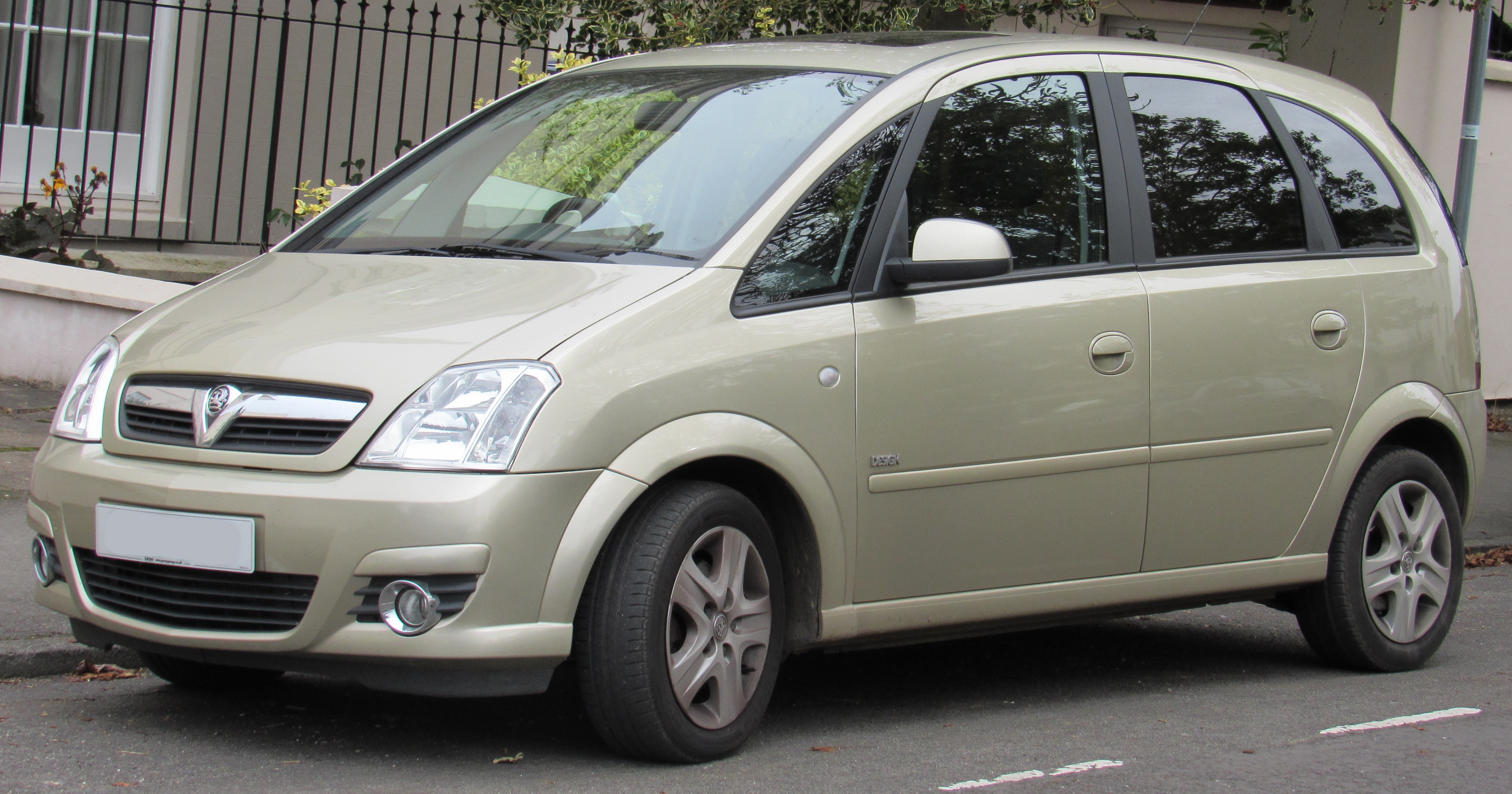
Vauxhall Meriva

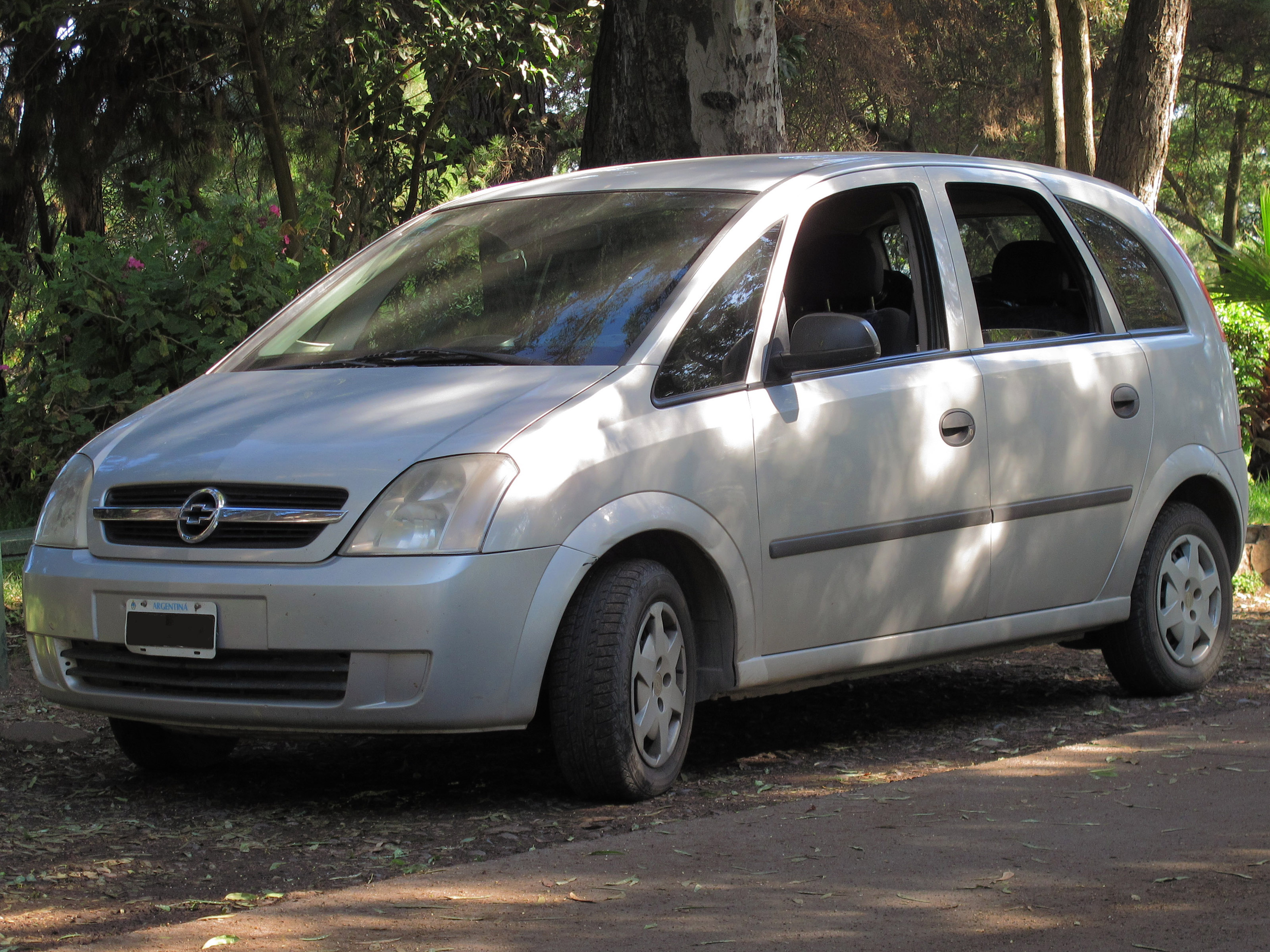
Chevrolet Meriva

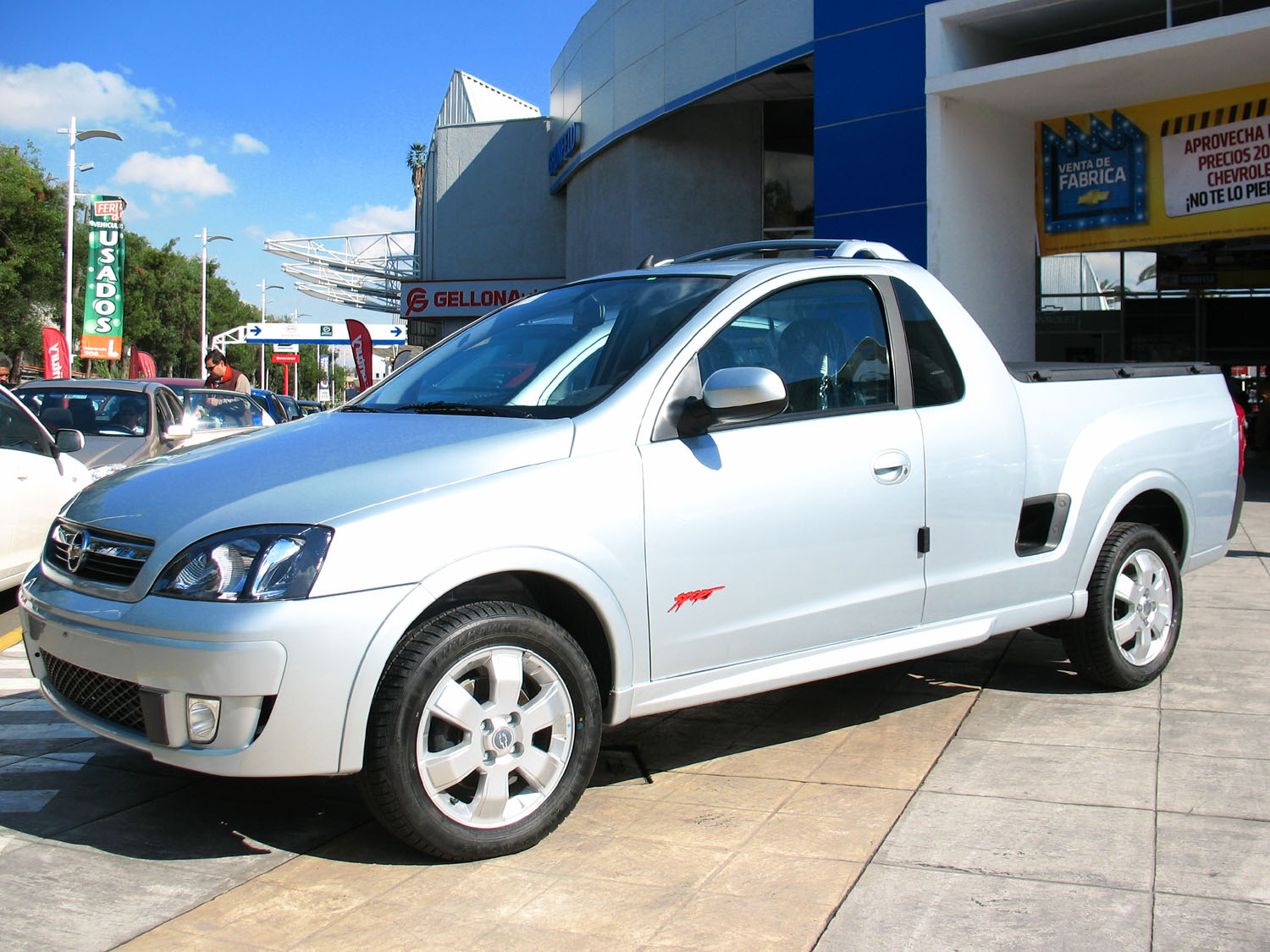
Chevrolet Montana

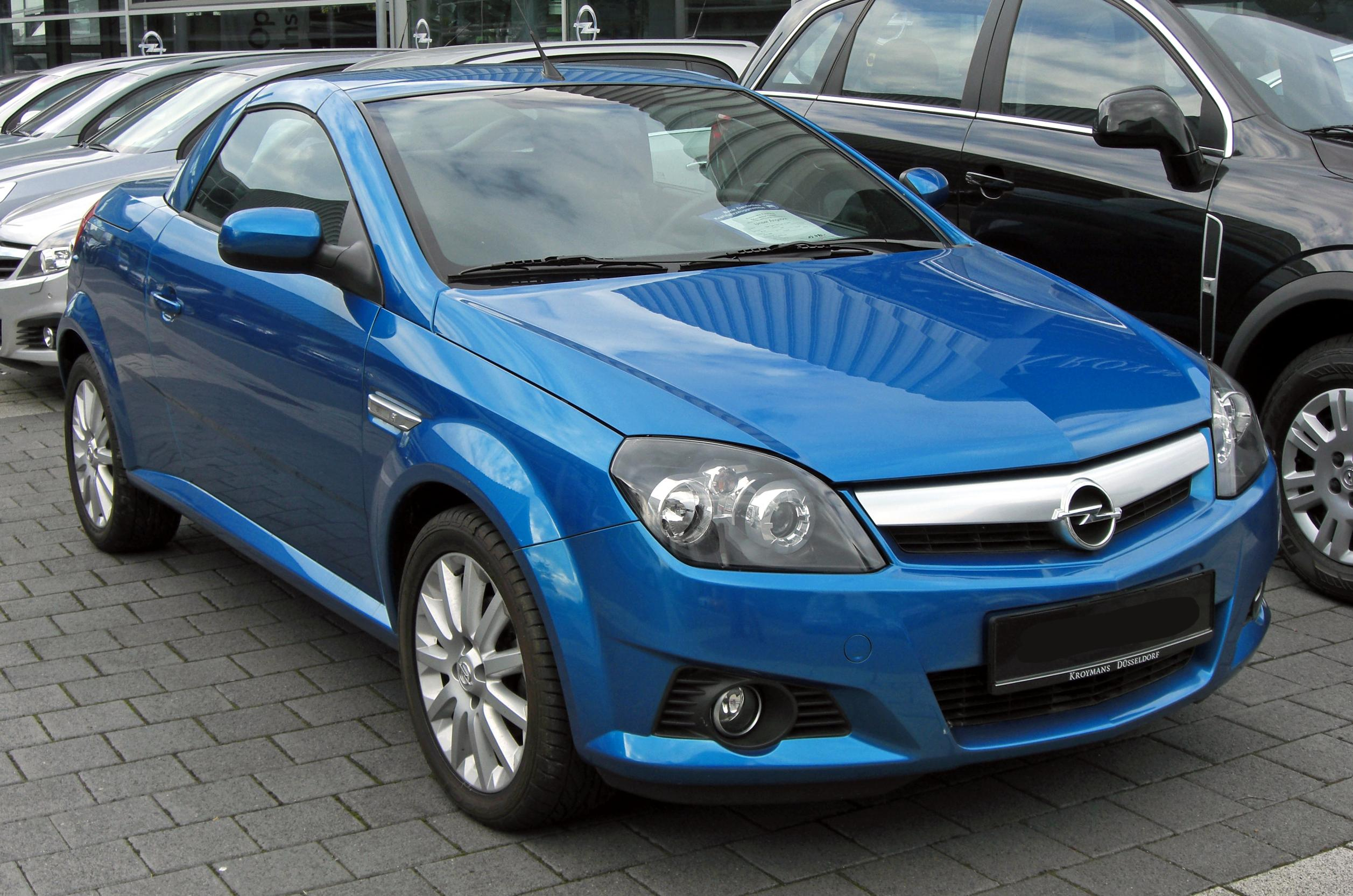
Opel Tigra TwinTop

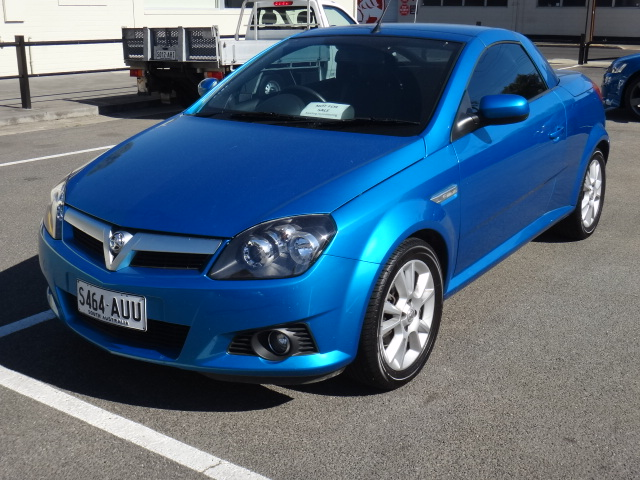
Holden Tigra

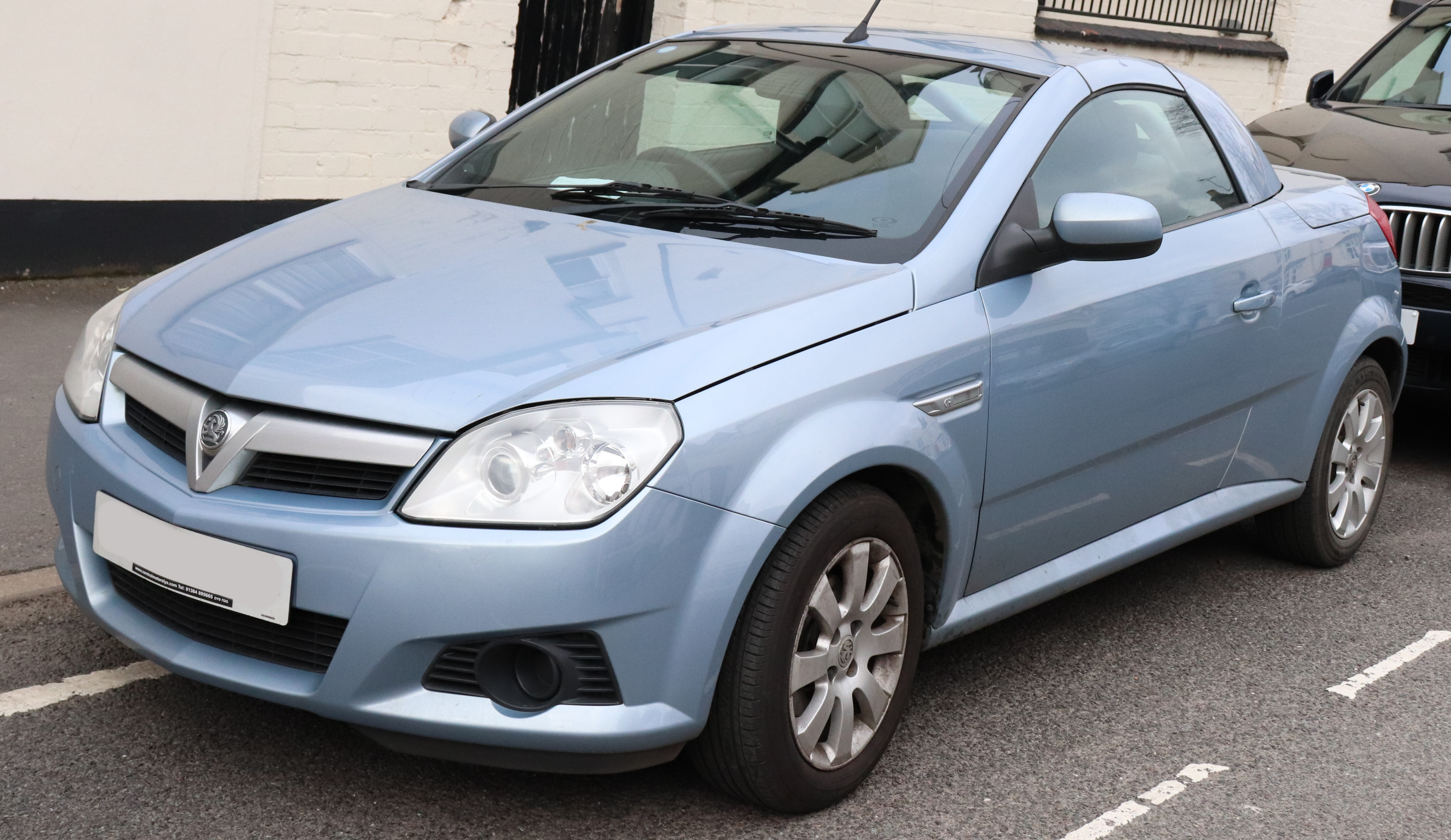
Vauxhall Tigra

== Gamma II ==
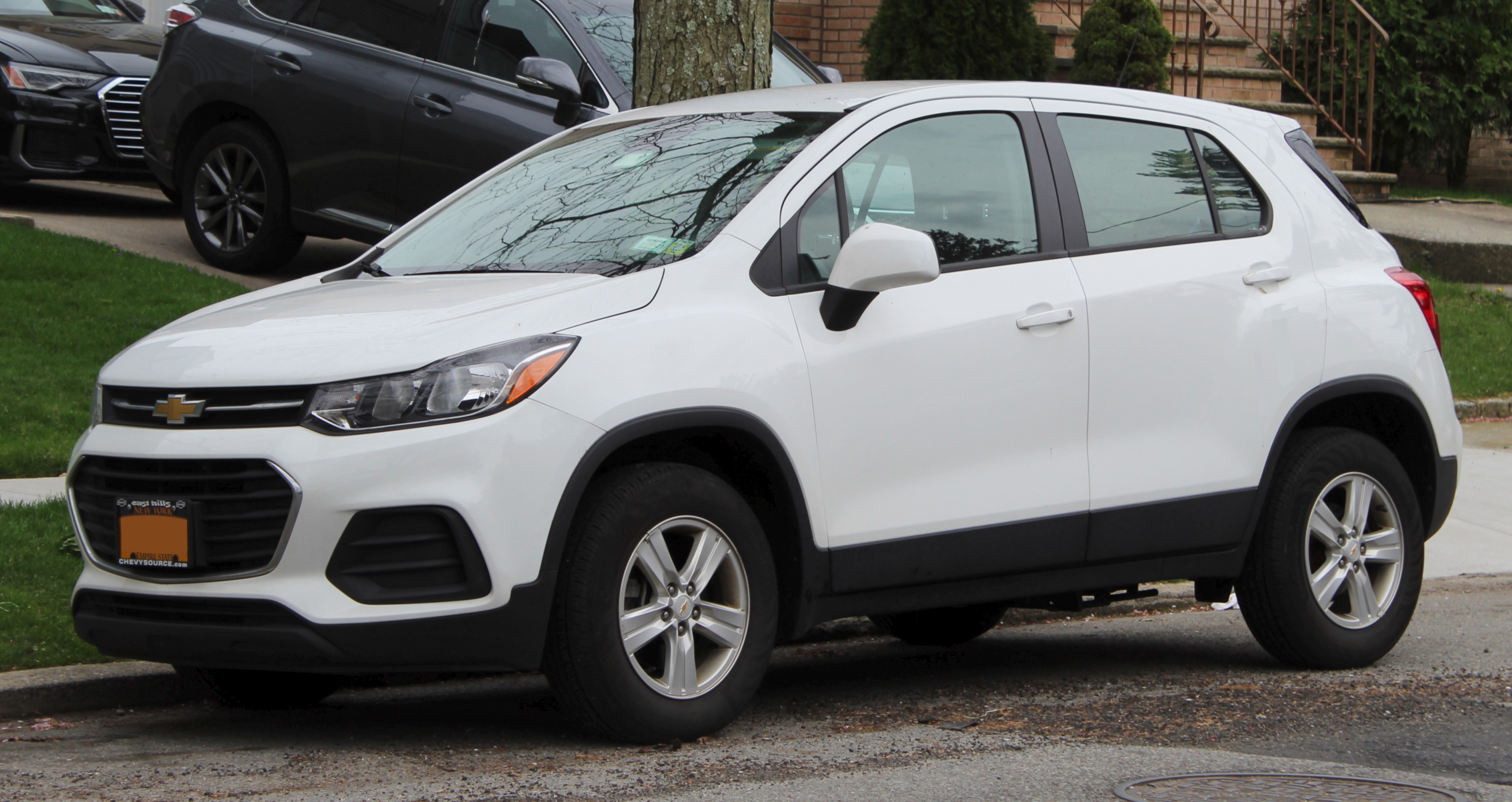
2017 Chevrolet Trax, subcompact crossover SUV based on the new Gamma platform

GM Korea has taken responsibility for future development of GM's GSV (Global Small Vehicle) architecture. This architecture will eventually be used for all small vehicles from GM, as a true global small car platform. While the original Gamma was developed by Opel, the Gamma II platform is under the leadership of GM Korea (formerly GM Daewoo).

The vehicles will be assembled at factories in the United States, Indonesia, Ecuador, Brazil, Germany, Colombia, Spain, India, South Korea, Mexico, Thailand, Venezuela, Uzbekistan, Vietnam, China and Russia.

Current and announced vehicles based on Gamma II (GSV) platform:

- 2010–2024 Chevrolet Spark, Holden Barina Spark
- 2010–2014 Chevrolet Sail
- 2011–2020 Chevrolet Aveo/Sonic, Holden Barina
- 2011–present Chevrolet Cobalt
- 2012–present Chevrolet Spin
- 2013–2019 Opel/Vauxhall Mokka
- 2013–2022 Buick Encore
- 2013–2024 Chevrolet Onix, Chevrolet Joy
- 2013–2024 Chevrolet Prisma Mk II, Chevrolet Joy Plus
- 2013–2022 Chevrolet Trax
- 2014–2019 Opel Karl/Vauxhall Viva
- 2015–2022 Chevrolet Spark, Holden Spark
- 2019–2022 VinFast Fadil
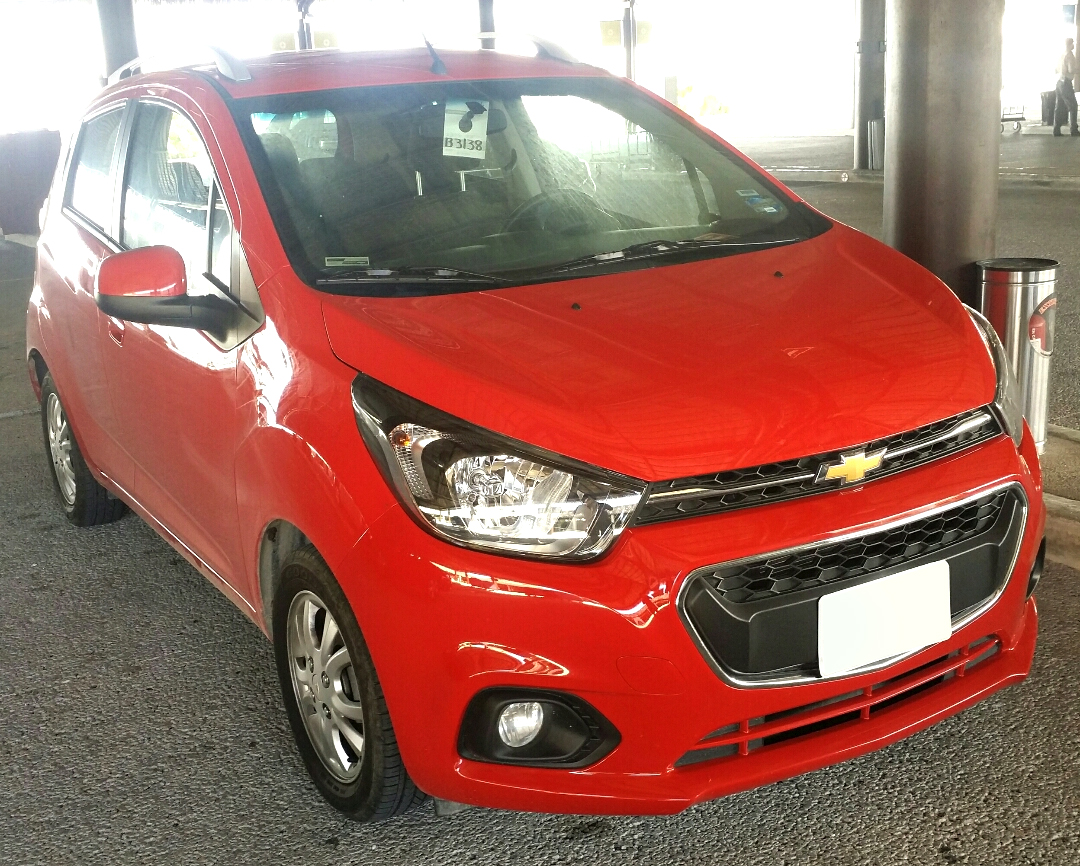
Chevrolet Beat/Chevrolet Spark GT

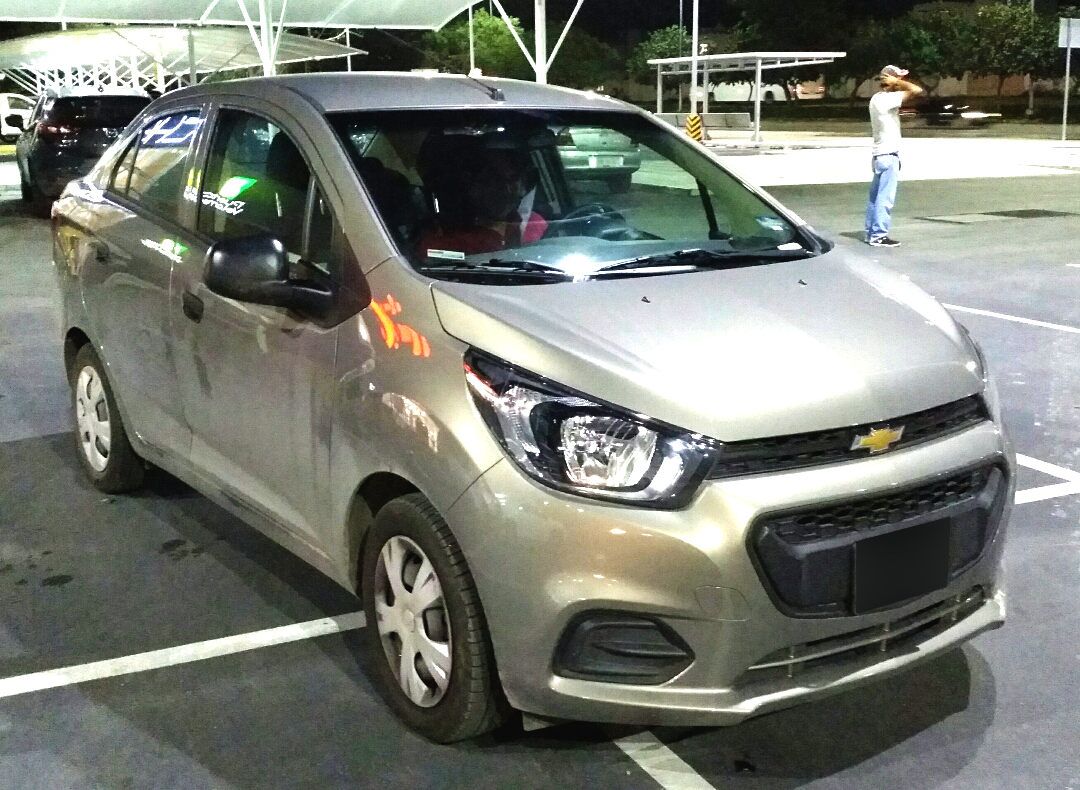
Chevrolet Beat NB

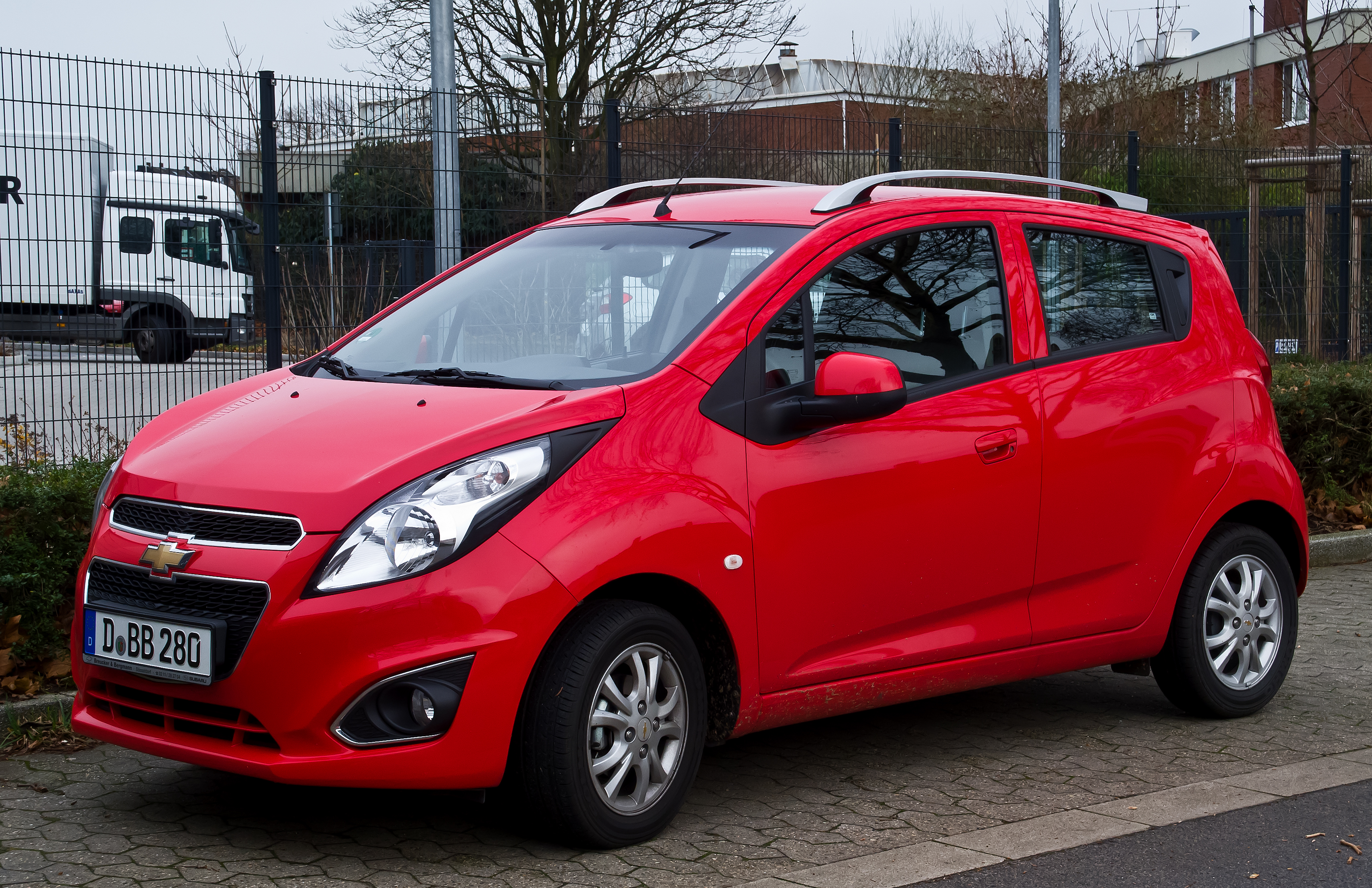
Chevrolet Spark

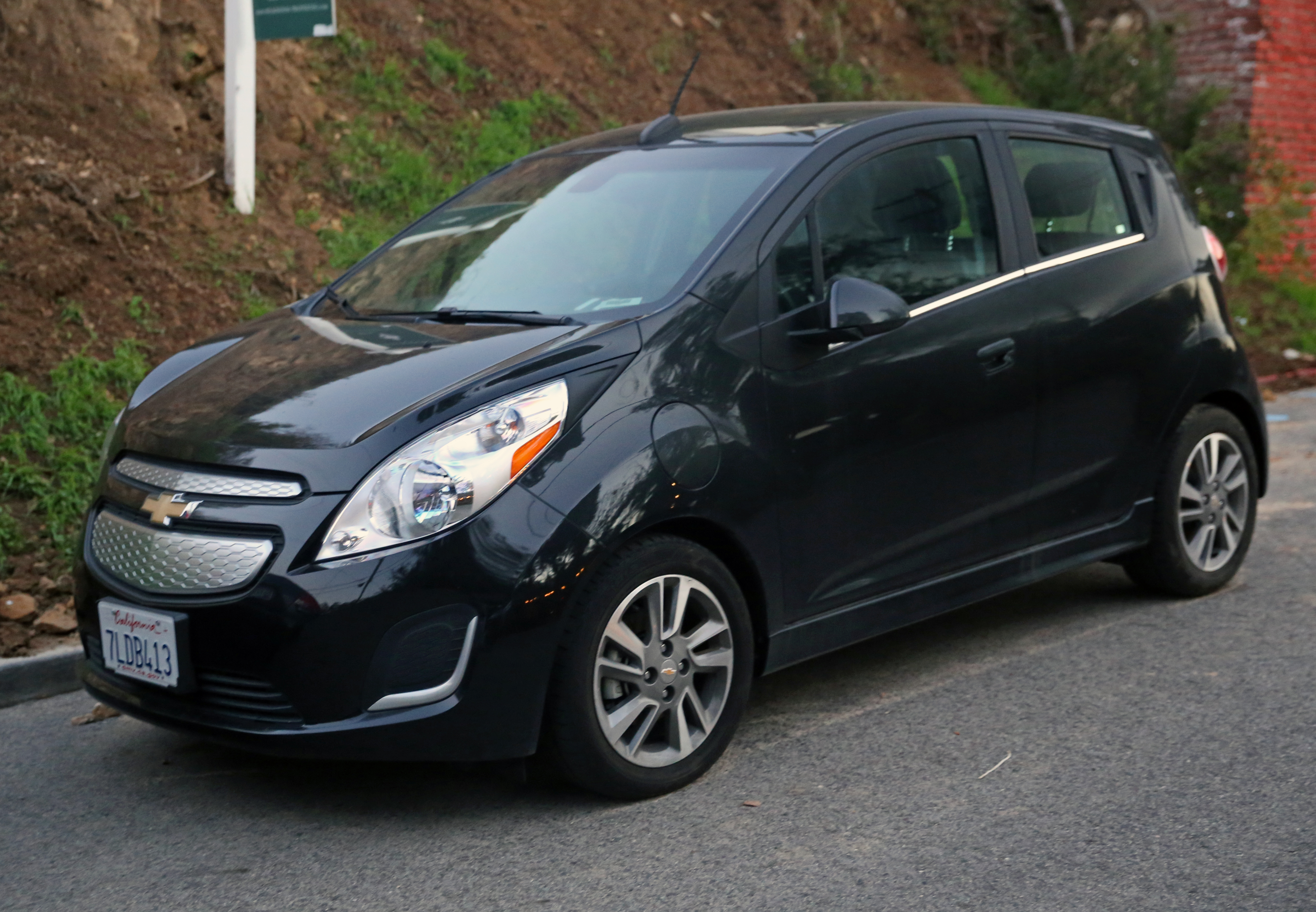
Chevrolet Spark EV

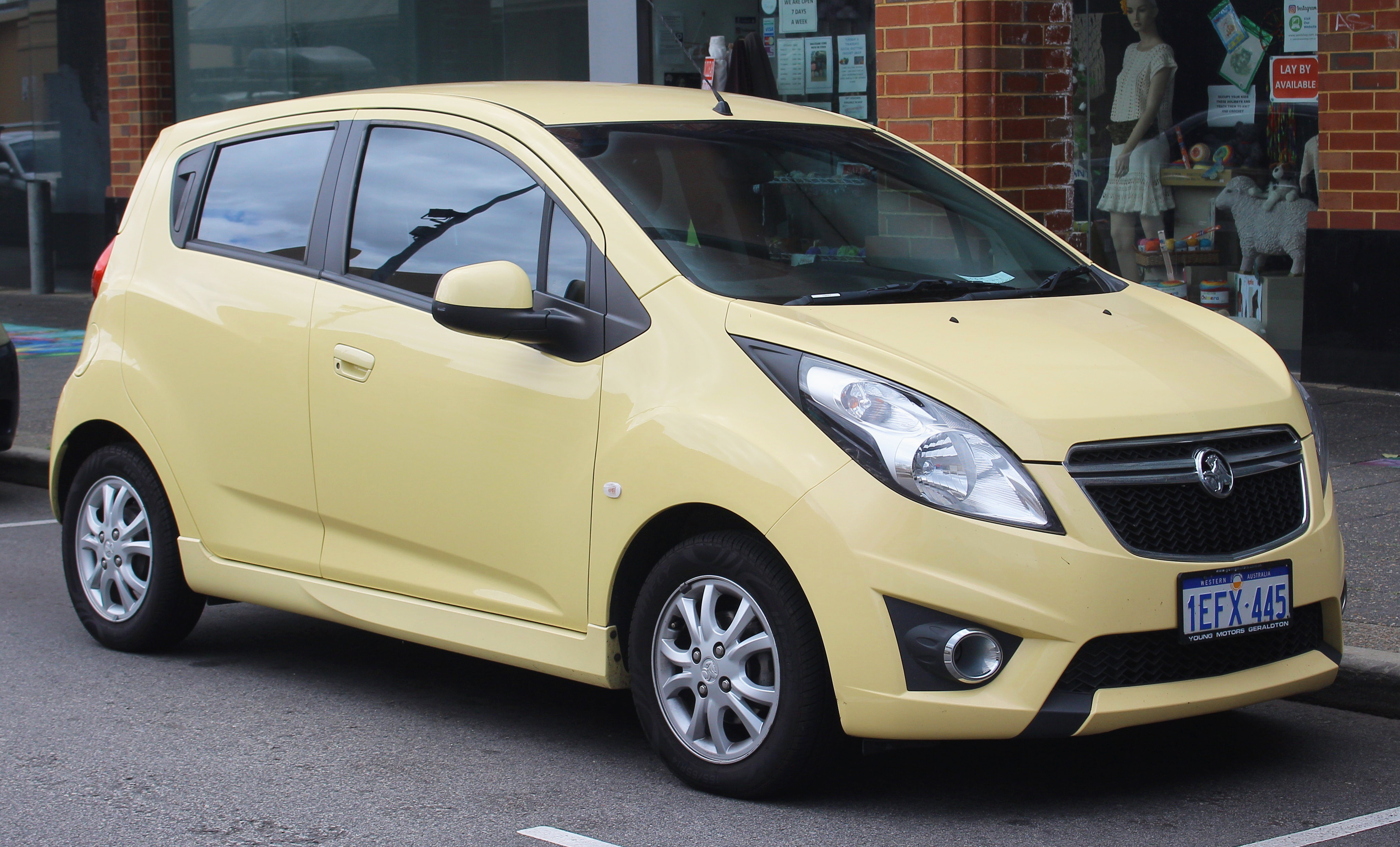
Holden Barina Spark

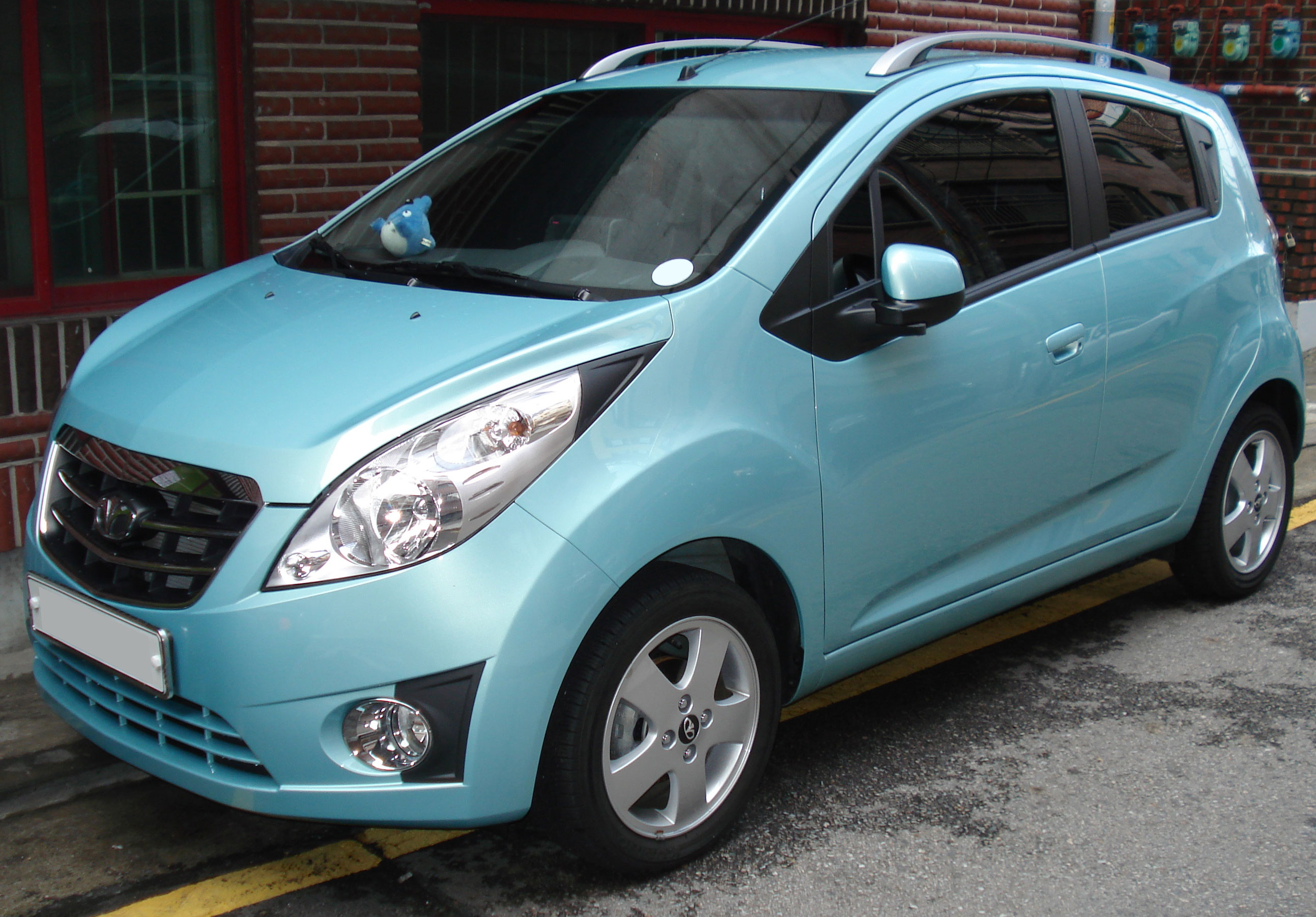
Daewoo Matiz Creative

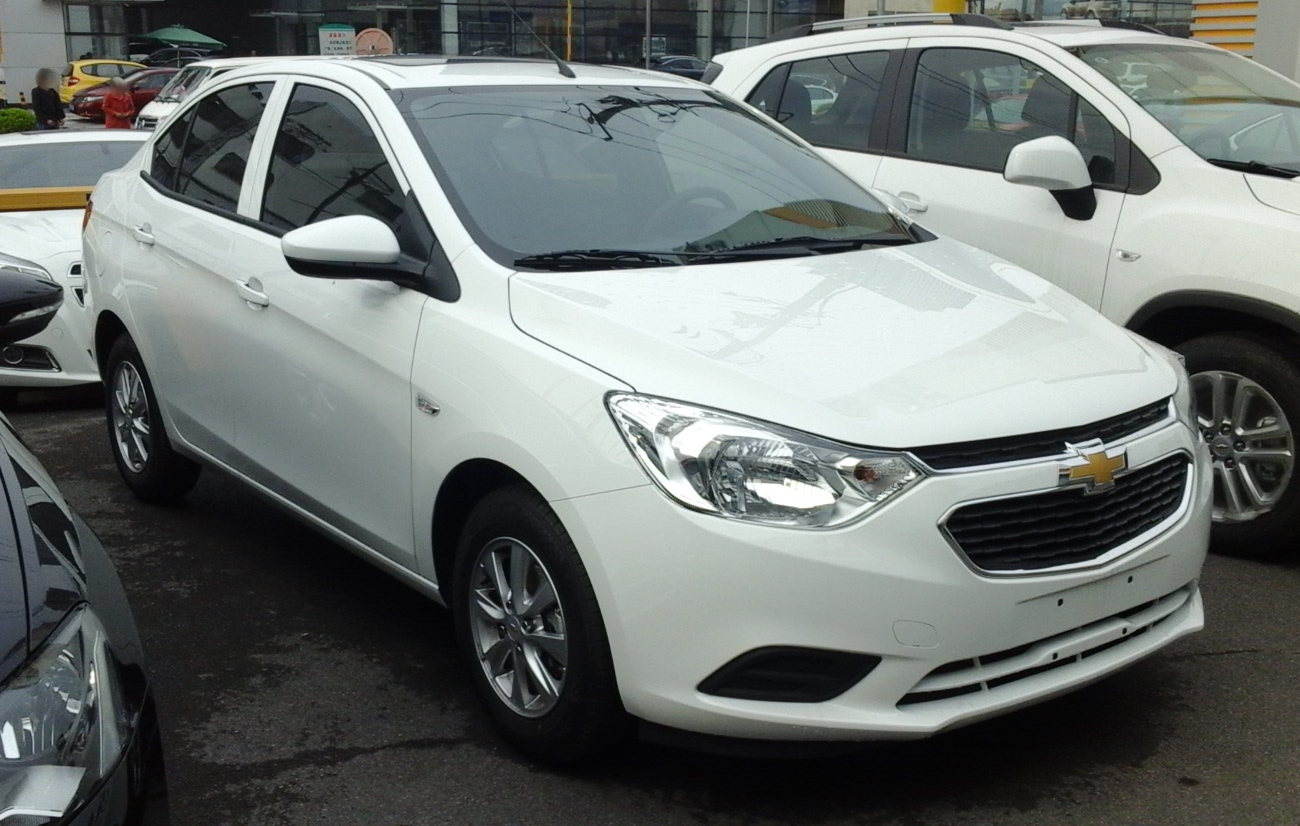
Chevrolet Sail

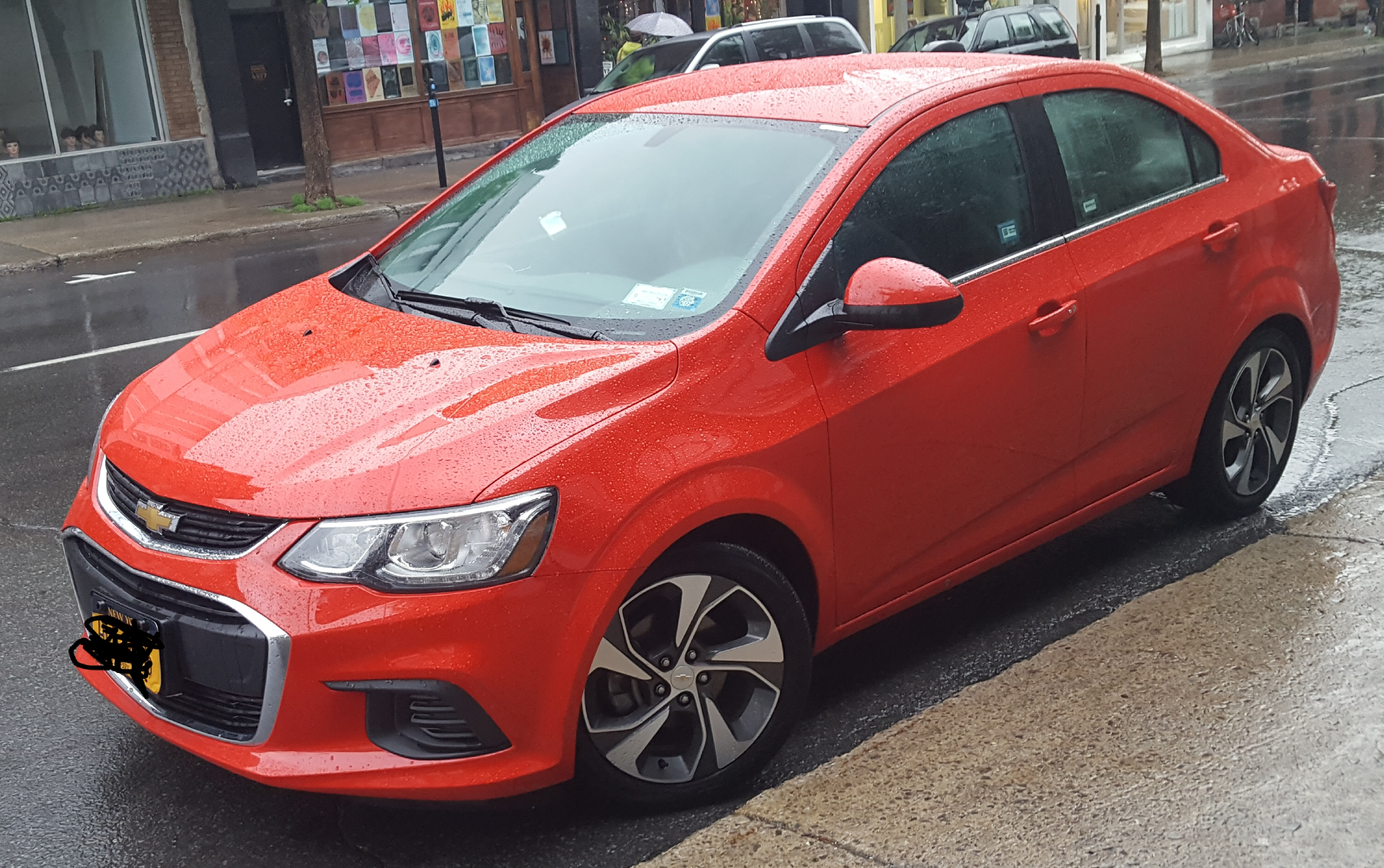
Chevrolet Sonic

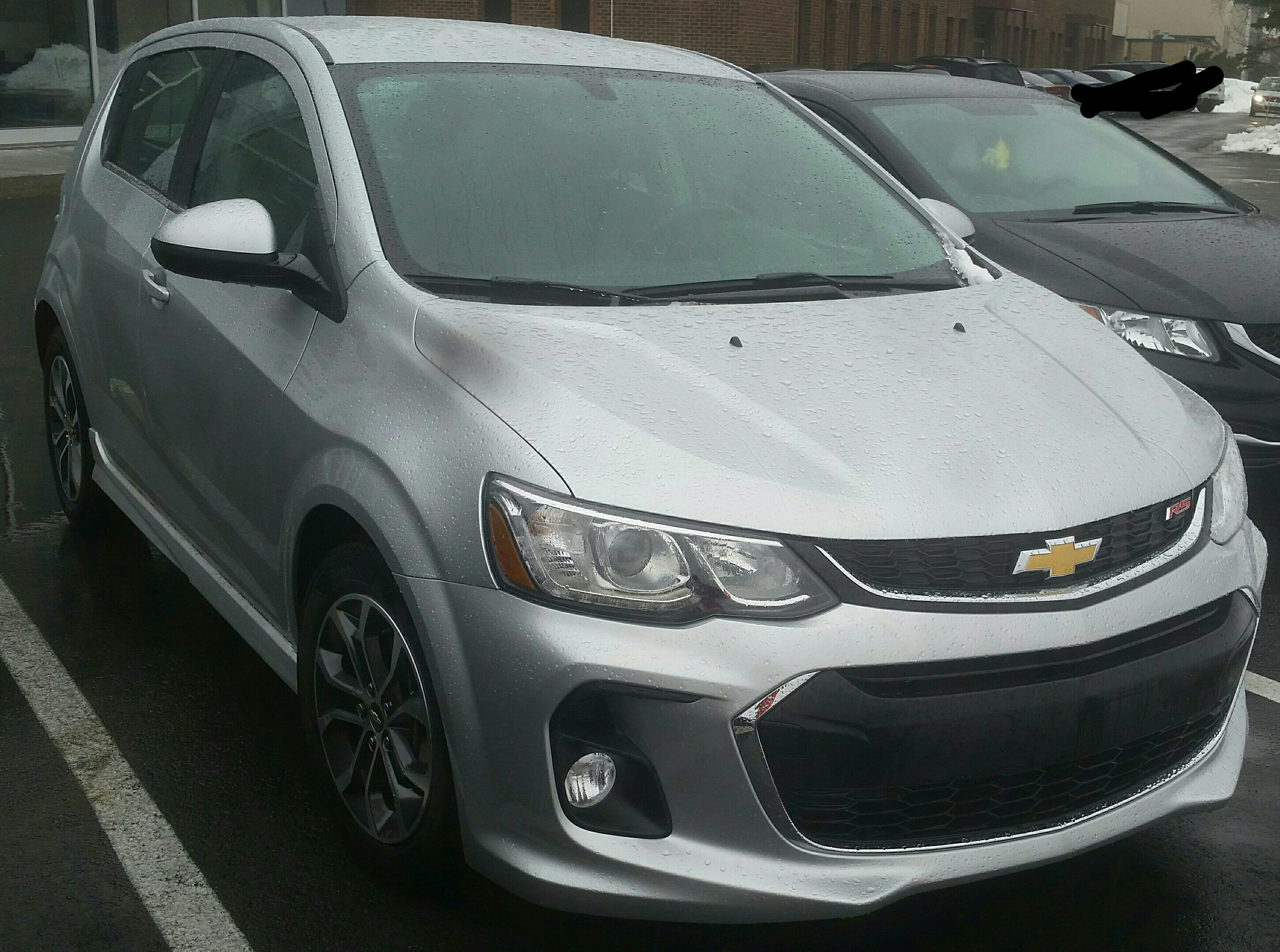
Chevrolet Sonic Hatchback

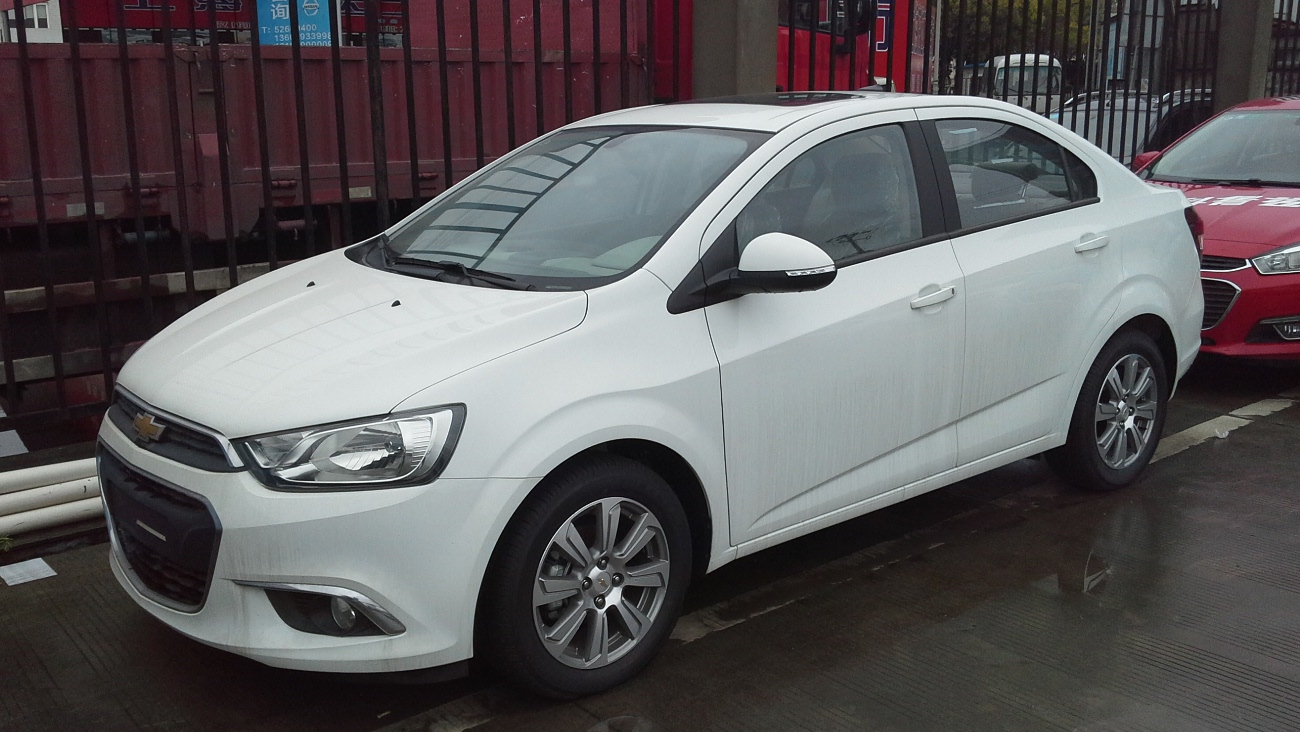
Chevrolet Aveo (China)

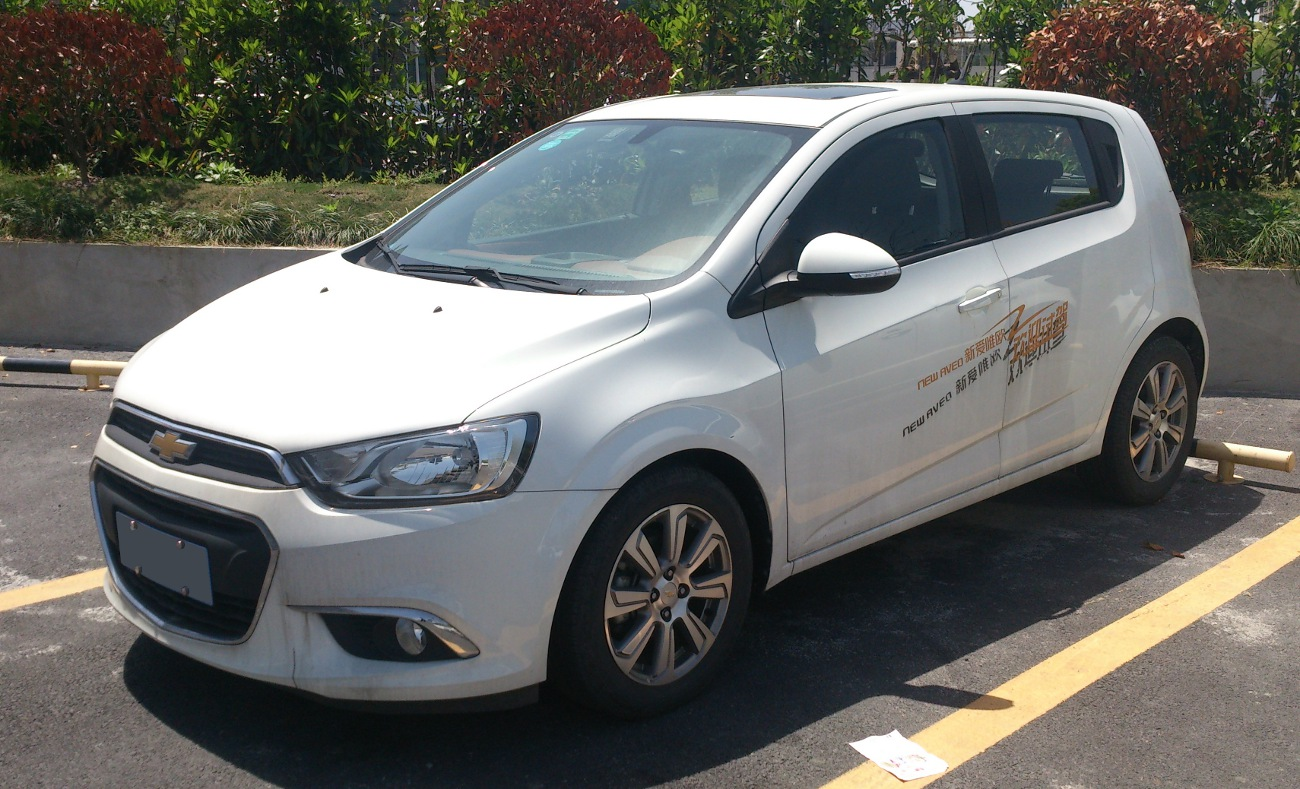
Chevrolet Aveo5 (China)

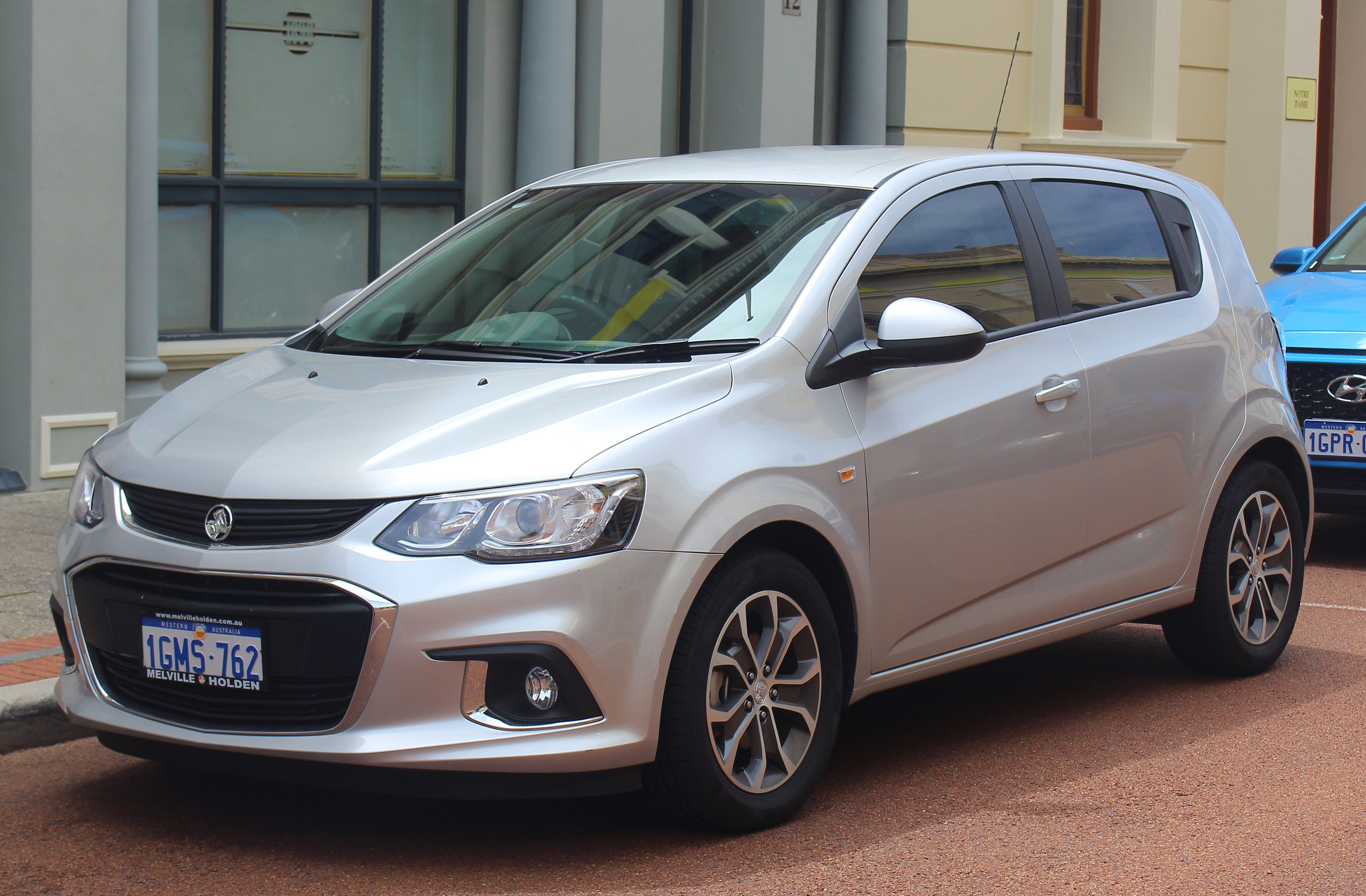
Holden Barina

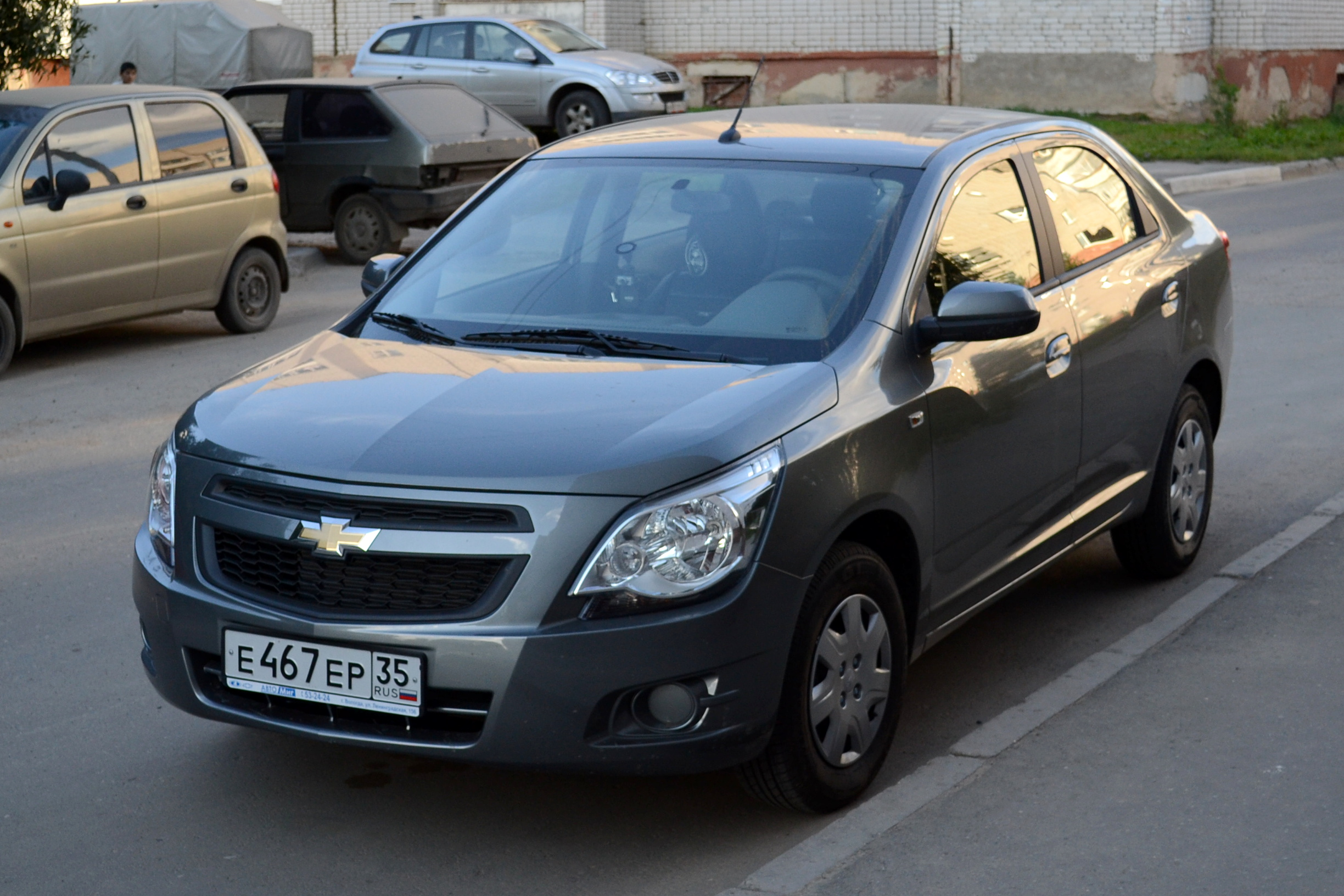
Chevrolet Cobalt

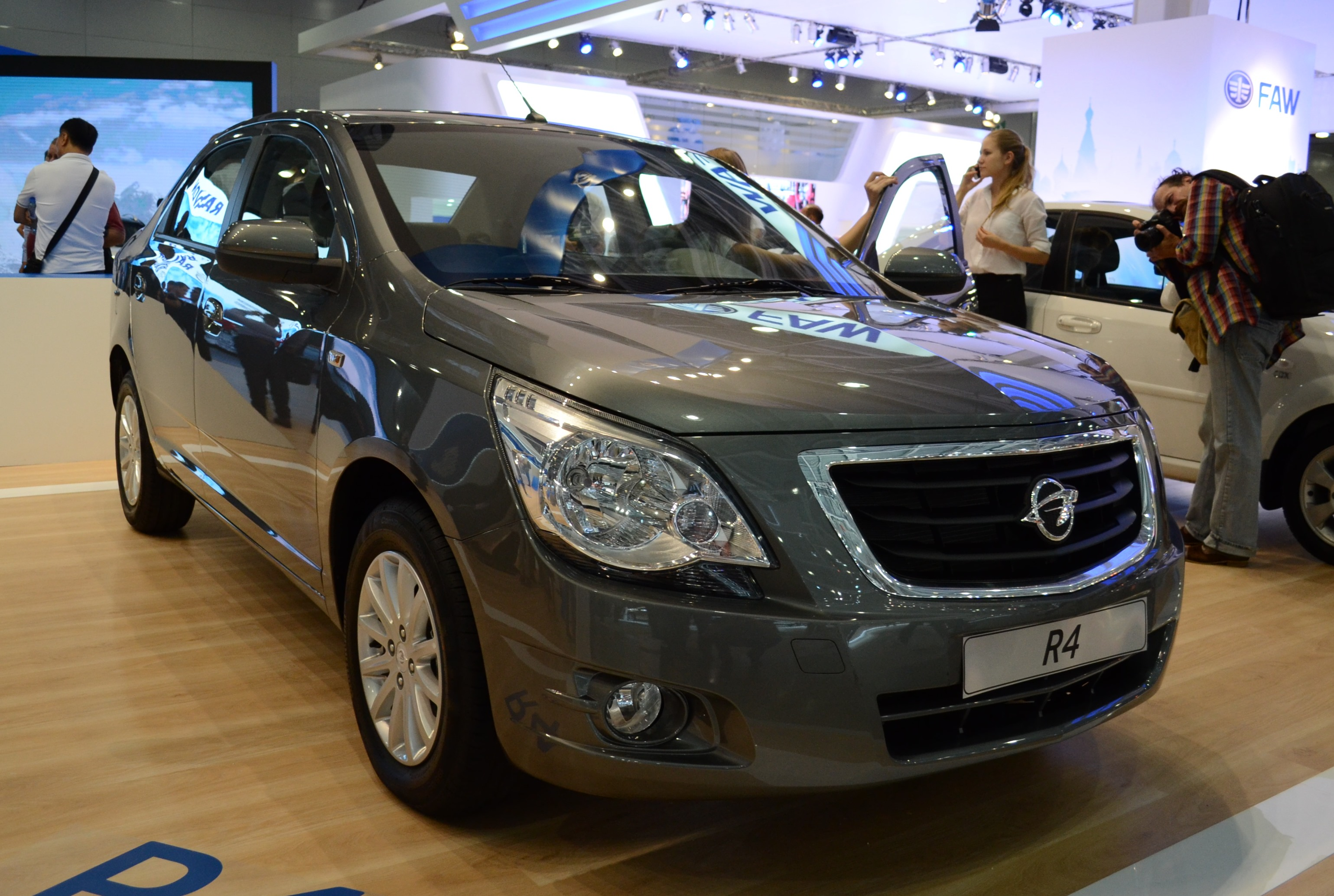
Ravon R4

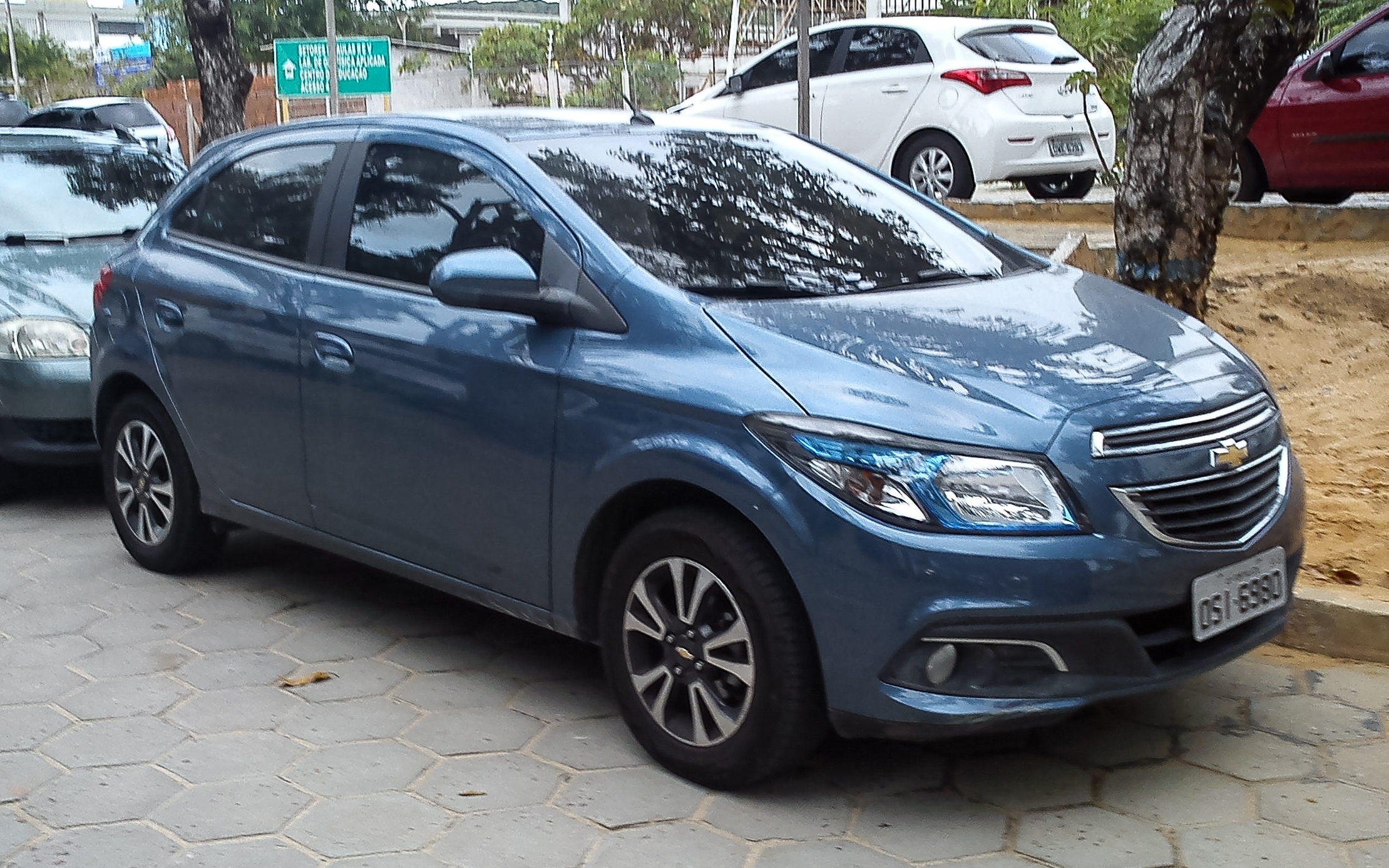
Chevrolet Onix

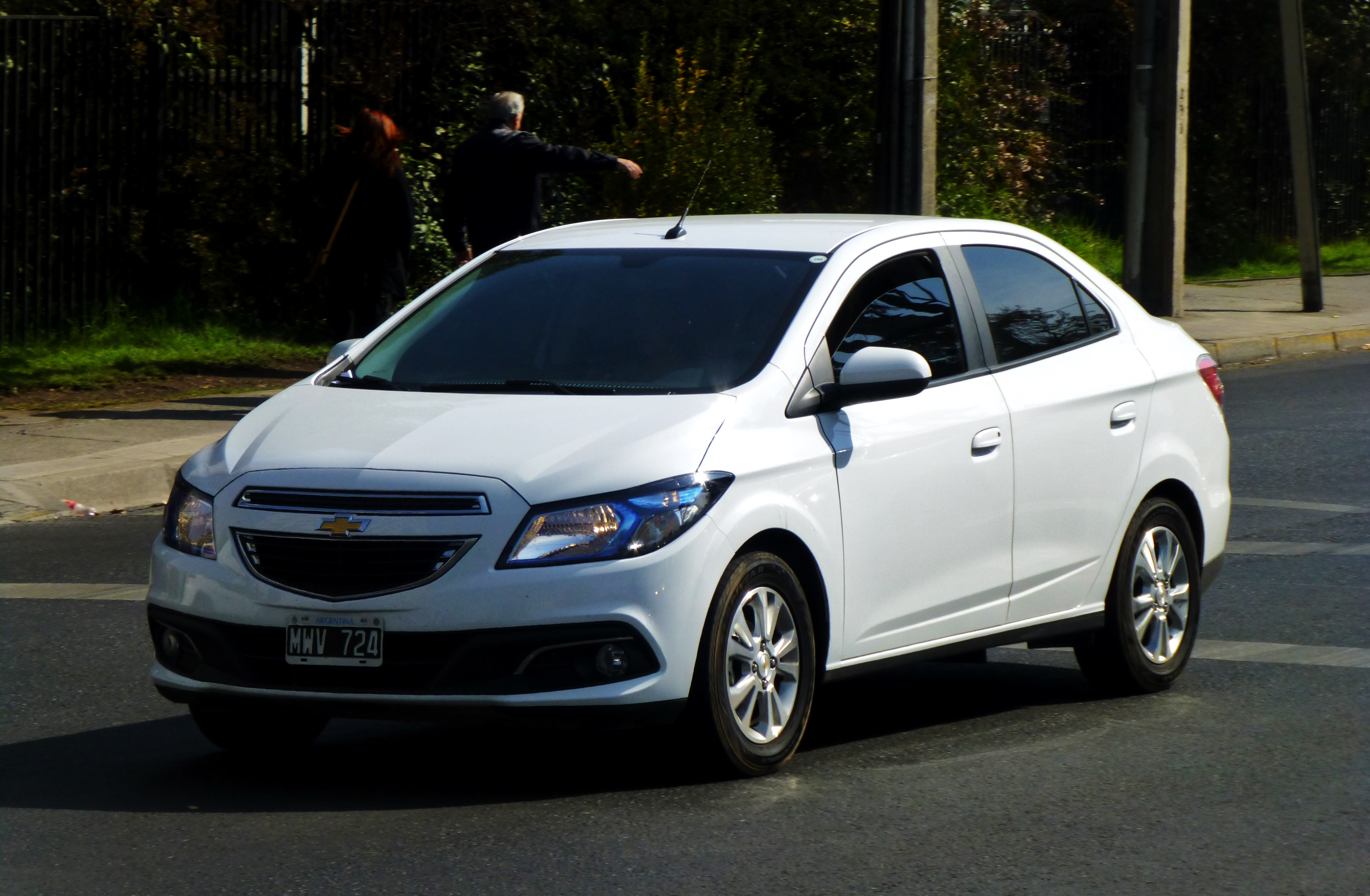
Chevrolet Prisma

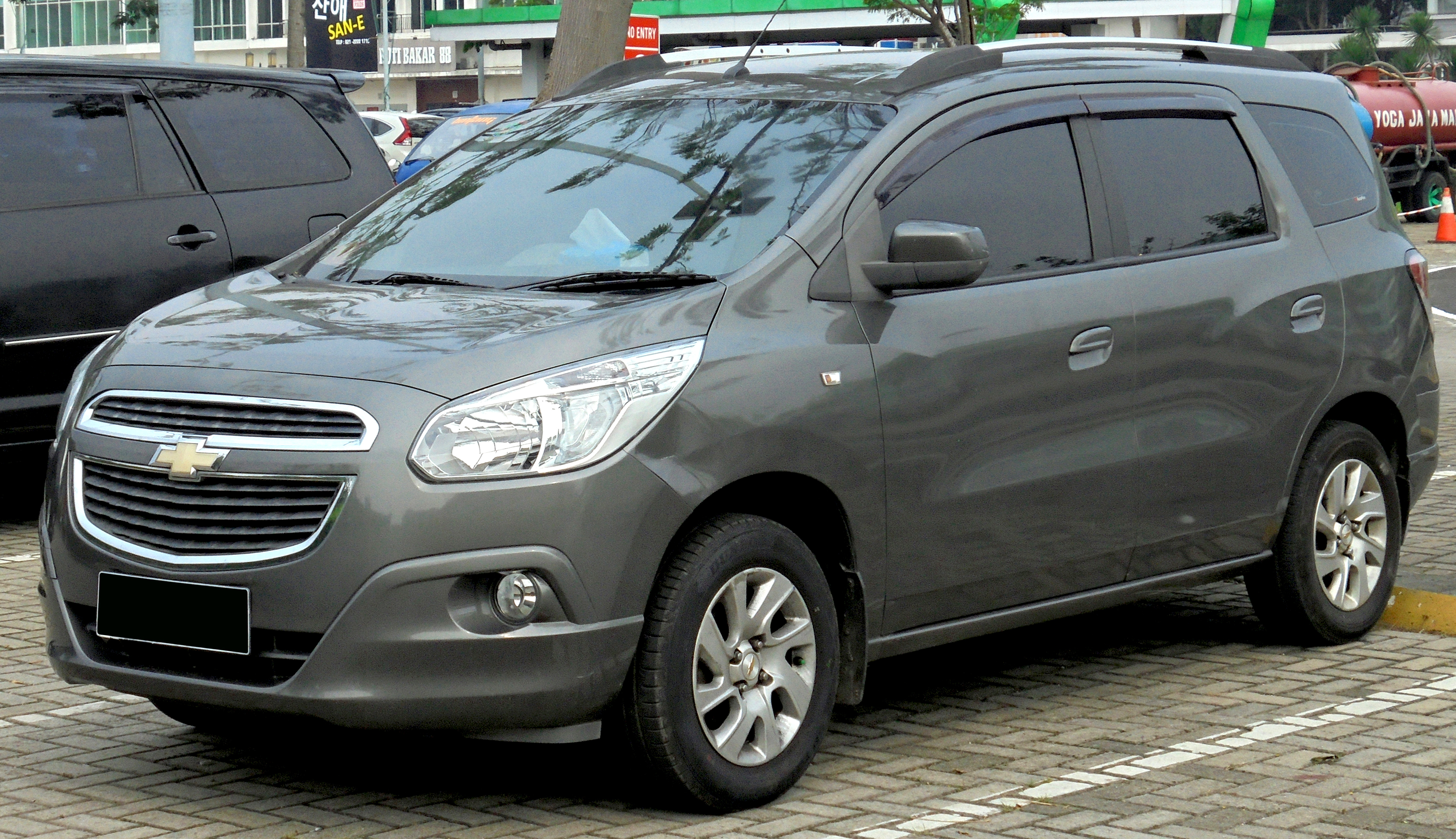
Chevrolet Spin

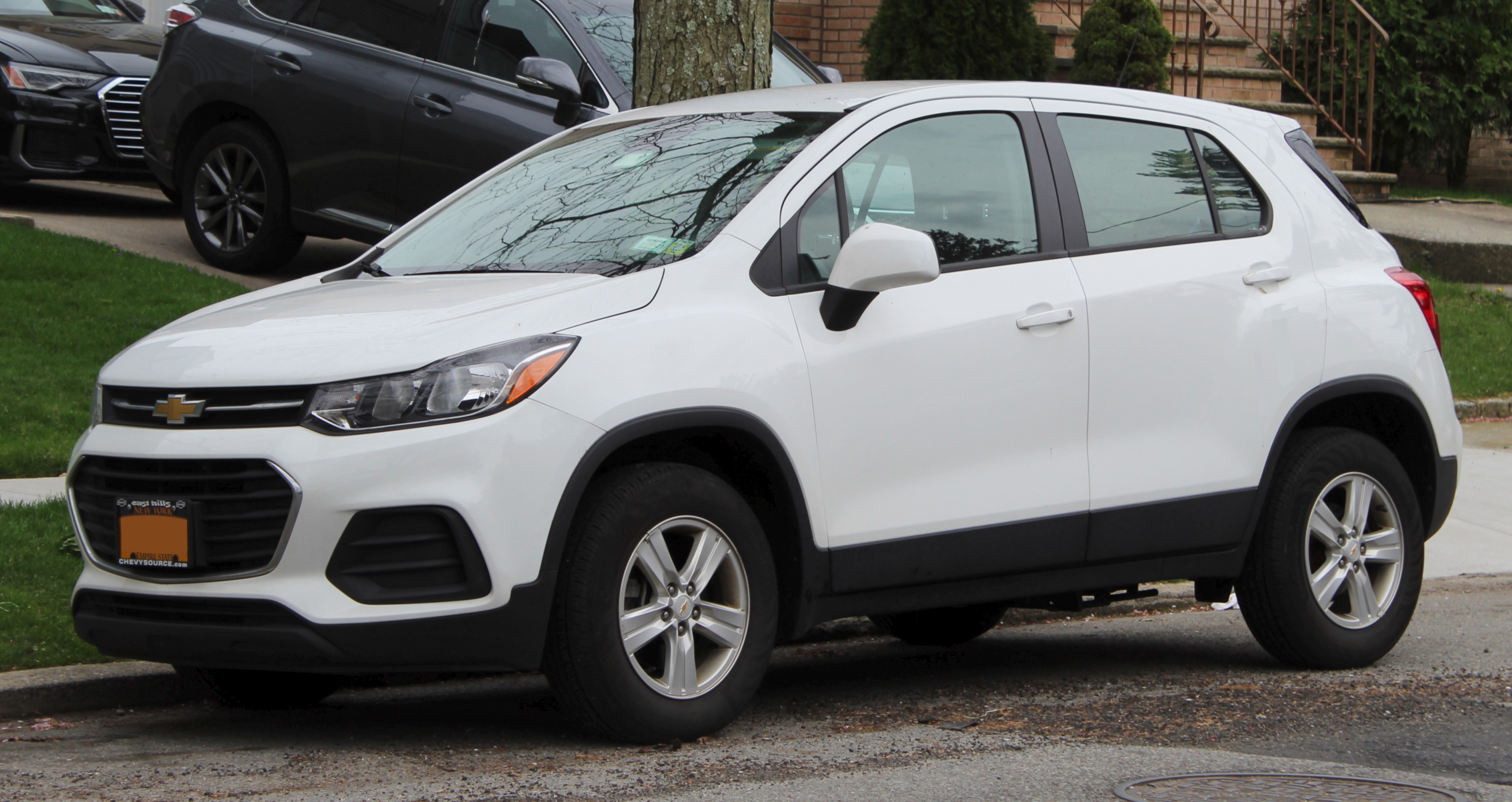
Chevrolet Trax/Chevrolet Tracker

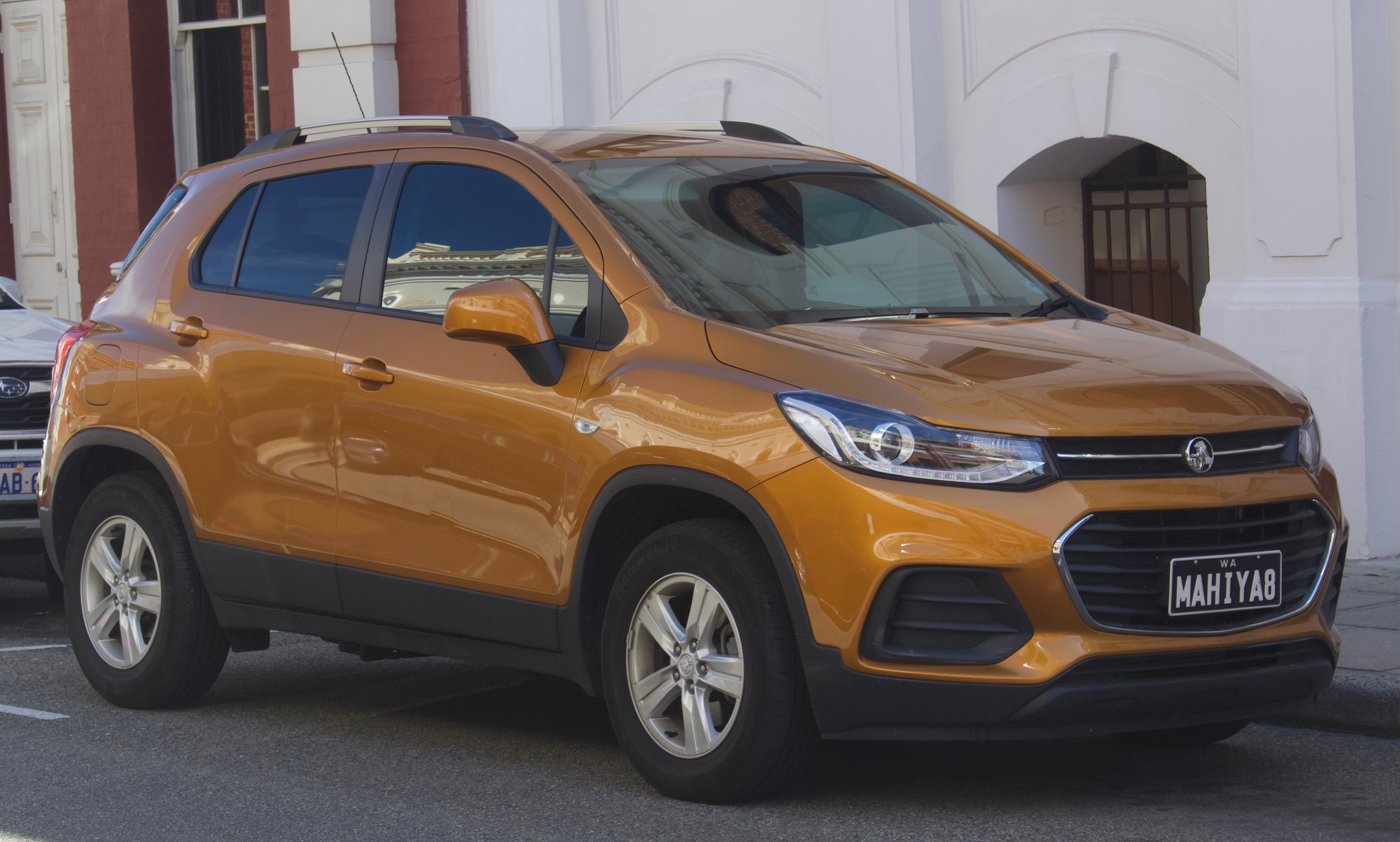
Holden Trax

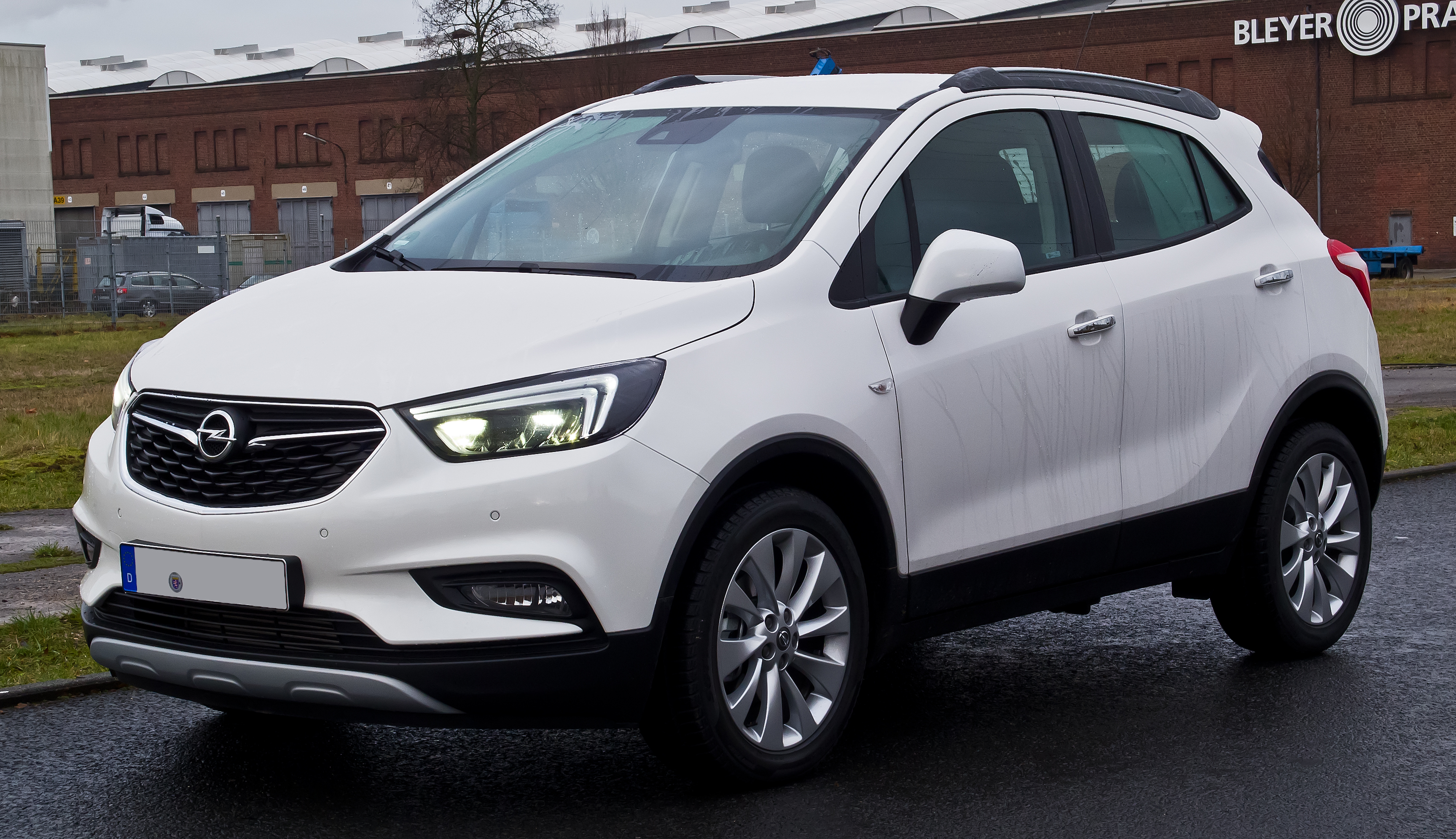
Opel Mokka X

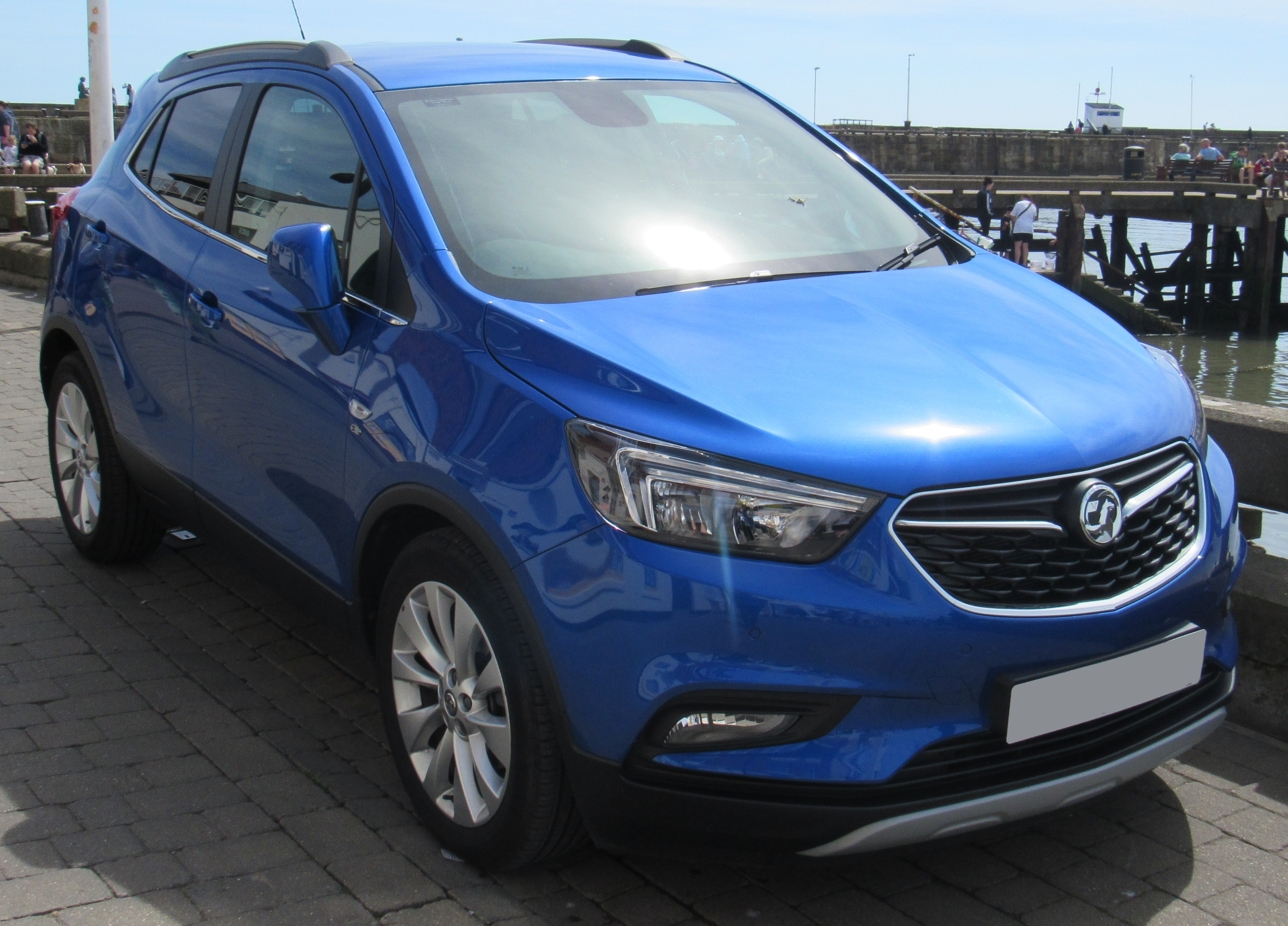
Vauxhall Mokka X

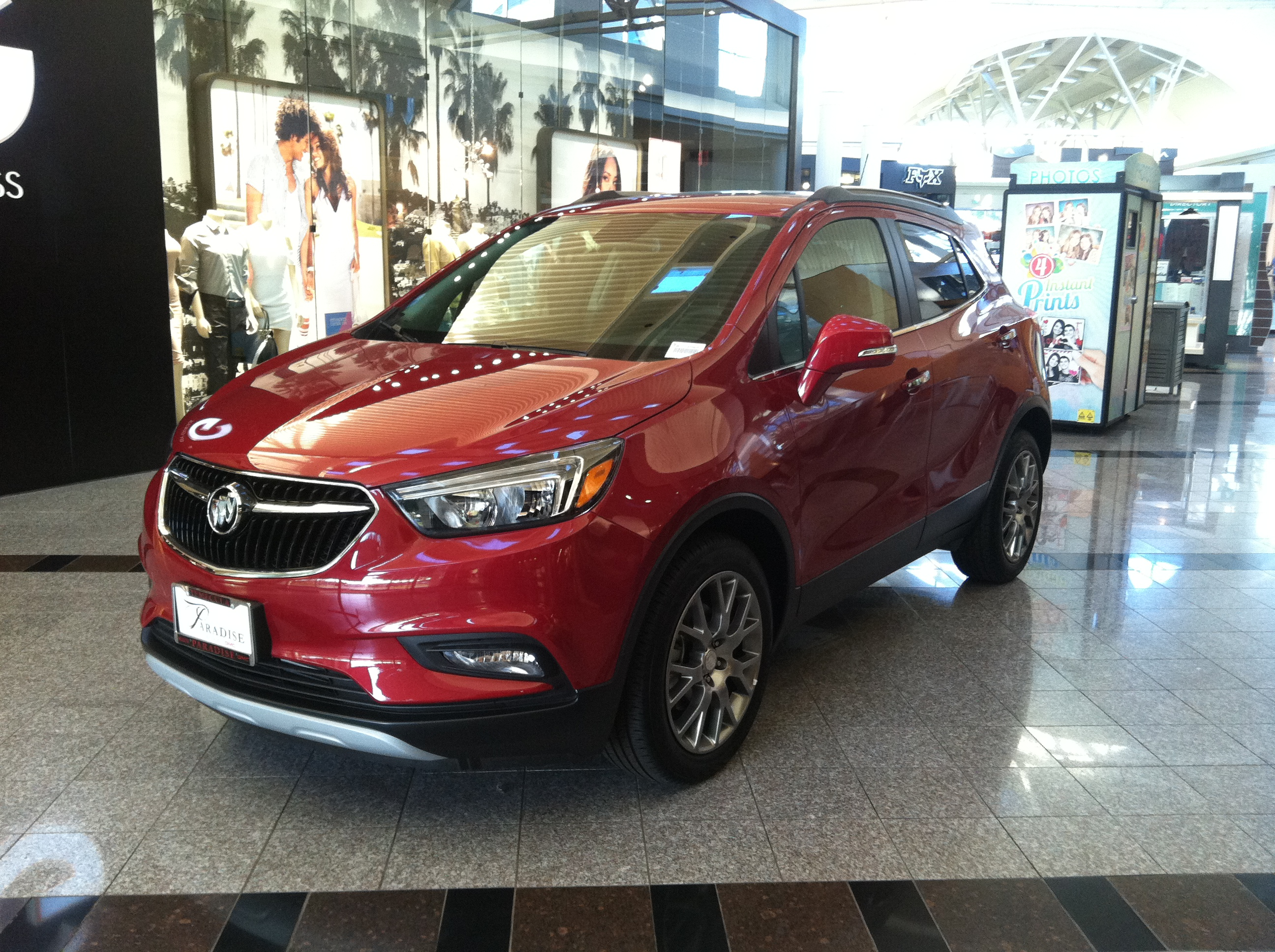
Buick Encore

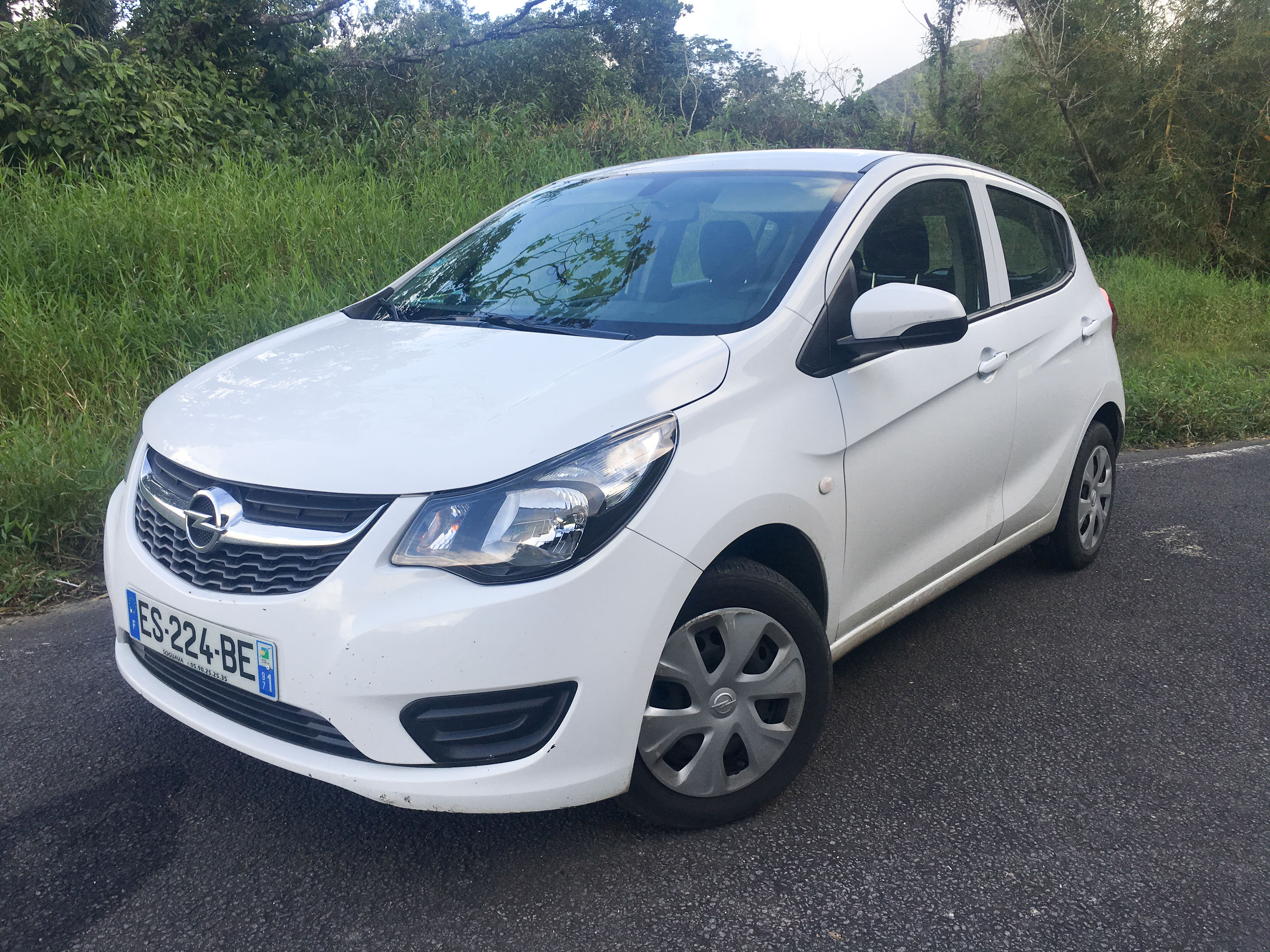
Opel Karl

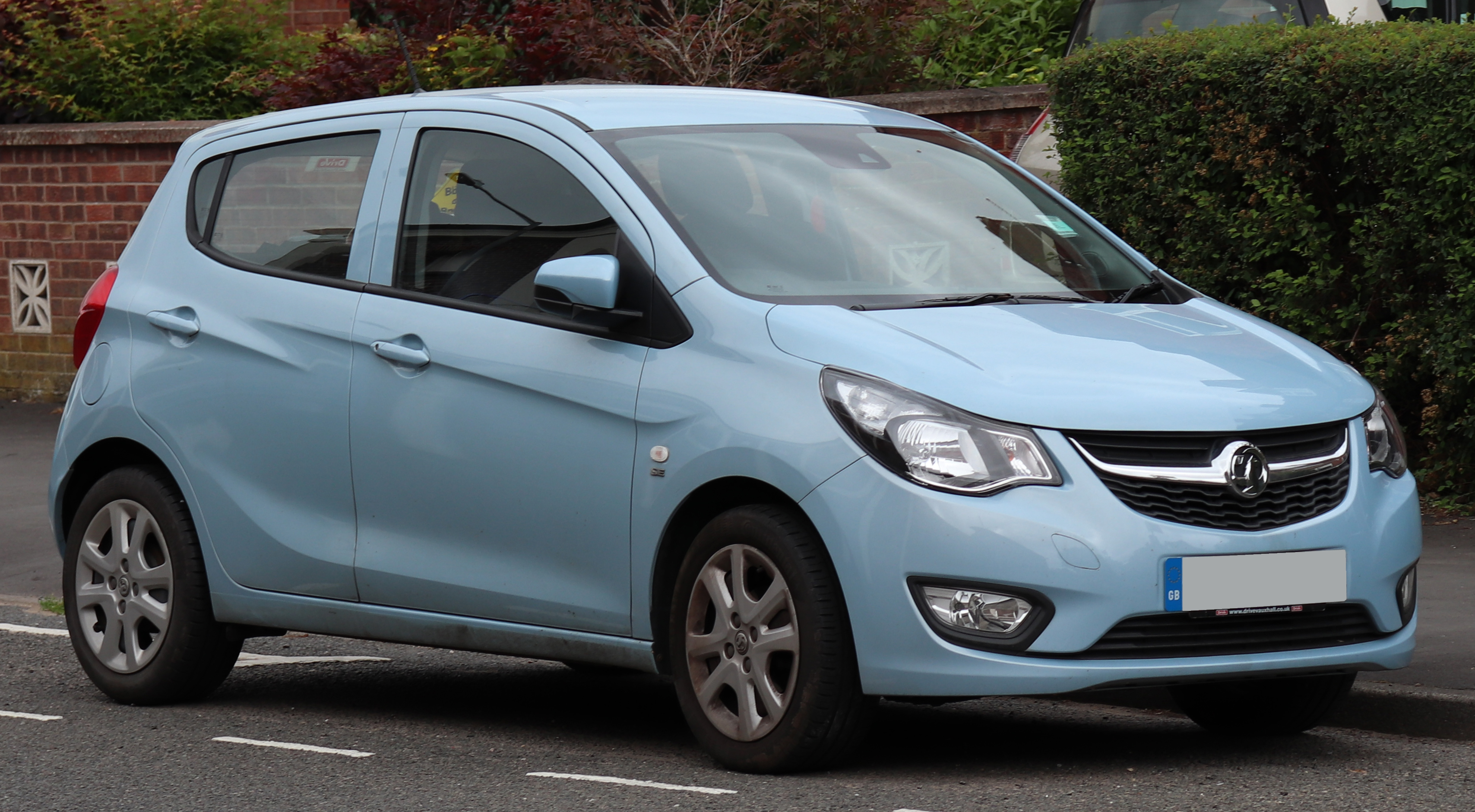
Vauxhall Viva

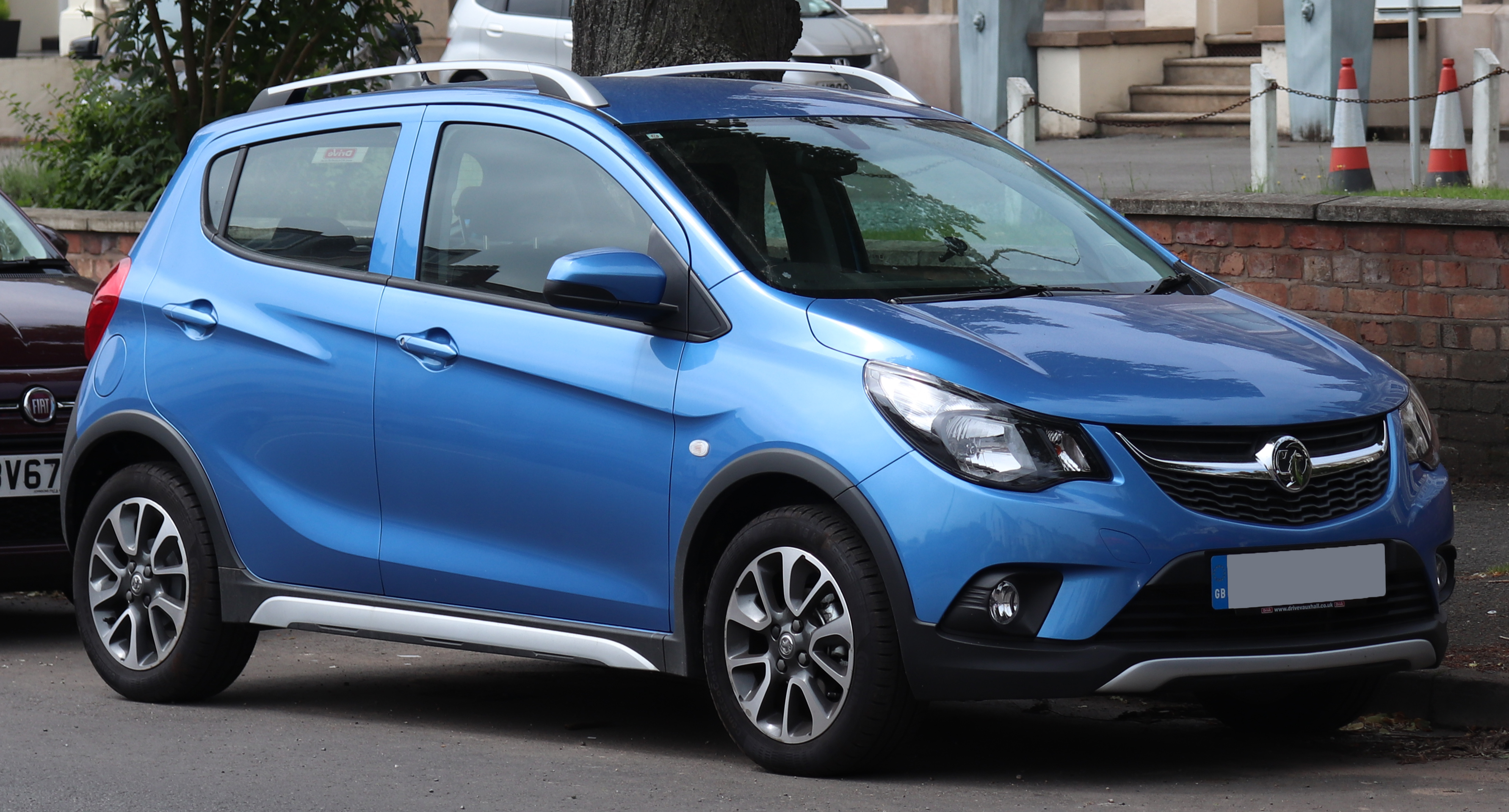
Vauxhall Viva Rocks

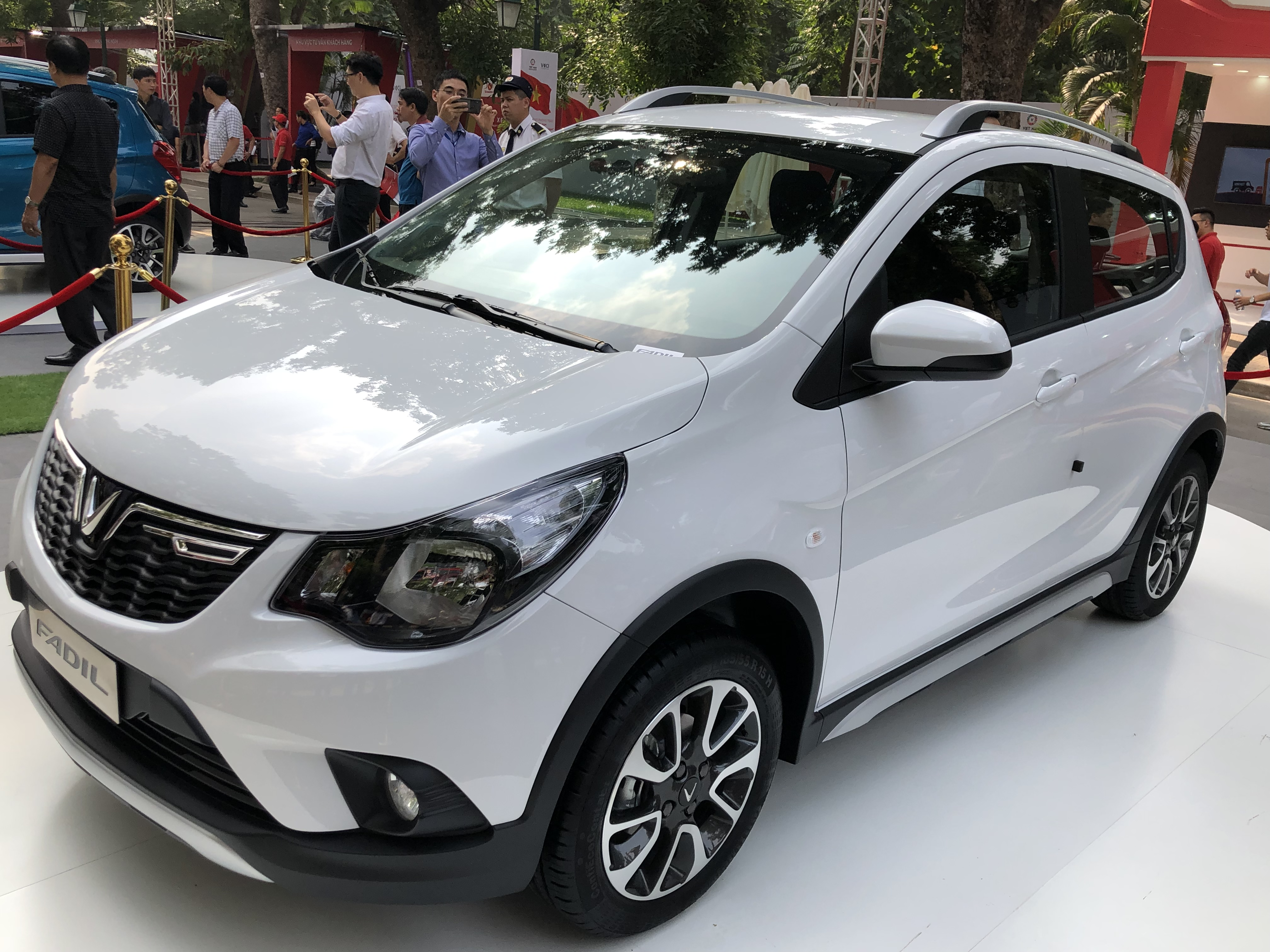
VinFast Fadil

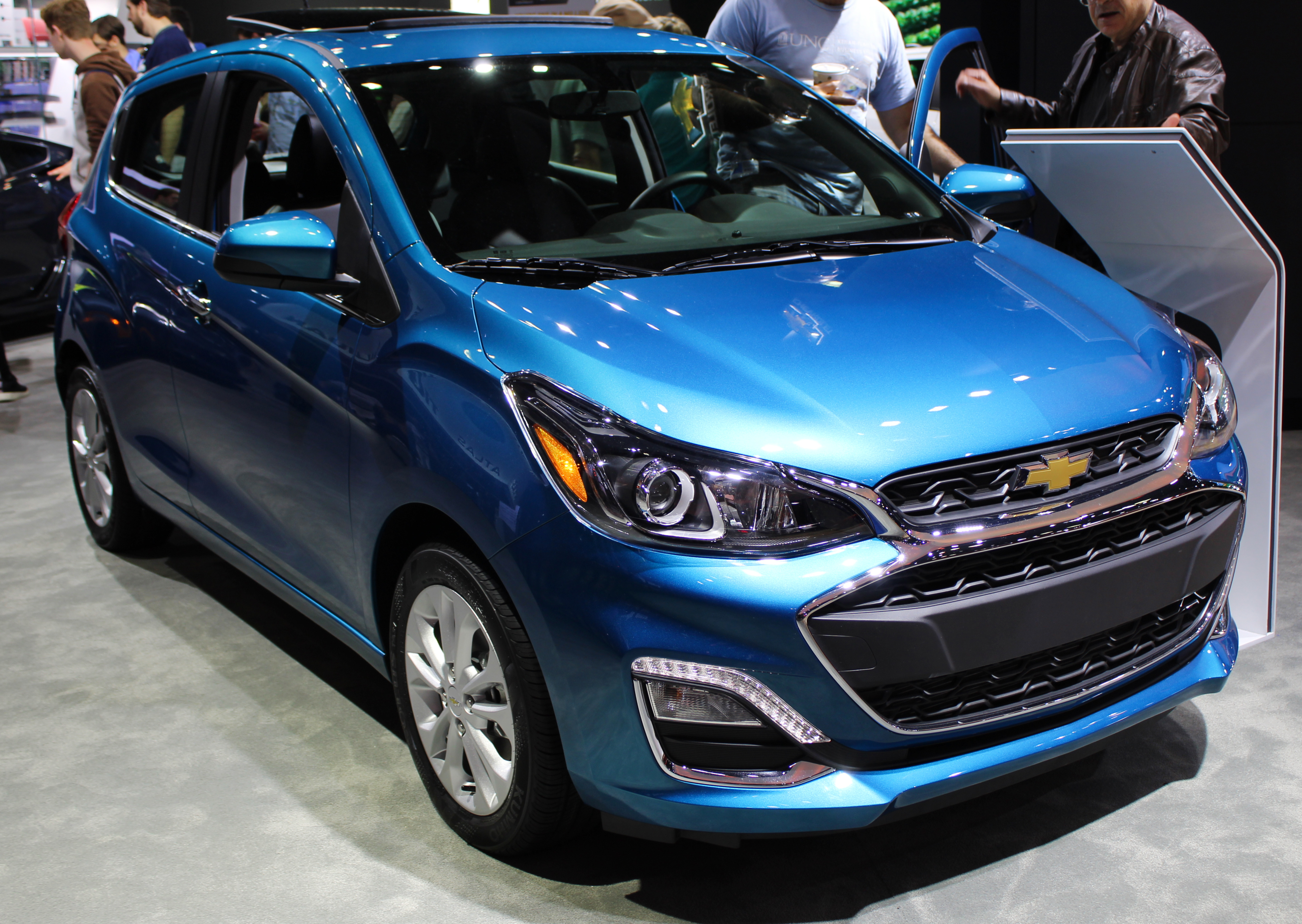
Chevrolet Spark

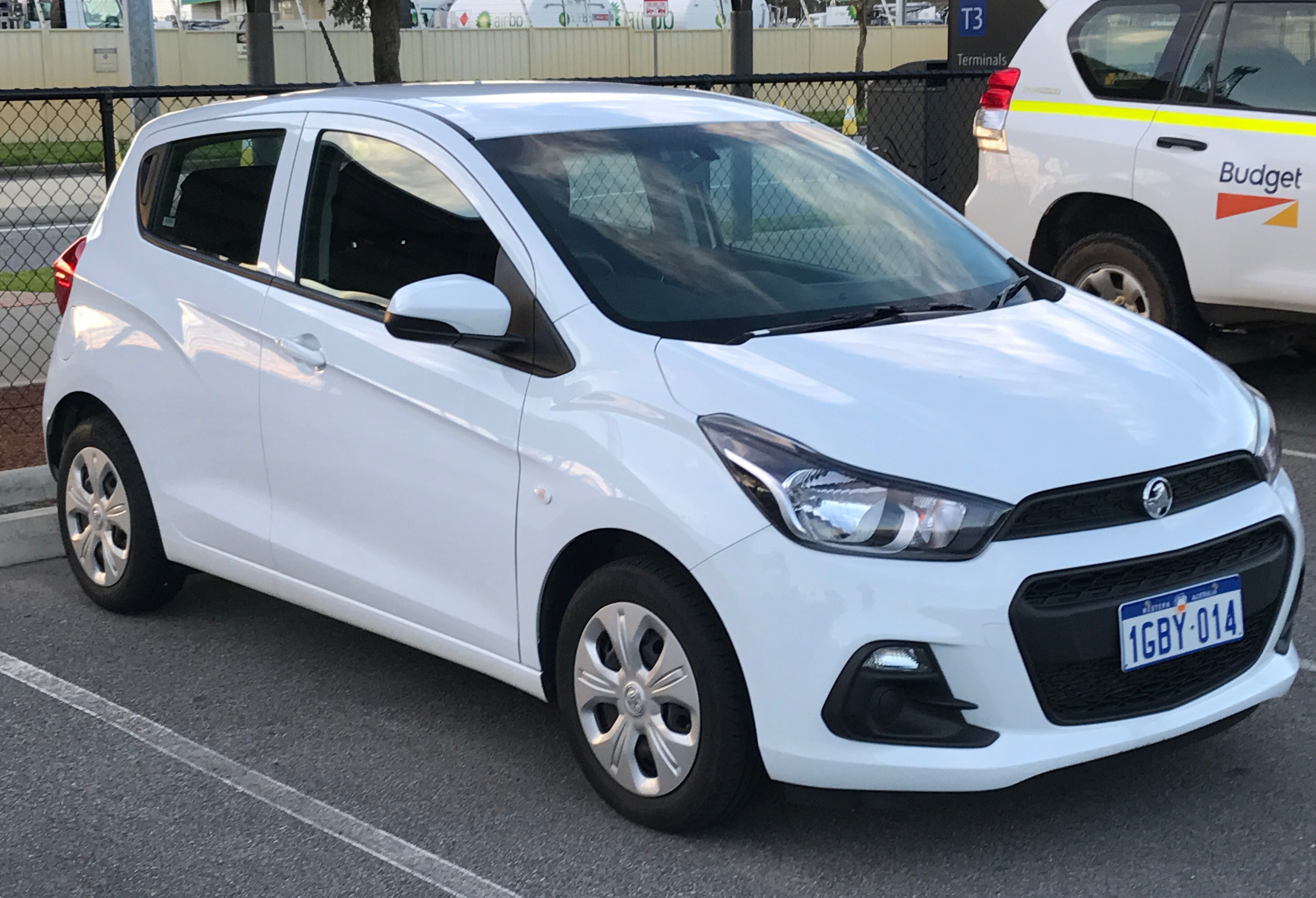
Holden Spark

Gamma II concept vehicles:

- 2010 Chevrolet Aveo RS concept car
- 2010 Cadillac Urban Luxury Concept
- 2010 GMC Granite

== See also ==
- List of General Motors platforms
