= Buick Electra E5 =

Battery electric mid-size crossover SUV

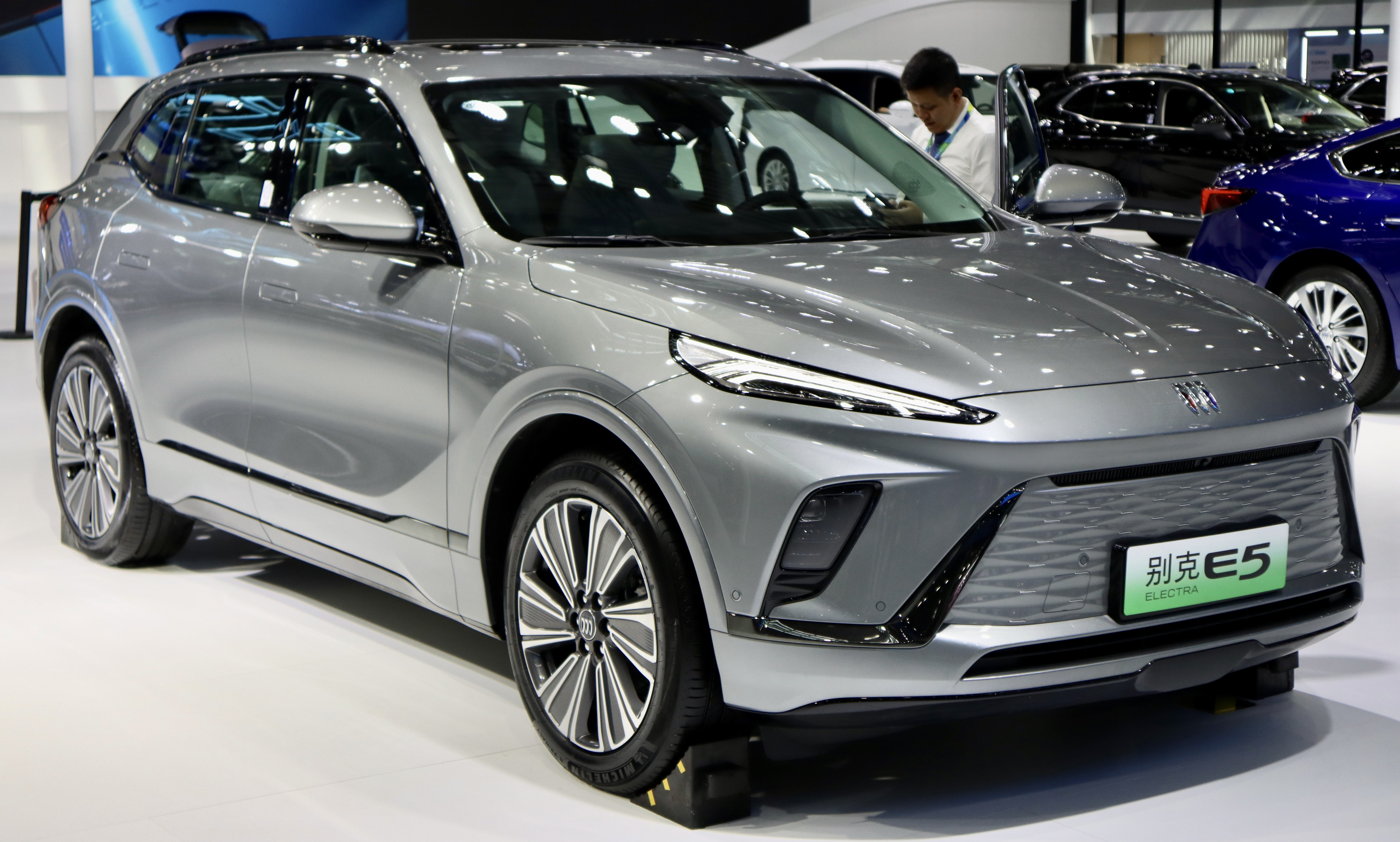

Overview
- Manufacturer: SAIC-GM
- Model code: B233
- Production: 2023–present
- Assembly: China: Wuhan (SAIC-GM)

Body and chassis
- Class: Mid-size crossover SUV
- Body style: 5-door SUV
- Layout: Front-motor, front-wheel-drive; Dual-motors, all-wheel-drive
- Platform: GM BEV3
- Related: Cadillac Optiq; Buick Electra E4; Chevrolet Equinox EV

Powertrain
- Electric motor: Permanent magnet motor
- Power output: 150–211 kW (204–287 PS; 201–283 hp)
- Battery: 65 kWh LFP Ultium; 68.4 kWh NMC Ultium; 79.7 kWh LFP Ultium
- Electric range: 515–620 km (320–385 mi)
- Plug-in charging: 11.5 kW (AC); 195 kW (DC)

Dimensions
- Wheelbase: 2,954 mm (116.3 in)
- Length: 4,892 mm (192.6 in)
- Width: 1,905 mm (75.0 in)
- Height: 1,681–1,684 mm (66.2–66.3 in)
- Curb weight: 2,570 kg (5,666 lb)

The Buick Electra E5 is a battery electric mid-size crossover SUV manufactured by SAIC-GM under the Buick brand.

== History ==
The Electra E5 is the first product of the Buick Electra electric vehicle series and was introduced during 2023 Auto Shanghai. It was produced by the SAIC-GM joint venture in China since its launch on April 23, 2023. Based on GM's BEV3 platform, it is equipped with GM Ultium batteries shared with other GM battery electric vehicles, and will be equipped with the Super Cruise driving assistance system.

It is the first vehicle under the Electra sub-brand of Buick electric vehicles, a name reused from the Buick Electra produced between 1959 and 1990.

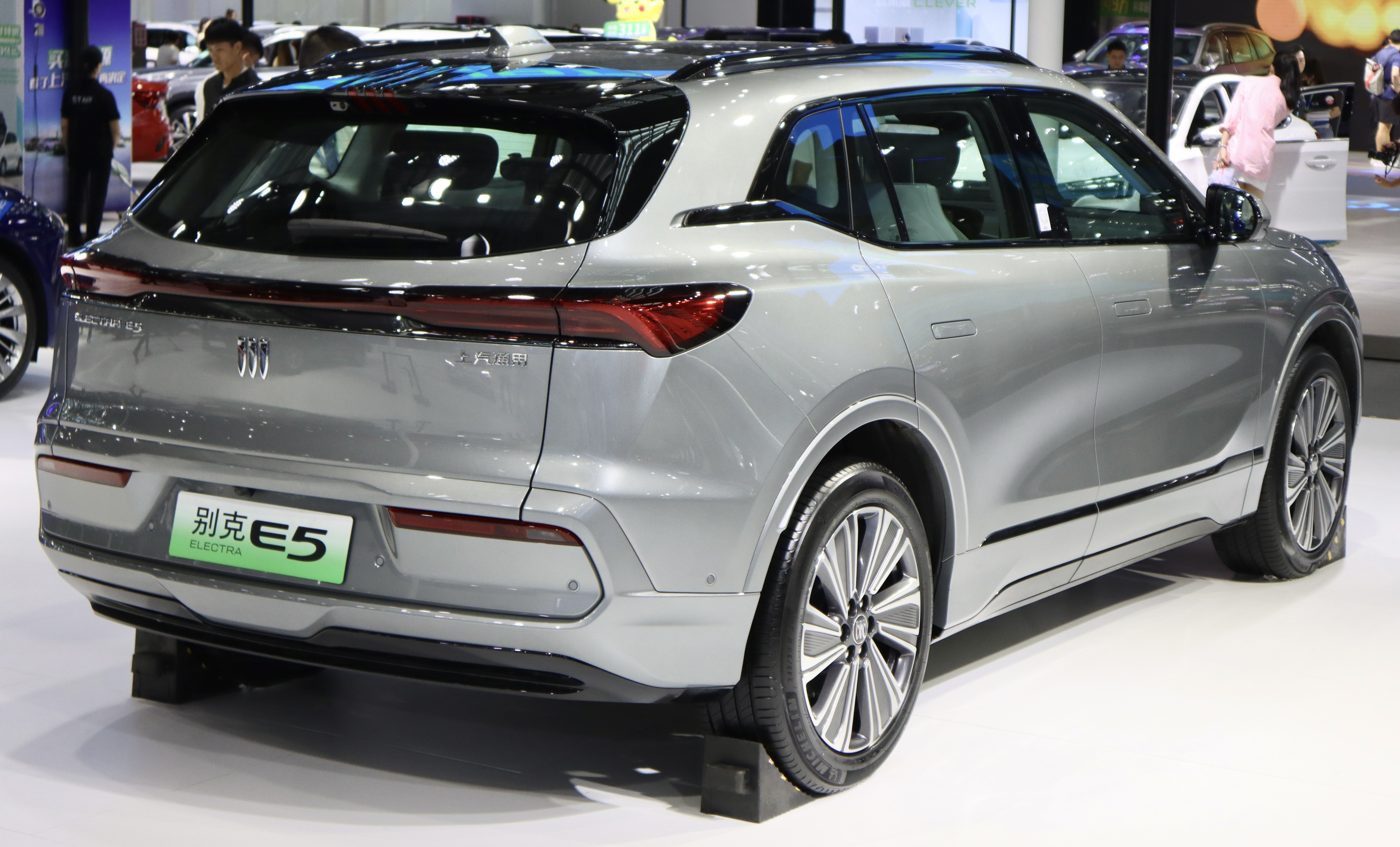
Rear view

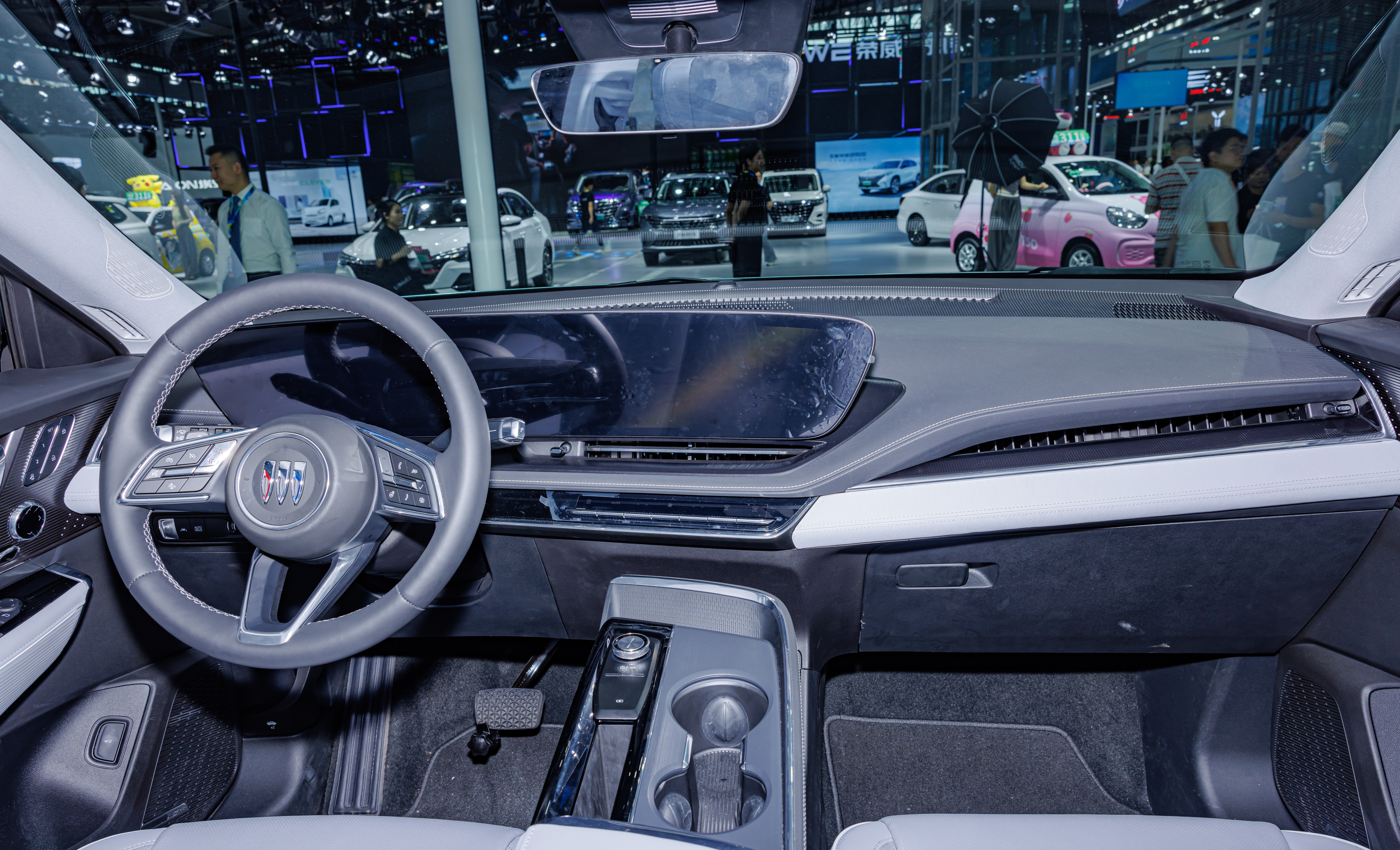
Interior

=== 2025 facelift ===
The Electra E5 received a facelift in 2025.

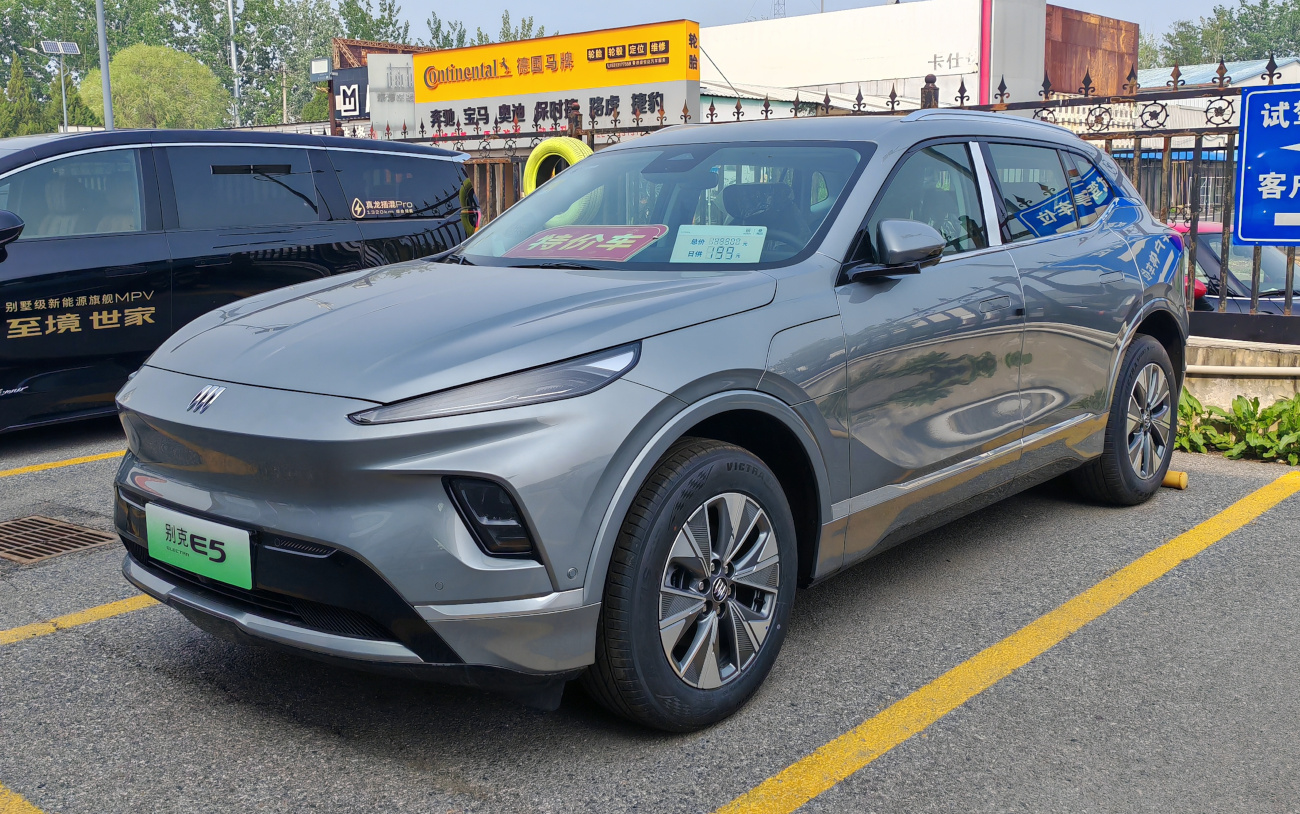
Facelift

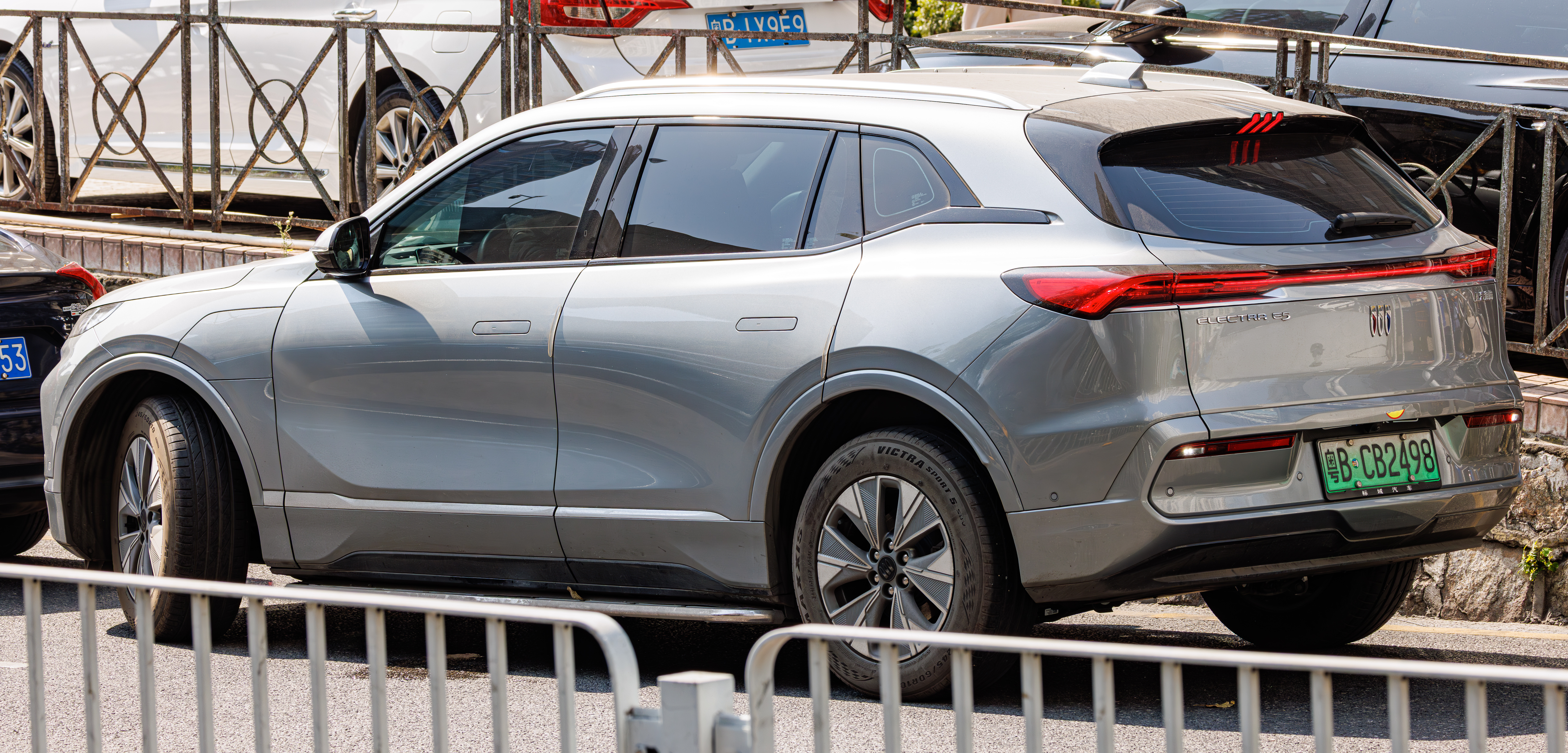
Facelift (Rear view)

== Specifications ==
The Electra E5 is equipped with GM Ultium batteries and the Super Cruise driver assistance system. The model is powered by a 241 hp (180 kW; 244 PS) electric motor with 330 N⋅m (243 lb⋅ft) peak torque, which accelerates the vehicle from 0–100 km/h (62 mph) in 7.5 seconds, and to a 180 km/h (112 mph) top speed. Its battery can charge from 30–80% in 19 minutes.

== Sales ==
Year	China
2023	14,087
2024	21,813
2025	13,608
