= Chevrolet Equinox EV =

Battery electric compact crossover SUV

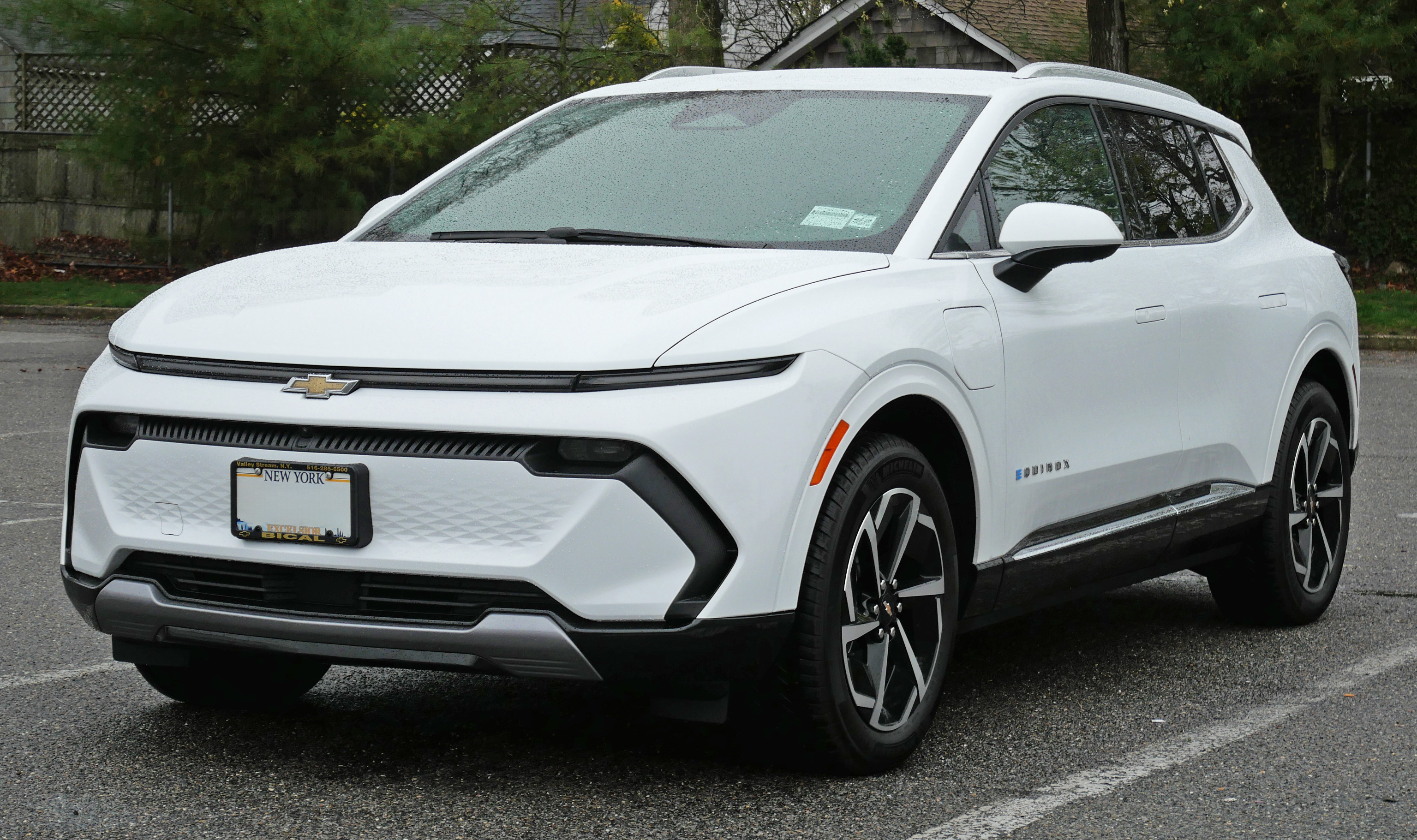
- 2025 Chevrolet Equinox EV (US)

Overview
- Manufacturer: General Motors
- Production: January 2024 – present
- Model years: 2024–present
- Assembly: Mexico: Ramos Arizpe, Coahuila (Ramos Arizpe Assembly)

Body and chassis
- Class: Compact crossover SUV
- Body style: 5-door SUV
- Layout: Front-motor, front-wheel-drive; Dual-motor, all-wheel-drive
- Platform: GM BEV3, GM Global B (“Vehicle Intelligence Platform”)
- Related: Acura ZDX (second generation); Buick Electra E4; Buick Electra E5; Cadillac Optiq; Chevrolet Blazer EV; Honda Prologue; Cadillac Lyriq

Powertrain
- Electric motor: Permanent magnet motor
- Power output: 220 or 300 hp (223 or 304 PS; 164 or 224 kW) (2025)
- Battery: Ultium lithium-ion; 85kWh; 288V
- Electric range: EPA 326 mi (525 km) (2025 FWD)
- Plug-in charging: 11.5 kW (Level 2 AC); 19.2 kW (Level 2 AC, Equinox 3RS); 150 kW (DC)

Dimensions
- Wheelbase: 116.3 in (2,954 mm)
- Length: 190.4 in (4,836 mm)
- Width: 75.4 in (1,915 mm)
- Height: 63.5 in (1,613 mm)

The Chevrolet Equinox EV is a battery electric compact crossover SUV manufactured by General Motors under the Chevrolet brand since 2024.

The Equinox EV was introduced in January 2022 in a set of images at the 2022 Consumer Electronics Show (CES) and was originally planned to go on sale in the late 2023 for the 2024 model year. Chevrolet dealers began receiving deliveries of the 2024 Equinox EV in May 2024.

The Equinox EV is built on GM’s BEV3 platform, featuring a design and underpinnings different from the ICE-powered Equinox.

Equinox EV’s electronics are built on GM’s Global B (“Vehicle Intelligence Platform”) architecture.

== Overview ==
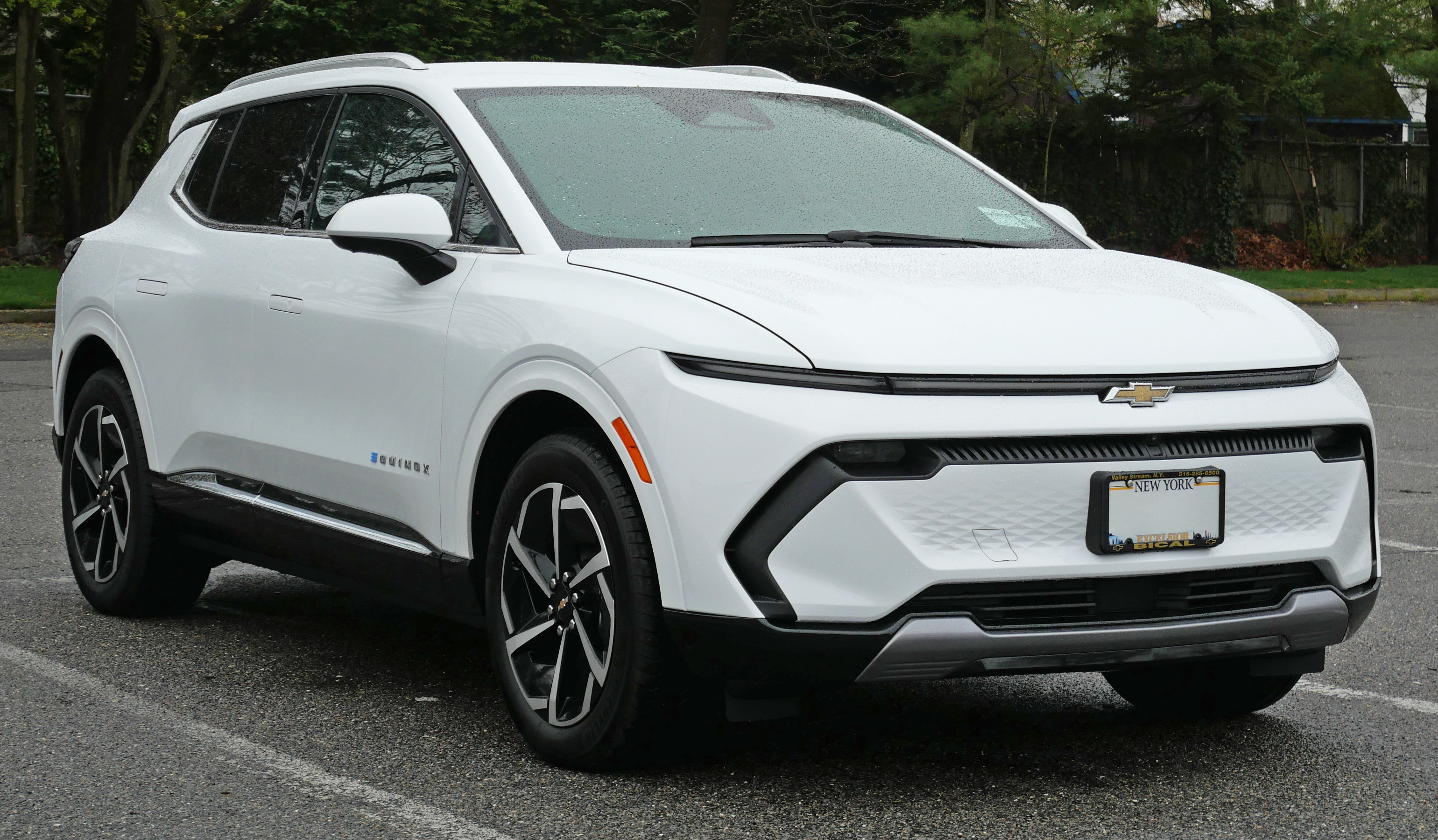
Front view

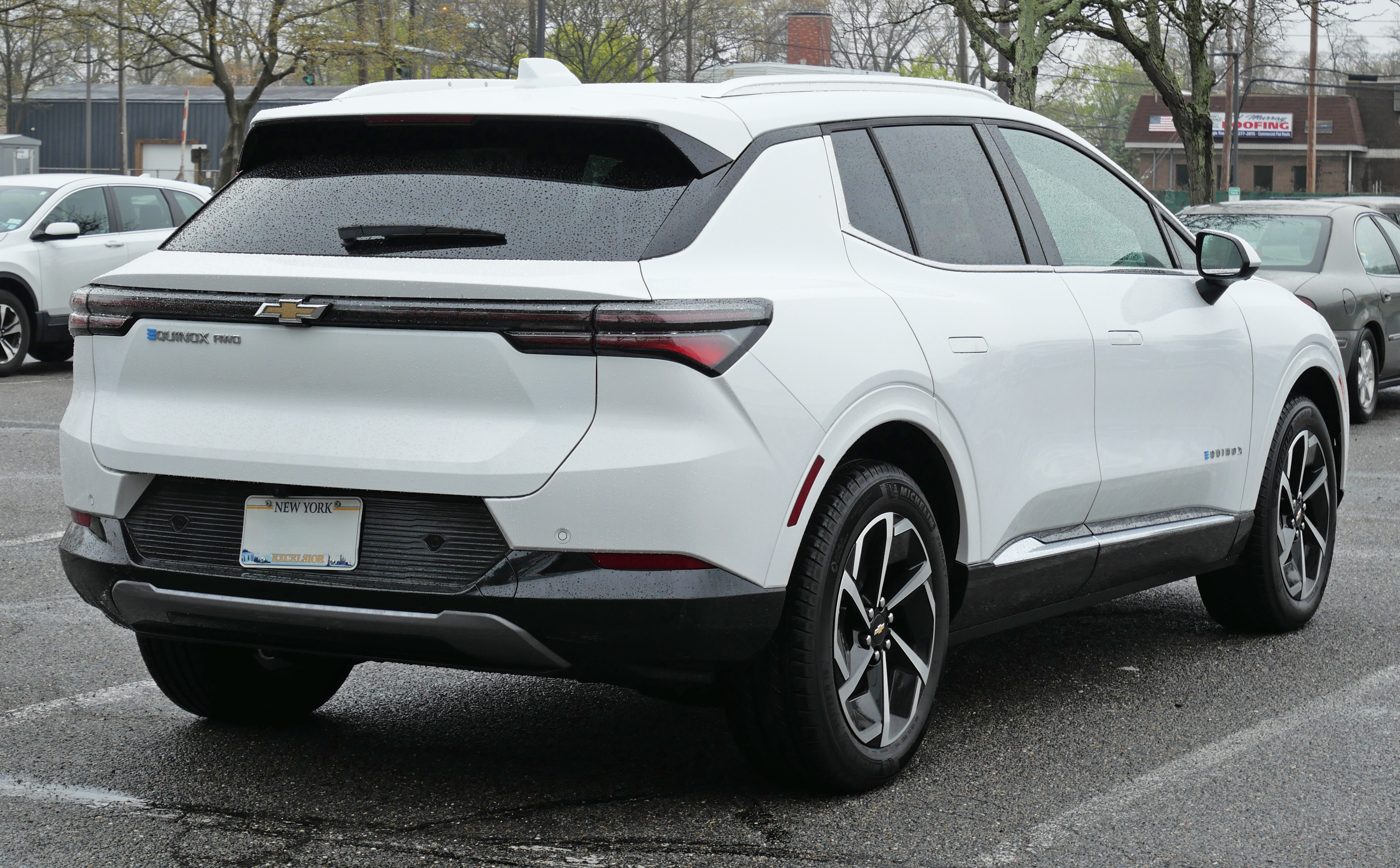
Rear view

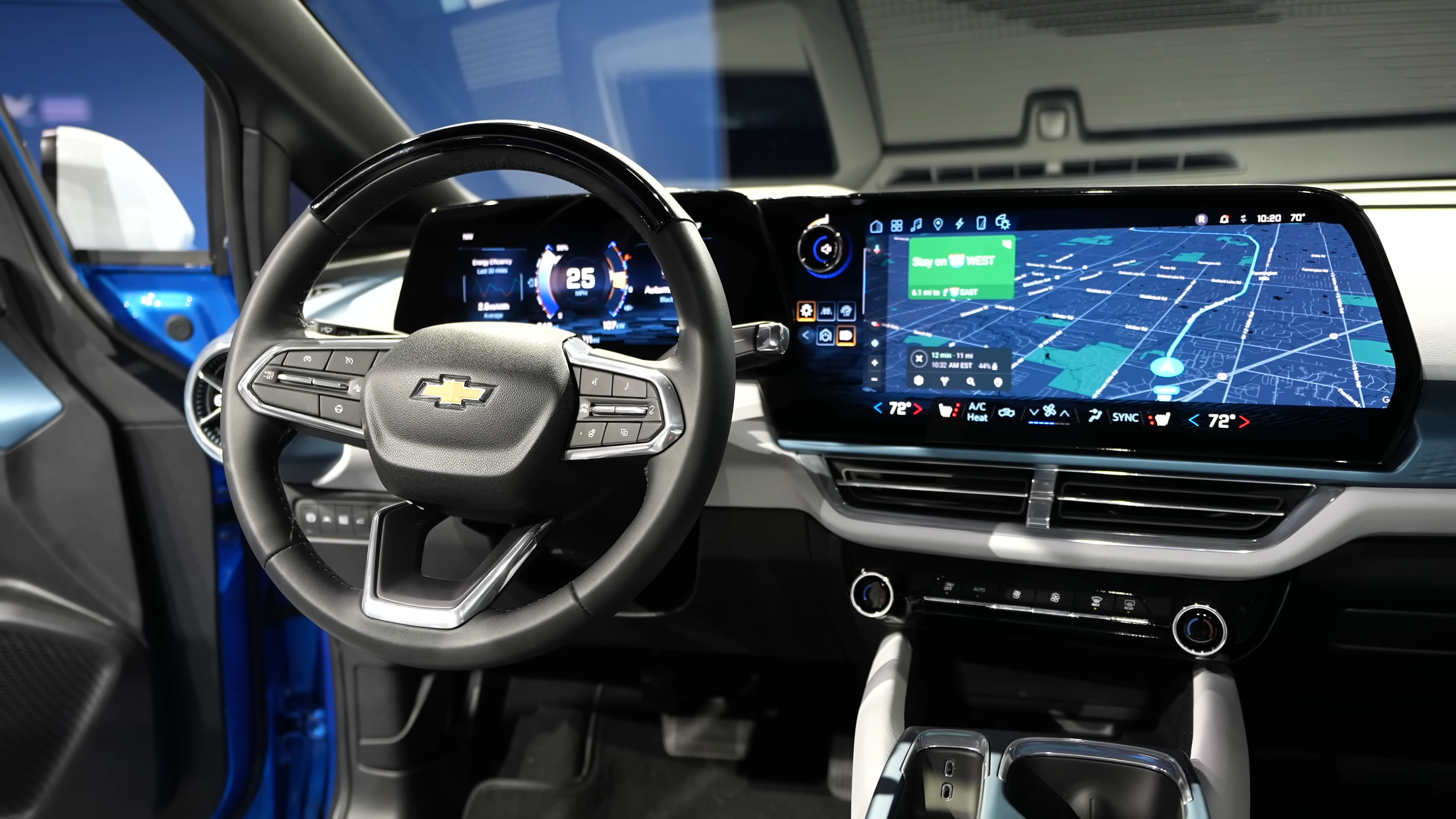
Interior

During its introduction, General Motors stated that Equinox EV would have a starting price of around US$30,000 in the United States and would be offered in various LT and RS trim levels.

Trim levels were detailed in September 2022. The 2024 base 1LT trim was to have an estimated range of 250 mi (400 km), and produce 210 hp (213 PS; 157 kW) and 242 lb⋅ft (328 N⋅m; 33.5 kg⋅m) torque, but GM never actually produced the 2024 1LT trim. Non-base 2024 trims were 2LT, 3LT, 2RS and 3RS.

Chevrolet began manufacturing the 2024 Equinox EV in January 2024 at its Ramos Arizpe plant in Mexico. Chevrolet dealers began receiving deliveries of the 2024 Equinox EV in May 2024.

The Equinox EV was introduced at Auto Beijing in China in May 2024. It was intended to be produced locally by SAIC-GM. However, production plans were halted, and the model was never sold in China as GM retired the Chevrolet brand from China in 2025.

The Equinox EV is equipped with GM Ultium batteries which are shared with many other GM battery electric vehicles, including the similar but larger Chevrolet Blazer EV. A larger battery with 300 mi (480 km) range was to be optional on the 2024 1LT, and standard on 2LT, 3LT, 2RS and 3RS. For the 2025 model year, all trims use this larger battery, which provides an EPA-estimated range of 319 mi (513 km) for all front wheel drive versions.

All trim levels have optional all-wheel drive, with dual motors producing 290 hp (294 PS; 216 kW) and 346 lb⋅ft (469 N⋅m; 47.8 kg⋅m) torque, with an estimated range of 280 mi (450 km).

A V2L (vehicle-to-load) system was to be optional for the 2024 3RS trim level. However, GM deferred this capability to the 2025 model year, and as of September 2024 it remains unavailable even on 2025 vehicles. The option later become available in 2025.

Cargo space is rated at 57.2 cu ft (1,620 L), which is nearly 7 cubic feet less than the ICE-powered Equinox due to its sleeker exterior design. No front cargo space ("frunk") is available due to the use of a front-motor layout, also the hood houses propulsion systems and electronic systems too.

== Model years ==
=== 2025 model year ===
For the 2025 model year, there are only two trims, LT and RS, each with many available options. It also provides increased power output: either 220 hp (223 PS; 164 kW) and 242 lb⋅ft (328 N⋅m; 33.5 kg⋅m) (FWD) or 300 hp (304 PS; 224 kW) and 348 lb⋅ft (472 N⋅m; 48.1 kg⋅m) of torque (AWD). The 2025 Equinox EV also provides increased range & MPGe: either 326 mi (525 km) with 117 City / 99 Highway / 108 Combined MPGe (FWD) or 307 mi (494 km) with 112 City / 93 Highway / 103 Combined MPGe (AWD). It also incorporates significantly fewer parts imported from China to reduce geopolitical risks. GM began producing the 2025 model year of Equinox EV on August 26, 2024.

=== 2026 model year ===
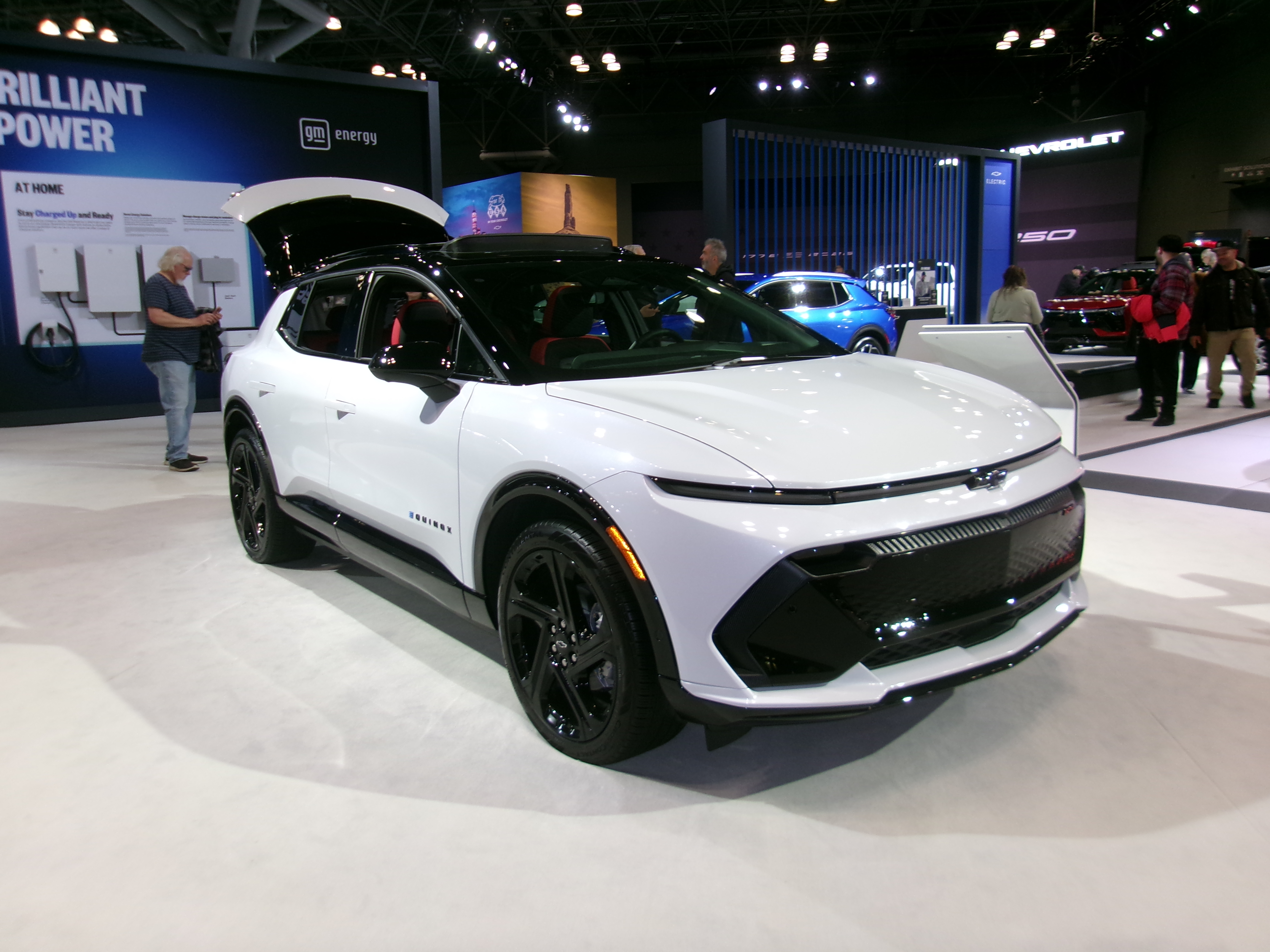
2026 Equinox EV

For model year 2026, Equinox EV continues to use the CCS1/J1772 charging interface. All GM electric vehicles (except the Spark EV) gained access to the Tesla Supercharger network in September 2024. GM expects to begin production of model year 2026 on Monday, July 14, 2025, with dealer order books opening up on Friday, May 30, 2025.

=== 2027 model year ===
For model years 2027 and beyond, Equinox EV will use the NACS/J3400 charging interface.

== Insurance ==
An August 2025 study by Mercury Insurance found that Equinox EV was the 2nd most affordable electric vehicle to insure in the United States.

== Sales ==
Despite not reaching dealers until May 2024, the Equinox EV became GM's best-selling electric vehicle in its first year.

Yearly sales
| Year | US | Canada | Mexico |
|---|---|---|---|
| 2024 | 28,874 | 16,989 | 181 |
| 2025 | 57,945 | 10,059 | 203 |
