= Buick Electra E4 =

Battery electric mid-size crossover SUV

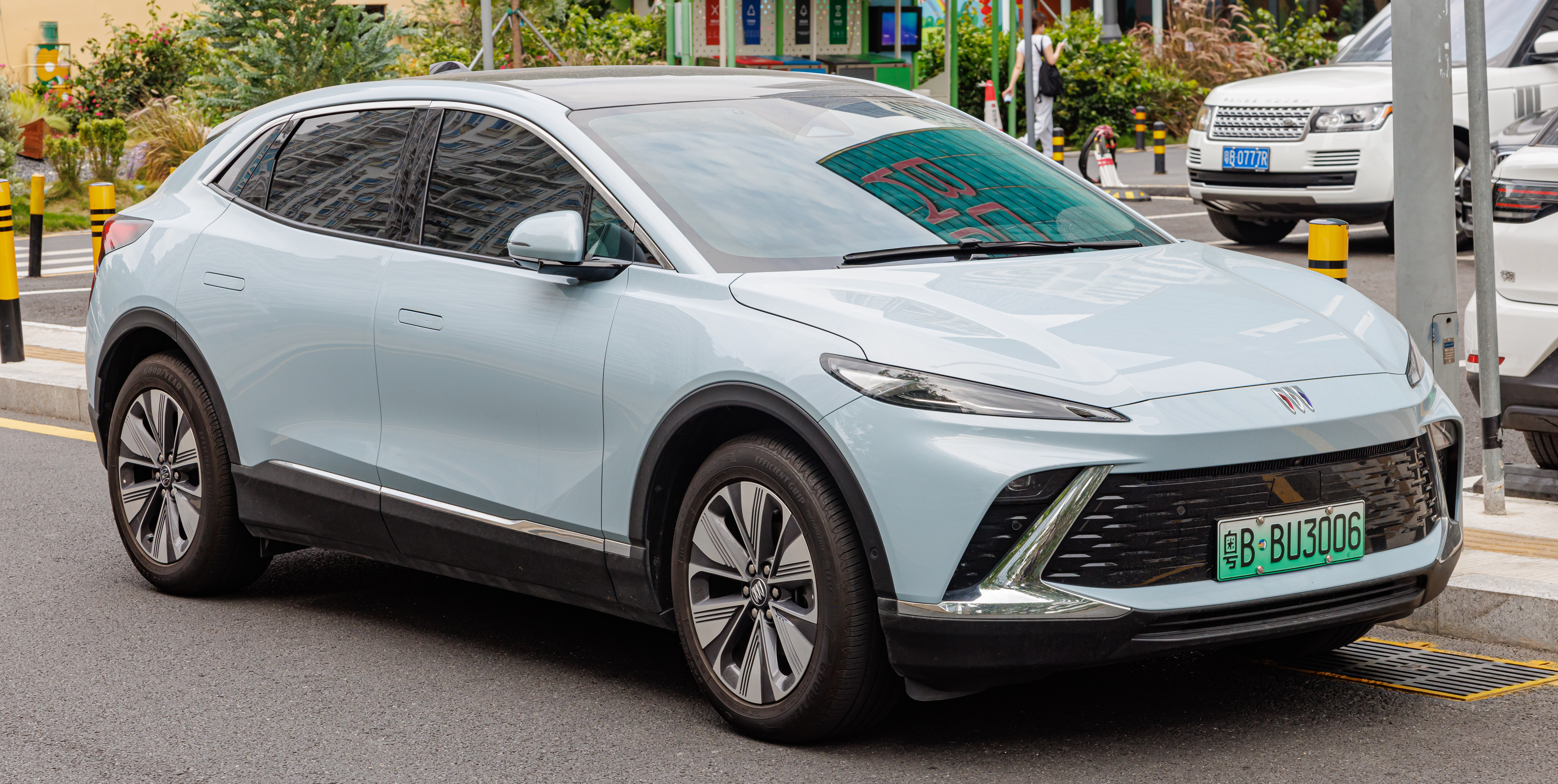

Overview
- Manufacturer: SAIC-GM
- Model code: B223
- Production: 2023–2025
- Assembly: China: Wuhan (SAIC-GM)

Body and chassis
- Class: Mid-size crossover SUV
- Body style: 5-door coupe SUV
- Layout: Front-motor, front-wheel-drive; Dual-motor, four-wheel-drive
- Platform: GM BEV3
- Related: Cadillac Optiq; Buick Electra E5; Chevrolet Equinox EV

Powertrain
- Electric motor: Permanent magnet motor
- Power output: 180–211 kW (245–287 PS; 241–283 hp)
- Battery: 65 kWh Ultium LFP; 79.7 kWh Ultium
- Electric range: 530–620 km (329–385 mi) (CLTC)
- Plug-in charging: 11.5 kW (AC); 195 kW (DC)

Dimensions
- Wheelbase: 2,954 mm (116.3 in)
- Length: 4,818 mm (189.7 in)
- Width: 1,912 mm (75.3 in)
- Height: 1,580 mm (62.2 in)

The Buick Electra E4 is a battery electric mid-size crossover SUV manufactured by SAIC-GM under the Buick brand.

== History ==
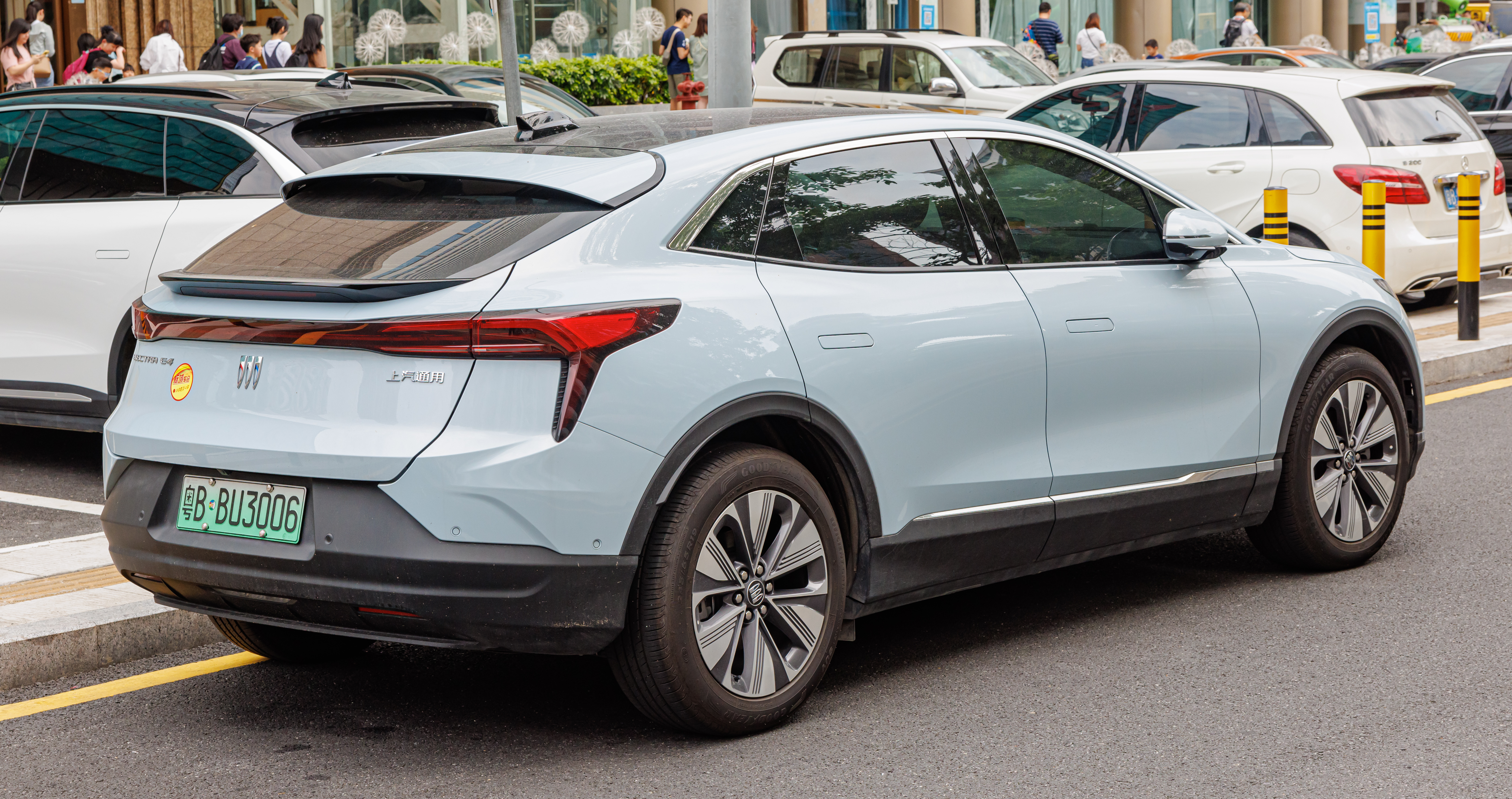
Rear view

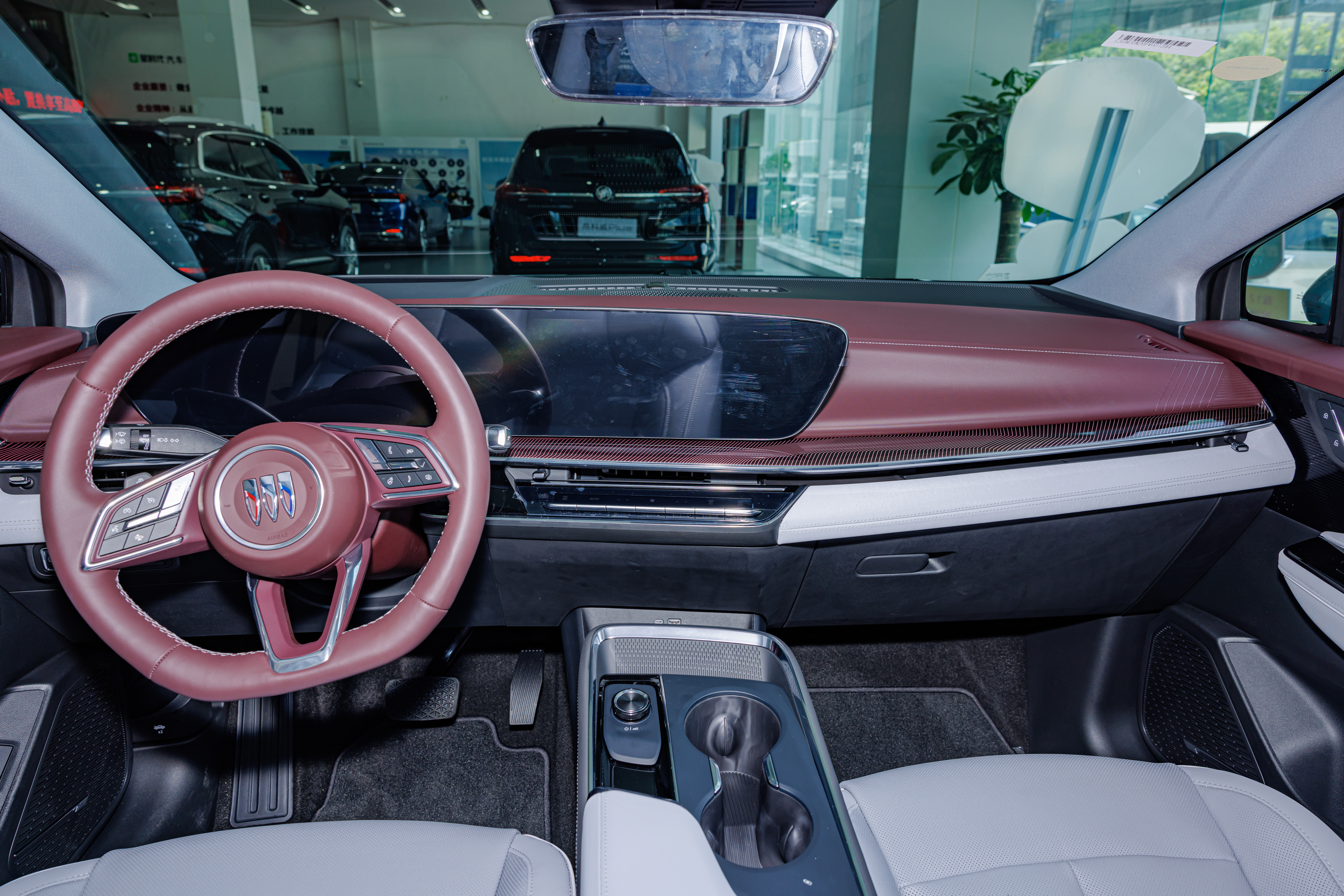
Interior

In June 2023, the Chinese branch of the Buick brand officially presented the second model in a new line of fully electric models signed with the Electra emblem used in the 20th century. The E4 placed itself below the flagship Electra E5 in the range, drawing extensively on it stylistically through the new "Pure Design" language. Slender and sharp lines marked, among others, oblong, narrow headlights, a large trapezoidal front air intake, as well as an upturned window line and retractable door handles. The gently sloping roof line gave the proportions typical of the so-called Coupe SUVs. Like other next-generation electric cars from General Motors, the Electra E4 is based on the BEV3 platform.

Following the example of other Buick models from the new stylistic line debuting at the same time, the Electra E4 gained a simple and minimalist design of a spacious passenger cabin covered with a 1.2 square meter roof window. The cockpit is formed by a one-piece curved array of integrated digital gauges with a central 30-inch 6K touchscreen. The car is equipped with an extensive package of 28 compartments located in the passenger compartment, as well as an extensive ambient lighting system in 121 colors.

The Electra E4 was developed exclusively for the Mainland Chinese market, for which it was developed, engineered and manufactured locally at GM's Shanghai facilities. Sales began right after the official premiere in the second half of June 2023. The cheapest variant was priced at the time of debut at 189,900 yuan, and the top of the line model is at 259,600 yuan.

Electra E4 was removed from the Buick China website in March 2025.

== Specifications ==
As a fully electric car, the Electra E4 is powered by a 241 hp (180 kW) motor, producing 330 N⋅m (243 lb⋅ft) of maximum torque and reaching 100 km/h (62 mph) in 7.6 seconds. Electricity is stored in a lithium iron phosphate battery with a capacity of 65 kWh and offers approximately 530 km (330 mi) of maximum range in CLTC testing. The second, top-of-the-line Electra E4 GS variant is powered by two motors transmitting power to each axle and developing 283 hp (211 kW). The car accelerates to 100 km/h (62 mph) in 6.2 seconds, while thanks to a larger battery with a capacity of 80 kWh, offers about 620 km (385 mi) of range in CLTC testing.

== Sales ==
Year	China
2023	1,977
2024	1,617
2025	778
