= Chevrolet Blazer EV =

Battery electric mid-size crossover SUV

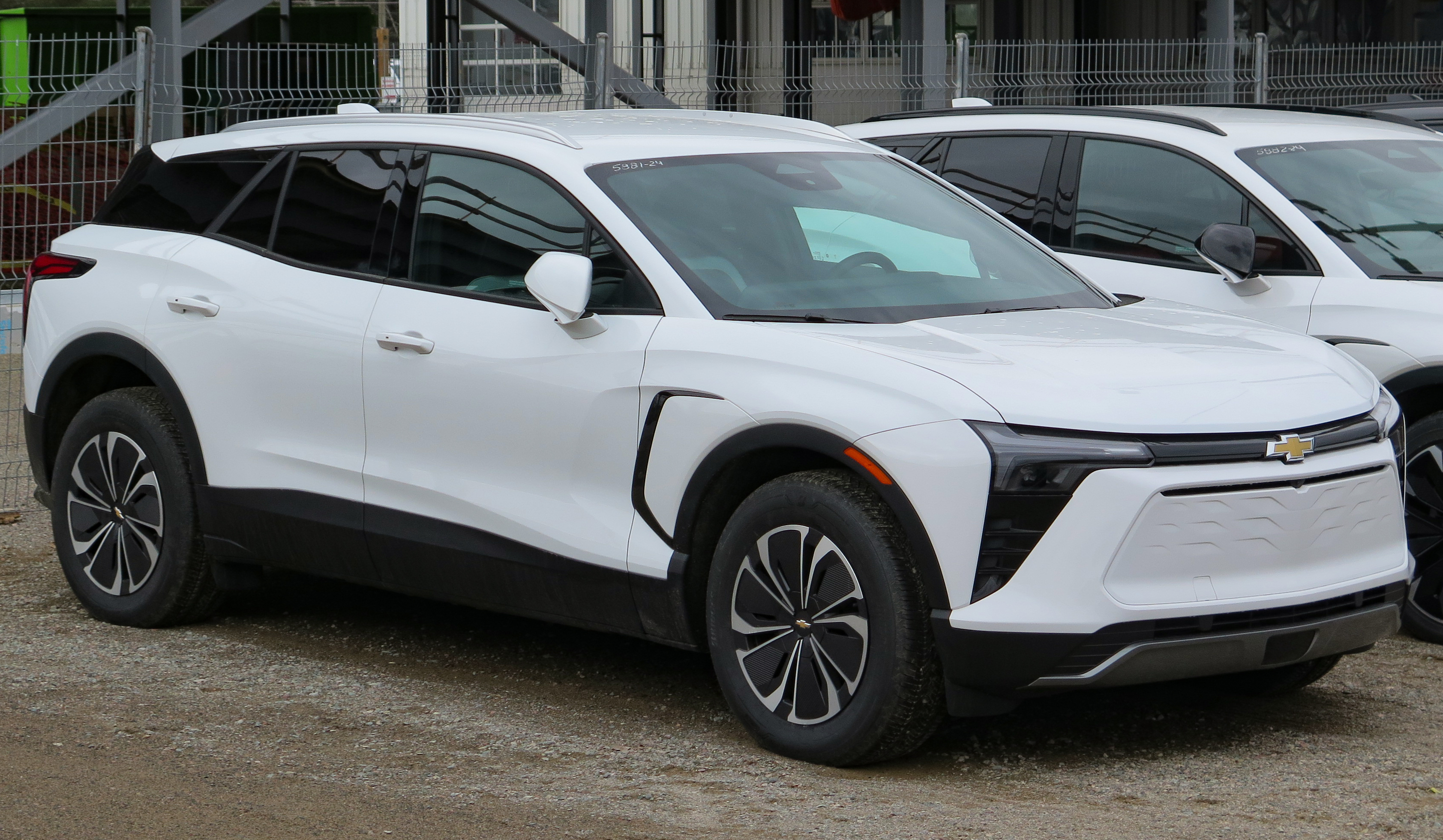
- 2024 Chevrolet Blazer EV 2LT (Canada)

Overview
- Manufacturer: General Motors
- Production: November 2023 – present
- Model years: 2024–present
- Assembly: Mexico: Ramos Arizpe, Coahuila (Ramos Arizpe Assembly)
- Designer: Eduardo Okamoto, Raphael Molina (exterior); Sang-hyun Park, Justin Salmon (interior)

Body and chassis
- Class: Mid-size crossover SUV
- Body style: 5-door SUV
- Layout: Front-motor, front-wheel-drive; Rear-motor, rear-wheel-drive (2023 – 2025); Dual-motor, all-wheel-drive
- Platform: GM BEV3
- Related: Cadillac Lyriq; Honda Prologue; Chevrolet Equinox EV

Powertrain
- Electric motor: Permanent magnet motor
- Power output: 220 hp (223 PS; 164 kW)/243 lb⋅ft (329 N⋅m) (2LT/RS FWD); 300 hp (304 PS; 224 kW)/355 lb⋅ft (481 N⋅m) (2LT/RS AWD); 365 hp (370 PS; 272 kW)/325 lb⋅ft (441 N⋅m) (RS RWD); 615 hp (624 PS; 459 kW)/650 lb⋅ft (881 N⋅m) (SS)
- Battery: Ultium lithium-ion: 85 kWh; 102 kWh
- Electric range: EPA: 85 kWh AWD: 279 mi (449 km); 102 kWh RWD: 324 mi (521 km); 102 kWh AWD: 294 mi (473 km)
- Plug-in charging: 11.5 kW (AC); 195 kW (DC)

Dimensions
- Wheelbase: 121.8 in (3,094 mm)
- Length: 192.2 in (4,882 mm)
- Width: 78.0 in (1,981 mm)
- Height: 65.0 in (1,651 mm)
- Curb weight: 5,163 lb (2,342 kg) (AWD)

The Chevrolet Blazer EV is a battery electric mid-size crossover SUV manufactured by General Motors under the Chevrolet brand. Introduced in 2022, the model went on sale in mid-2023 in North America. The model offers up 320 miles (510 km) of range. It is produced at GM's plant in Ramos Arizpe, Mexico. The Blazer EV also won the MotorTrend SUV of the Year Award (SUVOTY) for 2024.

== Overview ==
General Motors initially announced that the Blazer EV would be available in 1LT, 2LT, RS, and SS trim levels. The base 1LT trim was cancelled when the RS trim was released in August 2023. The Blazer SS becomes the first electric Chevrolet to bear the SS badge, and the variant is rated at 615 hp (624 PS; 459 kW) and 650 lb⋅ft (881 N⋅m; 89.9 kg⋅m) of torque.

The Blazer EV takes inspiration from Chevrolet's sports cars for the exterior design. It features full LED exterior lighting with choreographed lighting sequence feature on the RS and SS models, motorsport-inspired extractor vents on front fenders and T-shaped LED taillights.

The interior carries on the sports car inspired theme from the exterior, particularly on the RS and SS models. There is an 11-inch Driver Information Center and a 17.7-inch infotainment touchscreen display (it is the first vehicle to use General Motors Ultifi system). A traditional vehicle starter button is omitted, instead the driver pushes the brake pedal and the car is automatically placed into drive gear. Instead of Apple CarPlay and Android Auto, Chevrolet chose Google built-in software, citing reasons including driver safety and the intent to eliminate driving distractions.

Other features include Chevy Safety Assist safety suite, the option of Super Cruise hands-free advanced driving assistant feature and regenerative braking includes one-pedal driving mode.

The Blazer EV has a fast-charging capability that allows for approximately 78 mi (126 km) of charge in 10 minutes. A "Wide Open Watts" (WOW) mode allows the Blazer SS to reach 60 mph (97 km/h) in less than four seconds.

A 9C1 police pursuit vehicle (PPV) model is based on the SS trim. It has exterior, interior, technology and powertrain modifications for police use. It is powered by a dual-motor, all-wheel-drive setup with a maximum power output of 498 hp (505 PS; 371 kW) and 571 lb⋅ft (774 N⋅m; 78.9 kg⋅m) of torque, and can support both Level 2 and 3 chargers.

In February 2025, an SS trim version served as the pace-car for the 2025 Daytona 500, the first electric vehicle to do so.

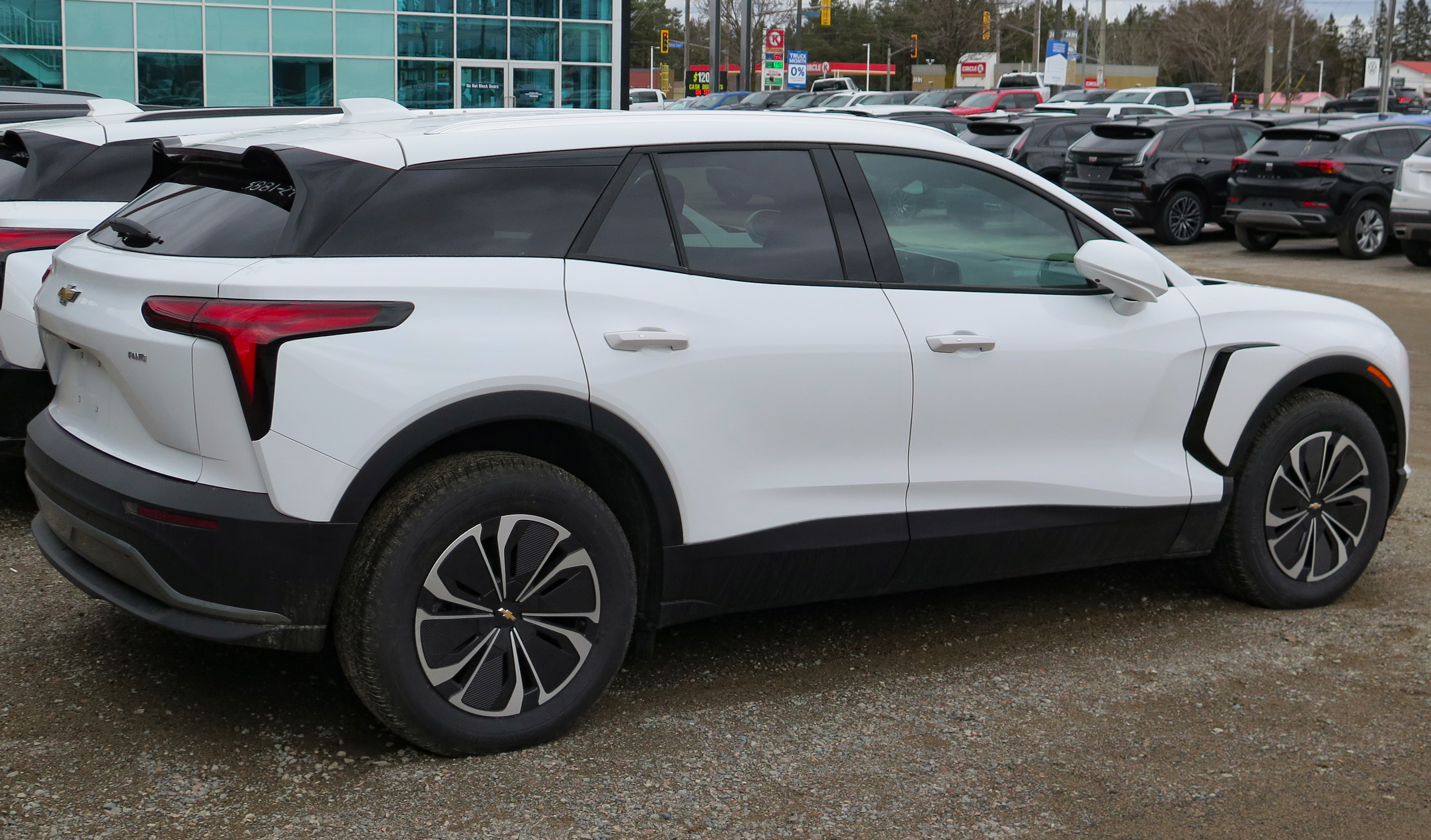
Rear view

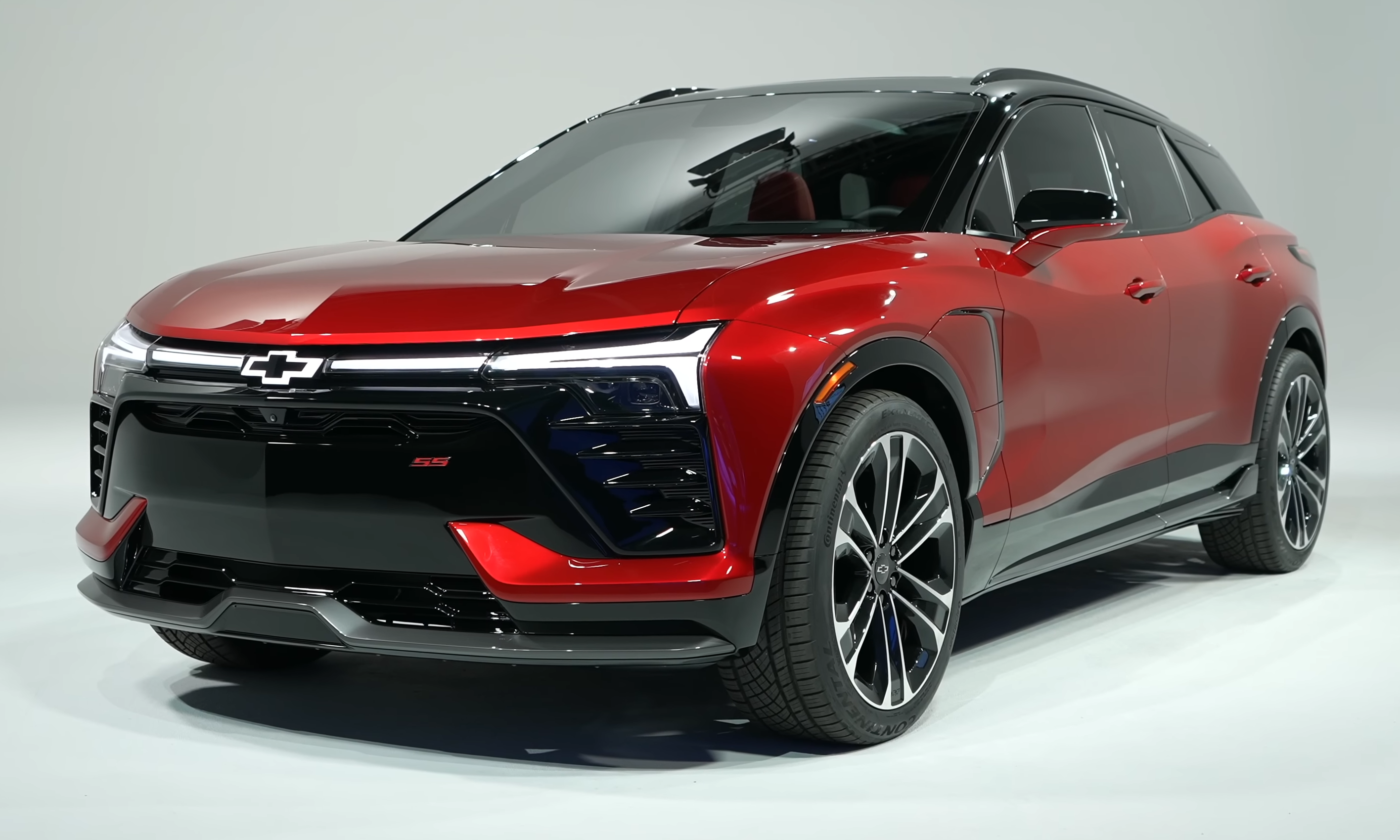
Blazer EV SS

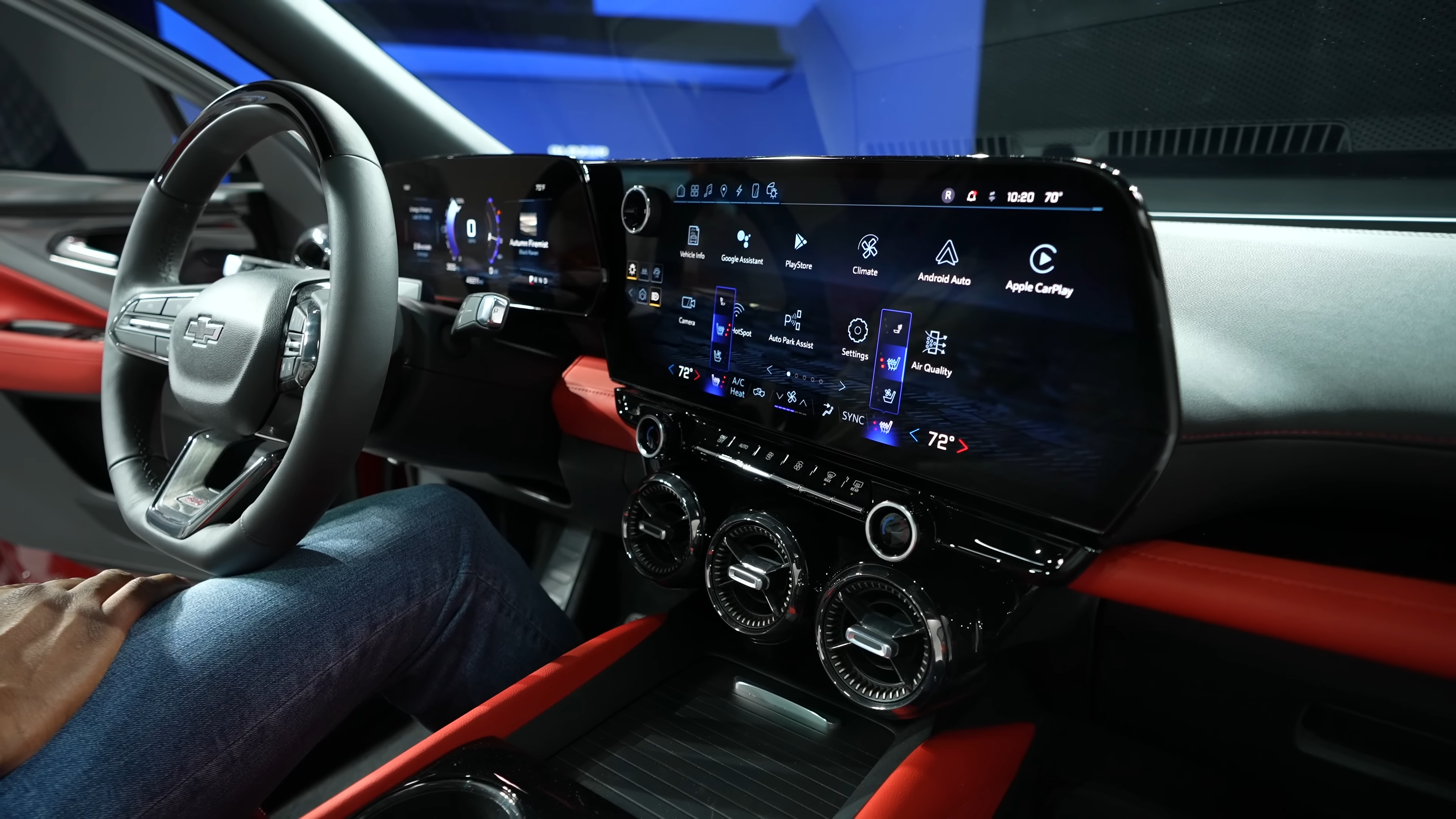
Interior

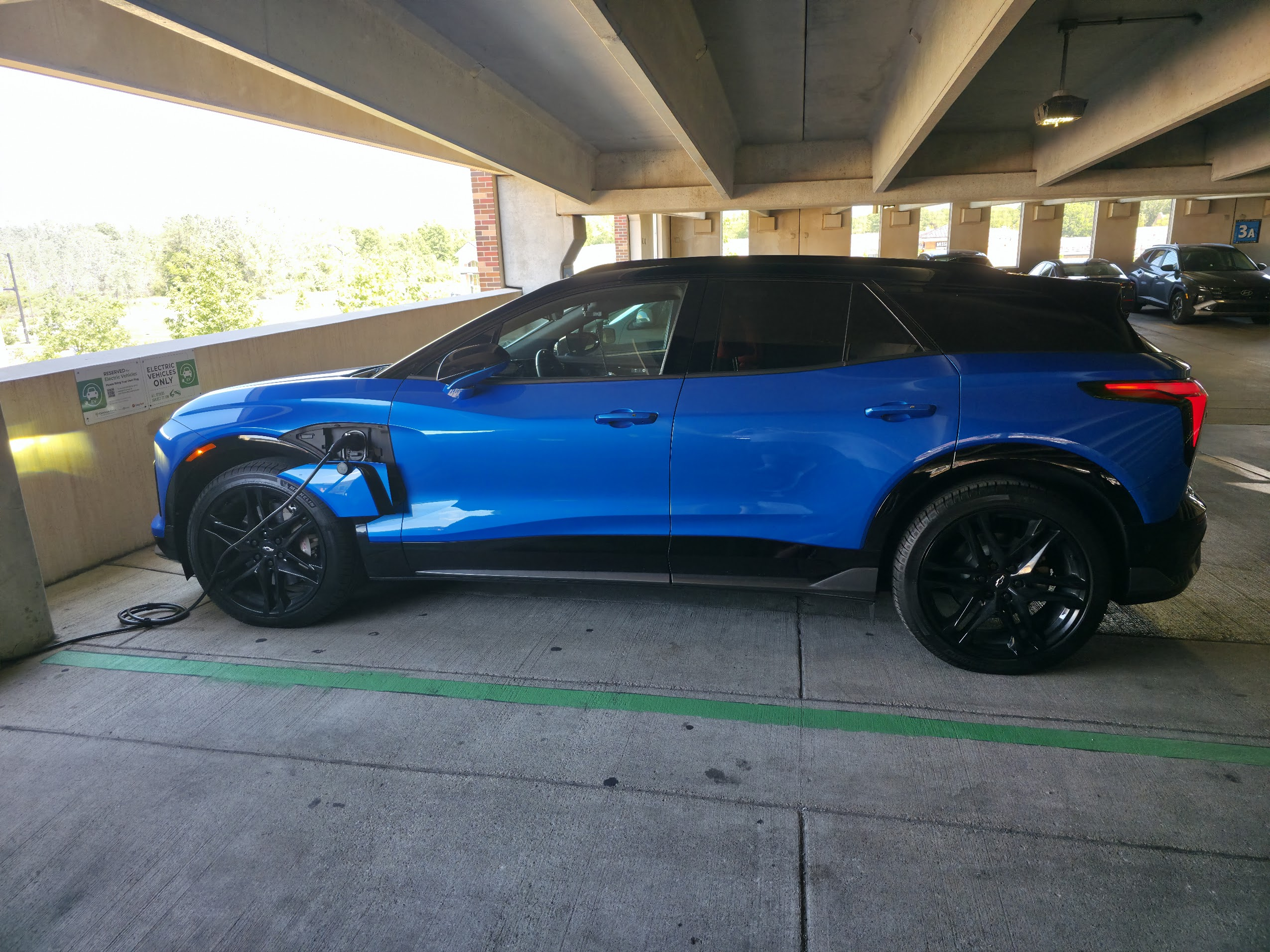
Blazer EV SS shown with its side charging port opened and in-use

== Production halt ==
In December 2023, Chevrolet paused the Blazer EV's production due to many software issues, charging problems, and battery trouble. Production and sales resumed in March 2024.

== Chevrolet Blazer EV.R ==
Chevrolet Blazer EV.R
- Category: NASCAR
- Predecessor: Chevrolet Camaro Cup Car

Technical specifications
- Length: 195 inches (4,953.0 mm)
- Width: 95 inches (2,413.0 mm)
- Height: 50 inches (1,270.0 mm)
- Wheelbase: 121.8 inches (3,093.7 mm)
- Electric motor: 1x Front, 2x Rear
- Transmission: Direct Drive
- Power: 1,318 horsepower (1,336.3 PS; 982.8 kW); 1,450 pound-feet (1,965.9 N⋅m)
- Weight: 3,370 pounds (1,529 kg)
- Tires: Goodyear Eagle

Competition history

Chevrolet has announced an electric NASCAR concept called the Chevrolet Blazer EV.R. The car is planned to weigh around 3,370 lb (1,529 kg).

== Sales ==
Calendar year	U.S.	Canada
2023	482	36
2024	23,115	5,810
2025	22,637	2,139
