= General Motors BEV3 platform =

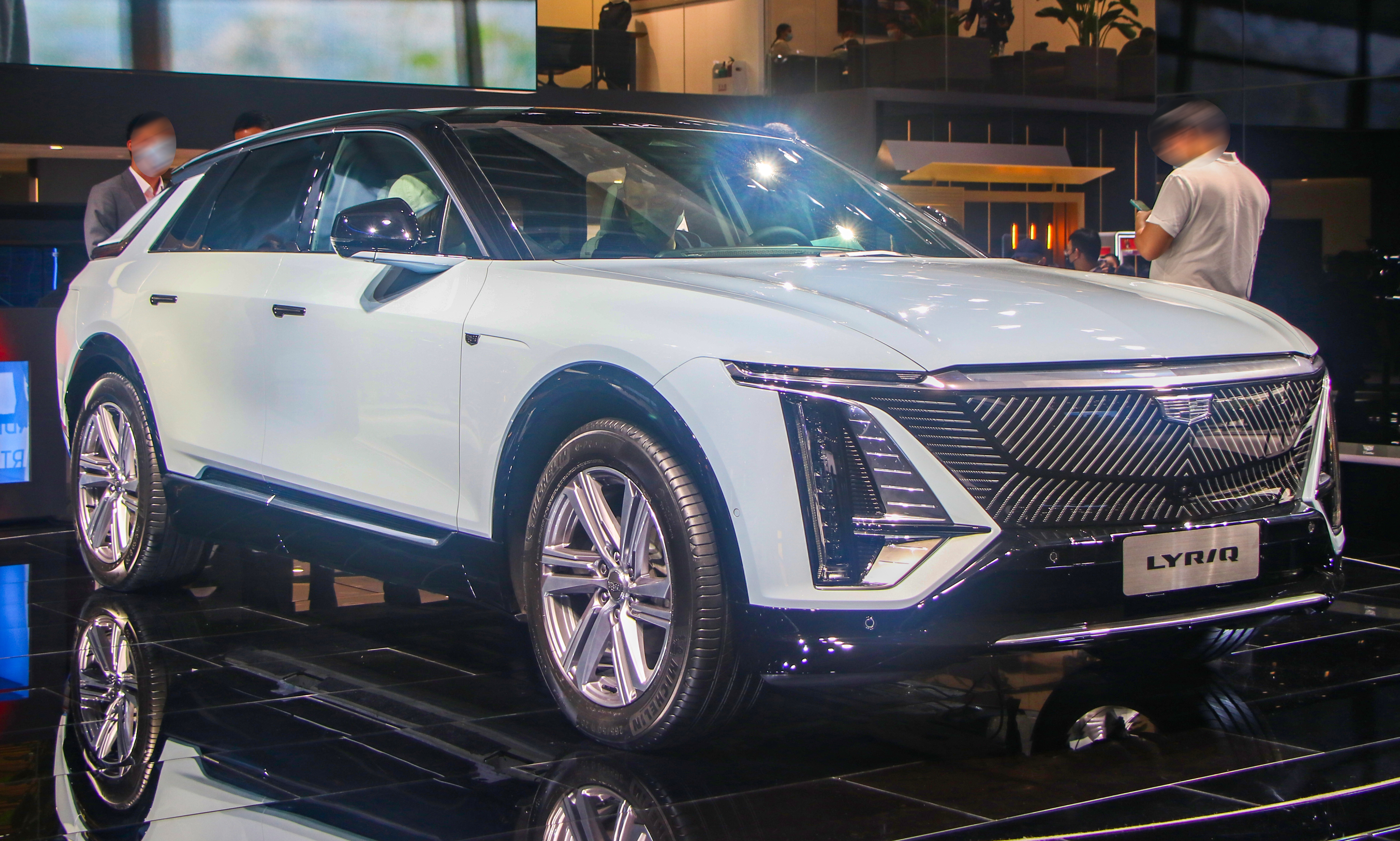
- Cadillac Lyriq, the first vehicle based on the BEV3 platform

Overview
- Manufacturer: General Motors
- Production: 2022–present

Body and chassis
- Layout: Front-motor, front-wheel-drive; Rear-motor, rear-wheel-drive; Dual-motor, all-wheel-drive
- Related: GM BT1

Chronology
- Predecessor: GM BEV2

The General Motors BEV3 platform is a dedicated electric vehicle architecture or platform developed by General Motors. It is the third-generation electric vehicle platform by GM, succeeding the BEV2 platform. It is categorized as a skateboard platform.

== History ==
Honda announced it would partner with General Motors to develop "next-generation" batteries in 2018. The BEV3 architecture was first announced by GM in January 2019, with Cadillac announced as the lead marque, and BEV3 was officially detailed on March 4, 2020, during the GM EV Day briefing in Warren, Michigan, and supports Ultium batteries and Ultium Drive motors.

In 2021, Honda announced it would release two SUVs in 2024 under the Honda and Acura marques, developed in partnership with GM; it was clarified in 2022 the new Honda SUVs would be built alongside GM SUVs, using Ultium batteries and GM's electric vehicle platform.

== Design ==
The BEV3 platform is designed to support unibody passenger cars and crossover utility vehicles, while body-on-frame trucks and SUVs will be based on the General Motors BT1 platform. BEV3 supports front-, rear-, and all-wheel drive configurations using one or more Ultium Drive units, each of which combines the electric traction motor, reduction gear, and power electronics.

GM claim that BEV3 will offer a larger footprint with lower height, greater energy density, and faster charging rate compared to BEV2. The modular design will allow from six to twenty-four battery modules under the floor, depending on energy storage requirements. Premium vehicles that use the BEV3 platform have the option of a 4–6 in (100–150 mm) larger dash-to-axle ratio, (Note: Dash-to-axle is defined as the distance between the cowl and the centerline of the front axle. The dash-to-axle ratio concept first received broad attention when Edsel Ford was directing the design of the Lincoln Continental in the late 1930s. Typically, a longer dash-to-axle ratio results in a long hood, with consonant implications of a more powerful engine and rear-wheel-drive layout.) resulting in a longer hood that is intended to recall the classic proportions of personal luxury cars designed by Bill Mitchell for GM.

== Applications ==
=== Current models ===
- Buick Electra E5 (2023–present)
- Cadillac Celestiq (2024–present)
- Cadillac Lyriq (2022–present)
- Cadillac Optiq (2024–present)
- Cadillac Vistiq (2025–present)
- Chevrolet Blazer EV (2023–present)
- Chevrolet Equinox EV (2024–present)
- Honda Prologue (2024–present)

=== Former models ===
- Acura ZDX (2024–2025)
- Buick Electra E4 (2023–2025)

=== Gallery ===
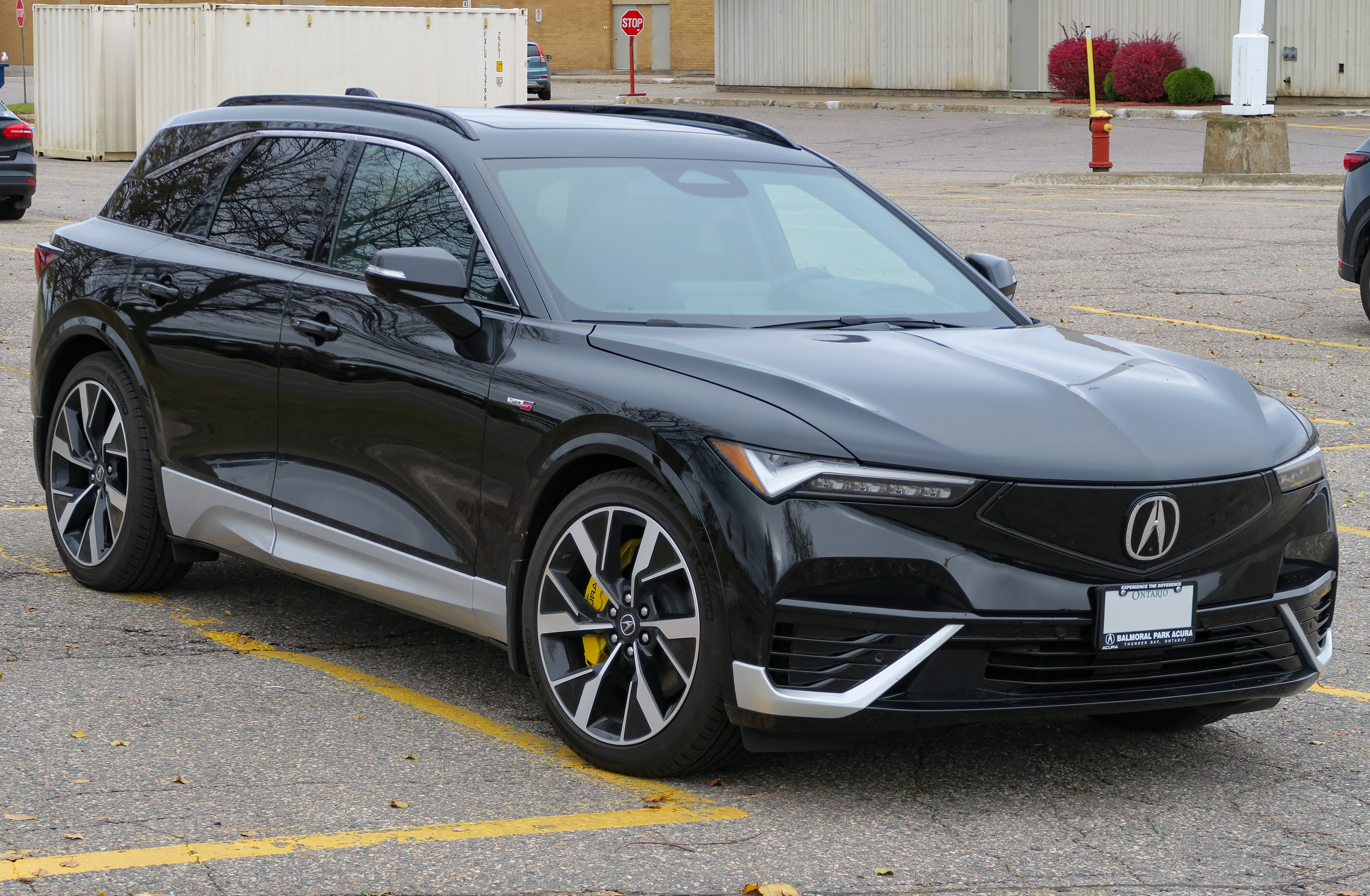
Acura ZDX

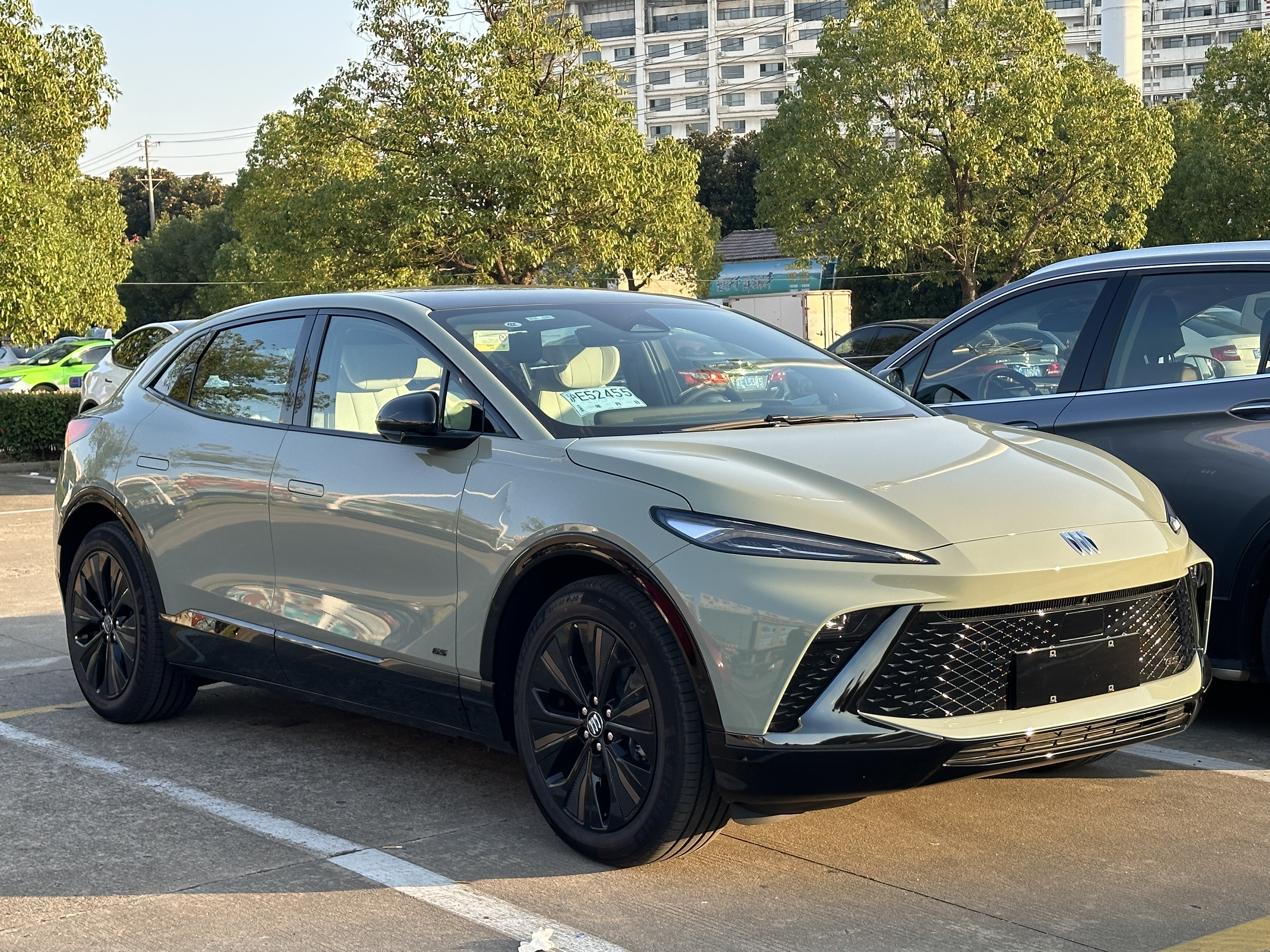
Buick Electra E4

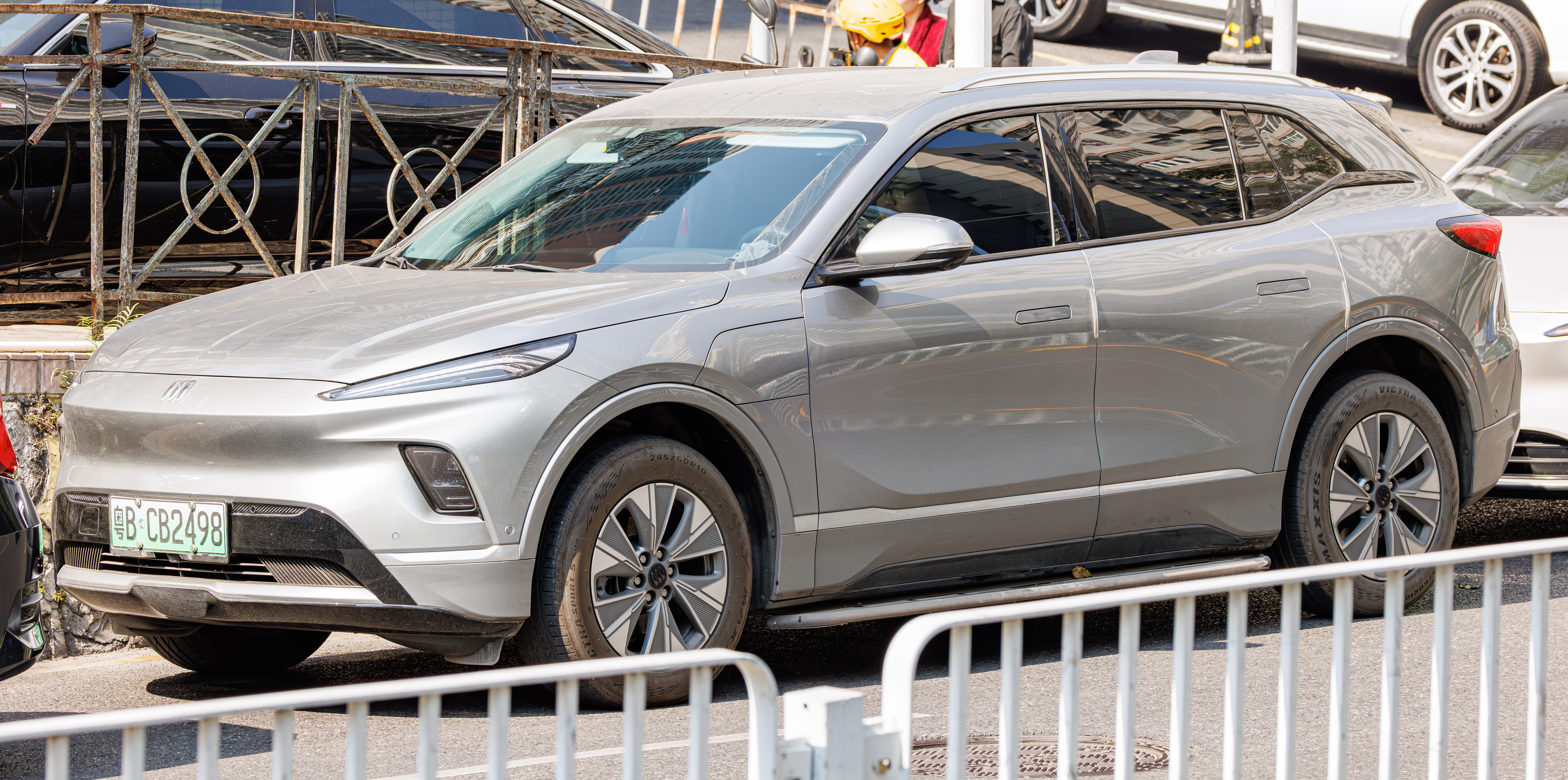
Buick Electra E5

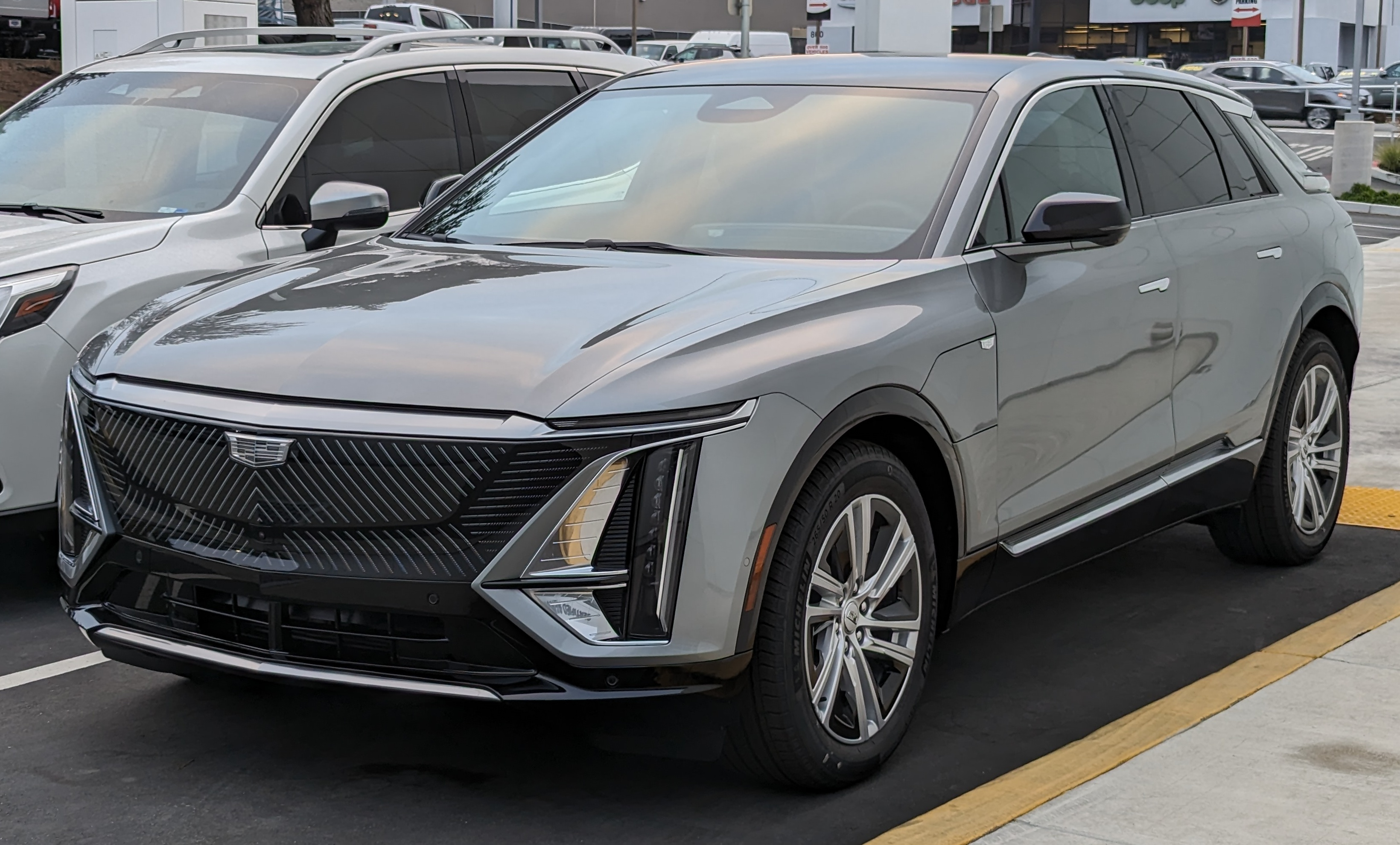
Cadillac Lyriq

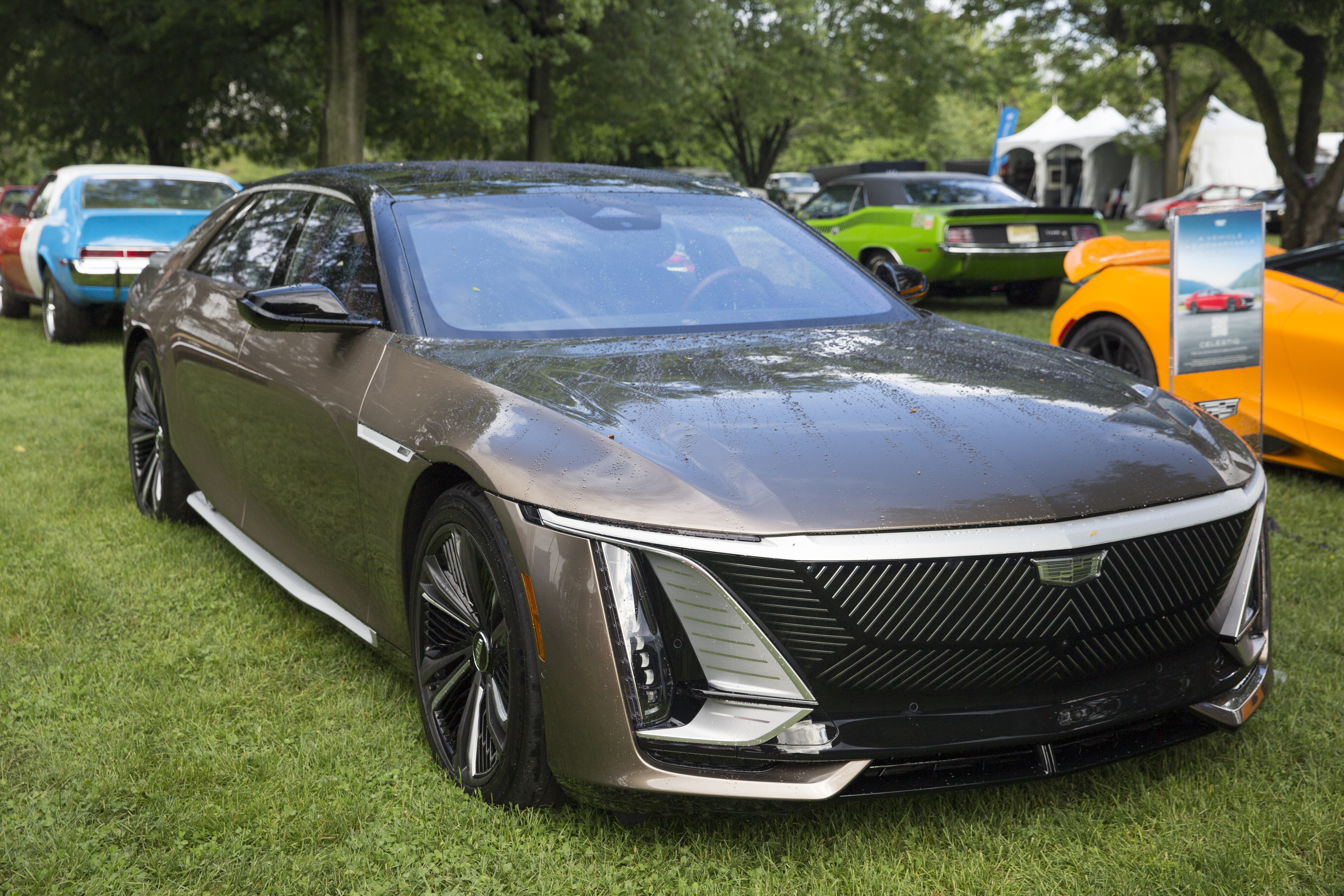
Cadillac Celestiq

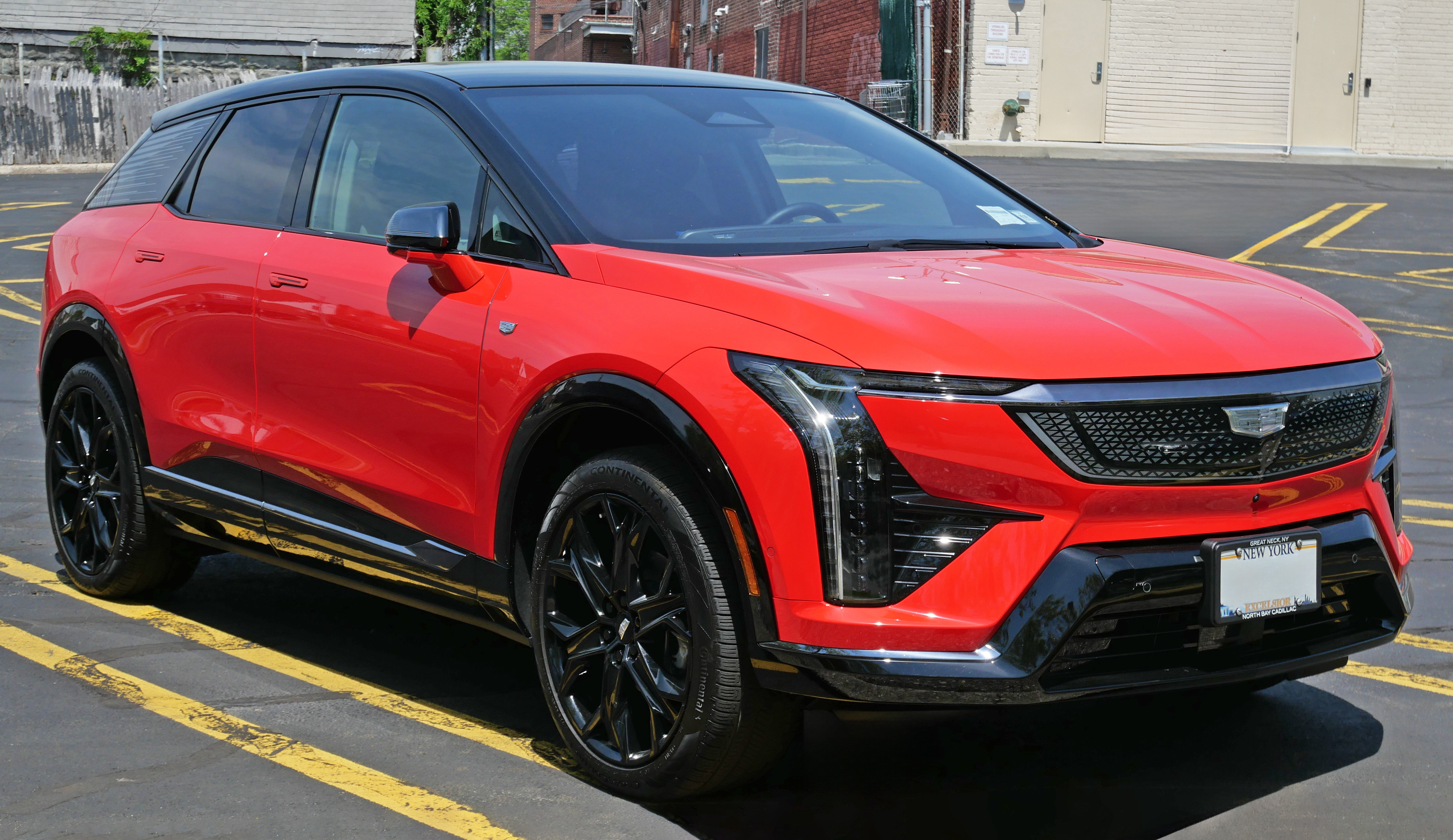
Cadillac Optiq

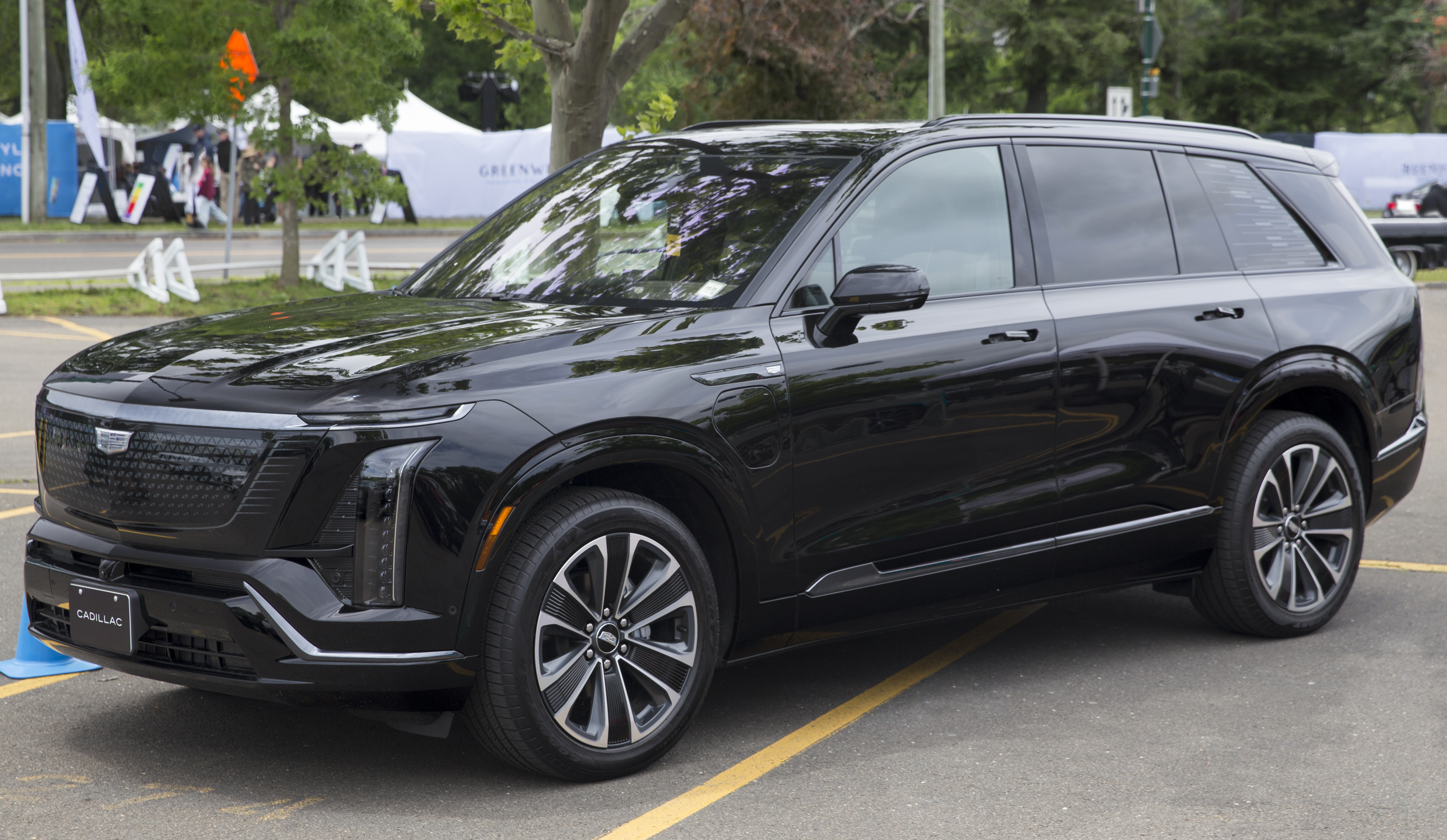
Cadillac Vistiq

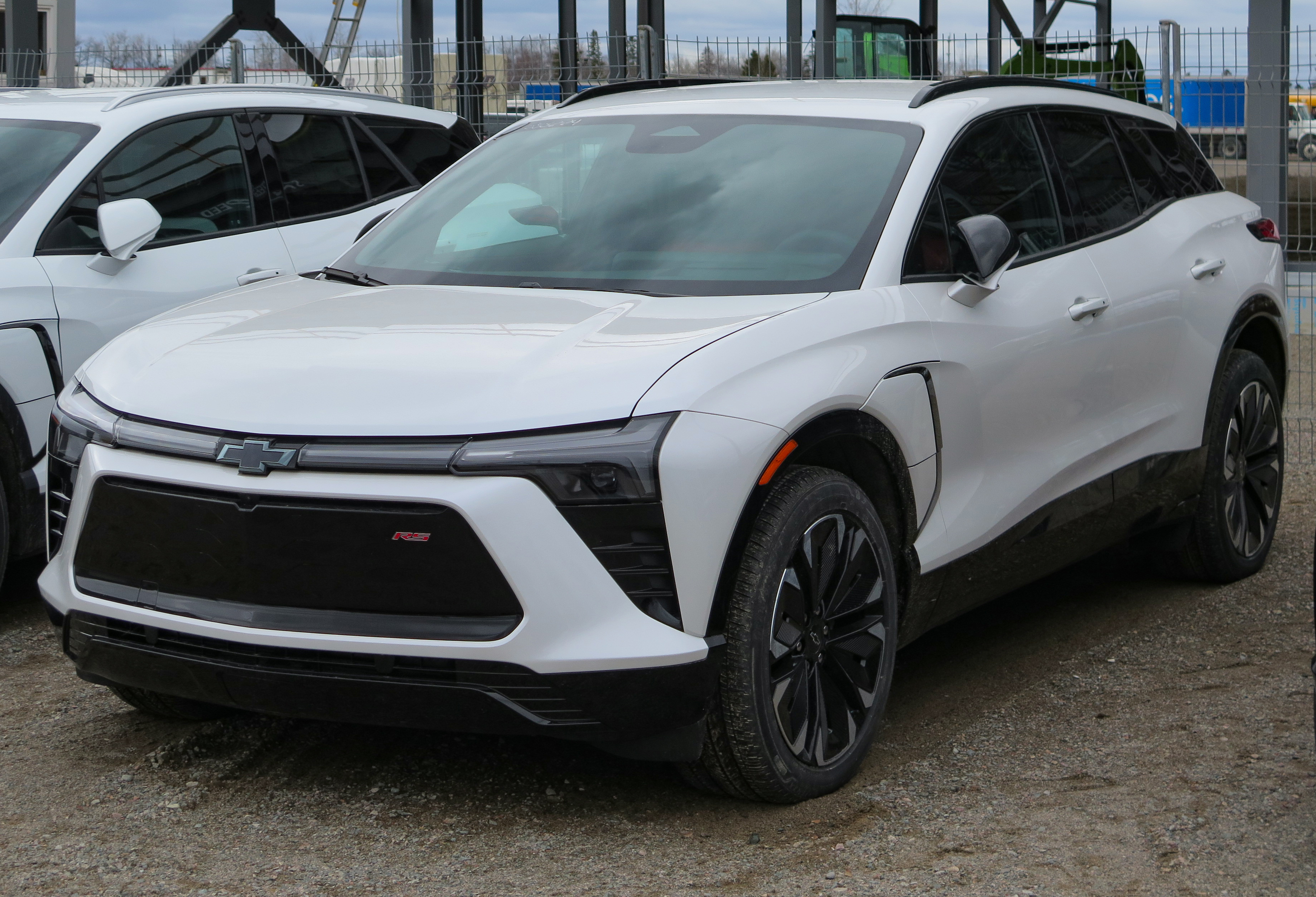
Chevrolet Blazer EV

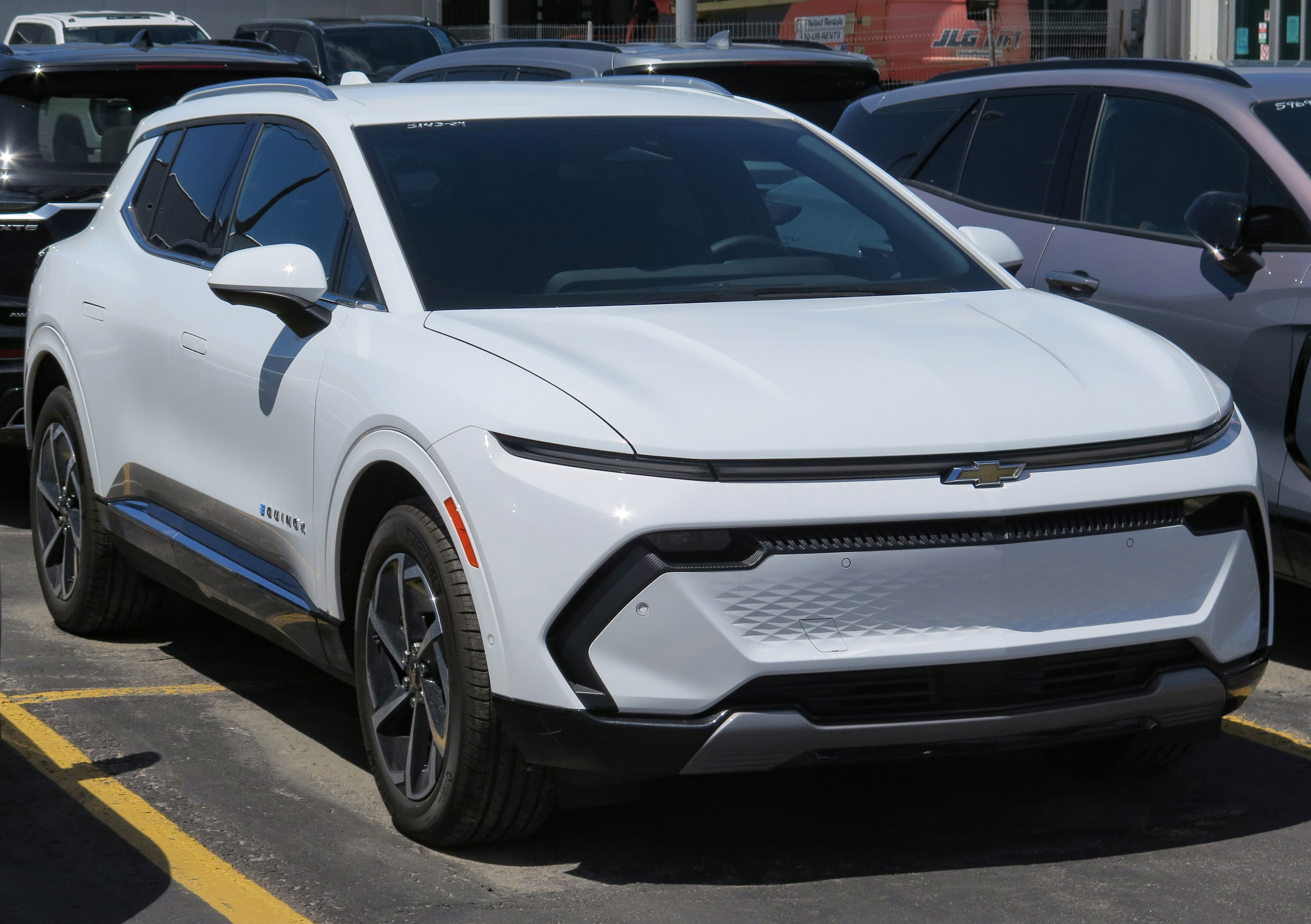
Chevrolet Equinox EV

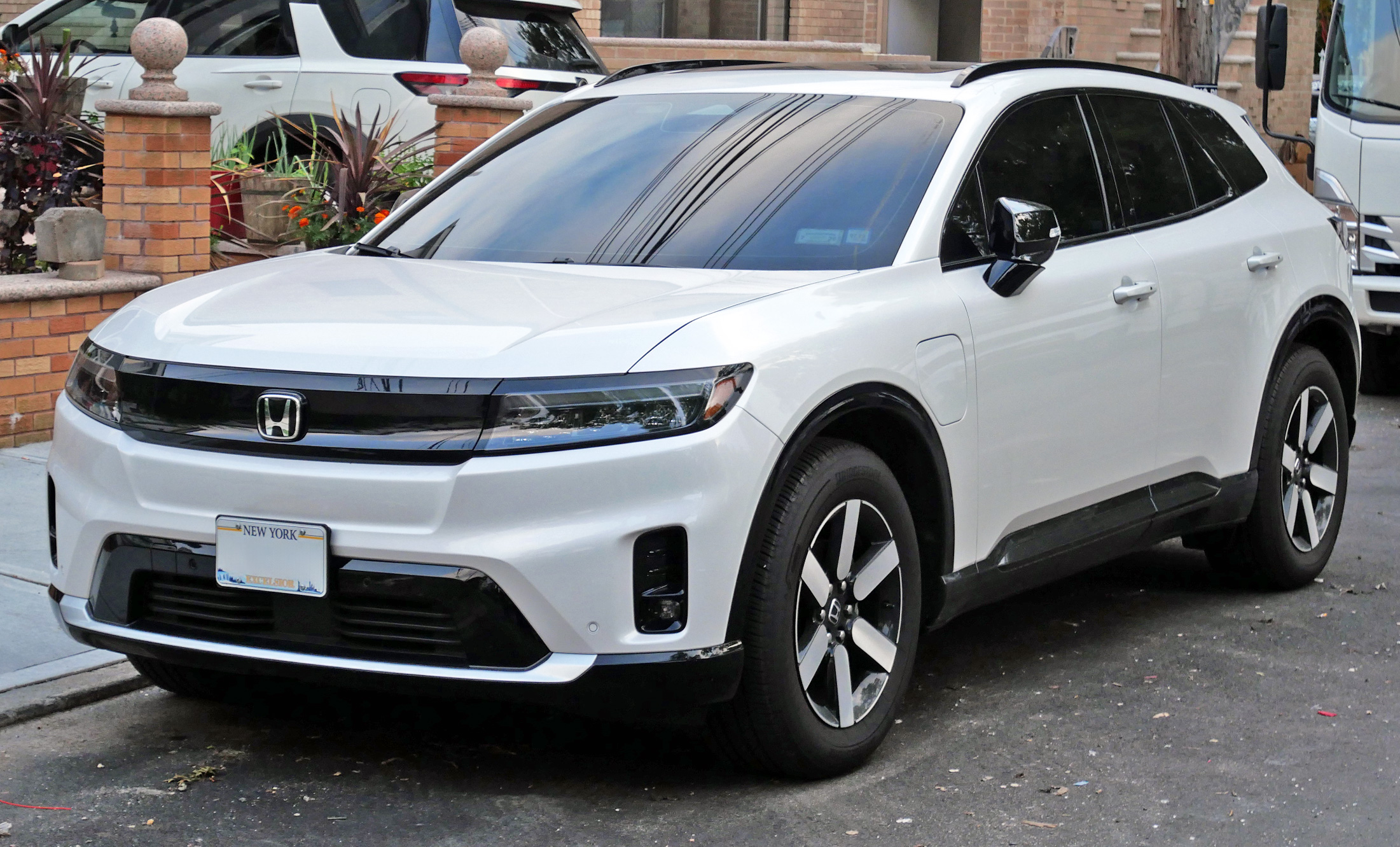
Honda Prologue

== See also ==
- General Motors BEV2 platform
- Ultium, the battery and motor used for the platform
