= Ramos Arizpe Assembly =

Automobile factory in Mexico

- Operated: 1981–present
- Location: Ramos Arizpe, Mexico
- Coordinates: 25.51060418°N 100.9685694°W
- Industry: Automotive
- Products: Automobiles
- Owner: General Motors de México

The Ramos Arizpe Assembly is a General Motors automobile factory in Ramos Arizpe, Coahuila, Mexico. It opened in 1981 and has manufactured Buick, Cadillac, Chevrolet, GMC, Honda, Oldsmobile, Pontiac, Saturn, and Saab vehicles. It currently produces the Chevrolet Blazer and, along with San Luis Potosi Assembly, the Chevrolet Equinox.

Opened in 1981, Ramos Arizpe is one of a total of four assembly plants of General Motors de México, and has produced 21 different models since it was inaugurated.

== History ==
GM Ramos Arizpe started operations in 1981 with an assembly plant dedicated to producing 4 Chevrolet models: Malibu, Monte Carlo, Citation, and Celebrity. A year later, the Engine Plant began operations with the production of 6 and 8 cylinder engines.

In 1983, Ramos Arizpe became the first Mexican GM plant to export cars to the United States with the Chevrolet El Camino model. Towards 1988, it began exports to Japan, being the first time that GM shipped vehicles from America to the Asian continent.

In 1995, the Stamping plant began operations, where the panels to form the bodywork are produced, in 1997 the Painting Plant began, which will be replaced by the one recently announced. In 2008, a 6-speed Automatic Transmission Plant was opened and the operations of the 6-cylinder Engine Plant were expanded.

In 2022, GM Mexico announced that the Ramos Arizpe factory would create 1,500 jobs to produce electric vehicles.

== Vehicles produced ==
=== Current ===
As of July, 2026:

- Chevrolet Blazer (crossover) (2019–present)
- Honda Prologue (2024–present)
- Cadillac Optiq (2025–present)
- Chevrolet Blazer EV (2023–present)
- Chevrolet Equinox EV (2024–present)

=== Former ===
- Chevrolet Equinox (2018–2024)
- Chevrolet Cruze (2016–2018)
- Chevrolet Sonic (2012–2017)
- Saab 9-4X (2011)
- Cadillac SRX (2010–2016)
- Chevrolet Captiva Sport (2008–2015)
- Saturn Vue (2008–2010)
- Chevrolet HHR (2006–2011)
- Buick Rendezvous (2002–2007)
- Pontiac Aztek (2001–2005)
- Pontiac Sunfire (1995–2005)
- Chevrolet Chevy (1994–2011)
- Chevrolet Cavalier (1982–2005)
- Buick Century (1982–1996)
- Oldsmobile Cutlass Ciera (1982–1996)
- Pontiac Sunbird (1982–1994)
- Chevrolet Celebrity (1982–1990)
- Chevrolet El Camino (1985–1987)
- GMC Caballero (1985–1987)
- Chevrolet Citation (1982–1985)
- Chevrolet Malibu (1982–1983)
- Chevrolet Monte Carlo (1981–1988)
