= Cadillac Optiq =

Battery electric compact luxury crossover SUV

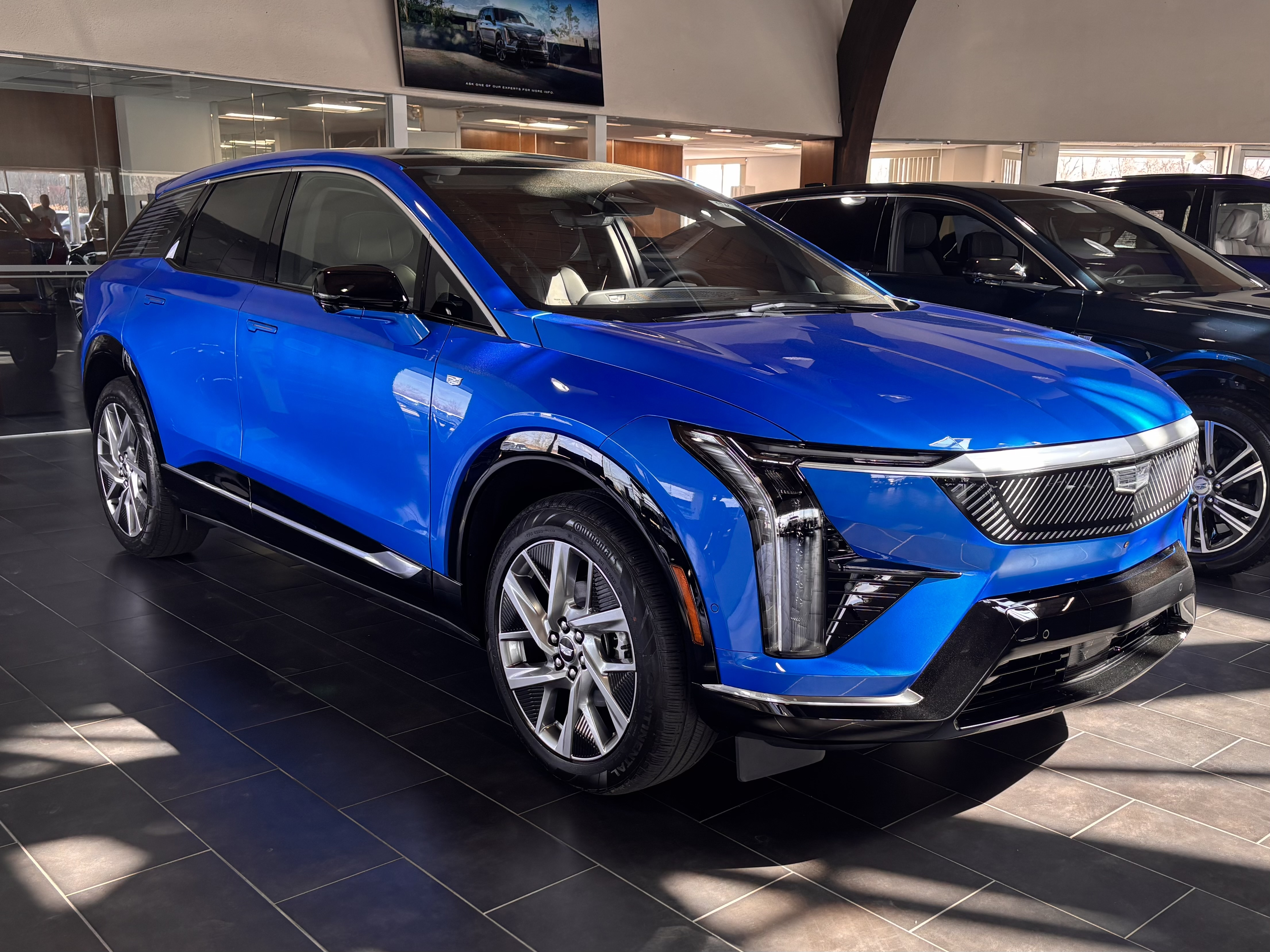

Overview
- Manufacturer: General Motors
- Production: 2024–present; 2023–2026 (China)
- Assembly: China: Wuhan (SAIC-GM); Mexico: Ramos Arizpe (Ramos Arizpe Assembly)
- Designer: Jason Chen; Namsuk Lee; Dillon Blanski; Hoon Kim; Mark Ferri (Sculpting); Nelson Chan (Sculpting)

Body and chassis
- Class: Compact luxury crossover SUV
- Body style: 5-door SUV
- Layout: Front-motor, front-wheel-drive (2023 - 2026); Rear-motor, rear-wheel-drive (After 2026); Dual-motors, four-wheel-drive (Optiq dual motor)
- Platform: GM BEV3
- Related: Buick Electra E4; Chevrolet Blazer EV; Acura ZDX (second generation)

Powertrain
- Electric motor: Permanent magnet synchronous
- Battery: 68.4 kWh; 79.7 kWh; 85 kWh Ultium NMC
- Electric range: 536–600 km (333–373 mi) (CLTC) 302 mi (486 km) (EPA)
- Plug-in charging: 19.2 kW (AC); 150 kW (DC)

Dimensions
- Wheelbase: 2,954 mm (116.3 in)
- Length: 4,822 mm (189.8 in)
- Width: 1,912 mm (75.3 in)
- Height: 1,642 mm (64.6 in)
- Curb weight: 2,220–2,350 kg (4,890–5,180 lb)

The Cadillac Optiq is a battery electric compact luxury crossover SUV marketed under the Cadillac brand of General Motors and manufactured in China by SAIC-GM, a joint venture between General Motors and SAIC Motor. It has been marketed in China since late 2023, in North America since early 2025 and in Europe starting late 2025.

== Overview ==
The Cadillac Optiq went on sale during the second half of 2023 in China. The North American Optiq was revealed on May 29, 2024 in Paris, and it will also be sold in the European market.

In China, it is available in three trims: two with front-wheel drive and a 68.4 kWh battery pack that have an output of 150 kW (201 hp; 204 PS) and 180 kW (241 hp; 245 PS) respectively, and an all-wheel drive option with 211 kW (283 hp; 287 PS) and a larger 79.7 kWh battery. The car is intended to be a lower priced entry-level EV for the brand.

In North America, the only powertrain option is an Ultium 85.0 kWh (usable capacity) NMC battery consisting of 10 modules using a 400 V electrical architecture. Total power output is 300 hp (224 kW; 304 PS) and 354 lb⋅ft (480 N⋅m) of torque from a dual motor all-wheel drive system consisting of a permanent magnet synchronous AC motor driving the front wheels and an induction motor driving the rear. Range estimates on the EPA test cycle is 302 miles (486 km).

The battery can charge at a maximum of 150 kW on a DC fast charger, which allows it to charge a claimed 79 miles (127 km) in 10 minutes. It also has a standard 11.5 kW onboard AC charger, with an optional 19.2 kW unit available. It is equipped with a CCS Type 1 charging port that is compatible with North American Tesla Supercharger charging stations with a NACS adapter.

The Optiq has a curb weight of 5,192 lb (2,355 kg) and is rated to tow up to 1,500 lb (680 kg). In the US, the Optiq will come with 20-inch wheels and optional 21-inch wheels will be available.

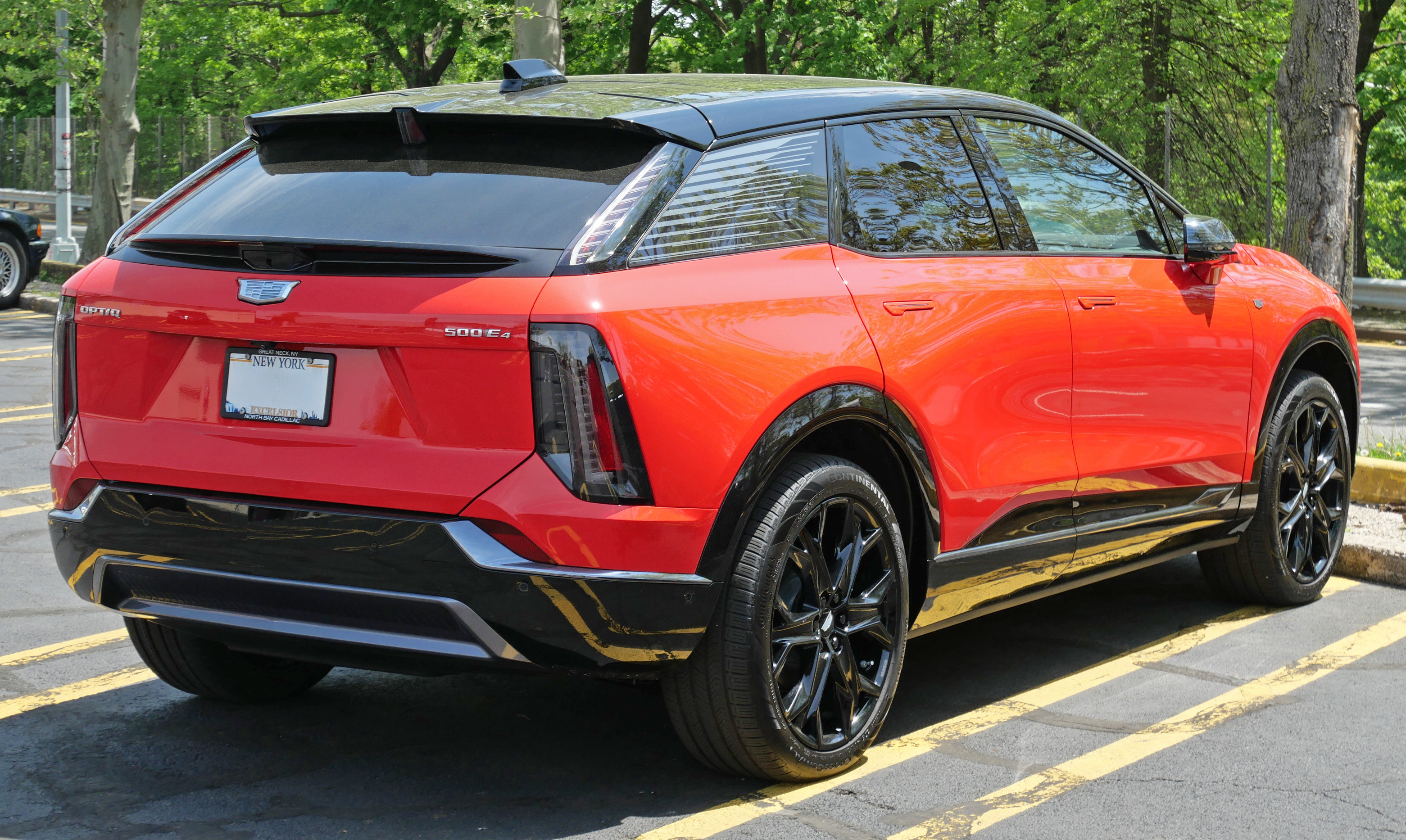
Rear view

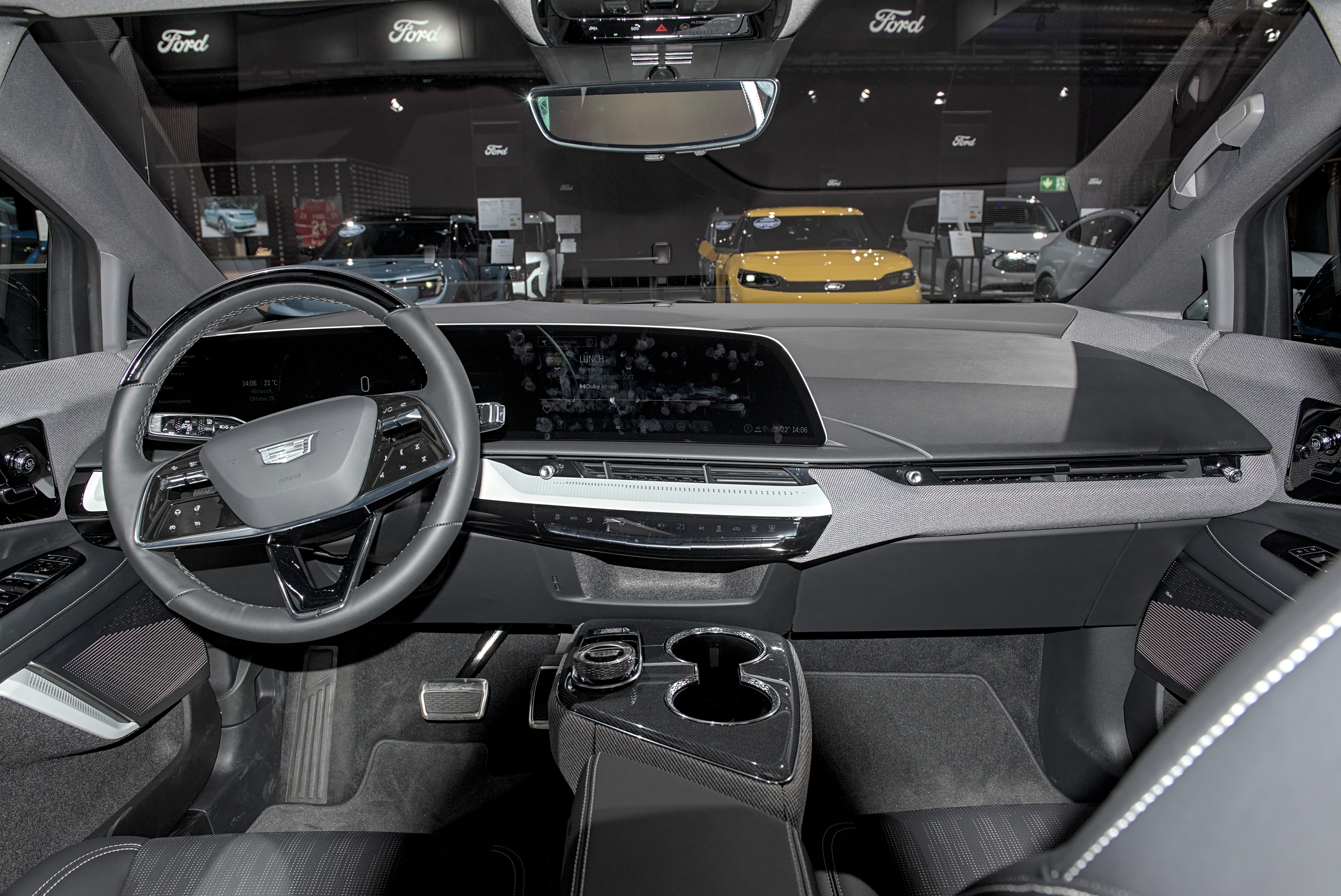
Interior

== Markets ==
=== Brazil ===
Exported from Mexico.

=== China ===
Pre-orders for the Optiq (Chinese: IQ傲歌; pinyin: IQ ào gē) opened in China in November 2023 at Auto Guangzhou 2023.

== Safety ==
Euro NCAP test results Cadillac Optiq, 'Premium Sport', AWD (LHD) (2025)
Test	Points	%
Overall:	5 /5 stars	
Adult occupant:	33.3	83%
Child occupant:	40.0	81%
Pedestrian:	48.3	76%
Safety assist:	13.4	74%

== Sales ==
Year	China	US	Canada
2024	2,374	—N/a	—N/a
2025	436	12,187	3,518
