= Permanent magnet motor =

Type of electric motor

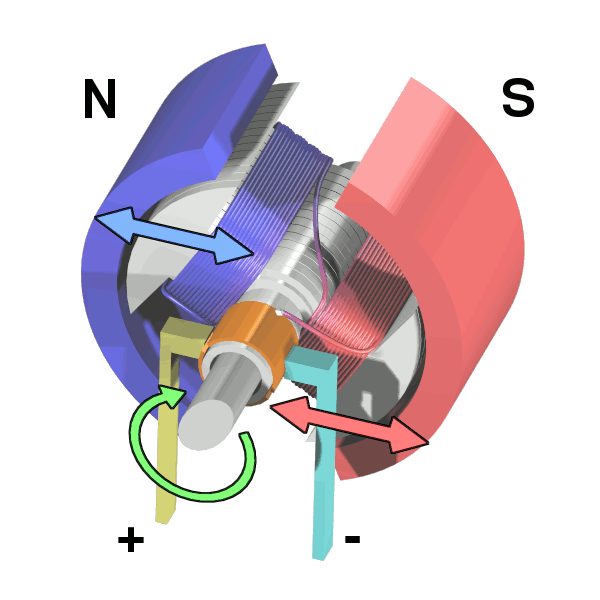
Schematic of a permanent magnet motor using brushes and magnets in the stator

A permanent magnet motor is a type of electric motor that uses permanent magnets for the field excitation and a wound armature. The permanent magnets can either be stationary or rotating; interior or exterior to the armature for a radial flux machine or layered with the armature for an axial flux topology. The schematic shows a permanent magnet motor with stationary magnets outside of a brushed armature (a type commonly used on toy slot-cars).

== Applications ==
=== Electric vehicles ===
This type of motor is used in GM's Chevrolet Bolt and Volt, and the rear wheel drive of Tesla's Model 3. Recent dual motor Tesla models use a combination of a permanent magnet motor at the back and traditional induction motor at the front.

Permanent magnet motors are more efficient than induction motor or motors with field windings for certain high-efficiency applications such as electric vehicles. Tesla's chief motor designer was quoted discussing these advantages, saying:

It's well known that permanent magnet machines have the benefit of pre-excitation from the magnets, and therefore you have some efficiency benefit for that. Induction machines have perfect flux regulation and therefore you can optimize your efficiency. Both make sense for variable-speed drive single-gear transmission as the drive units of the cars. So, as you know, our Model 3 has a permanent magnet machine now. This is because for the specification of the performance and efficiency, the permanent magnet machine better solved our cost minimization function, and it was optimal for the range and performance target. Quantitatively, the difference is what drives the future of the machine, and it's a trade-off between motor cost, range and battery cost that is determining which technology will be used in the future.

== Types ==
- Permanent magnet DC motors (powered by direct current)
- Permanent-magnet synchronous motors (powered by alternating current)

Permanent magnet motors consist of two main types. Surface permanent magnet motors (SPM) and internal permanent magnet (IPM) motors. The main difference is that SPM motors place the magnets on the outside of the rotor while IPM motors place their magnets inside the rotor. Benefits to internal magnets include structural integrity and reducing Back EMF. Since holes must be cut into the rotor for the placement of the magnets this creates areas of high reluctance allowing carmakers to obtain some of the benefits of reluctance motors as well as of permanent magnet motors.

== Back electromotive force ==
Back electromotive force (EMF) is also known as the counter-electromotive force. It is the voltage that occurs in electric motors from the relative motion between the stator windings and the rotor’s magnetic field. The rotor's geometry determines the waveform's shape.

This effect is not unique to permanent magnet motors. Induction motors also suffer from it. However in an induction motor the fields from the rotor decrease as speed increases. A permanent magnet motor generates its own constant field. This means that as speed increases a voltage is induced linearly with the speed on the stator. This voltage is negative to the voltage provided to the motor and thus is a loss to the overall system.

== Permanent magnetic motor materials ==
Many different permanent magnetic materials are used to drive permanent magnetic motors and vary based on multiple factors, principally necessary magnetic strength and cost. The four primary permanent magnetic materials that are found in the vast majority of industrial applications are neodymium iron boron (NdFeB), samarium cobalt (SmCo), aluminium nickel cobalt (Alnico), and strontium carbonate-iron oxide (also known as “ceramic magnet”); furthermore, significant materials science research is ongoing into the development of additional non-rare earth (NRE) permanent magnetic materials.

=== NdFeB magnets ===
NdFeB is the strongest of all permanent magnet materials used in industrial applications and sees wide use in many types of permanent magnetic motors, including in disc drive spindle motors, electric vehicle motors, alternators, and sensors, power tools, electricity generators, and magnetic resonance imaging (MRI). NdFeB exhibits a Curie temperature of approximately 320 °C, which is significantly above room temperature, as well as very high remanence, coercivity, and energy product which allow it excellent performance in permanent magnetic applications. The most common method of NdFeB magnet production is sintering of alloyed neodymium, iron, and boron, typically in a nominal composition of approximately Nd14Fe78B8 (at%); sintering promotes growth of the Nd2Fe14B phase which is responsible for the characteristic strong magnetic behavior seen in NdFeB magnets. However, this also leads to corrosion vulnerability in NdFeB magnets along sintered grain boundaries, which requires alleviation through the addition of copper-nickel or aluminum-based metallic surface coatings. In addition, the high cost, rarity, and radioactive waste associated with production of the metal neodymium as an input means that NdFeB magnets are very financially and environmentally expensive.

=== SmCo magnets ===
SmCo is a strong permanent magnetic material of comparable strength to NdFeB and is used across range of applications including very high-performance vehicle electric motors, NMR spectrometers, turbomachinery, and frictionless bearings. While NdFeB magnets exhibit a superior magnetic field, SmCo magnets have higher coercivity (i.e., less vulnerability to demagnetization) and better corrosion resistance. Furthermore, SmCo magnets have a Curie temperature exceeding 700 °C and superior temperature stability compared to NdFeB, making them more suitable for permanent magnetic motor applications involving high temperatures or cryogenic conditions. However, SmCo magnets contain a higher fraction of rare earth metals than NdFeB magnets, making them even more expensive and subject to the scarcity and environmental concerns of production; as such, SmCo magnets are now typically only used in specialty application cases where their particular temperature and coercivity advantages are significant.

=== Alnico magnets ===
Alnico is a NRE permanent magnetic material used in permanent magnet motor applications such as magnetic speed and flow sensors, electric generators, and consumer goods. These magnets exhibit weaker performance in comparison to NdFeB and SmCo counterparts but still maintain high coercivity and are far cheaper due to their lack of rare earth metals. Furthermore, the high fraction of both aluminum and iron within these magnets lends them excellent corrosion resistance, electrical conductivity, and high-temperature stability; Alnico has one of the highest Curie temperatures of any known magnetic material at nearly 800 °C. Despite this, Alnico’s comparatively low magnetic strength means it is one of the permanent magnets most susceptible to demagnetization, especially at cryogenic temperatures when constituent ferritic iron may transition to superconductivity.

=== Ceramic magnets ===
Strontium carbonate and iron oxide, also known as a “ceramic” or “ferrite” magnet, is a NRE permanent magnetic material found in permanent magnet motor applications such as power tools, industrial magnetic separation processes, and automotive sensors. Ceramic magnets are significantly weaker than either SmCo or NdFeB but are generally stronger than Alnico magnets, in addition to being both more corrosion resistant and lower cost. However, ceramic magnets exhibit poorer temperature stability in comparison to Alnico and lose magnetization relatively easily when exposed to temperature extremes both hot and cold, with a much lower Curie temperature around 450 °C and a susceptibility to the same ferrite-driven demagnetization phenomena as Alnico under cryogenic conditions.

=== Emerging permanent magnetic motor materials ===
Development of non-rare earth, low cost, mechanically robust, and high strength permanent magnetic materials is a vigorous and ongoing area of research. Some notable materials systems of current interest include iron-cobalt-molybdenum ternary alloys, nanostructured cobalt-platinum alloys, and meteoric-type ordered iron-nickel alloys.

== Environmental and supply concerns ==
Rare earth production has the consequence of generating waste with elevated radioactivity compared to the natural radioactivity of the ores (waste that is referred to by the US EPA as TENORM, or Technologically Enhanced Naturally Occurring Radioactive Materials). China, the top producer of neodymium, restricted shipments to Japan in 2010 during a controversy over disputed ownership of islands. China imposed strict export quotas on several rare earth metals, saying it wanted to control pollution and preserve resources. The quotas were lifted in 2015. Although neodymium is relatively abundant, global demand for neodymium outstripped production by about 10% in 2017.

== See also ==
- Induction motor
