= Cadillac Vistiq =

Battery electric mid-size luxury crossover SUV

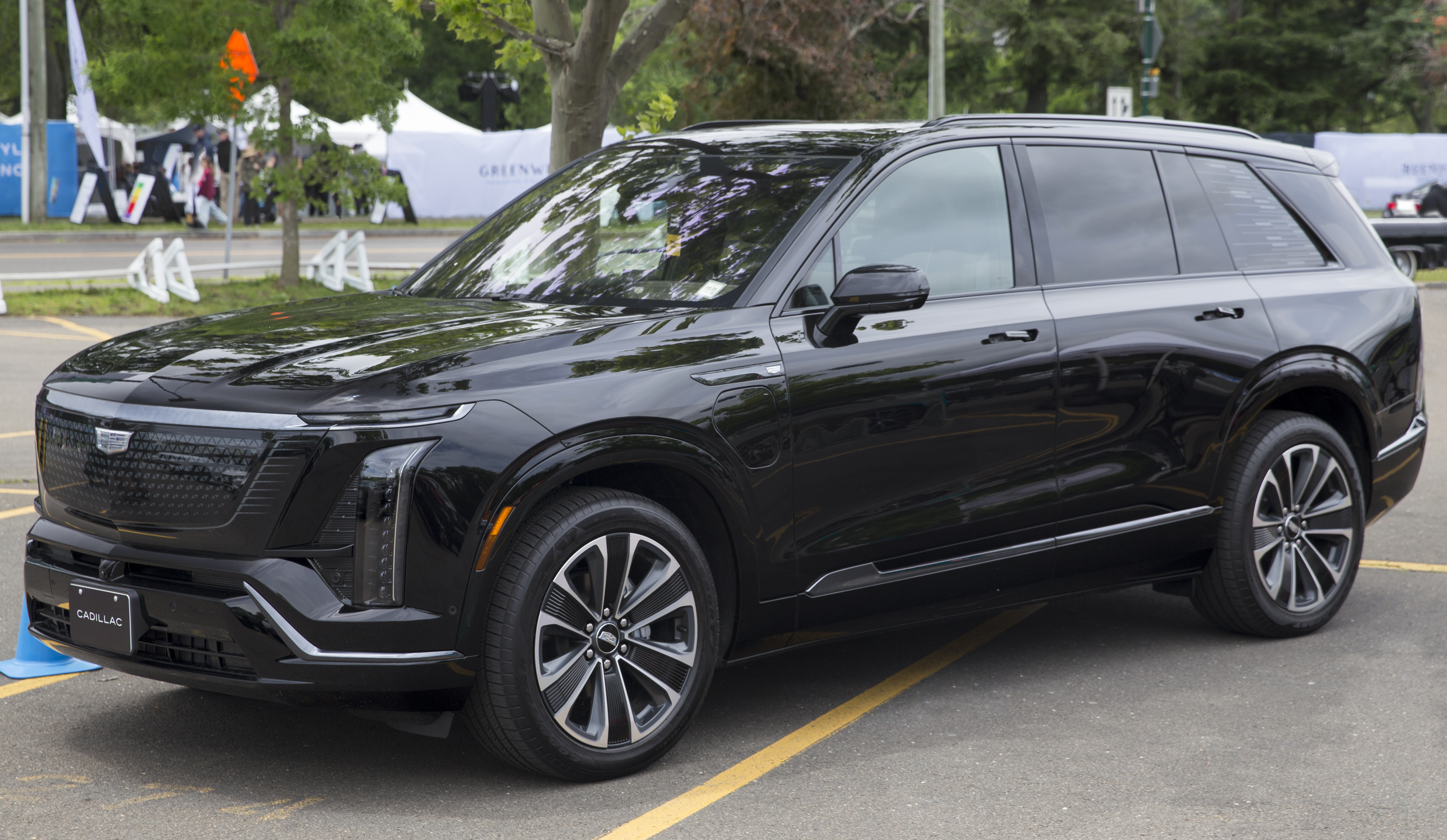

Overview
- Manufacturer: Cadillac (General Motors)
- Production: February 2025 – present
- Model years: 2026–present
- Assembly: United States: Spring Hill, Tennessee (Spring Hill Manufacturing); China: Shanghai (SAIC-GM)
- Designer: Zhou Fang

Body and chassis
- Class: Mid-size luxury crossover SUV
- Body style: 5-door SUV
- Layout: Dual-motor, all-wheel drive
- Platform: GM BEV3
- Related: Cadillac Lyriq; Chevrolet Blazer EV; Acura ZDX (second generation); Honda Prologue

Powertrain
- Electric motor: Permanent magnet synchronous AC
- Power output: 615 hp (459 kW; 624 PS)
- Battery: 102.0 kWh Ultium lithium-ion NCMA cathode
- Plug-in charging: 19.2 kW (AC); 190 kW (DC)

Dimensions
- Wheelbase: 121.8 in (3,094 mm)
- Length: 205.6 in (5,222 mm)
- Width: 79.8 in (2,027 mm)
- Height: 71.2 in (1,808 mm)
- Curb weight: 6,326 lb (2,869 kg)

Chronology
- Predecessor: Cadillac XT6

The Cadillac Vistiq is a battery electric mid-size luxury three-row crossover SUV manufactured and marketed by the Cadillac division of General Motors. Positioned between the two-row Lyriq and the full-size Escalade IQ, the Vistiq went on sale in 2025 for the 2026 model year.

== History ==
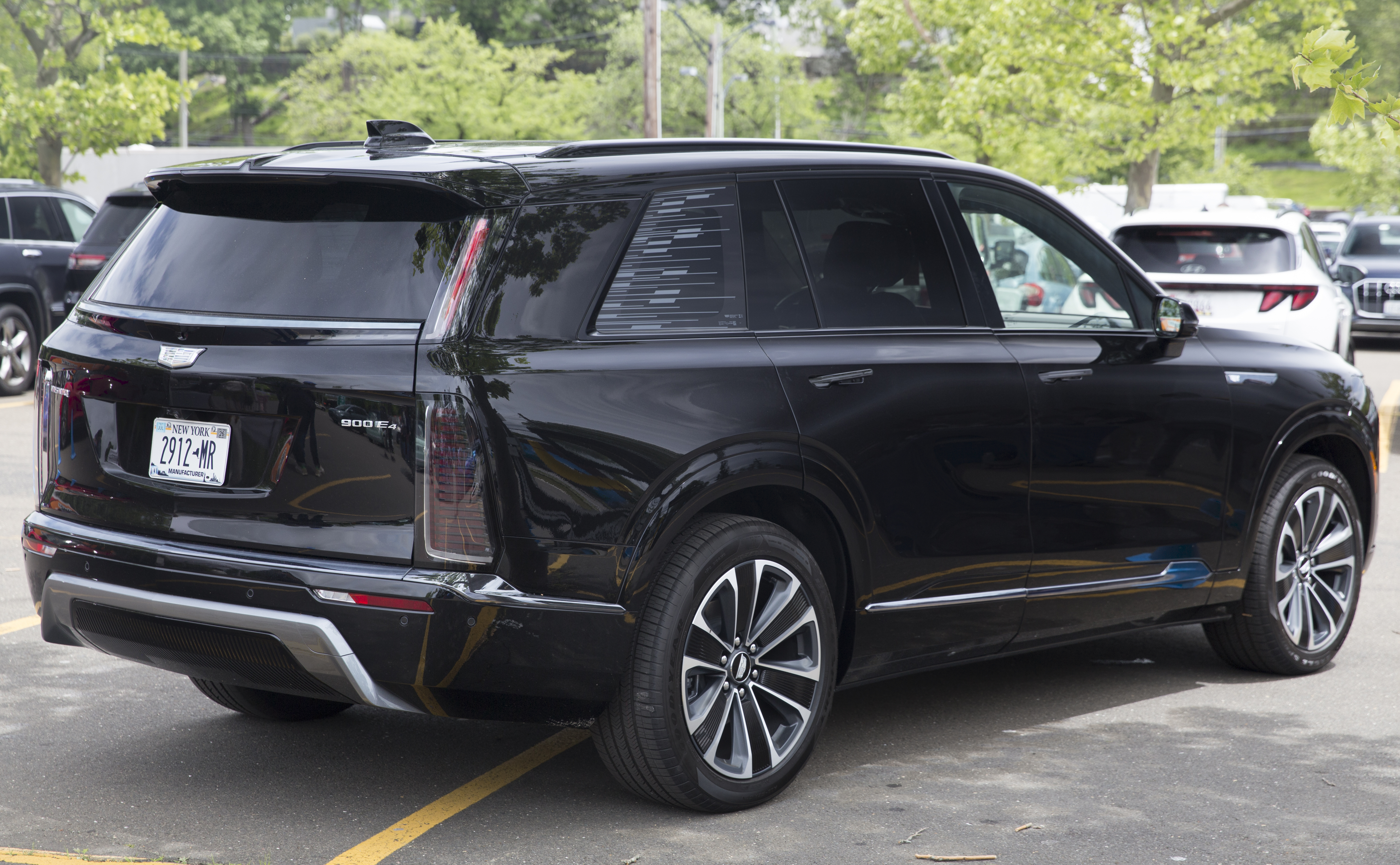
Cadillac Vistiq rear

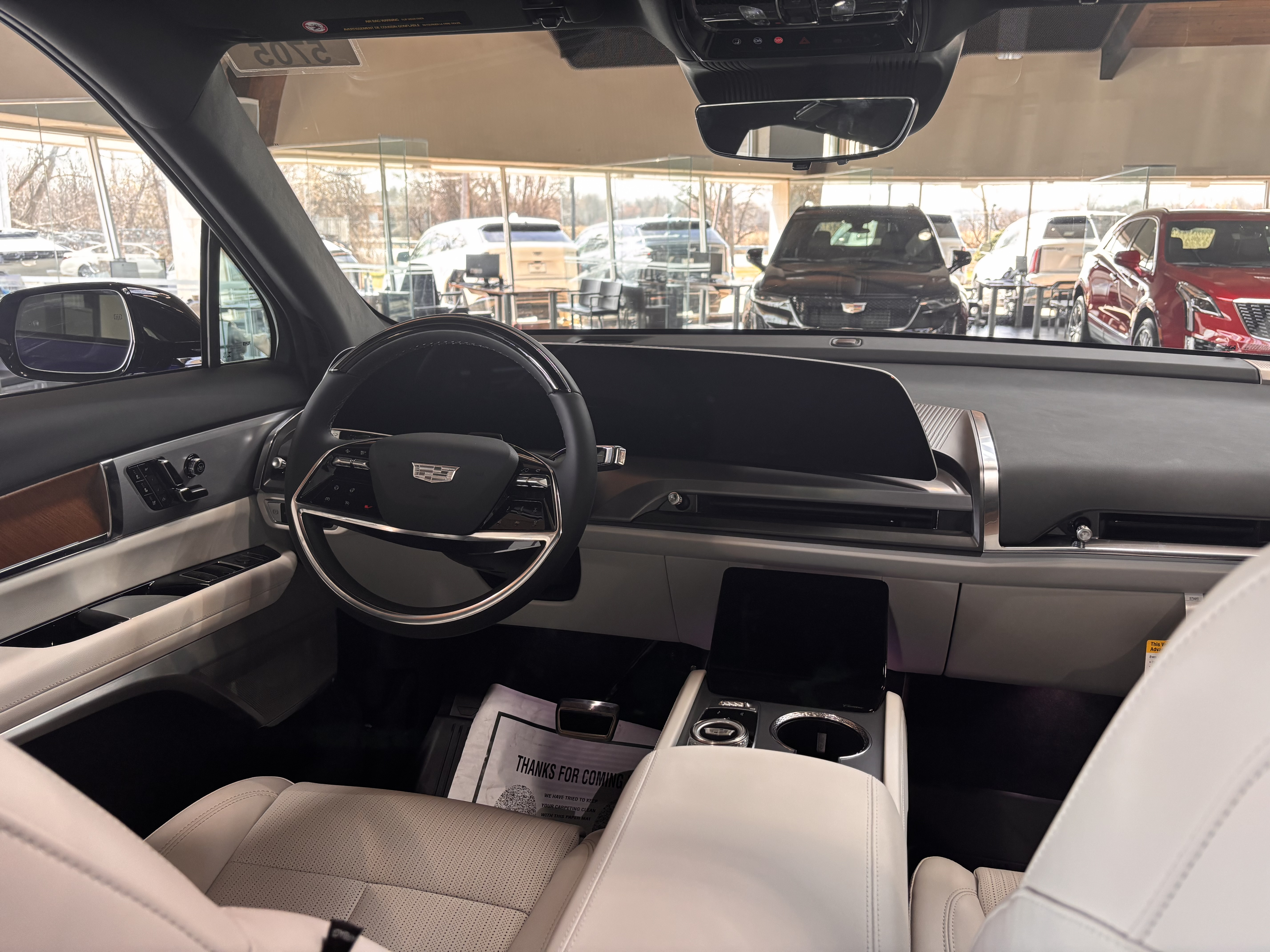
Interior

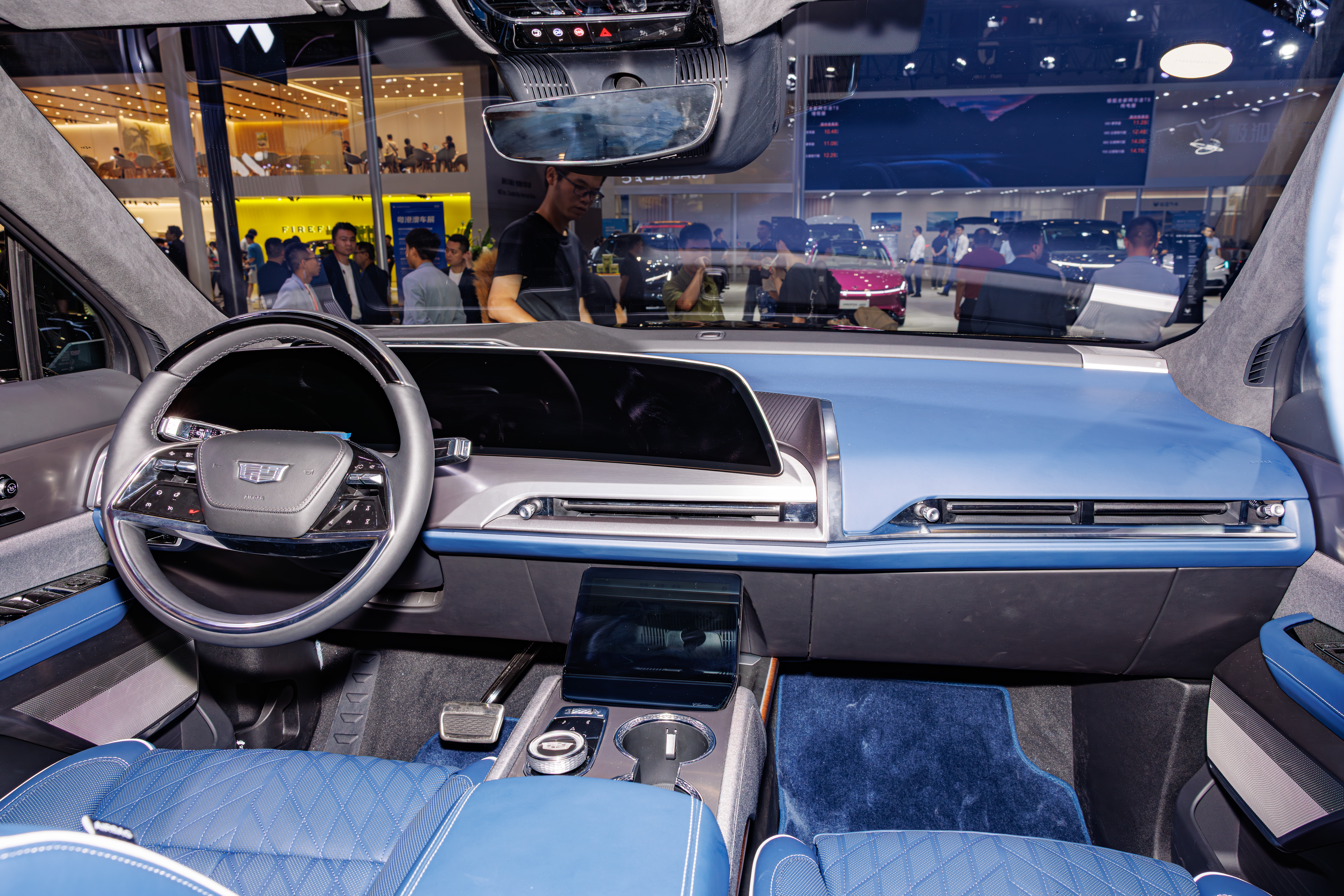
Interior (China)

The Vistiq debuted in North America and in selected European countries in 2025, as a 2026 model. In North America, Middle East, and Japan, it replaced the gasoline-powered Cadillac XT6 in the model lineup, which ended US production in 2025. A right-hand-drive version is scheduled to launch in Australia, New Zealand and Ireland in 2026.

== Markets ==
=== China ===
Pre-orders for the Vistiq (Chinese: 凯威德; pinyin: Kǎi wēi dé) opened in China in April 2025 at Auto Shanghai 2025. It launched in China in April 2026.

=== Middle East ===
The Cadillac Vistiq launched in the Middle East market in July 2026. It is sold in Luxury, Sport, and Premium Luxury trim levels. The Mondrian graphic on rear-quarter glass, while removed on 2027 models in North America, remains on the Middle Eastern model. A 23-speaker AKG Studio sound system and 3 years of OnStar (in supported countries) are standard.

== Sales ==
Year	US	Canada
2025	7,879	669
