= Ultium =

EV battery and motor architecture

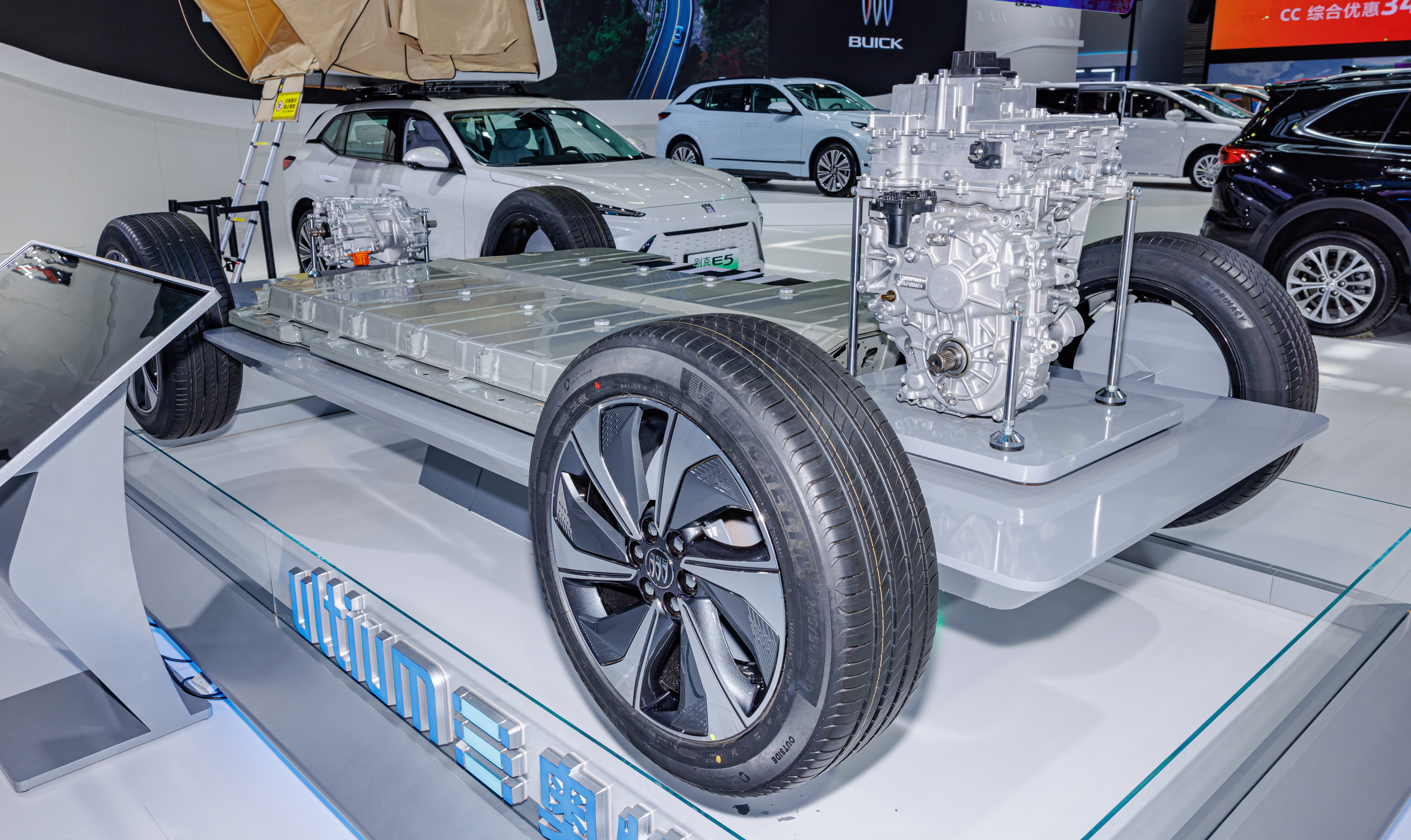
Ultium architecture at Shenzhen Auto Show (June 2023), showing flat, underfloor battery module (between the wheels) and front and rear Ultium Drive units.

Ultium is an electric vehicle battery and motor architecture developed by General Motors. It is being deployed for battery electric vehicles from General Motors portfolio brands along with vehicles from Honda and Acura.

Ultium is characterized by a modular layout, using an Ultium battery to supply power to one or two Ultium Drive unit(s) using a common set of power electronics (charging, battery management system, and inverter). The high-voltage battery is composed of pouch cells that can be stacked horizontally or vertically, depending on the form factor appropriate for each vehicle, generally carried between the axles and under the floor. The traction motor(s), reduction gear, and power electronics are combined into a single Ultium Drive unit that drives the front, rear, or both axles. Three electric motor designs, sharing a common stator, are used across all planned vehicles. Ultium is used by GM's BEV3 and BT1 platforms.

== History ==
General Motors revealed the Ultium battery and platform technologies during a week-long March 2020 event held at the General Motors Technical Center in Warren, Michigan; GM chairwoman and CEO Mary Barra called it "a multi-brand, multi-segment EV strategy with economies of scale that rival our full-size truck business with much less complexity and even more flexibility". The Ultium Drive branding was applied six months later in September 2020, referring to electric vehicle drivetrain components exclusive of the batteries, such as the traction motors and power electronics.

GM announced in June 2021 it would collaborate with Wabtec to provide Ultium battery modules for zero-emission heavy-haul locomotives, including the FLXDrive.

In 2022, the US Army selected GM Defense to demonstrate an electric military vehicle, using the GMC Hummer EV pickup. In September, GM Defense was chosen to build a heavy-duty pack to power electric military vehicles.

== Design ==
=== Ultium Drive ===
Ultium vehicles are powered by a modular family of five drive units and three electric traction motors, known collectively as "Ultium Drive". Mass production of Ultium Drive motors and units was scheduled to start in 2024 at the GM Toledo and St. Catharines propulsion factories.

==== Traction motors ====
Planned motors include:

- A 180 kW (245 PS; 241 hp) front-drive permanent magnet motor
- A 255 kW (347 PS; 342 hp) front-drive or rear-drive permanent magnet motor
- A 62 kW (84 PS; 83 hp) all-wheel drive assist induction motor

The motors are suitable for front-wheel drive, rear-wheel drive and all-wheel drive configurations. For example, the GMC Hummer EV prototype shown in March 2020 has full-time all-wheel drive and is equipped with three 255 kW (342 hp) motors, one driving the front axle and the other two driving the rear wheels. The three traction motor types are oil-cooled and share a common stator design.

==== Drive units ====
The drive units are single-speed reduction gearboxes that accept one or two traction motors to power the wheels. The gearboxes are integrated with drivetrain electronic control modules. These modules, also known as power electronics, include the traction power inverter, onboard charging module, and accessory power module; integration of these modules into the drive units results in a combined mass that is half that of the equivalent components of the Chevrolet Bolt EV. These drive units are designed and packaged based on the intended drivetrain layout, but share many common components. The five units are:

- AWD 'assist' unit
- FWD unit
- RWD unit
- FWD/RWD unit for trucks
- RWD dual-motor unit for trucks

For the GMC Hummer EV, the drive units provide reduction ratios of 13.3:1 and 10.5:1 for the front and rear wheels, respectively.

=== Ultium battery ===
==== Chemistry ====
Ultium battery cells feature nickel-cobalt-manganese-aluminum (NCMA) chemistry, manufactured by Ultium Cells LLC, a joint-venture of GM and LG Energy Solution as large format pouch cells. Battery materials will be supplied by LG Chem and POSCO Chemical (cathode active materials) and Livent (lithium hydroxide).

In China, Ultium-branded battery cells use nickel-manganese-cobalt (NMC) chemistry and are manufactured by CATL with cylindrical packaging. With the announcement of the joint venture with Samsung SDI for the fourth US battery plant in April 2023, prismatic and cylindrical Ultium battery cells will be produced domestically.

The second-generation Chevrolet Bolt EV uses Ultium cells with lithium iron phosphate chemistry, which will reduce peak and nominal cell voltage.

==== Specifications ====
Each Ultium pouch cell measures approximately 23 by 4 by 0.4 in (584 by 102 by 10 mm) and weighs 3.0 lb (1.36 kg), capable of storing 0.37 kWh; the nominal voltage is 3.7 V and it is rated at 103 Ah. The gravimetric energy density of each cell is 127 Wh/lb (280 Wh/kg); the corresponding volumetric energy density is 10.4 Wh/in^{3} (630 Wh/L). It has a 10-second gravimetric power density of 952 W/kg. For example, the total weight of the 24-module, 576-cell battery for the Hummer EV, with 212.7 kWh usable storage capacity, is 2,923 lb (1,326 kg). Pouches may be oriented horizontally or vertically, affording packaging flexibility.

Ultium features a wireless battery management system (wBMS), the first such architecture from any automaker. The wBMS was developed in partnership with Analog Devices and contributes to reduced battery costs, as it requires 90% less wiring and reduces volume by 15%.

In late January 2023, it was reported that GM was considering switching to batteries in a cylindrical cell format. This move would reduce volumetric energy density, but could reduce production time and costs.

==== Assembly ====
GM announced that cells can be assembled into modules with various configurations and demonstrated three examples:

- 24 cells vertically stacked, or
- 20 cells: 10+10 cells next to each other, each pile horizontally stacked (to reduce module width), or
- 12 cells: 6+6 cells next to each other, each pile horizontally stacked (to reduce module width and height).

This way, multiple module sizes are possible, which could be mixed and matched for a certain application and platform.

For example, when 24 cells are combined into a module, and a battery pack is made from 6 to 24 identical modules, this means the pack includes 144 to 576 cells, with a capacity ranging from 50 to 200 kWh. A 24-cell module is wired with three parallel strings of eight cells, each wired together in series, giving a nominal voltage of 29.6 V per module. GM claims that they can survive repeated DC fast charging.

For the GMC Hummer EV, there are two layers. At each layer, 12 modules are wired in series, creating a 400 V, 100 kWh battery layer; these two layers are then stacked and wired in parallel, yielding 200 kWh storage capacity for electric motors at the 400V level. For charging at 800V DC fast charging stations however, the two layers can be temporarily switched to be wired in series, allowing for DC fast charging at up to 800 V and 350 kW. The Cadillac Lyriq has a 12-module battery pack, essentially equivalent to a single layer of the Hummer, operating at 400 V (nominal) and capable of charging at a rate of up to 190 kW. Due to the modular nature of the battery pack, vehicles using fewer than 12 battery modules will operate at lower nominal voltages.

In 2024, it was reported by InsideEVs that issues with the machines used to assemble cells into modules had resulted in delays in vehicle production during 2023; it proved to be impossible to increase production speed from 5 to 30 modules per hour per assembly line, but GM was adding module assembly lines to compensate.

==== Cost ====
In 2010, the cost of the 16 kWh battery in the Chevrolet Volt was estimated at US$1,000 (equivalent to $1,500 in 2025) per kilowatt-hour. With Ultium, GM estimates the cost will be reduced by 90% to approximately $100/kWh. This also is a significant reduction compared to the 60 kWh battery in the Chevrolet Bolt EV, which was priced at approximately $262/kWh in 2017, although GM had negotiated a significantly lower price of $145/kWh from its supplier, LG Chem. Part of the cost reduction results from the novel chemistry, which has 70% less cobalt than the Bolt's battery. In addition, labor costs are reduced because the wiring in each battery pack has been reduced by 88% compared to the Bolt due to the wireless battery management system.

==== Production ====
Four production facilities were planned as of 2021; they have since been announced as:

- Ultium Cells LLC – Warren, Ohio, USA (Opened September 2022, 35GWh per year capacity)
- Ultium Cells LLC – Spring Hill, Tennessee, USA (Opened March 2024, 50GWh per year capacity). This plant is planning to be retro-fit and targets LFP battery production by late 2027
- Ultium Cells LLC – Lansing, Michigan, USA (Opening late-2024, 50GWh per year capacity). GM's stake in plant has since been sold to LG Energy Solutions.
- GM/Samsung SDI joint venture – New Carlisle, Indiana, USA (Opening 2026, >30GWh per year capacity).

GM also opened an Ultium Center factory in October 2021 in Shanghai, which produces batteries and traction motors for EVs produced and sold in China. In 2022, the United States Department of Energy (DOE) provided a $2.5 billion loan to Ultium Cells to assist in the construction of the three announced plants in the US. It is the first loan from DOE to a battery cell producer under the DOE's Advanced Technology Vehicles Manufacturing program.

In January 2023, GM and LG paused plans to build the fourth battery plant in the United States after having selected the Indiana site the previous August, with GM seeking a new joint venture partner. Later that year, Samsung SDI announced it was entering a joint venture with GM, and the fourth plant would proceed at the Indiana site.

Lower than expected Ultium battery cell production caused GM to idle production of BrightDrop Zevo vans in July 2023. At that time, GM announced plans to expand Ultium module production to CAMI Assembly, where the Zevo vans are built, using cells shipped from the battery production facilities; starting in 2024, Ultium modules assembled at CAMI will be used on-site and shipped to other GM EV plants. In addition, battery module production lines were added to GM's other EV assembly plants, including Factory Zero, Spring Hill, and Ramos Arizpe, each assembling modules using battery cells made at the Warren and Spring Hill Ultium factories.

By the end of the fourth quarter in 2023, the Ultium Cells Ohio plant was running at full capacity. Ultium Cells Spring Hills began shipping cells in March 2024. In December 2024, GM announced it would sell its stake in Ultium Cells Lansing to LG, with the transaction expected to close in the first quarter of 2025.

== Vehicles using Ultium ==
- Acura ZDX (2024–2025)
- Buick Electra E5 (2023–present)
- Buick Electra E4 (2023–2025)
- Cadillac Celestiq (2024–present)
- Cadillac Escalade IQ and IQL (2024–present)
- Cadillac Lyriq (2023–present)
- Cadillac Optiq (2024–present)
- Cadillac Vistiq (2025–present)
- Chevrolet Blazer EV (2024–present)
- Chevrolet Equinox EV (2024–present)
- Chevrolet Silverado EV (2024–present)
- Chevrolet BrightDrop 400 (2024–2025)
- Chevrolet BrightDrop 600 (2021–2025)
- GMC Hummer EV (2022–present)
- GMC Sierra EV (2024–present)
- Honda Prologue (2024-present)
- Chevrolet Bolt (2026)
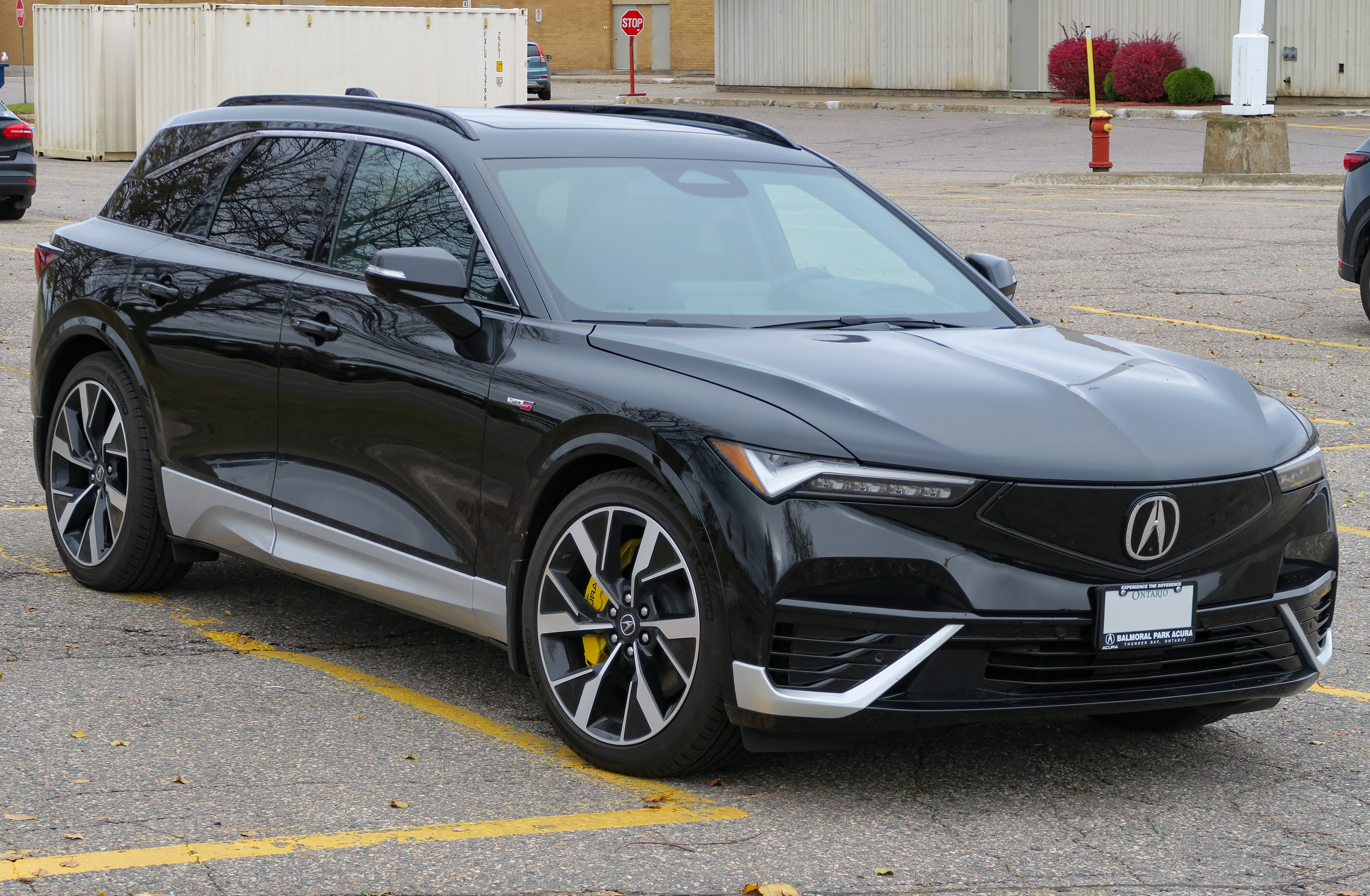
2024 Acura ZDX

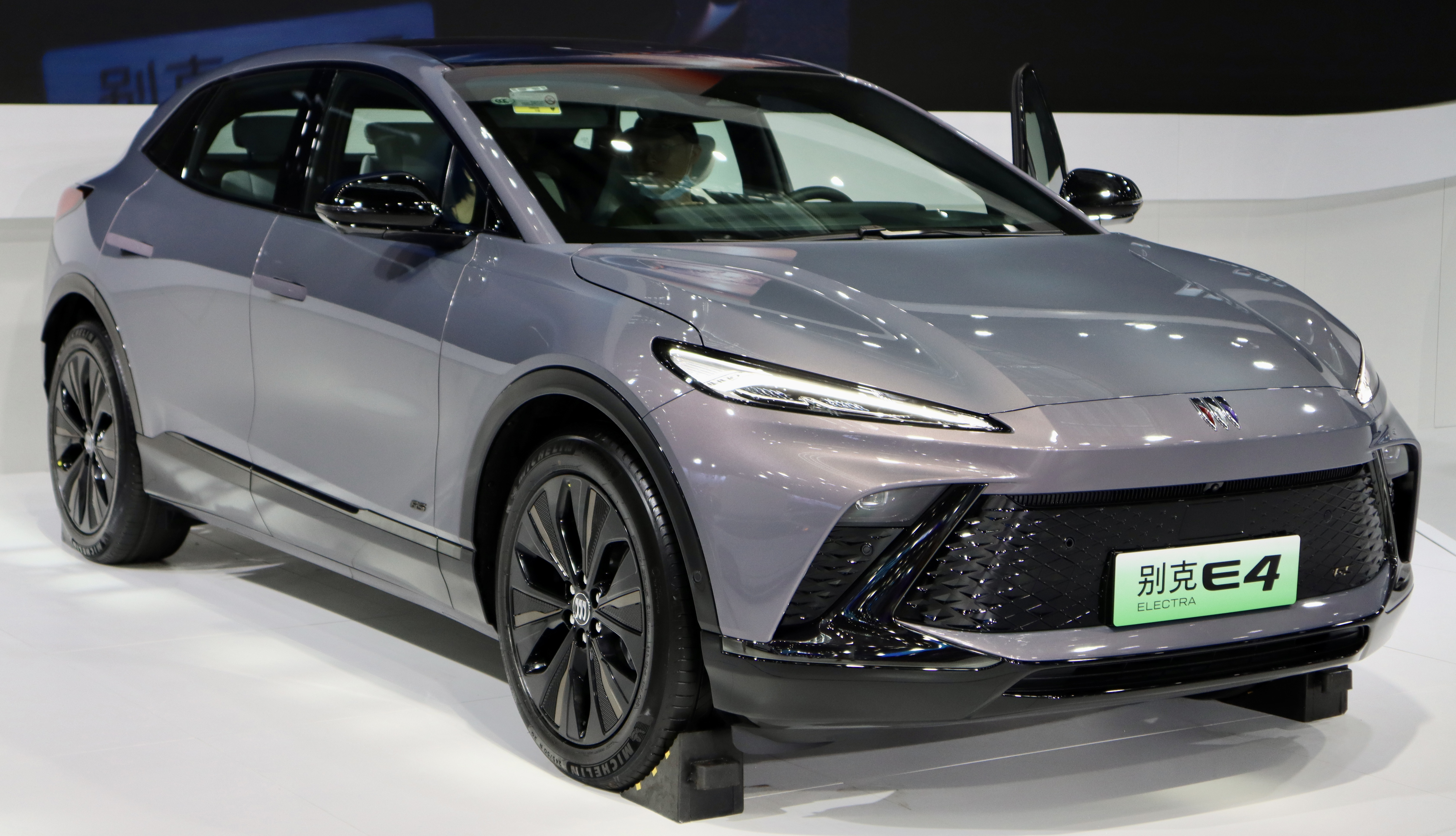
2023 Buick Electra E4

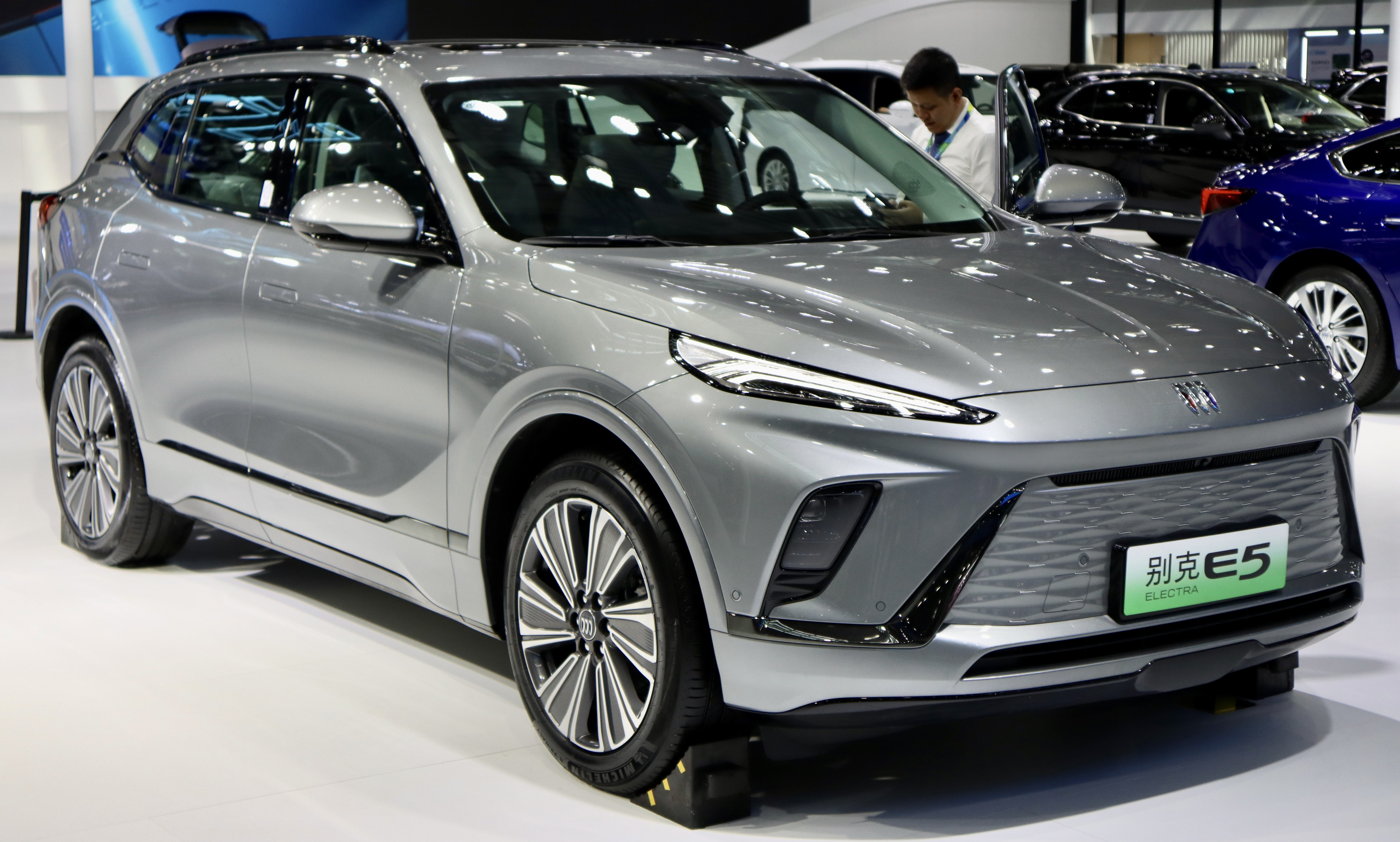
2023 Buick Electra E5

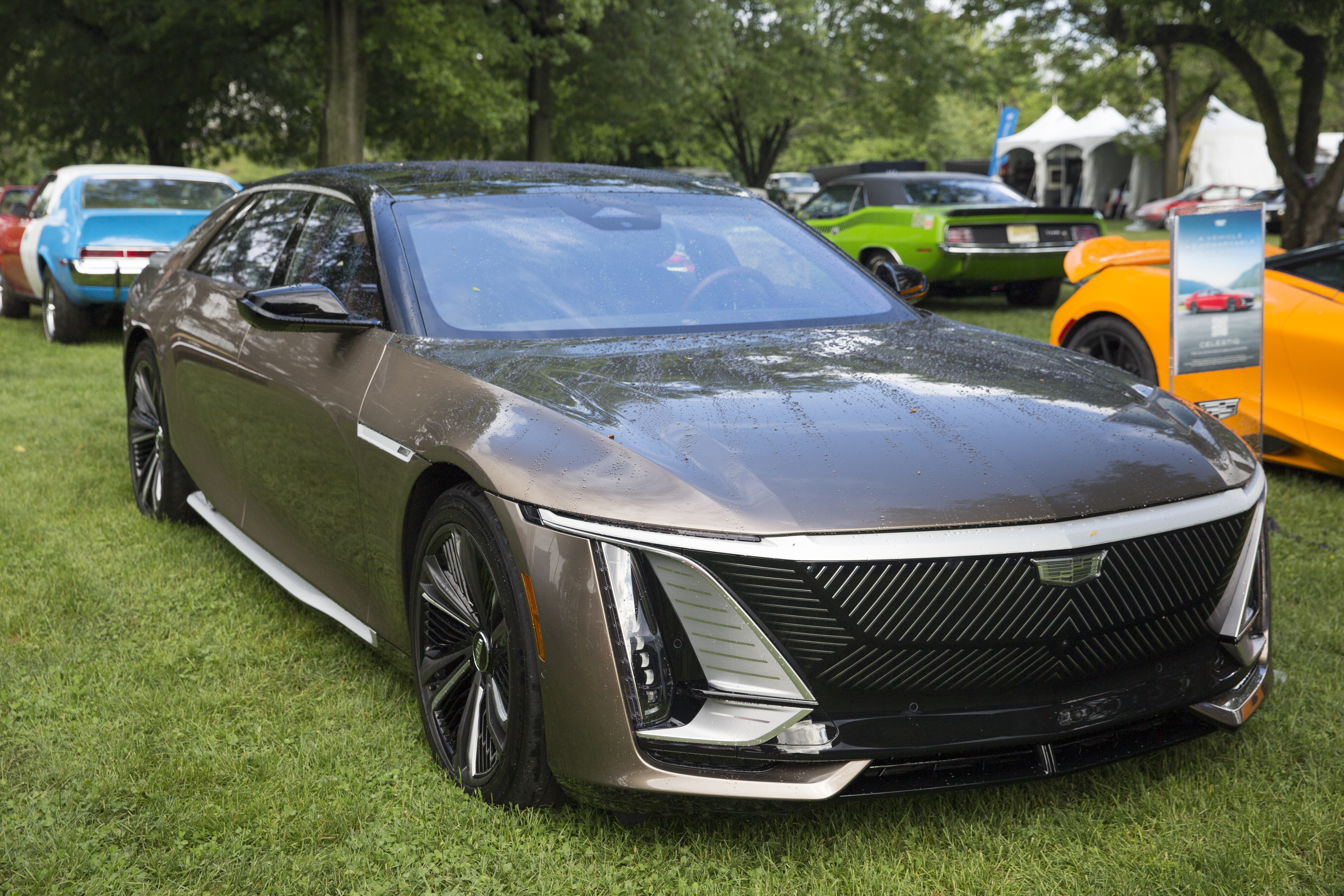
2022 Cadillac Celestiq

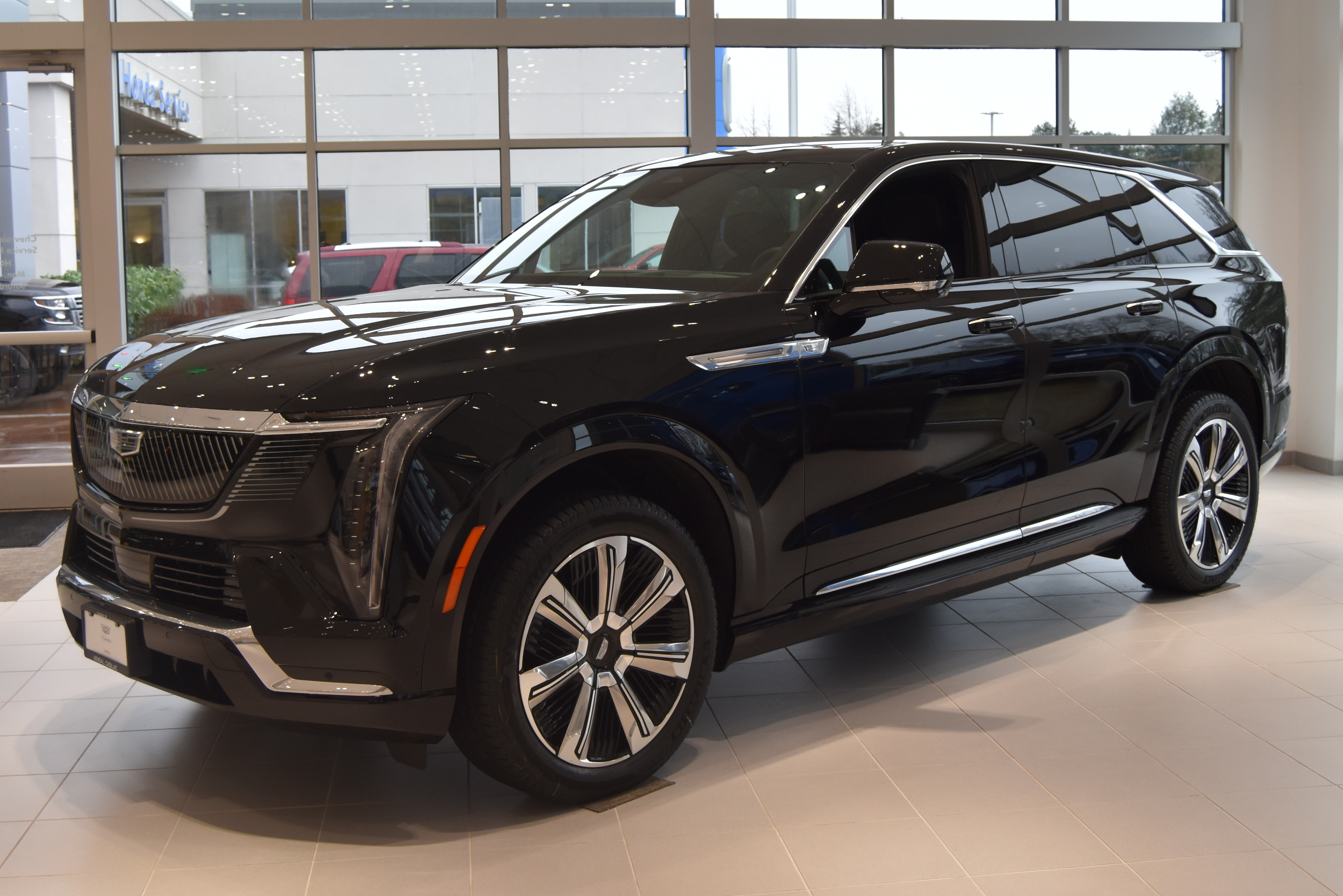
2025 Cadillac Escalade IQ

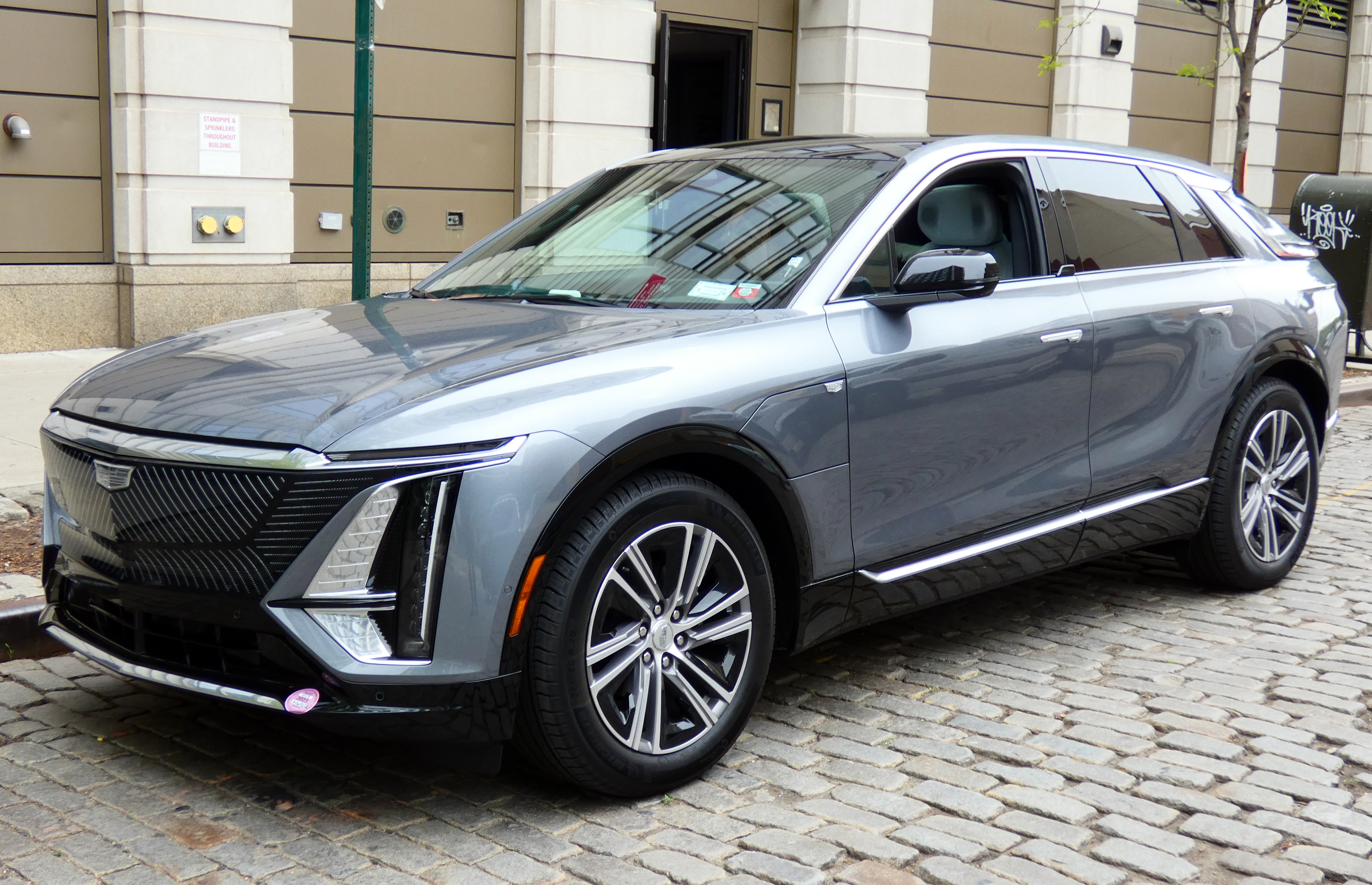
2023 Cadillac Lyriq

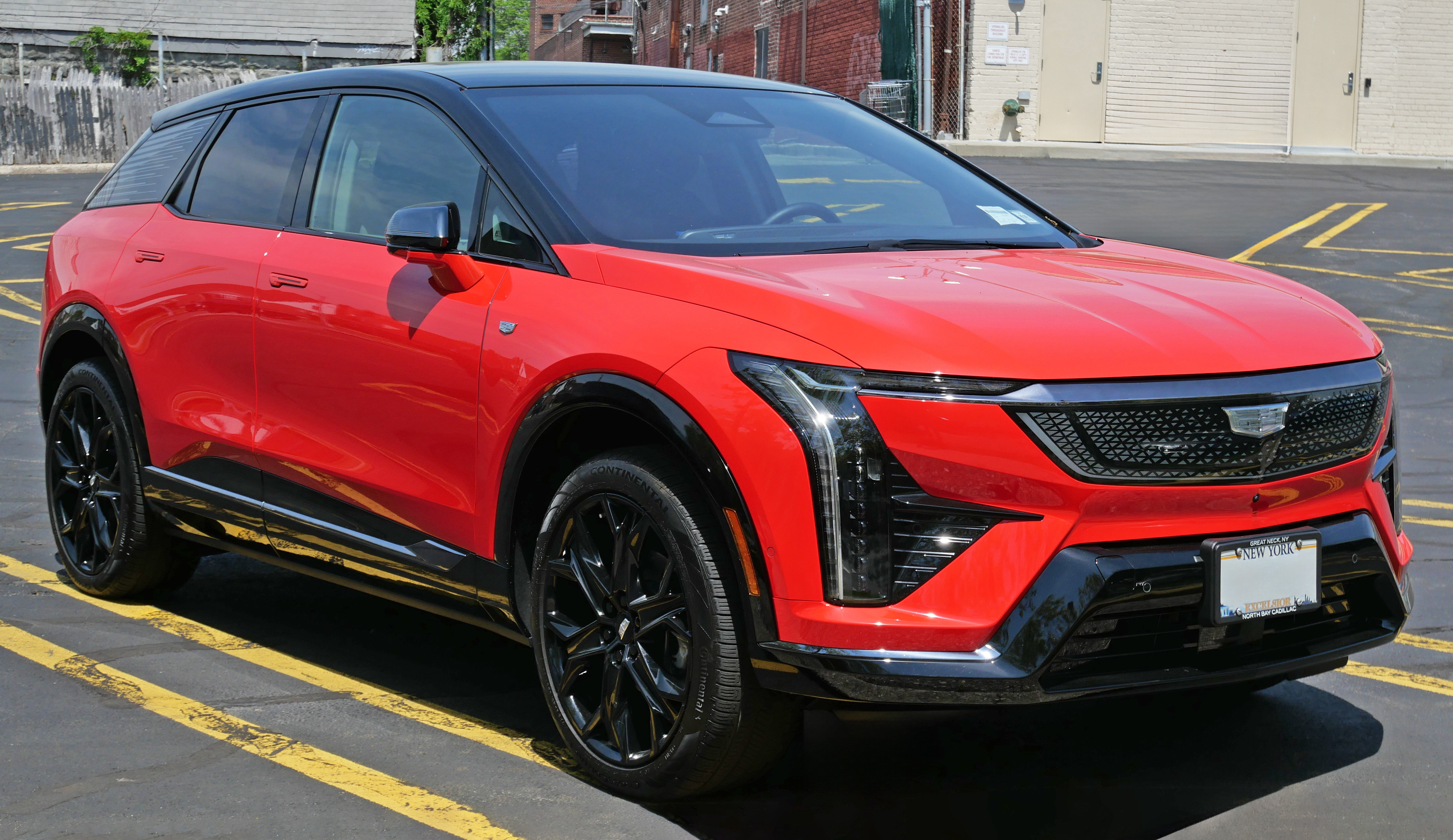
2024 Cadillac Optiq

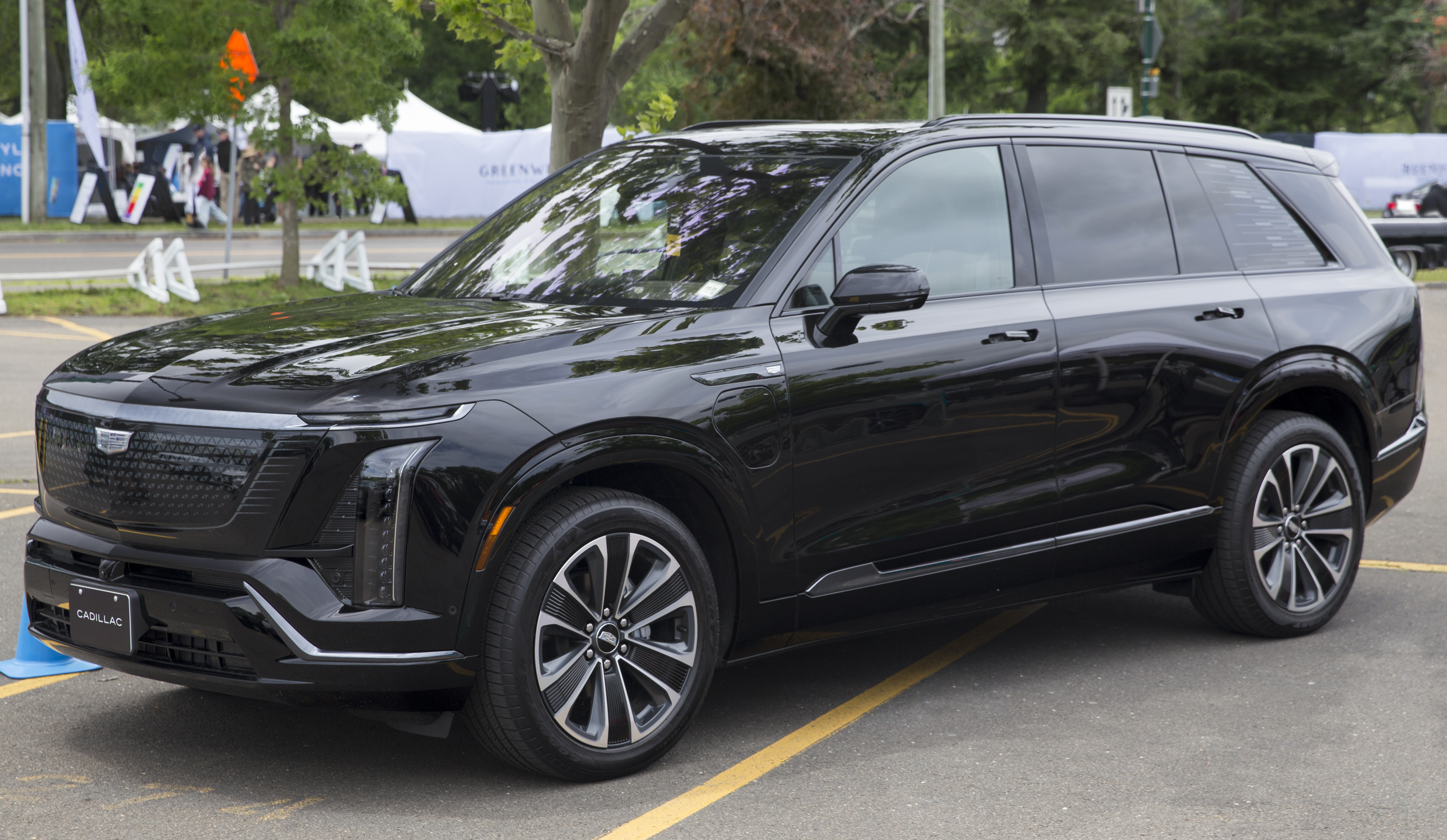
2026 Cadillac Vistiq

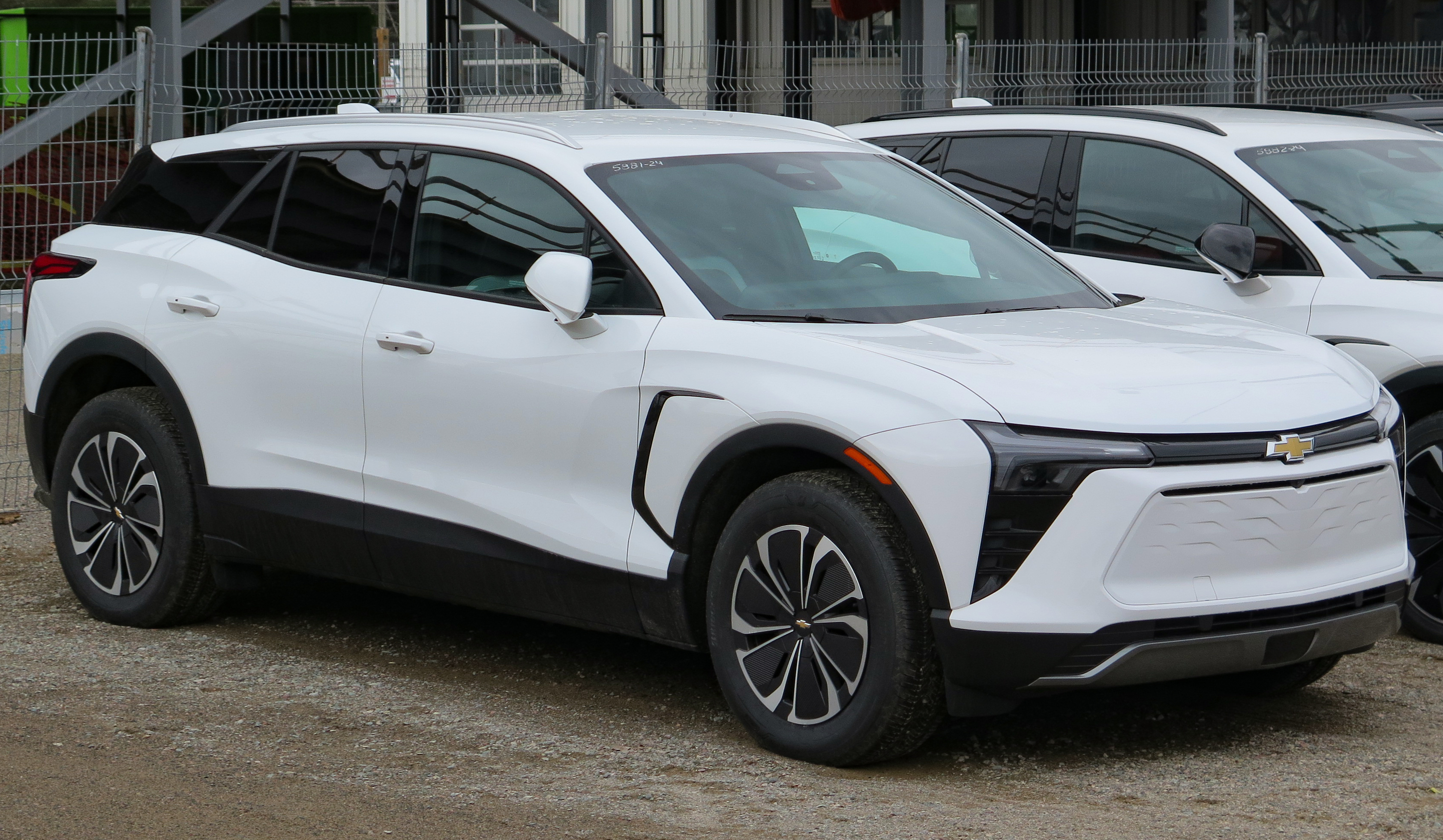
2024 Chevrolet Blazer EV

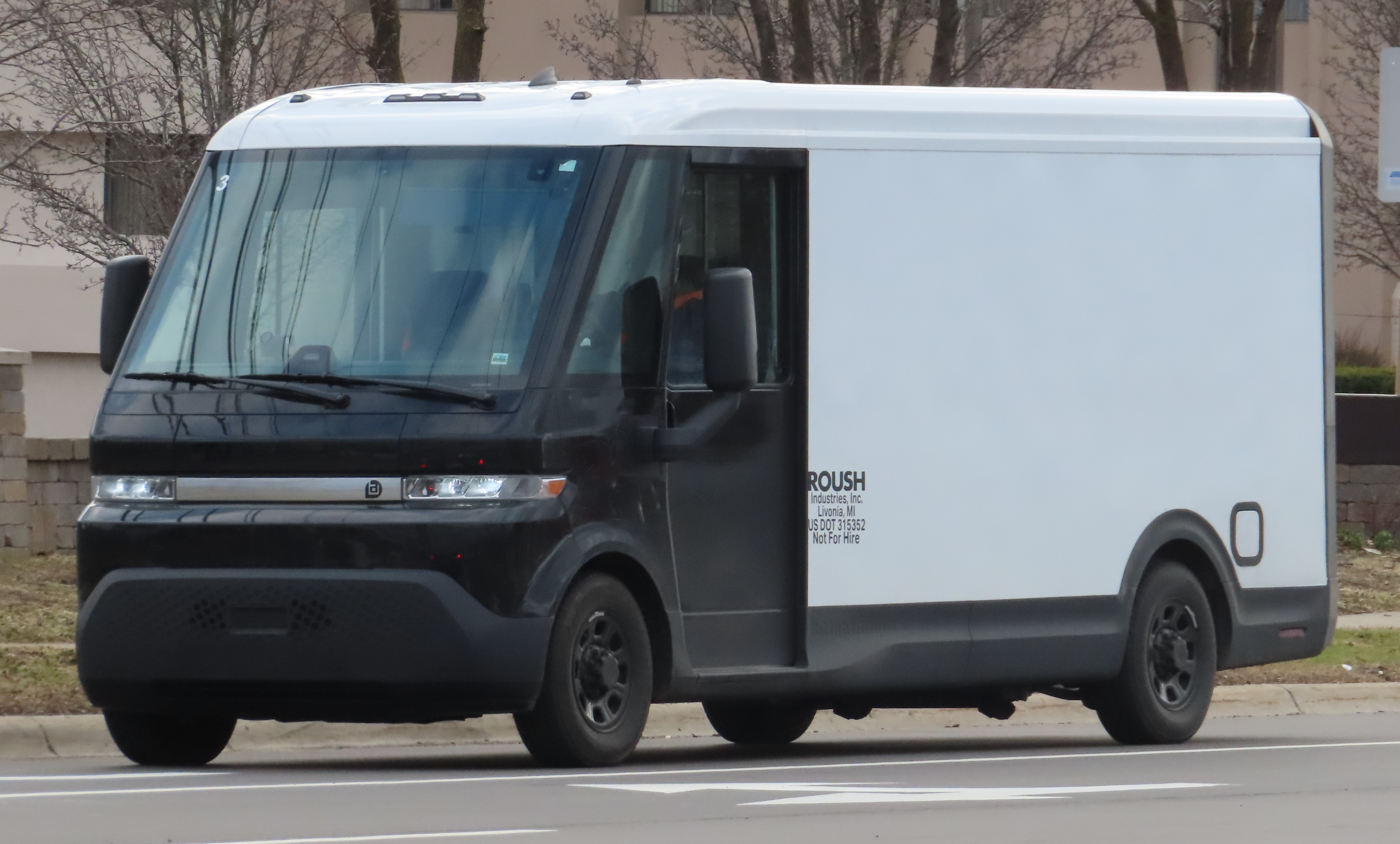
2022 Chevrolet BrightDrop 600

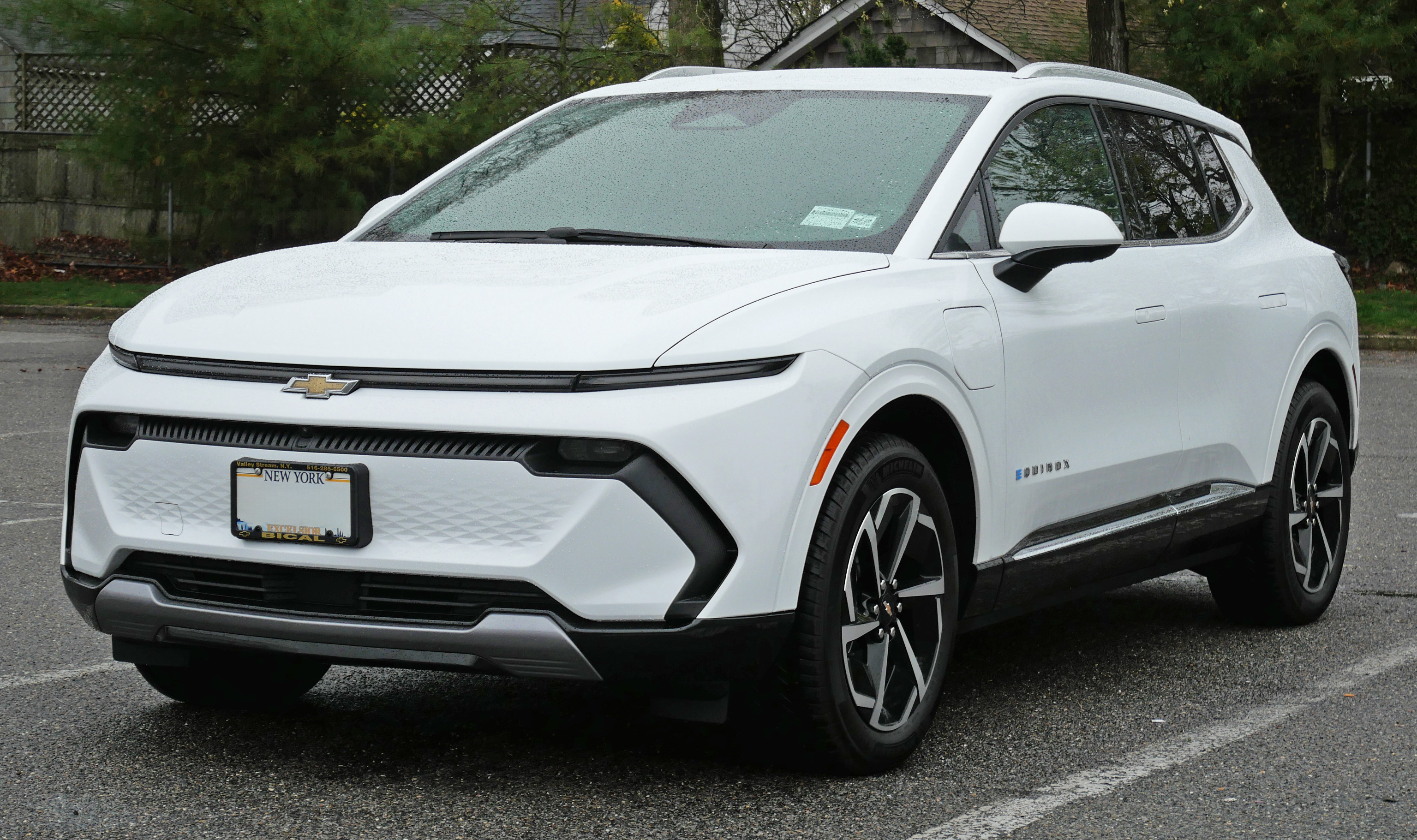
2024 Chevrolet Equinox EV

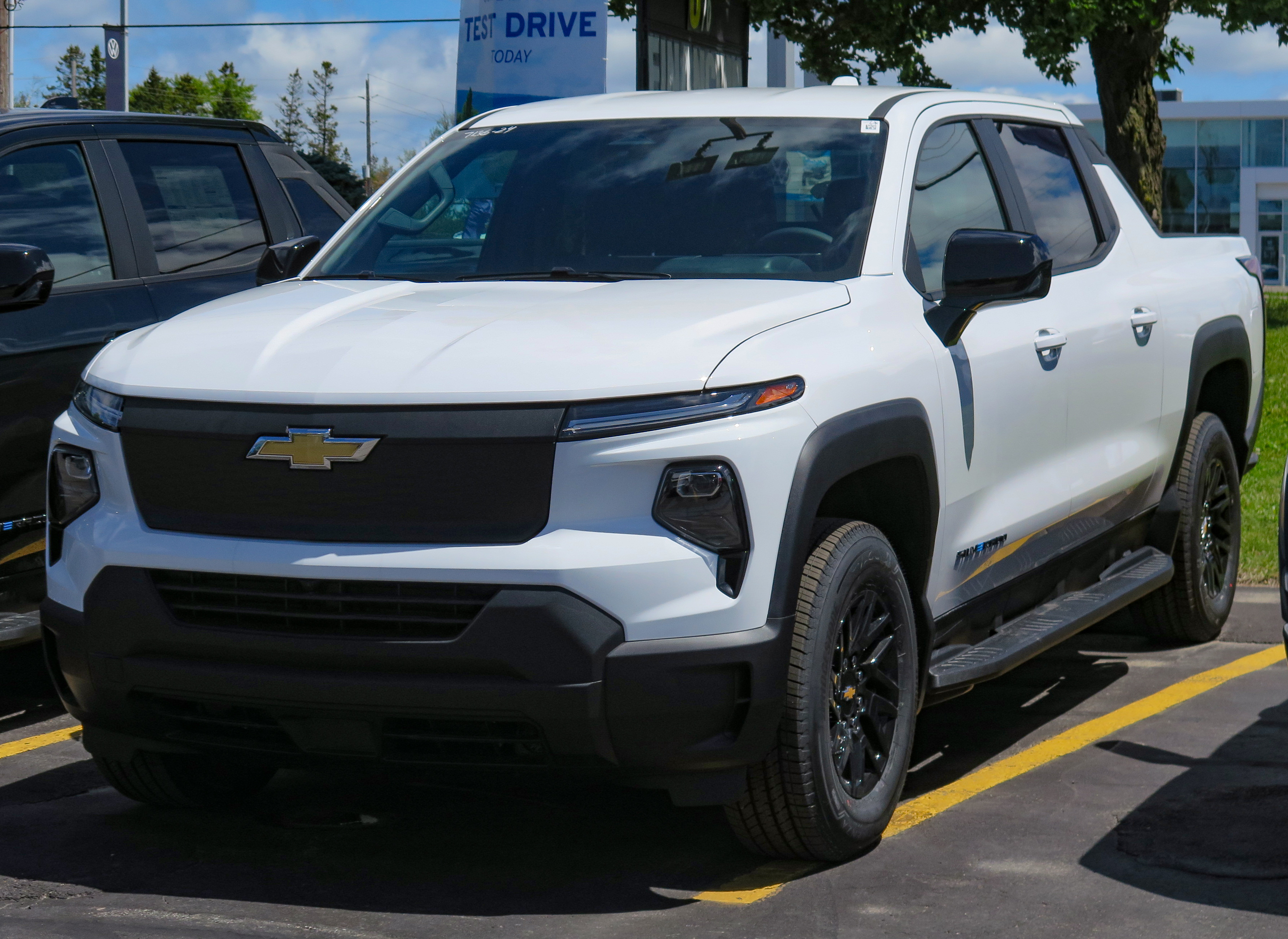
2024 Chevrolet Silverado EV

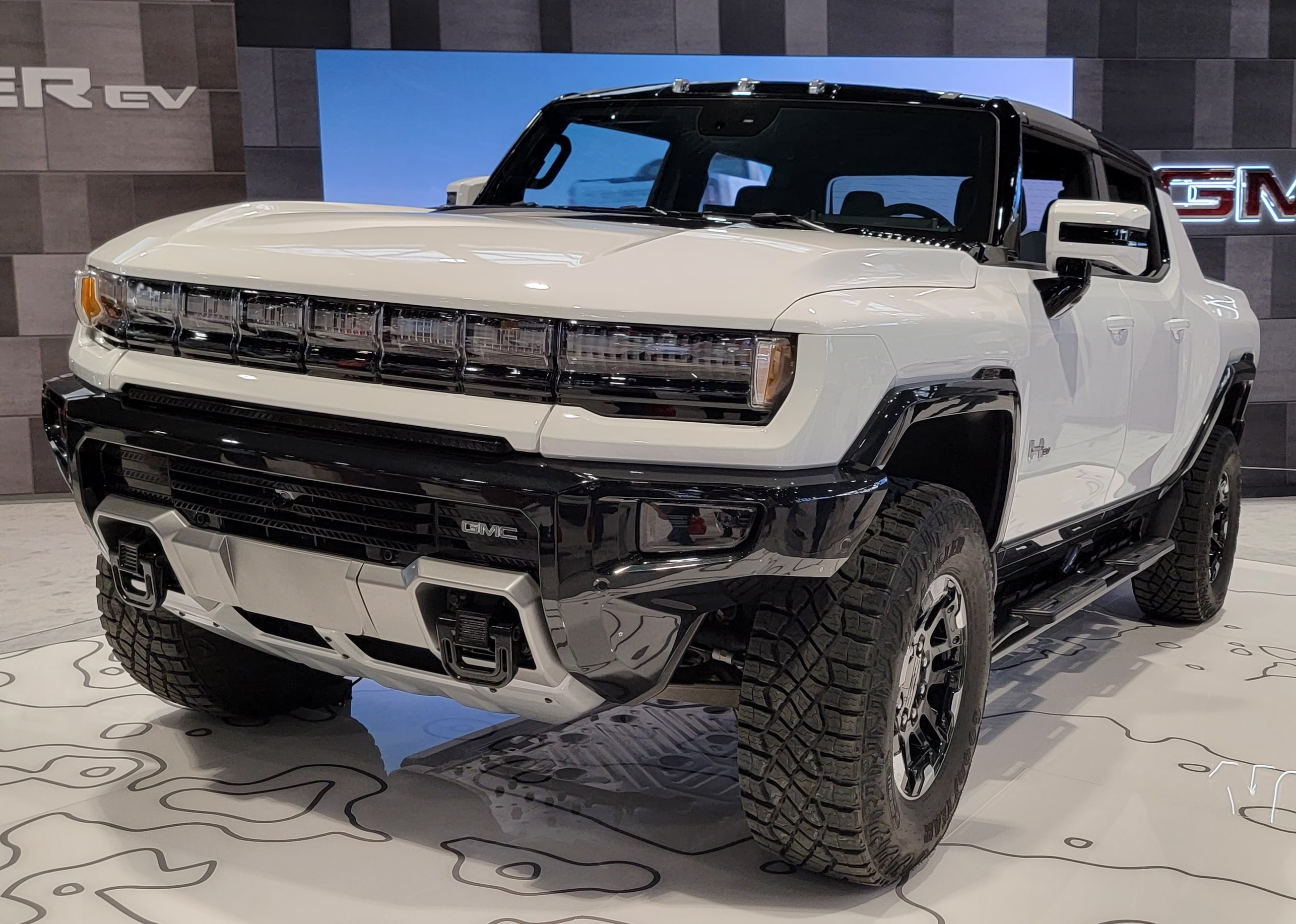
2022 GMC Hummer EV SUT

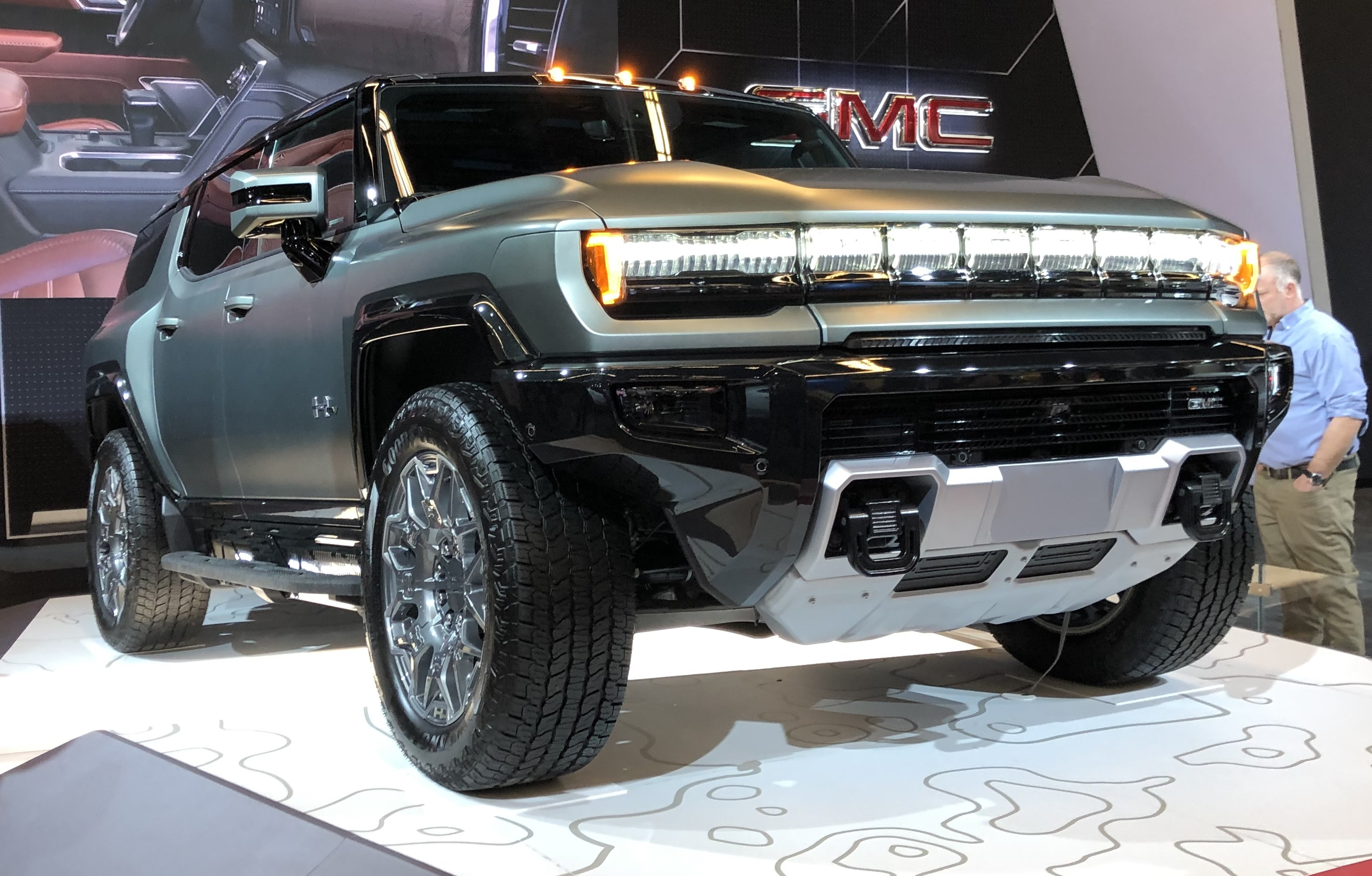
2024 GMC Hummer EV SUV

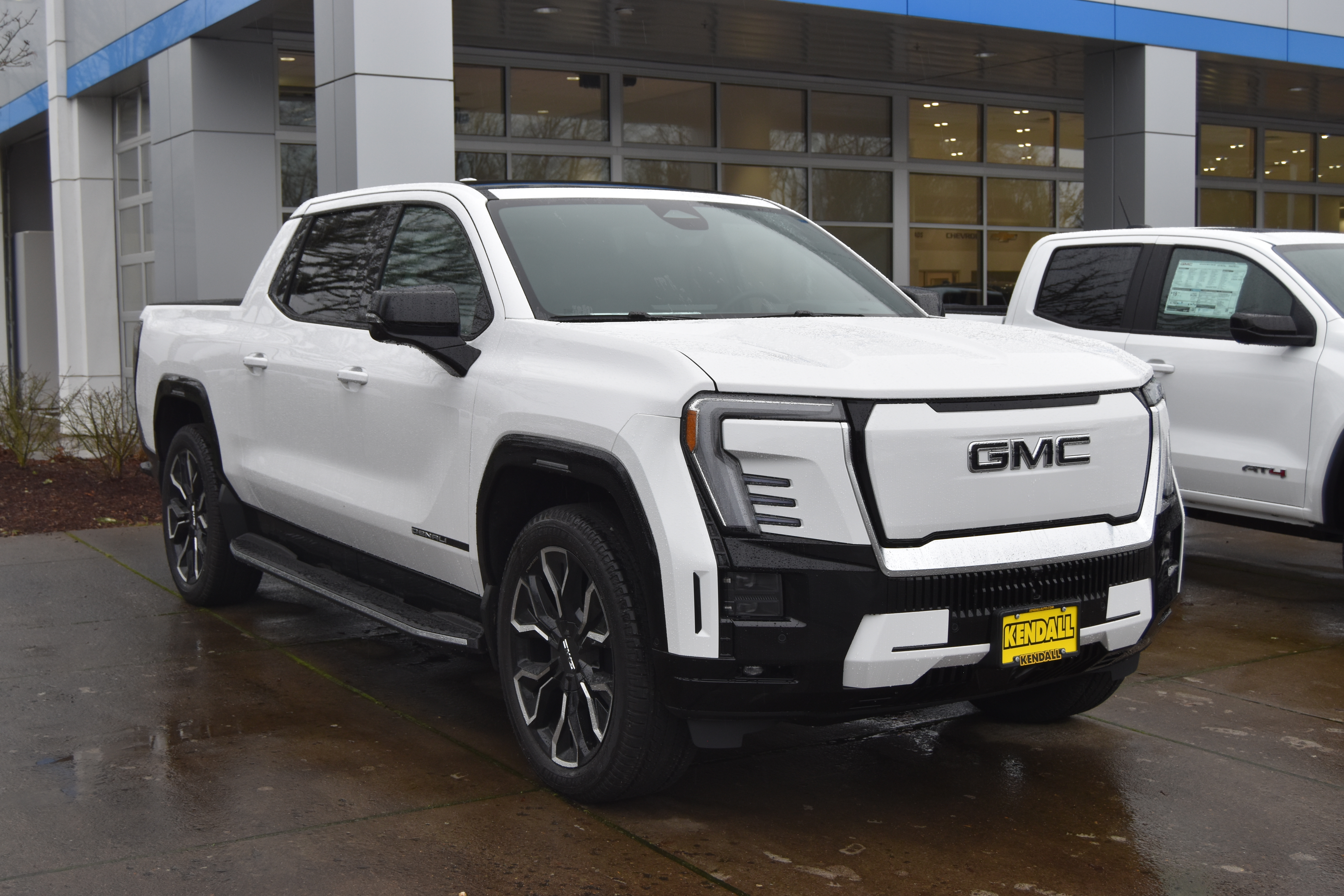
2024 GMC Sierra EV

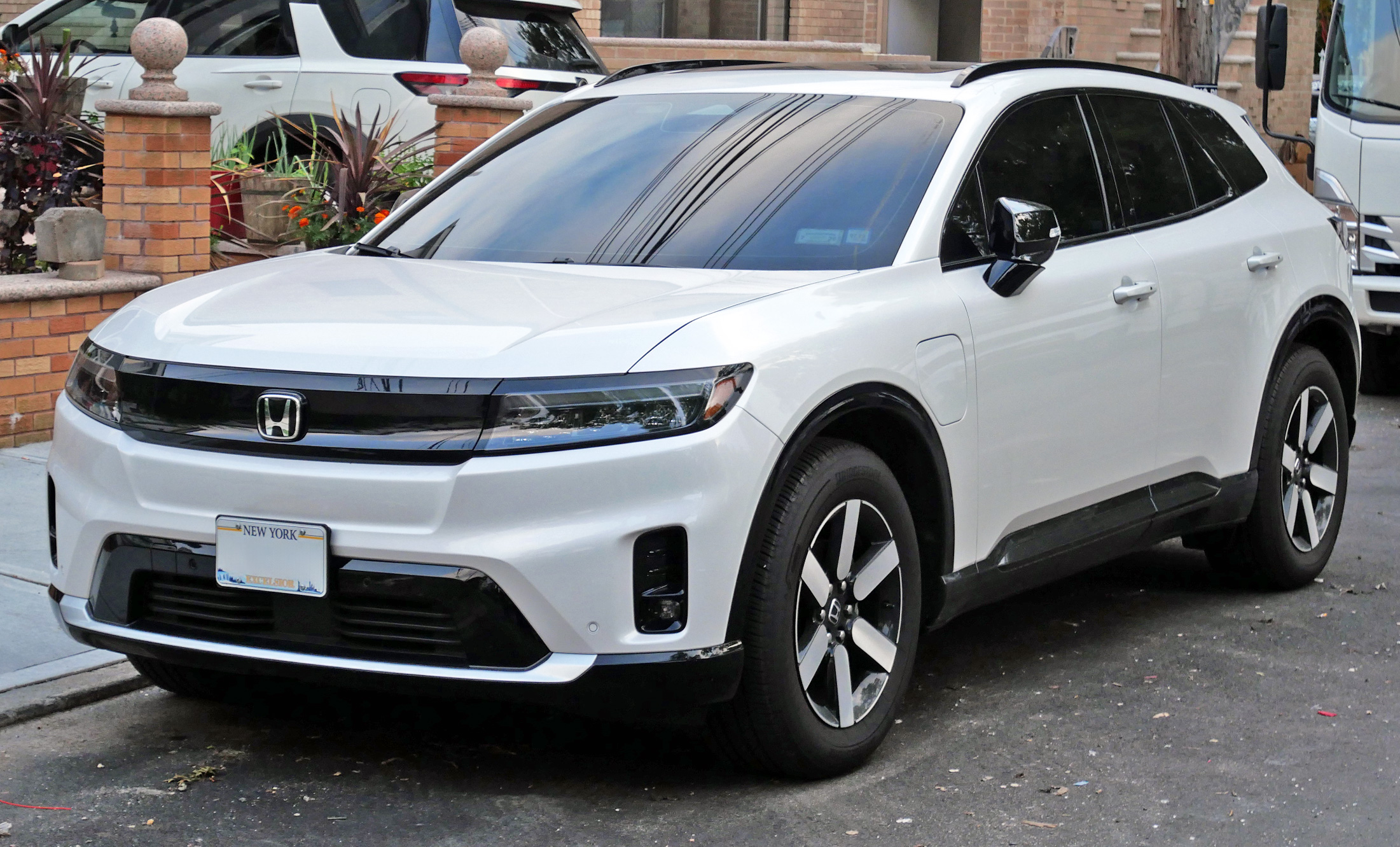
2024 Honda Prologue

== See also ==
- General Motors BEV3 platform
- General Motors BT1 platform
