= Cadillac Lyriq =

Battery electric mid-size luxury crossover SUV

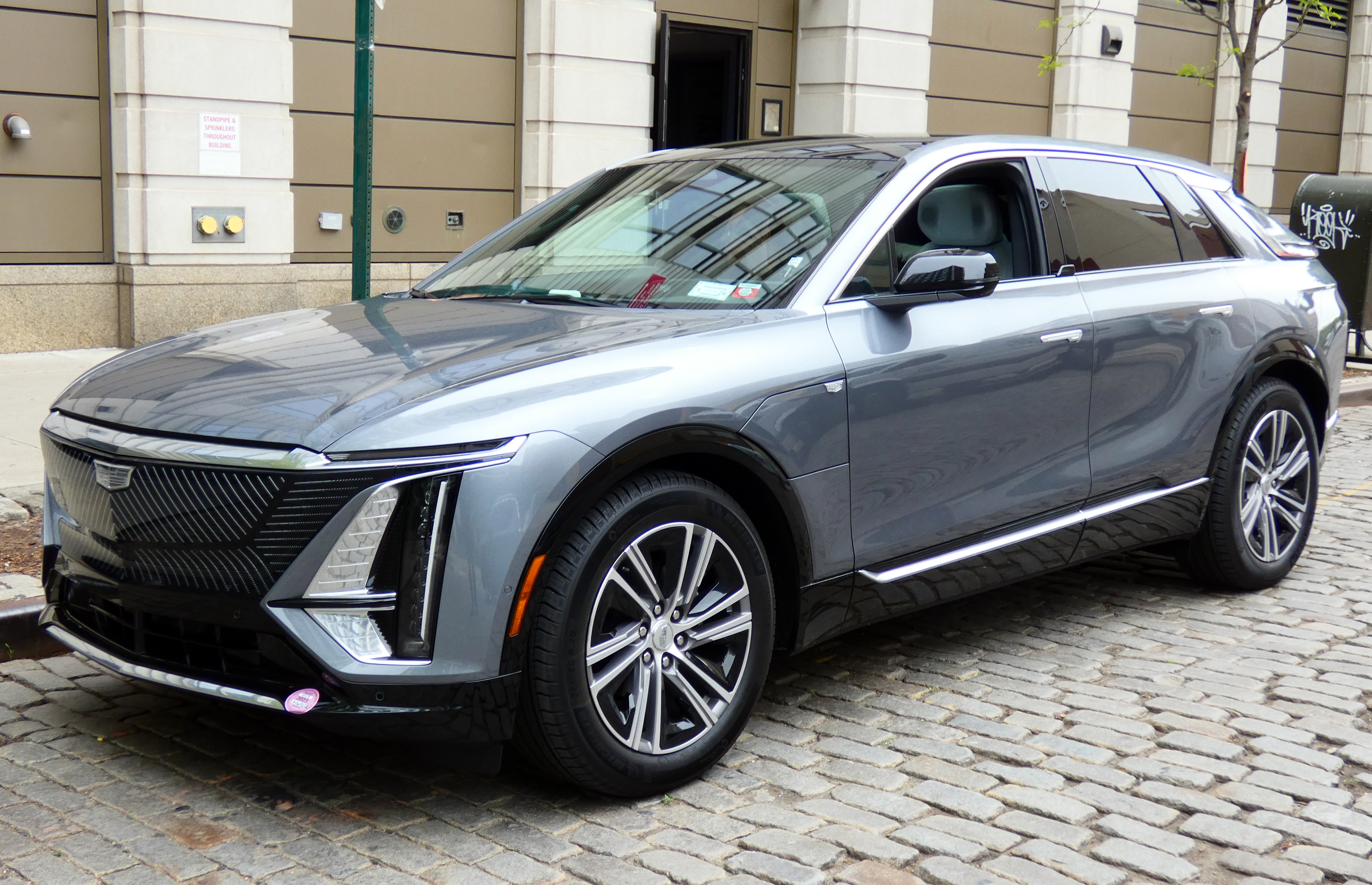

Overview
- Manufacturer: Cadillac (General Motors)
- Production: May 2022 – present; 2022–present (China)
- Model years: 2023–present
- Assembly: United States: Spring Hill, Tennessee (Spring Hill Manufacturing); China: Shanghai (SAIC-GM)
- Designer: Magalie Debellis

Body and chassis
- Class: Mid-size luxury crossover SUV
- Body style: 5-door SUV
- Layout: Rear-motor, rear-wheel drive; Dual-motor, all-wheel drive
- Platform: GM BEV3
- Related: Chevrolet Blazer EV; Honda Prologue; Acura ZDX (second generation)

Powertrain
- Electric motor: Permanent magnet synchronous AC
- Power output: 325–515 hp (242–384 kW; 330–522 PS); 615 hp (459 kW; 624 PS) (V)
- Battery: 95.7 kWh; 102.0 kWh Ultium NCMA LGES
- Electric range: 303–326 mi (488–525 km) (EPA); 285 mi (459 km) (V, EPA)
- Plug-in charging: 19.2 kW (AC); 190 kW (DC)

Dimensions
- Wheelbase: 121.8 in (3,094 mm)
- Length: 196.7 in (4,996 mm)
- Width: 77.8 in (1,976 mm)
- Height: 63.9 in (1,623 mm)
- Curb weight: 5,557–5,789 lb (2,521–2,626 kg)

The Cadillac Lyriq is a battery electric mid-size luxury crossover SUV manufactured and marketed by the Cadillac division of General Motors. As Cadillac's first fully electric vehicle, and the first GM production vehicle using the BEV3 platform, the Lyriq introduces a new version of GM's Super Cruise semi-autonomous driving system.

Assembled at Spring Hill Manufacturing in Spring Hill, Tennessee for North America and at a new EV-only plant in Yantai, China for Asia, Cadillac started accepting customer orders for the 2023 Lyriq in the United States in May 2022.

In late 2024, the Lyriq won the German "Car of the Year 2025" award in the luxury car category.

== History ==
At the 2019 North American International Auto Show, CEO Mary Barra presented several details about the group's upcoming series of EVs, which included a crossover from Cadillac. The name Lyriq follows a pattern of several prior Cadillac concept vehicles, including the Evoq, Provoq, and Celestiq, all ending in "q".

Cadillac originally planned for a US-market presentation of the Lyriq (as a "show car" or concept car) on April 2, 2020, followed by a launch soon thereafter for the 2021 model year. Due to the COVID-19 pandemic, it was postponed to August 6. Production of the Lyriq was also delayed to early 2022. Chinese and Asian market production at a new plant at Shanghai GM's Yantai complex built for Ultium will start slightly before Spring Hill starts Lyriq assembly for North America.

Following the public debut of the Lyriq show car at the 2021 Shanghai Auto Show, the production version was presented on April 21, 2021.

Batteries for both Yantai and Spring Hill production will be sourced from LG Chem, with Spring Hill initially getting pouch-type Ultium cells from an LG Chem plant in South Korea. This will be done until GM and LG Chem expand Spring Hill to accommodate Ultium battery production for both domestic use and exports to Mexico. According to Cadillac, all the interior components were newly designed for the Lyriq and no pre-existing GM parts were used.

== Markets ==
Production of the Lyriq for all markets is at the Spring Hill, Tennessee plant in the US, except for China, where it is produced locally.

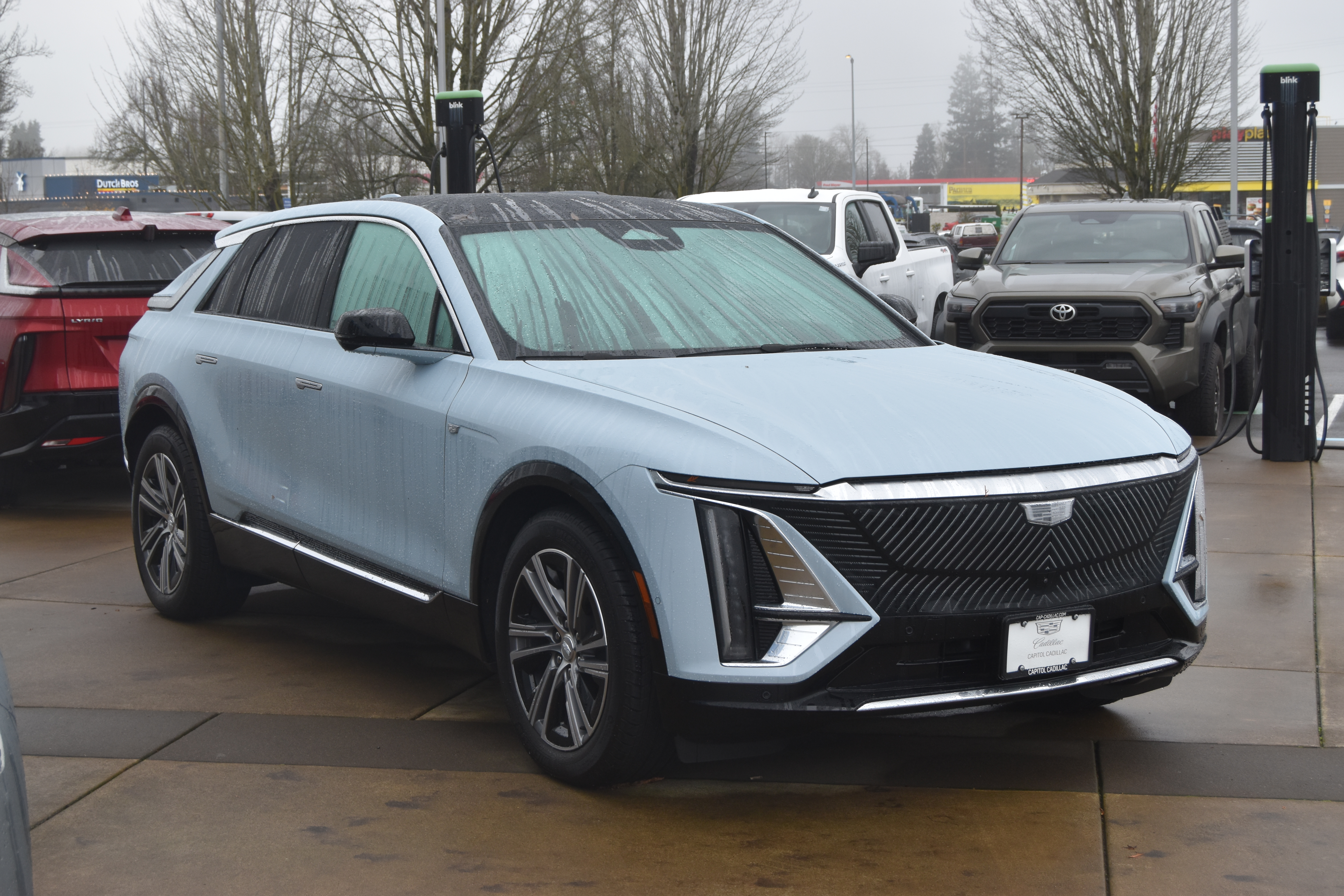
Sport & Luxury trims in Argent Silver & Nimbus Metallic

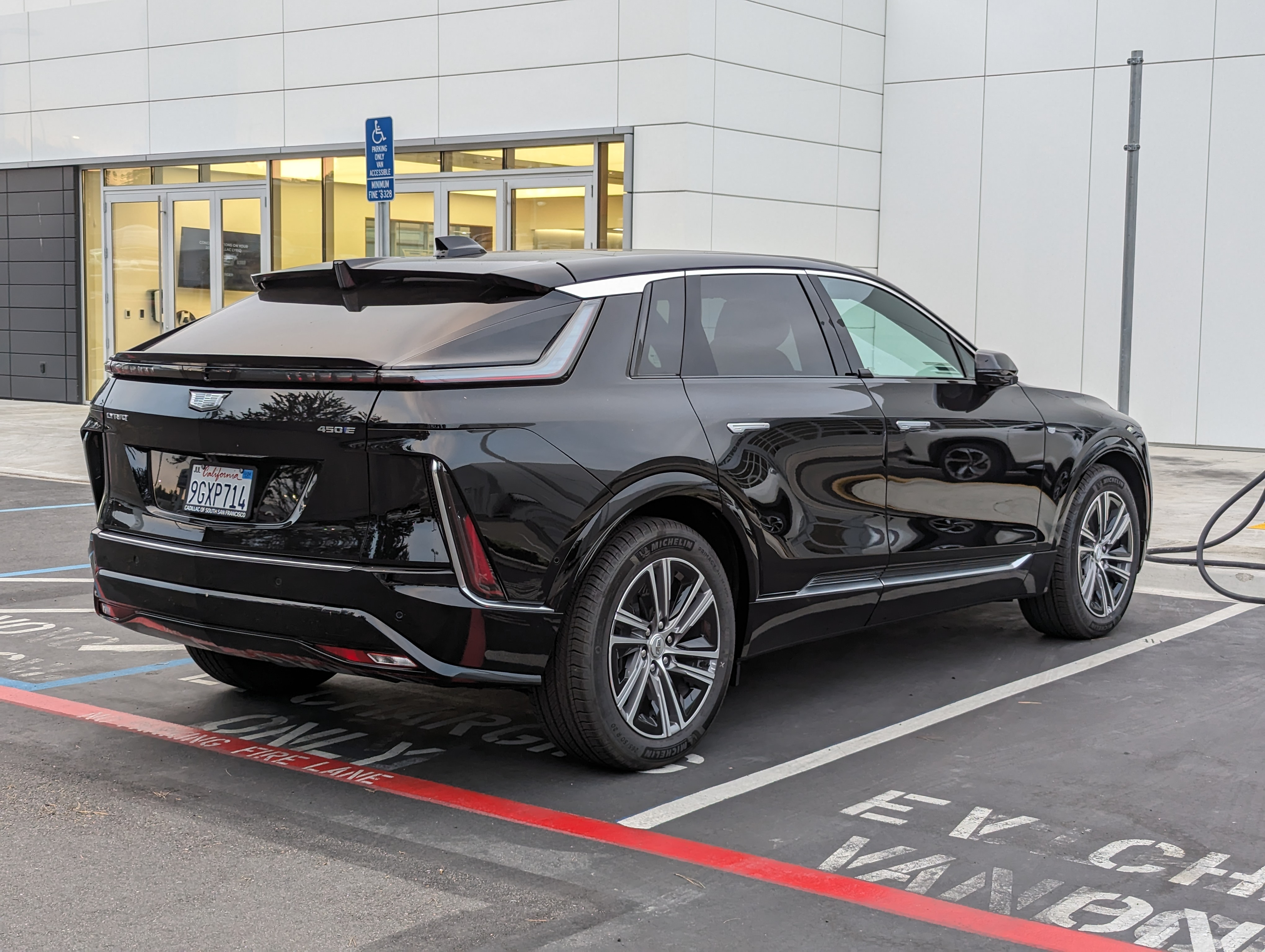
Rear view

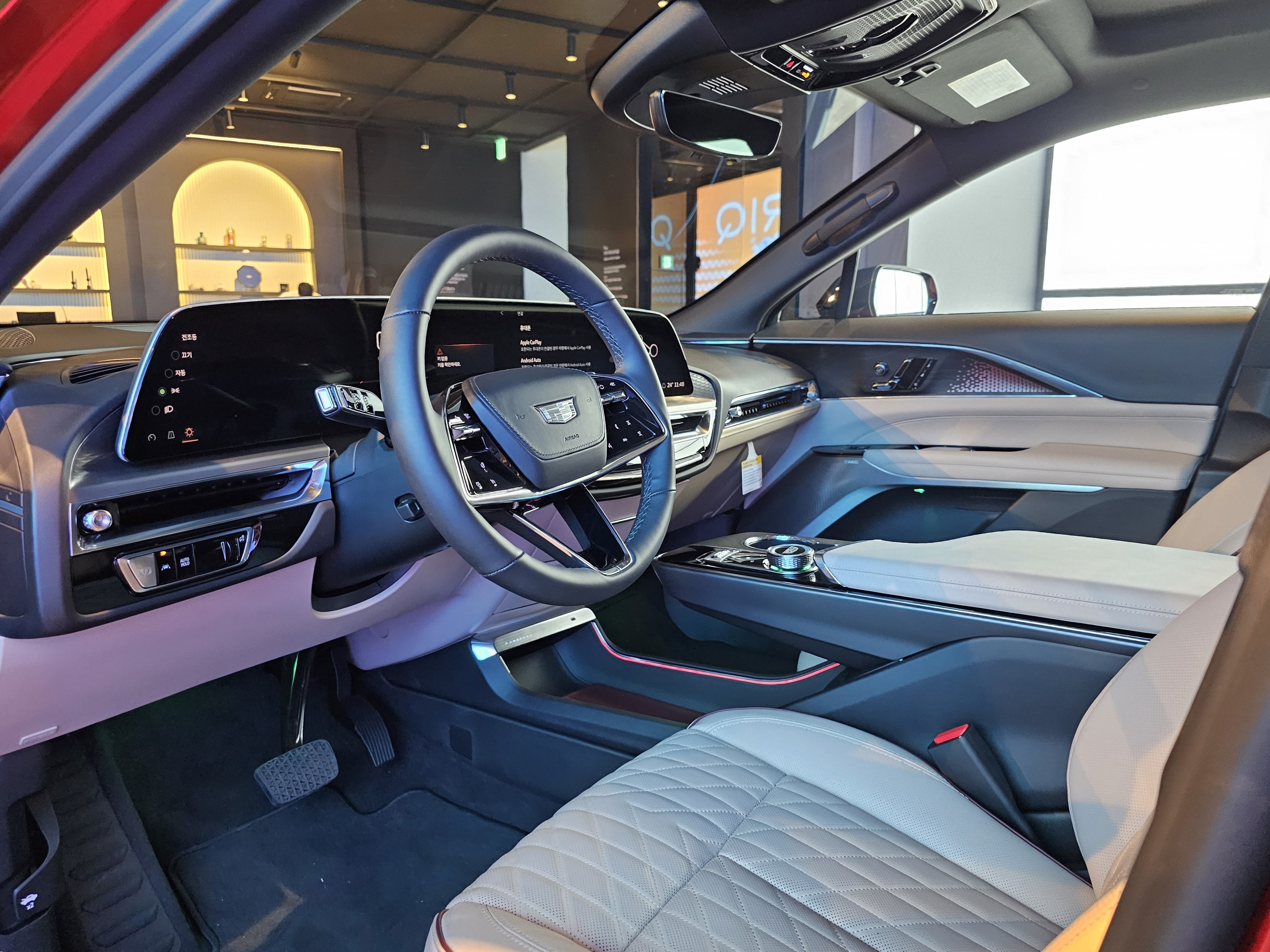
Interior first row

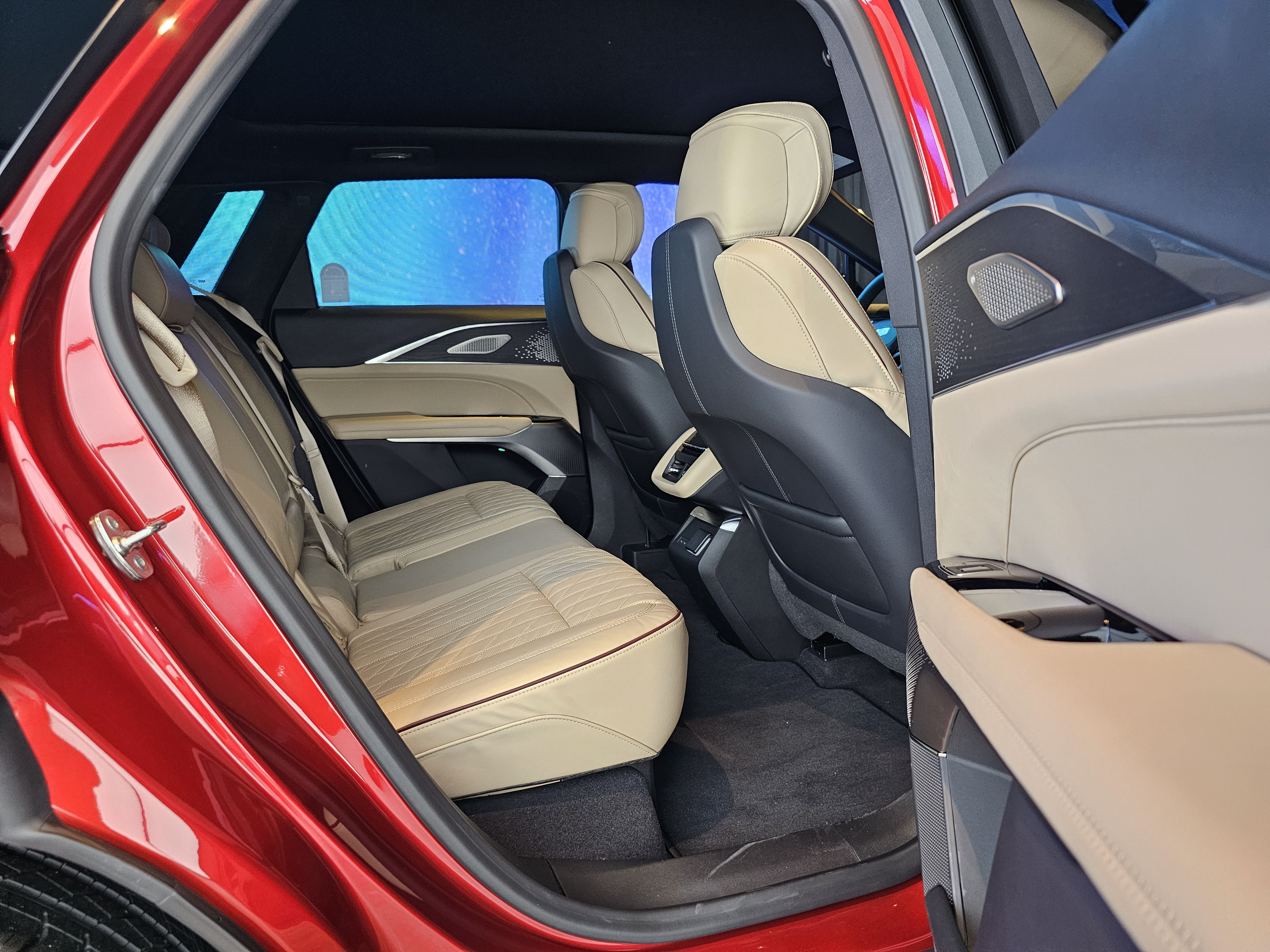
Interior second row

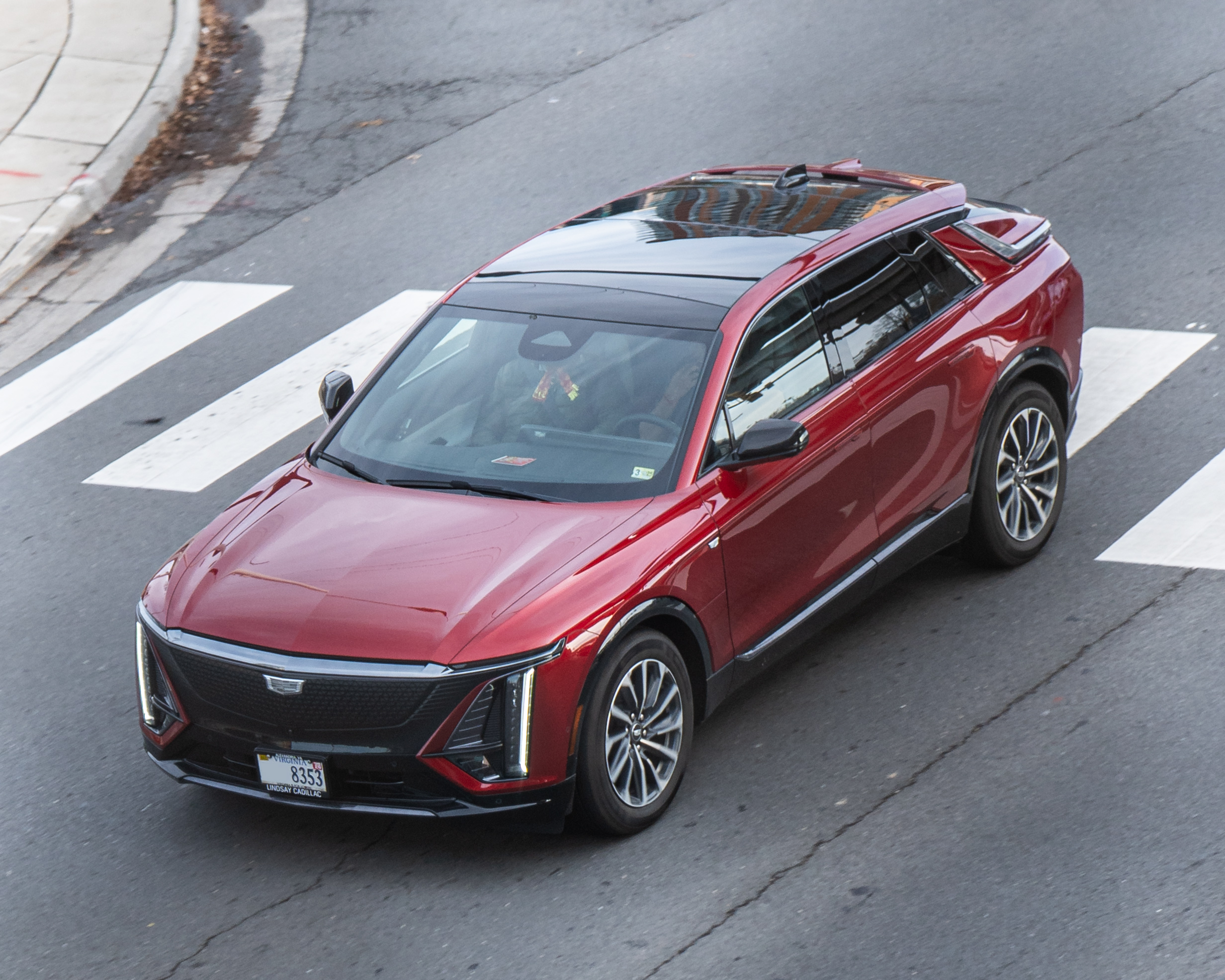
Cadillac Lyriq spotted in Washington DC

=== China ===
Pre-orders for the Lyriq (Chinese: IQ锐歌; pinyin: IQ ruì gē; lit. 'IQ sharp song') opened in China in November 2021 with over 5,000 pre-orders within half a month, with reservations opening in June 2022 and deliveries beginning in October that year, or December for the all-wheel drive model. It was initially offered with a 95.7 kWh battery pack but retained the same motor setup as other markets, allowing for CLTC range ratings of 653 km (406 mi) for rear-wheel drive and 600 km (373 mi) for all-wheel drive.

A new base version was introduced at Auto Guangzhou 2023 in November, equipped with fewer features and a single 335 hp (250 kW; 340 PS) motor with 440 lb⋅ft (600 N⋅m) of torque, allowing for a lower price. It has a CLTC range rating of 502 kilometres (312 mi).

The Lyriq-V was unveiled in China in March 2025 with sales to begin later in the year as a 2026. It will be produced locally, and is the first Cadillac V model to be sold in the country.

=== Europe ===
Cadillac Europe introduced the Lyriq with a direct-to-consumer sales model in Europe in 2024, first entering Switzerland, followed by Sweden, France and Germany. It is available exclusively with the all-wheel drive powertrain rated at 528 hp (394 kW; 535 PS).

=== Japan ===
A right-hand drive version of the Lyriq was unveiled in Japan in December 2024, with sales expected to begin in the second quarter of 2025. Pre-orders started in March 2025 with deliveries to be made in May 2025. It will be built at the Spring Hill, Tennessee manufacturing plant.

In April 2025, Cadillac Japan launched an exhibition tour of the Lyriq.

=== North America ===
The Lyriq was first delivered to American dealerships in the highest demand markets of New York, Los Angeles, and Detroit in the first week of July 2022. GM delivered a total of 122 Lyriqs to U.S. customers in 2022.

For the 2024 model year, EPA range estimates for the dual motor models increased from 312 miles (502 km) to 314 miles (505 km). Additionally, a new $1200 optional OTA update for dual motor models, called the Velocity Package, increases the torque output and allows for a reduction in 0–60 mph (0–97 km/h) times from 4.7 to 4.4 seconds. A more conventional door access system was implemented, with remote activated flush pop-out handles replacing an electronic unlatch button which lacked discrete handles.

For the 2025 model year, the base Tech trim level was dropped, and the model is produced with 24% fewer parts. Additionally, it receives an increase in power output to 365 hp (272 kW; 370 PS) for rear-wheel drive and 515 hp (384 kW; 522 PS) for all-wheel drive, with torque numbers maintained. Range increases to 326 miles (525 km) for rear-wheel drive models, and 303 or 319 miles (488 or 513 km) for all-wheel drive models depending on the trim level.

In January 2025, Cadillac introduced the Lyriq-V, joining the "V-Series" of high-performance models. It is expected to launch later in 2025 as a 2026 model.

=== Oceania ===
The Lyriq was introduced to Australia and New Zealand in October 2024 with right-hand drive. It is available exclusively with the all-wheel drive powertrain, and the 102 kWh battery providing 530 kilometres (329 mi) of range on the WLTP cycle. It is produced at the Spring Hill, Tennessee manufacturing plant.

=== South Korea ===
The Lyriq began sales in South Korea in July 2024, available with all-wheel drive and 465 kilometres (289 mi) of range from the 102 kWh battery pack.

== Specifications ==
=== Powertrain ===
At debut, the Cadillac Lyriq was offered with a single motor driving the rear wheels, while dual motor all-wheel drive models became available for the 2024 model year. In both configurations, synchronous AC motors with permanent magnets and bar wound stator is used. The single motor generates 340 hp (254 kW; 345 PS) and 325 lb⋅ft (441 N⋅m; 45 kg⋅m) torque, while the all-wheel drive, dual motor version adds an additional motor to the front axle and has an estimated combined output of 500 hp (373 kW; 507 PS) and 450 lb⋅ft (610 N⋅m), increasing to 524 lb⋅ft (710 N⋅m) with the Velocity Package.

The motors draw from a 102 kWh gross capacity (100 kWh usable capacity) Ultium battery with an EPA estimated 314 miles (505 km) range for the single motor, and 307 miles (494 km) for dual motor models. The single motor drivetrain achieves a combined 89 mpg‑e (38 kW⋅h/100 mi) under EPA testing, while the dual motor is rated at 88 mpg‑e (38 kW⋅h/100 mi). Real-world range and energy consumption can vary depending on the selected driving mode.

The vehicle supports 19.2 kW Level 2 AC charging and DC fast charging at up to 190 kW.

=== Chassis ===
The Lyriq was the first vehicle built upon GM's third generation BEV platform called BEV3. It is a unibody chassis with a skateboard style powertrain, where the battery is a flat shape that sits underneath the floor of the vehicle. All models have five-link multilink suspension paired with passively frequency sensitive hydraulic dampers on both the front and rear axles. In addition to regenerative braking, the vehicle is equipped with 17 in (430 mm) brake rotors on the front wheels, and 18 in (460 mm) rotors on the rear wheels. Run-flat all-season tires fitted to 20 inch wheels are standard on all trims, with 22 inch wheels optional. All-wheel drive models have a 3,500 lb (1,600 kg) towing capacity, while rear wheel drive models have no tow rating.

=== Drive Modes ===
The Lyriq offers multiple driving modes, accessed through the Driver Mode Control app on the touchscreen. Tour is the default mode, set up for everyday driving. Sport mode increases steering effort and makes the accelerator more responsive. Snow/Ice mode adjusts the AWD system to get maximum traction on icy roads.

My Mode lets the driver personalize individual settings, including acceleration feel, suspension, and motor sound. The Lyriq-V has an additional mode "Velocity Max", which is selected separately from the other modes and gives access to the model's peak power output for short bursts of acceleration

=== Lyriq-V ===
The Lyriq-V increases the power of the dual-motor, all-wheel drive Lyriq, with a peak output of 615 hp (459 kW; 624 PS) and 650 lb⋅ft (881 N⋅m) of torque. This output can only be achieved in a driver-selected "Velocity Max" mode, which Cadillac claims can accelerate the Lyriq to 60 mph in 3.3 seconds. The Lyriq-V adds a "V-Mode" control to customize performance settings and sound output. It uses the same 102 kWh battery as the dual-motor Lyriq, with a slightly decreased range of 285 miles (459 km) estimated. The suspension is lowered with standard continuous damping control, and the steering ratio is changed for a quicker response.

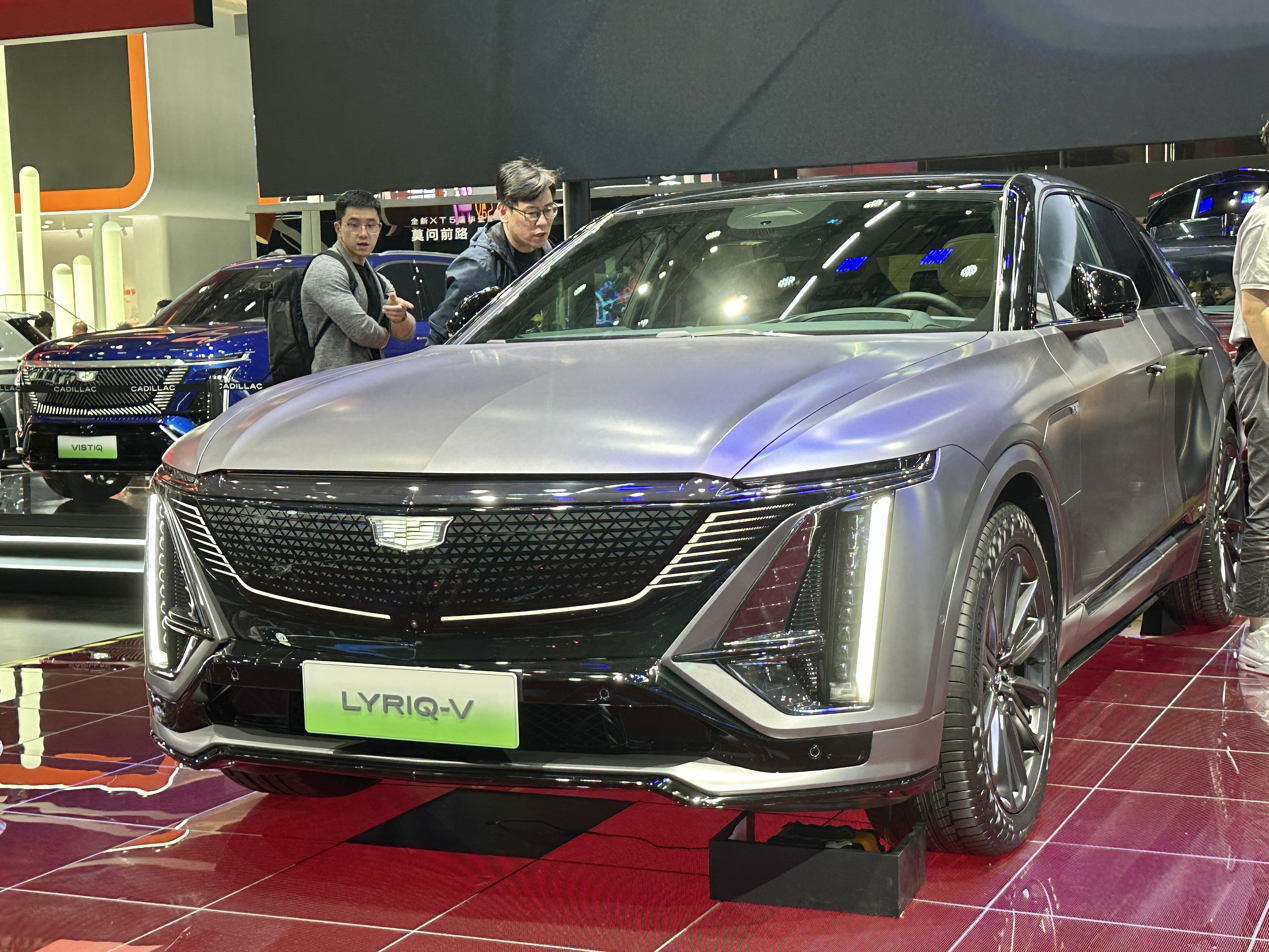
Cadillac Lyriq-V

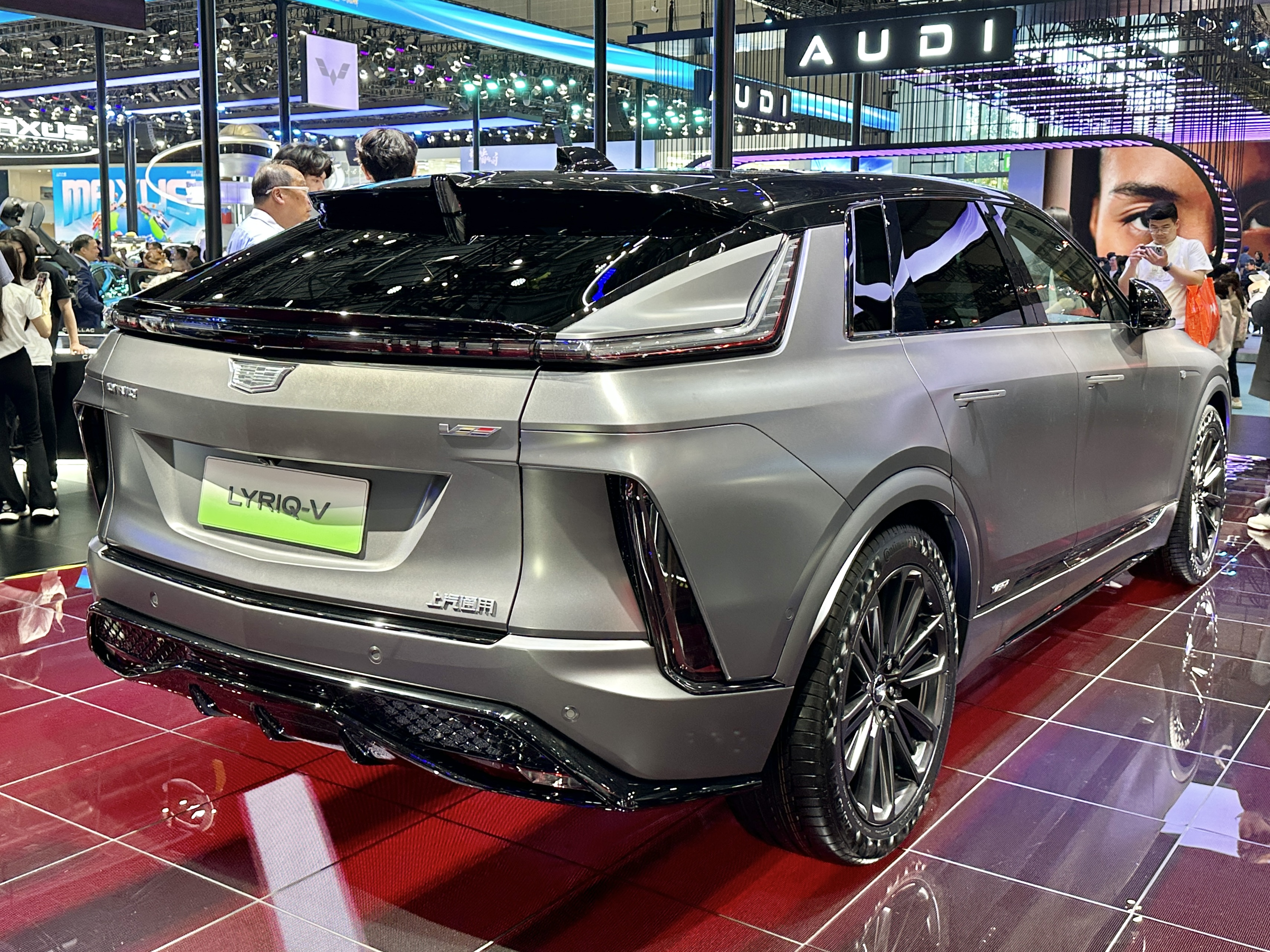
Rear view

== Safety ==
=== IIHS ===
IIHS scores (2024 model year)
Small overlap front	Good
Moderate overlap front (updated test)	Good
Side (updated test)	Good
Headlights	Poor
Front crash prevention: vehicle-to-vehicle 2.0	Good
Front crash prevention: vehicle-to-pedestrian	Acceptable
Seatbelt reminders	Good
Child seat anchors (LATCH) ease of use	Good

== Sales ==
In 2024, the Lyriq became the best-selling luxury midsize electric SUV in the United States.

Cadillac Lyriq sales numbers
Calendar year	US	Canada	China
2022	122	—	2,358
2023	9,154	917	2,945
2024	28,402	3,556	1,394
2025	20,971	2,237	1,225
