= Honda Prologue =

Battery electric mid-size crossover SUV

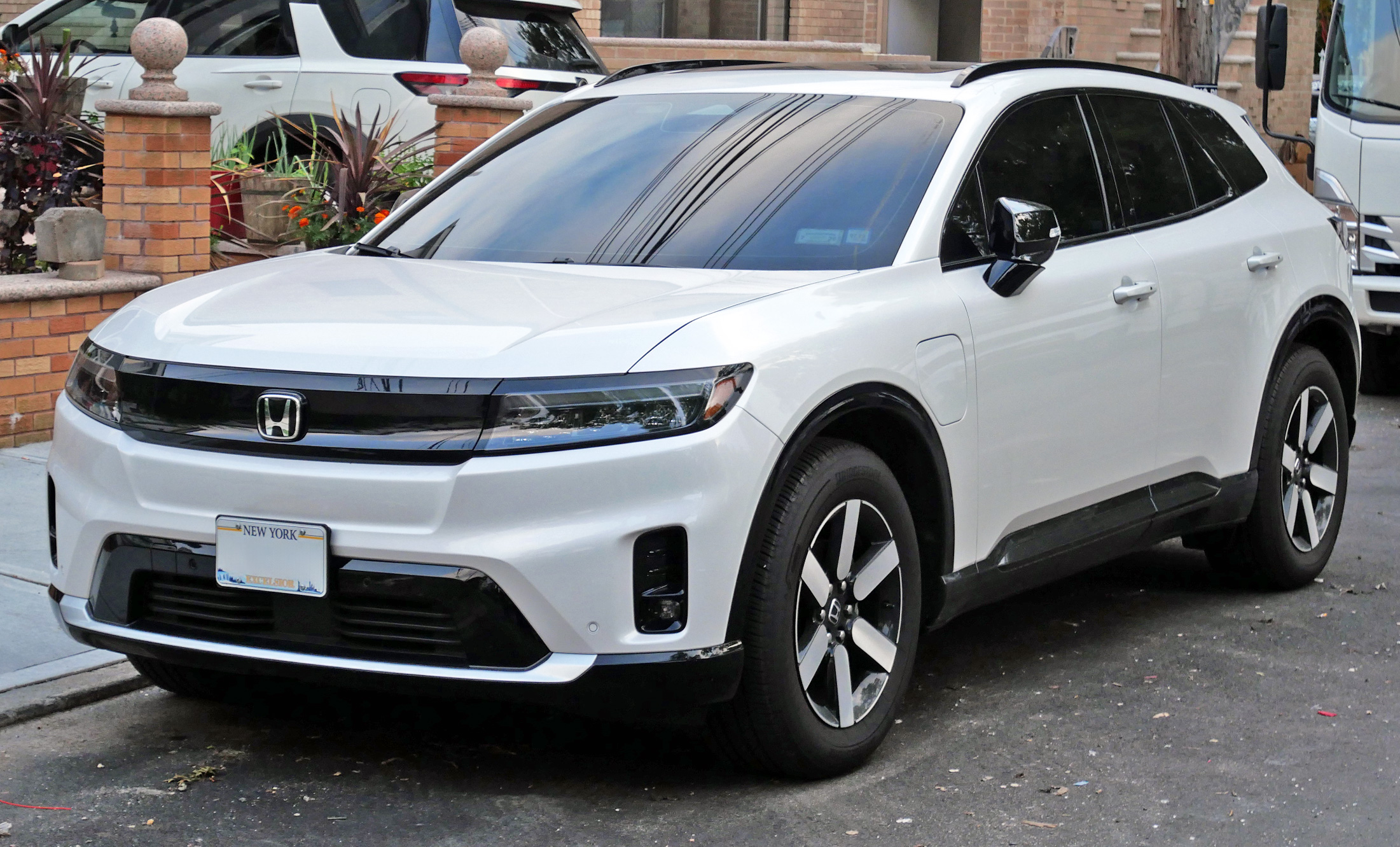

Overview
- Manufacturer: Honda; General Motors
- Production: January 2024 – present
- Model years: 2024–present
- Assembly: Mexico: Ramos Arizpe, Coahuila (Ramos Arizpe Assembly)
- Designer: John Hwang

Body and chassis
- Class: Mid-size crossover SUV
- Body style: 5-door SUV
- Layout: Front-motor, front-wheel-drive; Dual-motor, all-wheel-drive
- Platform: GM BEV3
- Related: Chevrolet Blazer EV; Cadillac Lyriq; Acura ZDX (second generation)

Powertrain
- Electric motor: Permanent magnet synchronous AC; Induction AC
- Power output: Single motor: 218 hp (163 kW); Dual motor: 288 hp (215 kW)
- Transmission: Single-speed reduction gear
- Battery: 85.0 kWh Ultium lithium-ion
- Electric range: 296 mi (476 km) (FWD); 273–281 mi (439–452 km) (AWD)
- Plug-in charging: 11.5 kW (AC); 155 kW (DC)

Dimensions
- Wheelbase: 121.8 in (3,094 mm)
- Length: 192.0 in (4,877 mm)
- Width: 78.3 in (1,989 mm)
- Height: 64.7 in (1,643 mm)

The Honda Prologue is a battery electric mid-size crossover SUV jointly developed by Honda and General Motors and marketed in North America by Honda. Announced in October 2022 with sales starting in March 2024, it is Honda's first major electric vehicle following a number of low volume battery electric vehicles previously sold by Honda in North America, including the Honda Clarity, Honda Fit, and the experimental Honda EV Plus. Based heavily on the Chevrolet Blazer EV, the Prologue is comparable in size with the ICE-powered Passport. The Prologue will be discontinued after the 2026 model year. Honda did not provide a reason, but sources speculated that decreased sales after the removal of the federal EV tax credit and increased tariffs were both factors in the decision.

== Development and design ==
Styled by Honda Design Studio in Los Angeles, the Prologue is based on the Ultium architecture and the BEV3 platform developed by General Motors, which it shares with the Chevrolet Blazer EV, Acura ZDX, and Cadillac Lyriq.

Production of the Prologue at GM's Ramos Arizpe plant started in January 2024, with initial customer deliveries expected in March. Through November 2024, sales of the Prologue in the United States totaled 25,132. Production is expected to end in December 2026.

Development of the Prologue was led by chief engineer John Hwang. According to Hwang, the frame rails, the floor, the front and rear suspension subframes, pedal box, steering column mounting, the base of the windshield, and firewall are shared with the Blazer EV. Honda designers and engineers are given freedom to develop its own sheetmetal, and tuned the steering calibration, springs and dampers independently from the Blazer EV. While having a unique interior design, the Prologue shares many components with the Blazer EV, including the steering wheel and stalks, climate settings controls, door handles and locks, and window switches.

A dashboard mounted 11-inch screen serves as the digital instrument cluster, with a free standing 11.3-inch touchscreen used as an infotainment display. It runs a reskinned version of GM's Android Automotive implementation known as Google Built-in, but in contrast to GM's version, supports wireless Android Auto and Apple CarPlay. Google services such as Assistant and Play are integrated on all models. Google Maps can be used on either display, and provides route planning that accommodates for charging stops and can automatically initiate battery preconditioning to reduce charging times.

The drive mode shifter is column mounted, allowing for more space in the center console, which features two side-by-side cupholders behind a flat storage tray, and a pocket style vertical wireless phone charger. Two 3-amp USB-C charging ports that output up to 45W located in each row, along with heated front seats and dual-zone climate control are standard on all models.

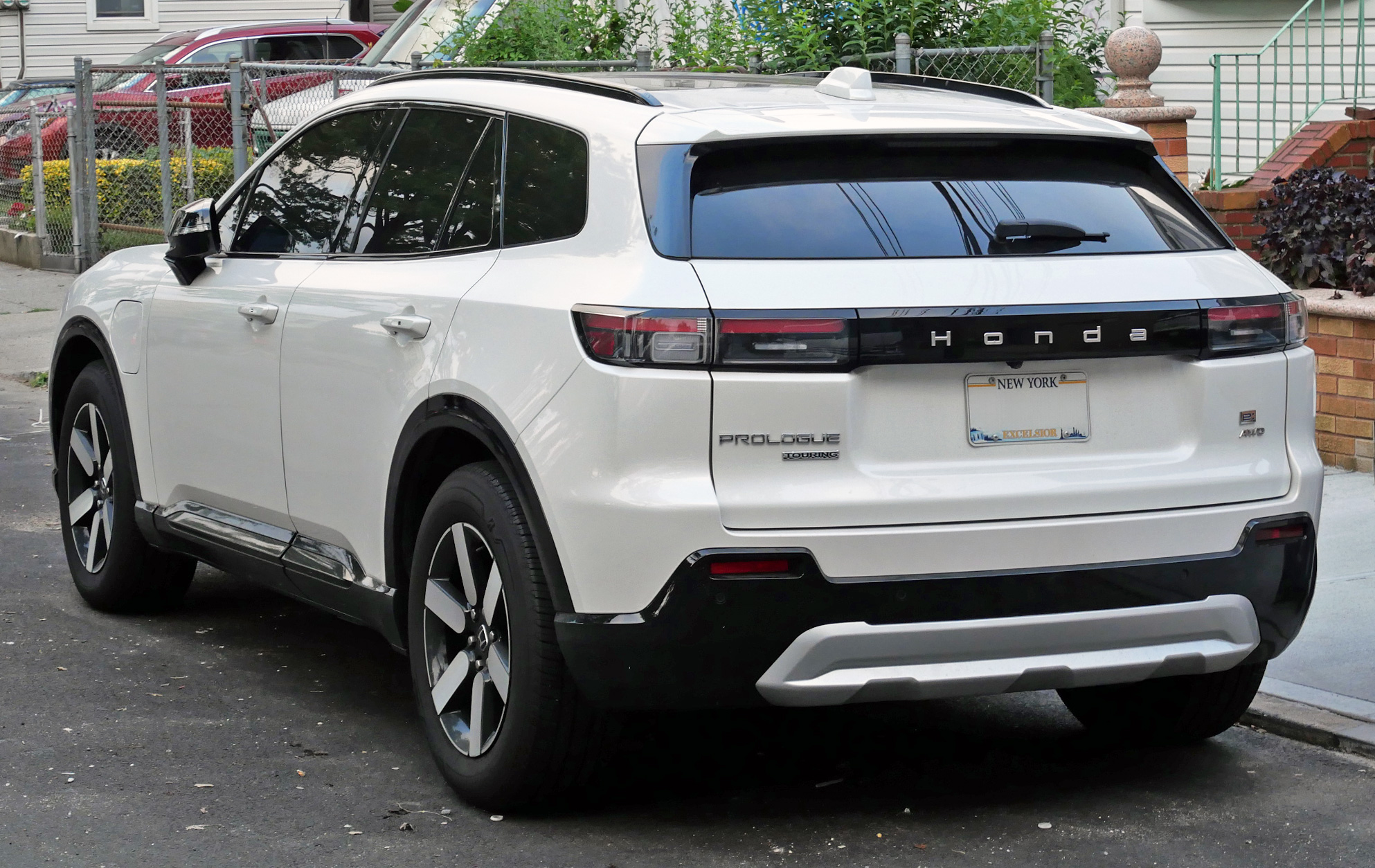
Rear view

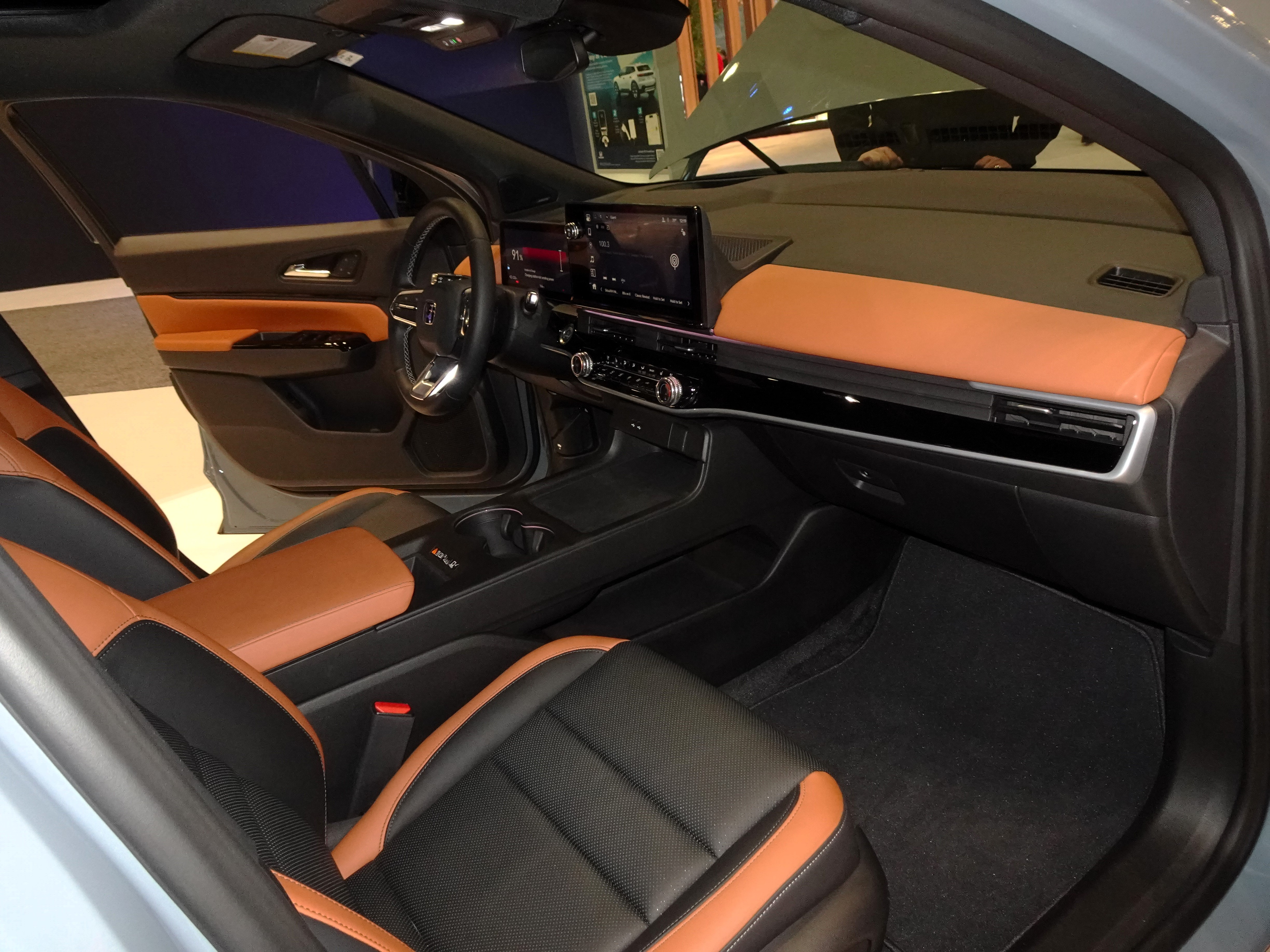
Interior

== Trim levels ==
In the US market, the Prologue comes in three trims: EX, Touring, and Elite. EX is available in both front and all-wheel drive, and has black or light gray cloth seating surfaces with a 10-way power driver's seat, and comes with 19-inch wheels. The Touring trim adds black or light gray leather seating, memory positioning for the driver's seat, a leather-wrapped steering wheel, 12-speaker Bose audio system, front and rear parking sensors, and an auto-dimming rearview mirror. The all-wheel drive only Elite trim comes with black, light grey or brown perforated leather seats that have ventilation for the front row, a heated steering wheel, a head-up display, and 21-inch wheels with run-flat tires, the biggest ever fitted on a Honda.

== Powertrain ==
The Prologue is offered in either single-motor front-wheel drive or dual-motor all-wheel drive configurations. The front is powered by a permanent magnet synchronous AC motor that makes 212 hp (158 kW; 215 PS) and 236 lb⋅ft (320 N⋅m) of torque. All-wheel drive models also have a permanent magnet AC motor that makes 241 hp (180 kW; 244 PS) and 225 lb⋅ft (305 N⋅m) of torque and an induction AC motor for the rear axle that makes 90 hp (67 kW; 91 PS) and 121 lb⋅ft (164 N⋅m) of torque, combining to make 288 hp (215 kW; 292 PS) and 333 lb⋅ft (451 N⋅m) of torque.

The motors draw from a 85 kWh liquid-cooled lithium-ion Ultium battery with an EPA estimated 296 mi (476 km) for front-wheel drive, and 273 mi (439 km) for all-wheel drive models. The Prologue is equipped with a 11.5 kW onboard AC charger, and is capable of up to 155 kW peak during DC fast charging.

== Sales ==
Year	U.S.	Canada
2024	33,017	532
2025	39,194	1,063
2026 (Jan-Oct)	14,530	469
