= General Motors BEV2 platform =

Electric vehicle platform

GM BEV2 platform
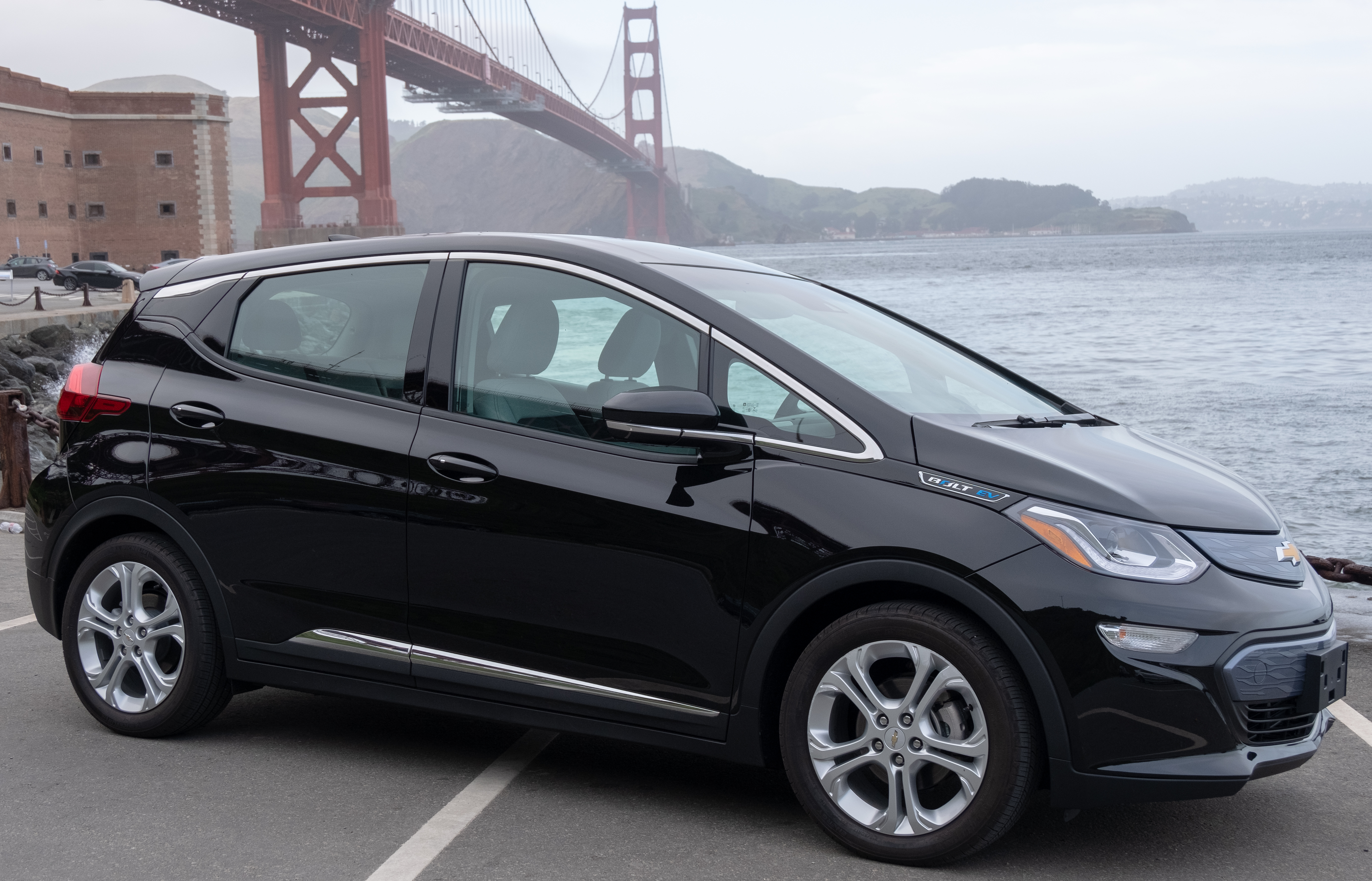
- Chevrolet Bolt, an example of a vehicle based on the BEV2 platform

Overview
- Manufacturer: General Motors
- Also called: BEVII; Battery Electric Vehicle II
- Production: 2016–present

Body and chassis
- Layout: Front-motor, front-wheel drive
- Related: GM Gamma

Powertrain
- Transmission: Single speed

Chronology
- Predecessor: General Motors EV1
- Successor: GM BEV3

The GM BEV2 platform is an automotive platform made by General Motors designed specifically for small electric vehicles. Multiple divisions of the LG Corporation have been instrumental in construction in addition to GM's contributions to the platform.

== Chronology ==
=== 1996–2003: EV1 ===
Despite having a "2" in its name, which usually indicates a second generation of a platform in GM nomenclature, BEV2 had no direct predecessor. The concept of "BEV1" actually refers to the General Motors EV1. However, the EV1 and vehicles on BEV2 differ greatly, in part due to the two-decade gap between them.

=== 2010–2015: Gamma derivatives ===
In 2011, GM announced that they had finished development of an EV supplier base in China. This coincided with the introduction of the Springo, an EV based on the Gamma platform's Chevrolet Sail. Two years later in 2013, a similar EV variant was released of the Sail's American-market equivalent, the Spark. This Spark EV was sold until 2016, the same year as the introduction of the Bolt, and, though GM openly stated that the Bolt's platform was not derived from Gamma, the Bolt's model codes began with G2, suggesting influence of these vehicles upon it.

=== 2016: Chevrolet Bolt ===
In 2016, Chevrolet unveiled a production version of the Bolt, the first vehicle on BEV2, and the first dedicated EV from GM in 20 years. LG Chem and other LG divisions reportedly develop and install most of the components that make it an electric vehicle, per an agreement for the model. This vehicle is the first to be underpinned by BEV2 and also the strongest-selling, with over 16,000 sold at the end of 2018.

=== 2017–2023 ===
On October 2, 2017, GM announced a plan to introduce two new main EV models in the next eighteen months, followed by an additional eighteen electric models by 2023. The next month GM extended their commitment, aiming for a production volume of one million electric vehicles by 2026. On November 15, 2017, further clarification was made by GM CEO Mary Barra as to what the next five years of electric models would be:

- "Expressive luxury low-roof" vehicle (possibly a grand tourer)
- 5-passenger luxury SUV
- 5-passenger compact SUV
- "Shared" autonomous vehicle
- Functional light commercial vehicle
- "Efficient low-roof" car
- Small SUV
- Compact CUV
- 7-passenger large SUV
- 7-passenger luxury SUV

None of these promised actions, however, have been enacted in full. In China, the SAIC-GM joint venture has announced and launched the Buick Velite 6 (2019), also available with a PHEV drivetrain, and the closely related Chevrolet Menlo (2020). Since the end of the eighteen-month period, the Velite 6 and Menlo are the only main brand EVs that GM has produced, and both are limited to the Chinese market. Much of the incentive to market EVs in China can be explained by the zero-emission vehicles (ZEV) mandate that country's government has put in place, requiring manufacturers to have 8% percent of their volume be ZEVs in 2012, and 12% in 2020. The Velite 6/Menlo have a different wheelbase and motor than the Bolt EV and do not use the BEV2 platform.

In March 2019, GM announced its intentions to build another BEV2 platform-based vehicle very similar to the Bolt at Orion Assembly; the new BEV2 vehicle was developed alongside the GMC Hummer EV. The vehicle was launched first in 2020 as the Buick Velite 7 for the Chinese market. This crossover had been mentioned in the 2017 GM announcement, but it was later removed. A variant with revised styling for the United States was marketed as the Bolt EUV (electric utility vehicle), which is built on BEV2 and was launched in spring 2021.

Production of the Bolt and Bolt EUV were stopped in August 2021 due to a battery recall; production did not resume until April 2022.

=== 2023: Plans for discontinuation ===
GM began publicizing its Ultium battery technology and BEV3 platform in 2019 and 2020. Although both a refreshed Bolt EV and new Bolt EUV were announced at the same time, to go on sale in late 2020 and summer 2021, respectively, the Bolt EV and EUV did not move to Ultium/BEV3. The newer platform is intended to support a wide variety of battery electric vehicles, including the Cruise Origin, which was intended to be the first GM vehicle on Ultium/BEV3. On April 25, 2023, GM CEO Mary Barra stated that the BEV2-based Bolt and Bolt EUV would be discontinued at the end of 2023 to make room for GM's "new generation of electric vehicles," and a new Ultium/BEV3 Bolt was announced a few months later.

=== 2025: Reinstatement ===
In July 2025 GM Authority reported that the 2027 model year Bolt will not be a clean-slate redesign and will instead rely on the BEV2 platform.

== Design ==
BEV2 is derived from the Gamma 2 platform, used for other GM vehicles including the Chevrolet Sonic and Spark, but after significant changes were made during the development of the Bolt EV, GM gave it a unique platform designation. The Bolt was designed starting from 2012 by a team of 180 people in the studio of GM Korea (formerly Daewoo Korea), as a B-segment size vehicle in partnership with LG Chem. GM were responsible for the electric traction motor, battery control system, integration of the powertrain, and system validation. LG Chem designed and engineered the traction battery; other LG units provided vehicle electronics, including the infotainment module.

BEV2 features a skateboard-like chassis where the traction battery is carried between the wheels and under the seats. As initially fitted to the 2017 model year Bolt EV, the traction battery weighs 960 lb (440 kg) and has a storage capacity of 60 kW-hr. It supplies a traction motor driving the front wheels with an output of 150 kW (200 hp) and 361 N⋅m (266 lb⋅ft). The car's on-board charger accepts AC power at a maximum rate of 7.2 kW, and a CCS DC charging port is optional, accepting DC power at a maximum rate of 50 kW. LG Chem shifted production of the traction battery from Korea to Michigan for the 2020 model year Bolt, which advertised a capacity increase to 66 kW-hr.

== Applications ==
- 2017–2023, Chevrolet Bolt, B-segment hatchback
- 2020–2022 Buick Velite 7, B-segment crossover SUV
- 2021–2023 Chevrolet Bolt EUV, B-segment crossover SUV

=== Badge engineering ===
From its inception until 2020 (shortly after GM's sale of Opel/Vauxhall to Groupe PSA), the Chevrolet Bolt was sold in Europe as the Opel Ampera-e.

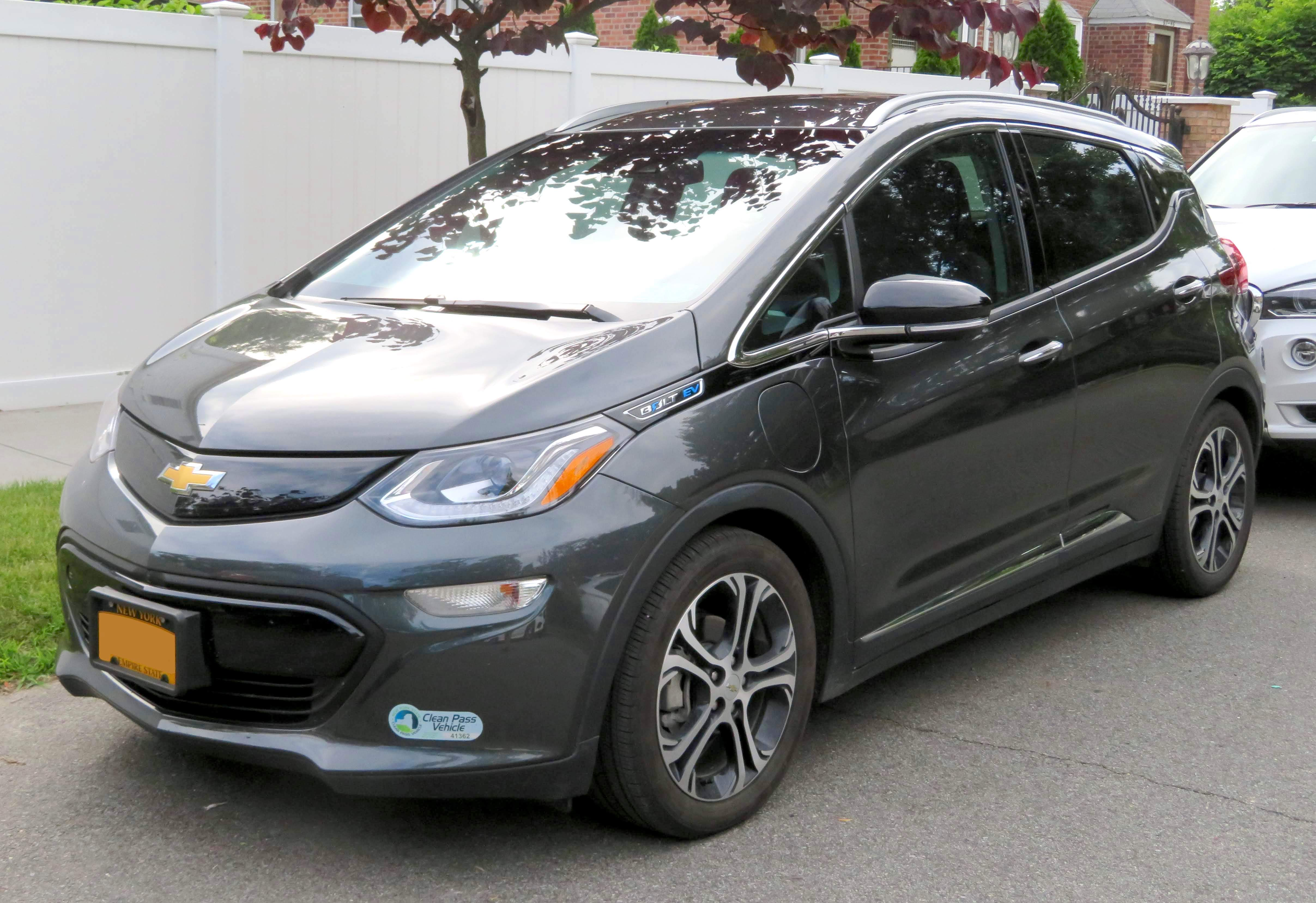
2017 Chevrolet Bolt

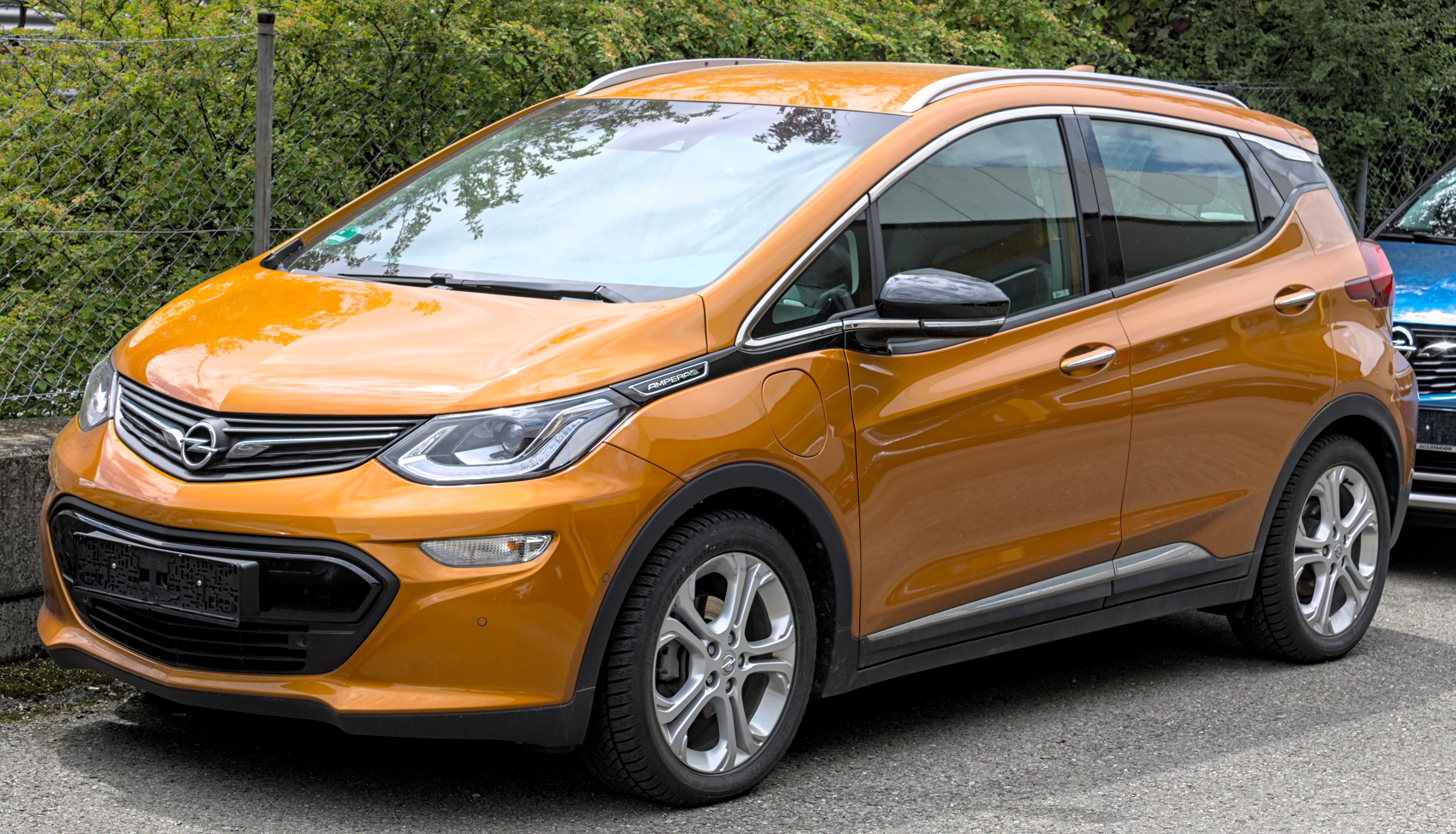
2017 Opel Ampera-e

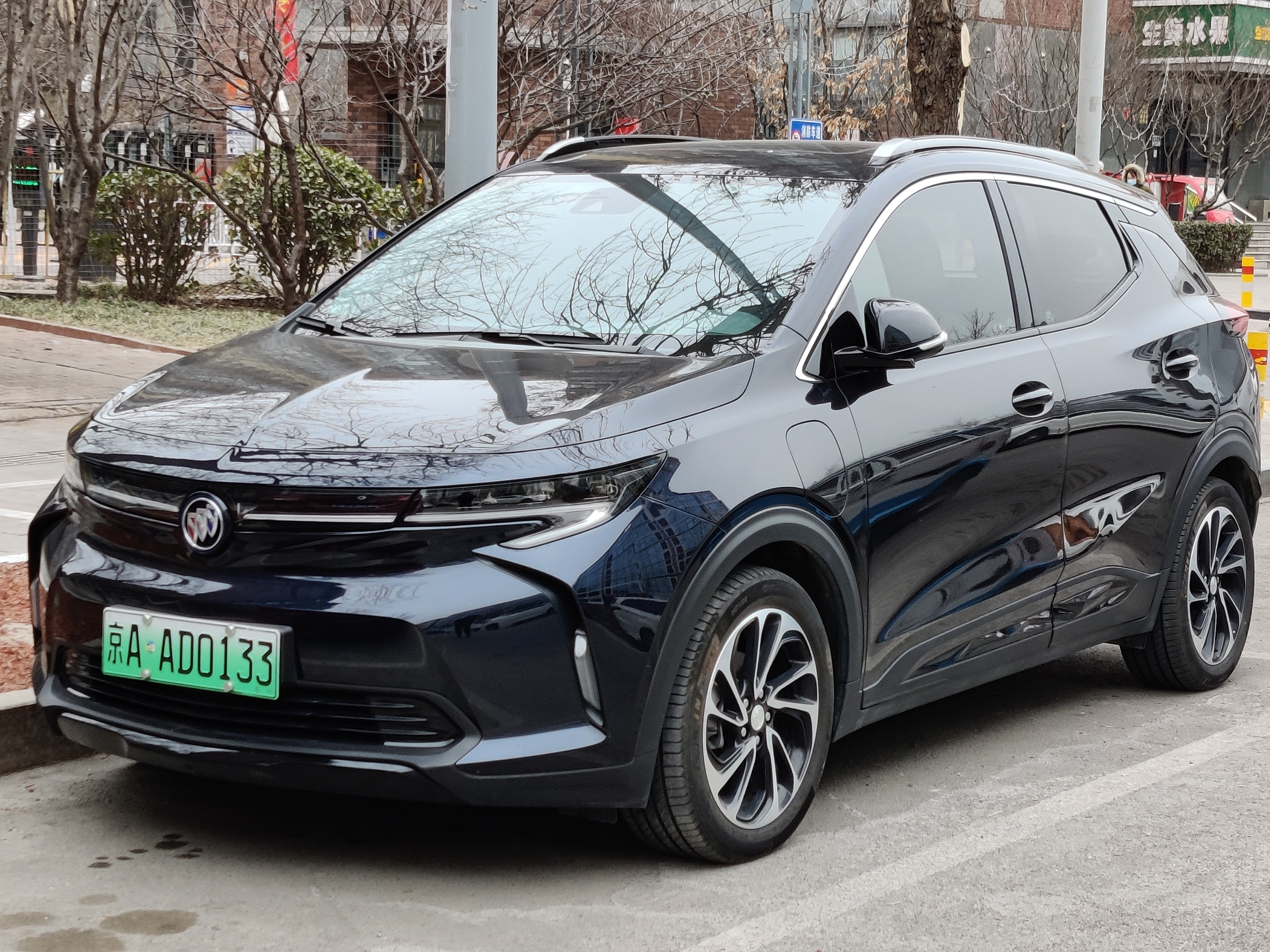
2020 Buick Velite 7

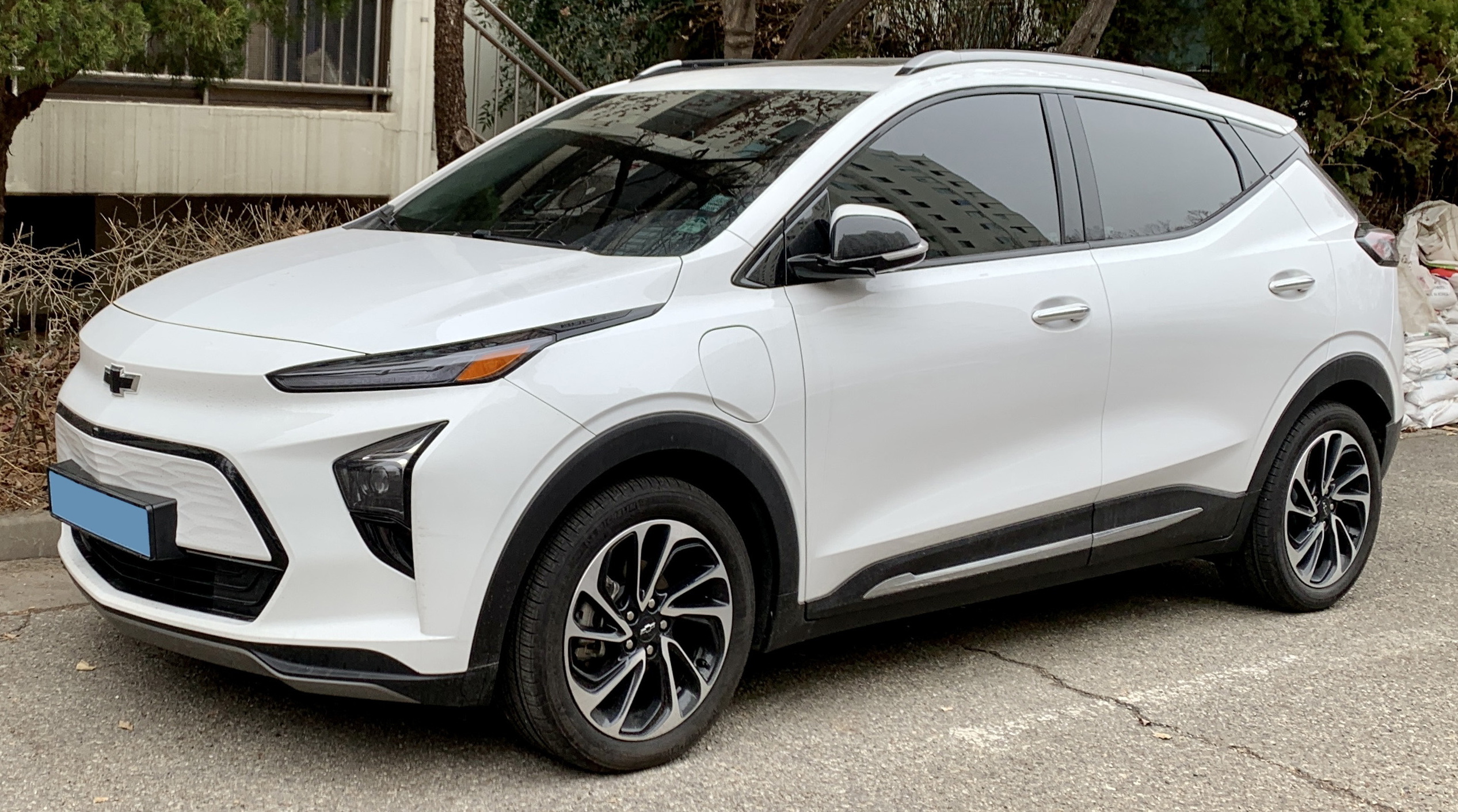
2021 Chevrolet Bolt EUV
