= Buick Velite 7 =

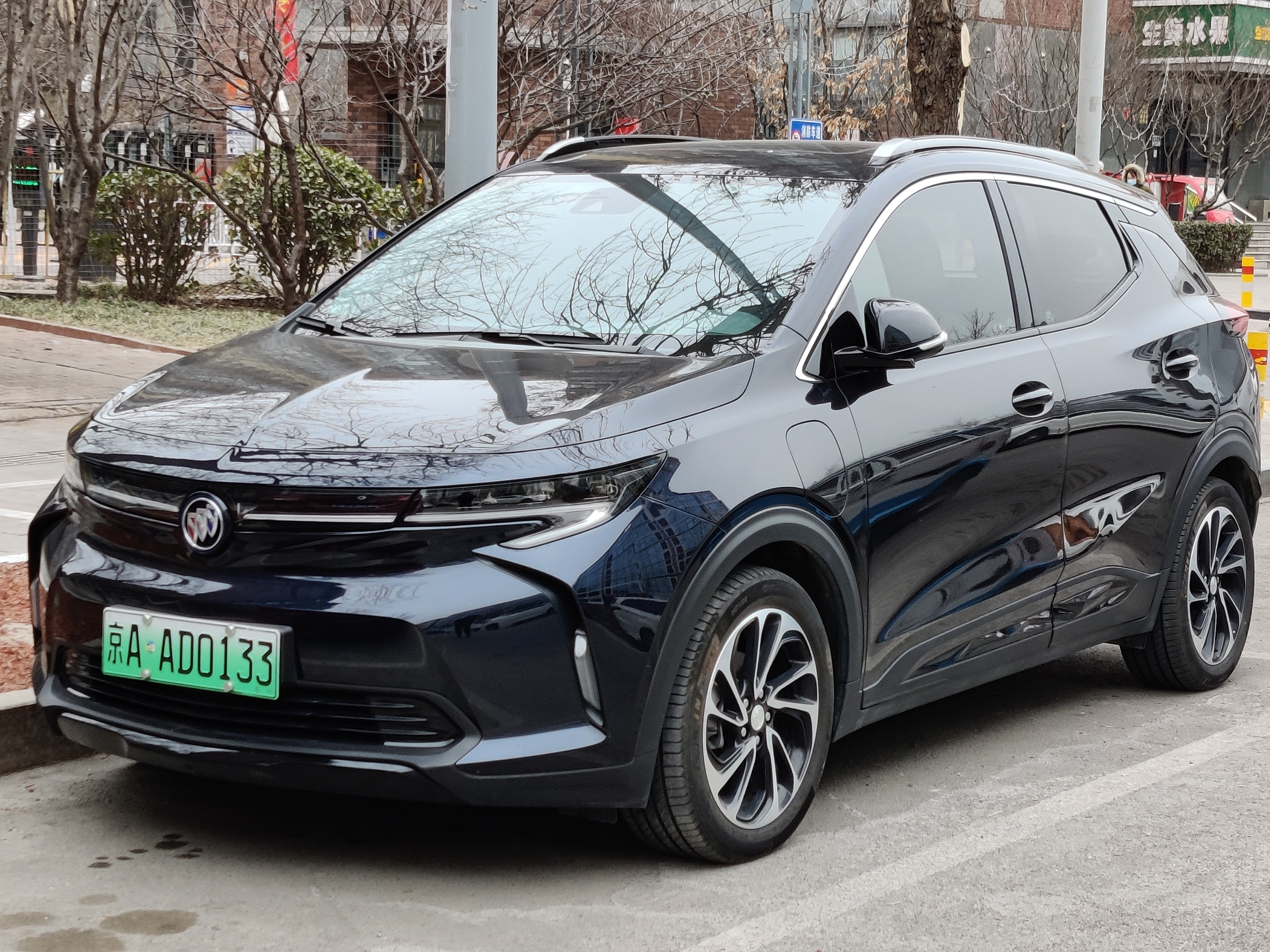
- Buick Velite 7

Overview
- Manufacturer: General Motors
- Production: 2020–2022
- Assembly: China: Jinqiao, Shanghai (SAIC-GM)

Body and chassis
- Class: Subcompact crossover SUV
- Body style: 5-door SUV
- Layout: Front-motor, front-wheel drive
- Platform: GM BEV2 platform
- Related: Chevrolet Bolt EUV; Chevrolet Bolt EV

Powertrain
- Electric motor: 1× 130 kW (170 hp) permanent magnet motor/generators
- Transmission: Single reduction gearbox
- Battery: 55.6 kWh lithium-ion
- Electric range: 500 km (311 mi)
- Plug-in charging: AC: 9.5 hours DC Fast Charge: 1 hour to 80%

Dimensions
- Wheelbase: 2,675 mm (105.3 in)
- Length: 4,264 mm (167.9 in)
- Width: 1,767 mm (69.6 in)
- Height: 1,618 mm (63.7 in)
- Curb weight: 1,660 kg (3,660 lb)

The Buick Velite 7 (Chinese: 微蓝7; pinyin: Wēilán 7) is a subcompact electric crossover that is sold exclusively in China. The Velite 7 is similar to the Chevrolet Bolt, using the same BEV2 platform, but is slightly larger.

== History ==
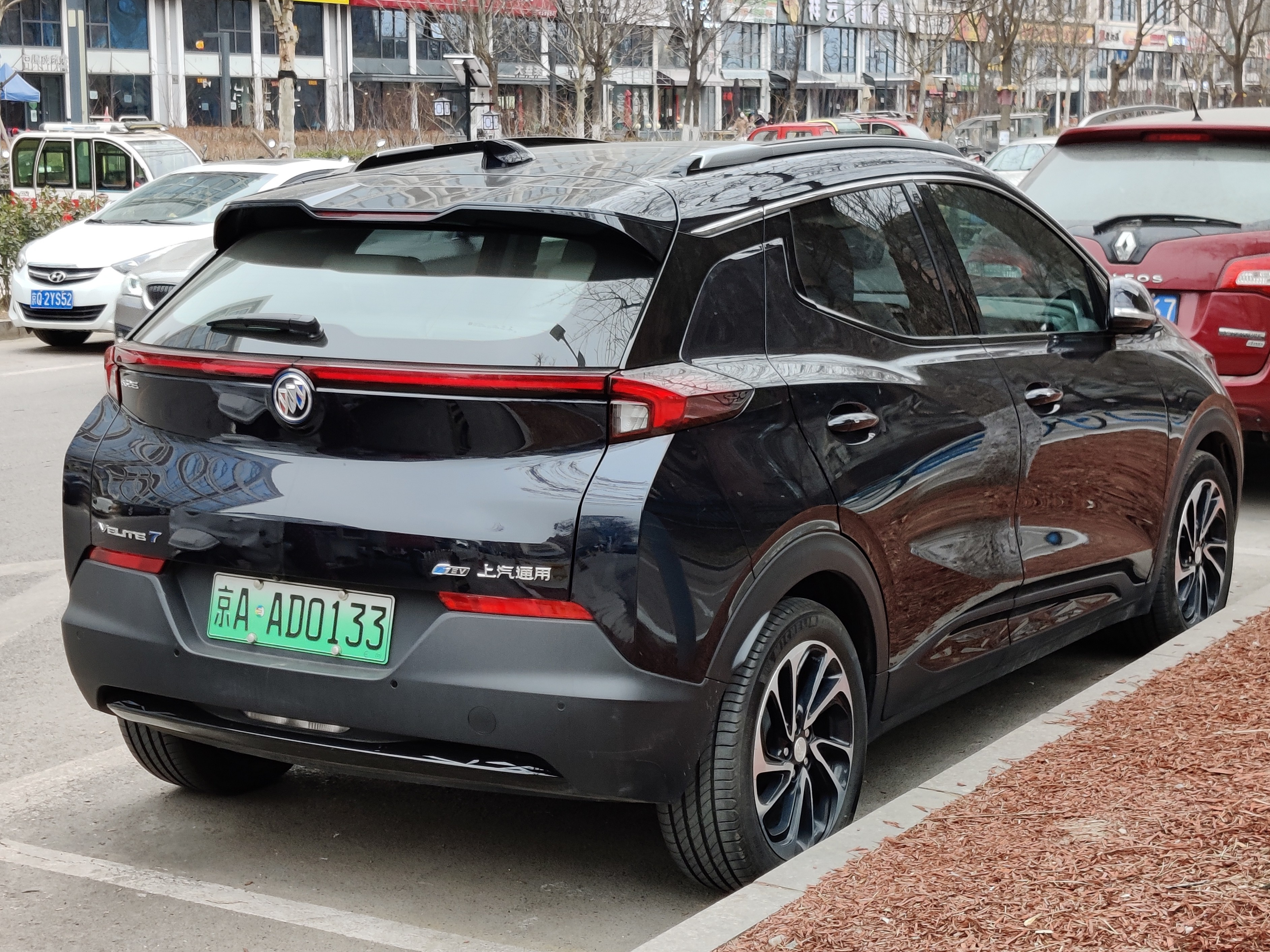
Buick Velite 7 rear

A car resembling the Buick Velite 7 first appeared in a document from 2017 describing GM's future electric vehicle plans. However, the image was quickly replaced with a covered vehicle. In January 2020, the Velite 7 was photographed while being road tested under camouflage. At the time, it was speculated this was an upcoming variant of the Chevrolet Bolt which would be released as the Bolt EUV. It was later confirmed the vehicle was the Velite 7, although the Bolt EUV is a closely related rebadged Velite with some styling differences. Undisguised photographs of the Velite 7 were released that month under a filing with the Ministry of Industry and Information Technology.

GM announced the Velite 7 in June 2020, highlighting the estimated range of 500 km (310 mi) under the NEDC testing protocol. The Velite 7 was launched in July 2020, alongside a new PHEV version of the Buick Velite 6 wagon.

== Design ==
The Buick Velite 7 is available in two variants. It features two driving modes (standard and sport), and two modes of energy recycling: Regen on Demand, and One Pedal Driving. Standard advanced driver-assistance systems include autonomous emergency braking and omniview technology.

The Velite 7 has a battery with 55.6 kWh capacity and a range of up to 500 km (310 mi) (NEDC), with an estimated consumption of 13.1 kWh/100 km (160 mpg‑e). The traction motor has a maximum output of 130 kW (174 hp; 177 PS) and 360 N⋅m (266 lb⋅ft) torque. Estimated acceleration is 0–100 km/h (62 mph) in 8.6 seconds.

It has a wheelbase of 2,675 mm (105.3 in). The cargo space of the Velite 7 behind the rear seats is 363 L (12.8 ft^{3}), expanding to 1,331 L (47.0 ft^{3}) with the seats folded down.

== Sales ==
Year	China
2020	875
2021	1,079
2022	511
2023	103
2024	7

== See also ==
- Buick Velite 6
- New energy vehicles in China
- Plug-in electric vehicle
