= Chevrolet Bolt =

Electric hatchback marketed by Chevrolet

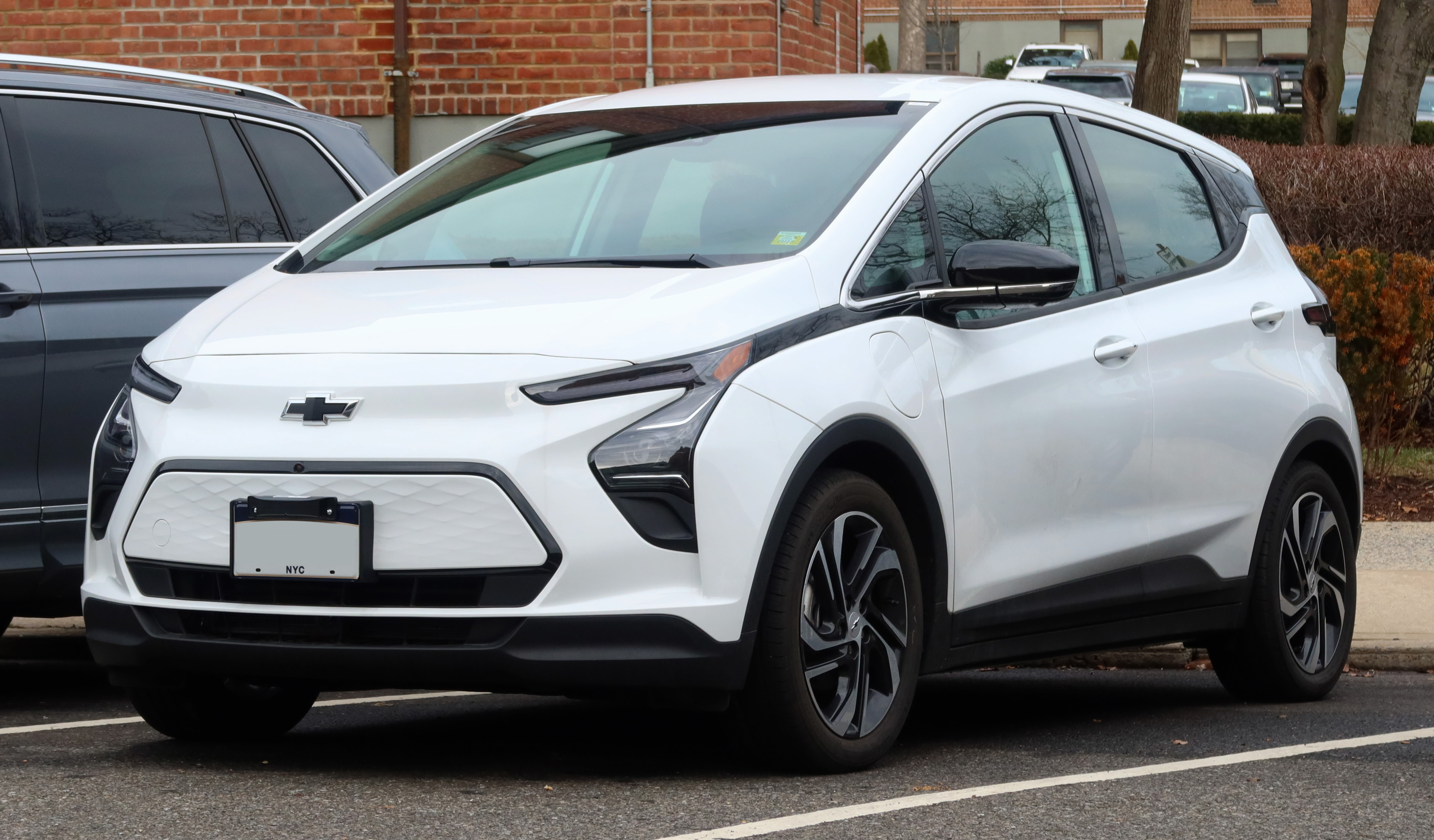
- 2022 Chevrolet Bolt EV

Overview
- Manufacturer: General Motors
- Production: 2016–2023; 2026–2027
- Model years: 2017–2023; 2027

Body and chassis
- Class: Subcompact car (2017–2023); Subcompact crossover SUV (2026–2027)
- Body style: 5-door hatchback (2017–2023); 5-door SUV (2026–2027)
- Layout: Front-motor, front-wheel drive

Chronology
- Predecessor: Chevrolet Spark EV

The Chevrolet Bolt (marketed in Europe as Opel Ampera-e (Note: Except the UK)) is a family of battery electric subcompact hatchbacks and small crossover SUVs manufactured and marketed by General Motors under its Chevrolet brand from late 2016, with hiatuses in 2021–2022 and 2023–2025. The 2017–2023 Bolt EV are hatchbacks, while the 2021–2023 Bolt EUV and 2027 Bolt are slightly larger subcompact crossover SUVs.

The first-generation Bolt was developed and manufactured with LG Corporation. Sales of the 2017 Bolt began in California in December 2016; it was released nationwide and international markets release in 2017. A rebadged European variant was marketed as the Opel Ampera-e in mainland Europe. In 2017, the Bolt was the second-best-selling plug-in car in the United States. It was named the 2017 Motor Trend Car of the Year, the 2017 North American Car of the Year, an Automobile magazine 2017 All Star, and was listed in Time magazine's Best 25 Inventions of 2016. The Ampera-e was discontinued after 2018. By the end of 2020, GM had sold 112,000 Bolt and Ampera-e cars worldwide. The first-generation Bolt had been subject to at least three recalls due to battery fire risks.

The Chevrolet Bolt EUV (short for "electric utility vehicle") is a battery electric subcompact crossover SUV, presented on February 14, 2021. As a larger version of the Bolt EV, the EUV shares its BEV2 platform and powertrain.

In mid-2023, GM officials said they would discontinue the Bolt; after outcry, they announced plans for a next-generation model. The second-generation Bolt, based on the previous Bolt EUV, was unveiled on October 9, 2025, and will go on sale in 2026 as a 2027 model.

== First generation (2016) ==
First generation
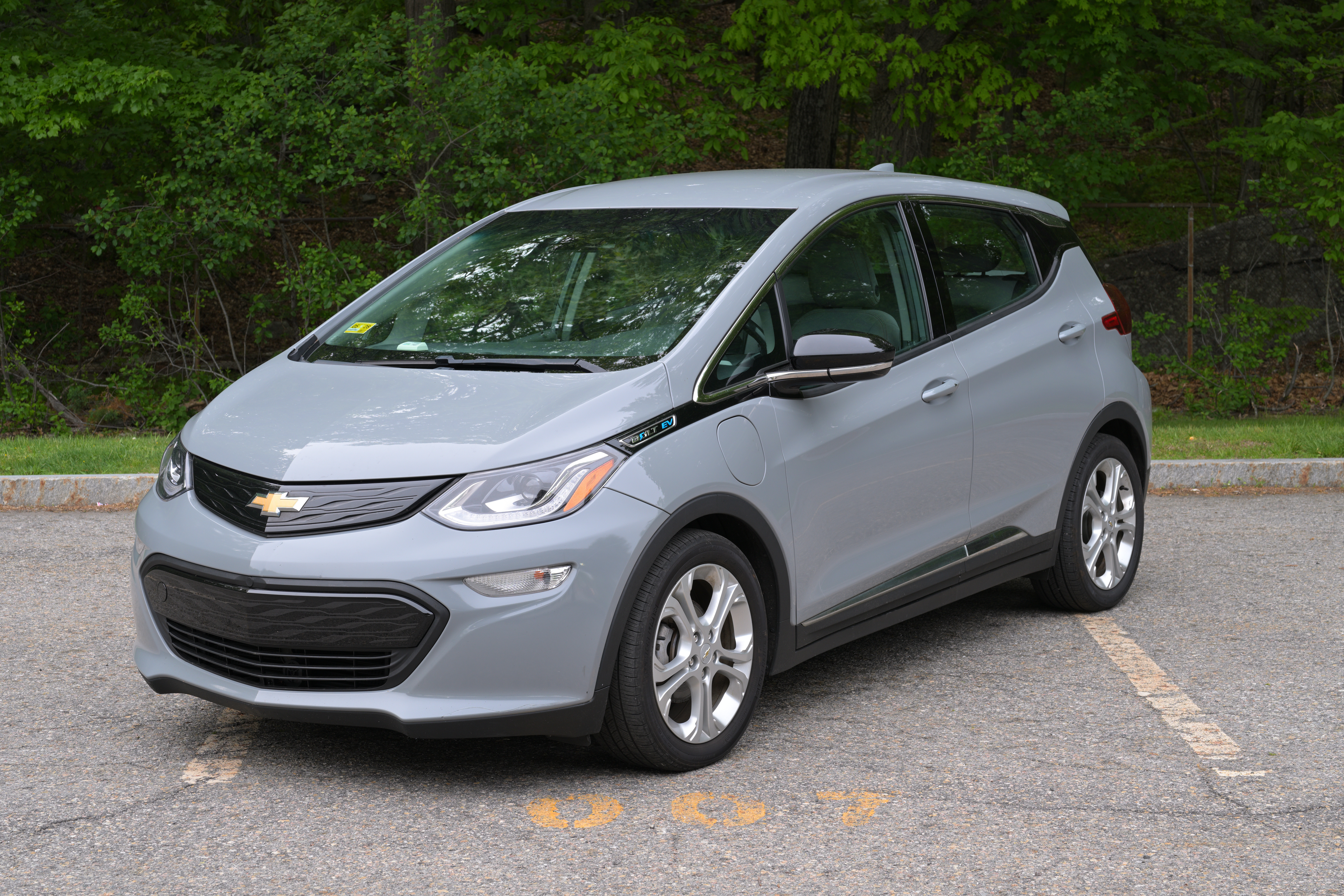
- 2020 Chevrolet Bolt EV

Overview
- Also called: Opel Ampera-e (Europe; 2016–2021)
- Production: October 2016 – December 2023
- Model years: 2017–2023
- Assembly: Battery/drivetrain, HVAC and instrument/infotainment systems at LG, Incheon, South Korea, with final assembly: GM Orion Assembly, Lake Orion, Michigan
- Designer: Sangyeon Cho

Body and chassis
- Platform: BEV II
- Related: Chevrolet Bolt EUV; Buick Velite 7

Powertrain
- Electric motor: 200 hp (149 kW) permanent magnet motor/generator, 266 lb⋅ft (361 N⋅m) torque
- Transmission: 1-speed Electronic Precision Shift, final drive gear ratio 7.05:1
- Battery: 2017–2019: 60.0 kWh lithium-ion; 2020–2023: 66.0 kWh lithium-ion; 288 cells, 96 cell groups – three cells per group
- Electric range: (2017–2019) 238 miles (383 km) (EPA); 320 miles (520 km) (NEDC); 240 miles (380 km) (WLTP); (2020–2023) 259 miles (417 km) (EPA)
- Plug-in charging: 120 V, 240 V AC, J1772, SAE Combo DC (CCS) Fast Charge

Dimensions
- Wheelbase: 102.4 in (2,601 mm)
- Length: 164.0 in (4,166 mm)
- Width: 69.5 in (1,765 mm)
- Height: 62.8 in (1,595 mm)
- Curb weight: 3,563 lb (1,616 kg)

=== History ===
==== Development ====
GM Korea began developing the Bolt in 2012 with a team of 180 people with the project code G2KCZ (G2 for Gamma 2nd-generation platform, K for hatchback, C for Chevrolet, and Z for electric car). Its initial concept debuted at the 2015 North American International Auto Show.

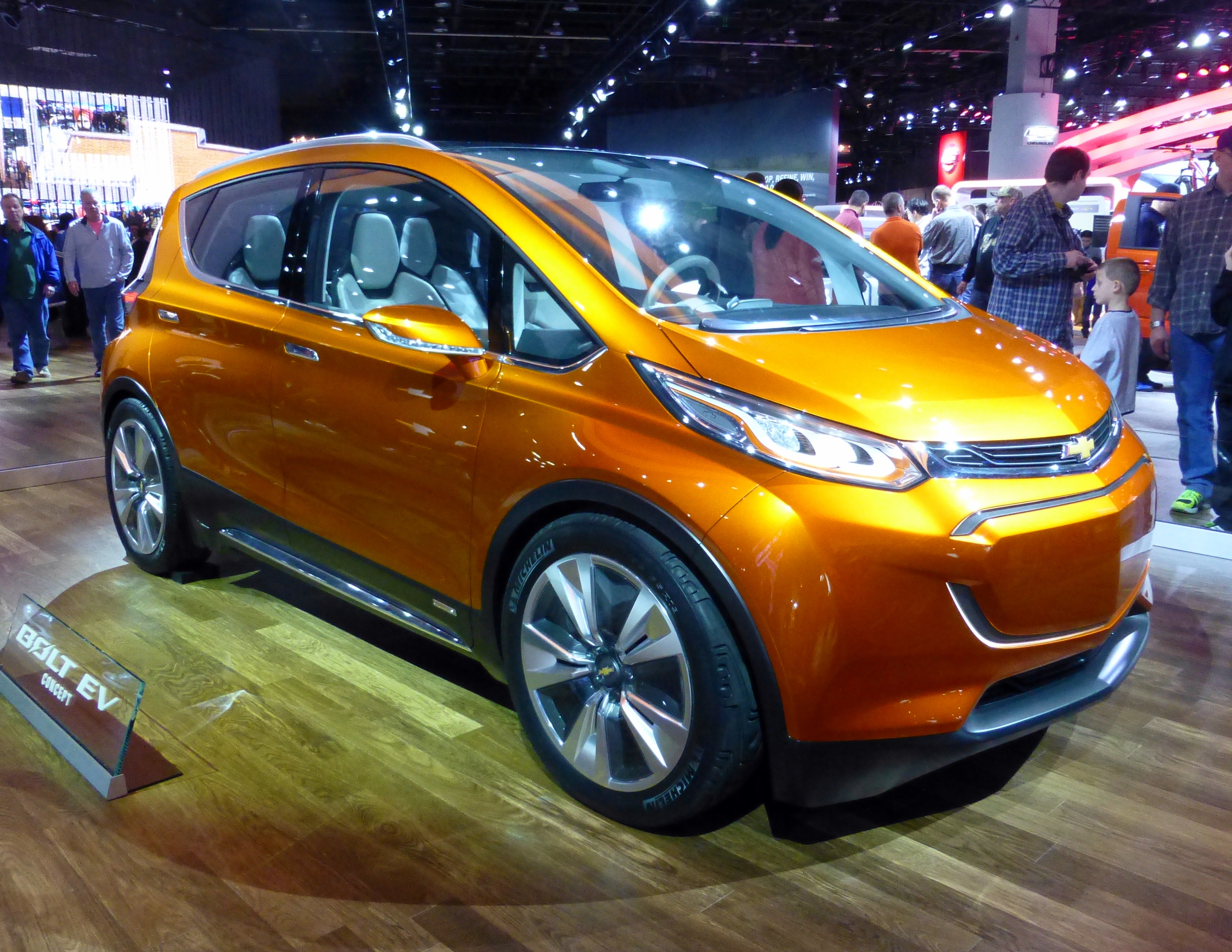
Chevrolet Bolt EV concept at the 2015 North American International Auto Show

As of June 2015, General Motors had tested more than 50 hand-built Bolt prototypes at the General Motors Proving Grounds in Milford, Michigan. The cars were tested at Proving Grounds and overseas for ride and handling dynamics, cabin comfort, quietness, charging capability, and energy efficiency.

Alan Batey, head of General Motors North America, announced in February 2015 that the Bolt EV was headed for production, and would be available in all 50 states. GM also has plans to sell the Bolt in select global markets.

In January 2016, at the Consumer Electronics Show in Las Vegas, the production version of the Chevrolet Bolt was unveiled. During GM CEO Mary Barra's keynote at the show, Chevrolet confirmed an estimated range of 200 miles (320 km) or more, an approximate US$30,000 price tag (after government incentives), and stated it would be available in late 2016. Barra projected in February 2016 that the European version, marketed as the Opel Ampera-e (or Vauxhall Ampera-e in the United Kingdom), would enter production in 2017.

In March 2016, GM released photos and a short pre-production video of the Bolt at the company's Orion Assembly plant outside Detroit, testing manufacturing and tooling. The car's user interface was developed in Israel.

==== Profitability ====
An unnamed source cited by Bloomberg News estimated that General Motors is expected to take a loss of US$8,000 to US$9,000 per Bolt sold. A GM spokesman declined to comment about expected profitability. Opel refuted that in December 2016 and stated that GM has battery cell costs of $130/kWh, and industry is not yet optimized for mass production. A UBS tear-down in 2017 suggested slightly smaller losses per vehicle, of $7418 on a base spec, or $5520 on a higher spec vehicle. They estimate that by 2025 the Bolt will make a profit of about $6000 per vehicle.

==== Production ====
Final assembly took place at GM's Orion Assembly plant in Orion Township, Michigan, which received a US$160 million upgrade for Bolt production. Manufacture of the battery, motor, and drive unit started in August 2016 at LG, Incheon, South Korea.

The car is designed for flexible production by having some of the battery in the same position as the fuel tank in internal combustion engine-powered cars, and is made on the same assembly line as the Chevrolet Sonic at a combined rate of 90,000 per year. Although the car is assembled near Detroit, it has only 20% domestic-parts content.

Analysts expected Bolt production at 22,000 per year, and Ampera-e at a few thousand. Production may increase to 30,000 to 50,000 per year according to demand. Regular production was expected to begin in October 2016 at 25,000–30,000 the first year. Initial regular production had begun by early November 2016 at a rate of 9 per hour, gradually increasing to 30 per hour. Retail deliveries began in California in December 2016.

Bolt production was halted on August 23, 2021, while battery production was redirected to replacements under a recall affecting the 140,000 Bolt EVs that had been produced up to that time. Production was not restarted until April 4, 2022.

==== Recalls ====
In November 2020, 50,932 Chevrolet Bolt vehicles of model year 2017–2019 were recalled due to potential fire risk. According to GM, these vehicles contained high voltage batteries produced at LG Chem's Ochang plant that may pose a risk of fire "when charged to full, or very close to full, capacity".

As a precautionary measure, Chevrolet issued software updates that allow dealers to install a battery charge limit of 90% to their existing inventory while urging current 2017–2019 Chevy Bolt owners to enable the "Hill Top Reserve" option (2017-2018MY) or to set vehicle "Target Charge Level" (2019-2022MY) to 90%. A final software update was expected to remedy the charging capacity to 100% sometime in April 2021. As of November 2020, the National Highway Traffic Safety Administration has confirmed five known fires with two injuries and recommends parking recalled vehicles outside, away from homes, until they have been repaired.

On August 20, 2021, Chevrolet extended the recall to include all Bolt models (both EV and EUV) and model years (2017–2022) totaling the number of recalled Chevy Bolt cars to nearly 142,000. GM will replace the recalled vehicles' batteries, citing manufacturing defects by its partner LG, which could be responsible for the shorting of deficient battery cells. Amid further investigation, GM says it will ramp up production of replacement battery cells with LG Chem, while seeking reimbursement for the recall from the manufacturer, as GM expects the expense to be $1.8 billion. LG Chem had to pay $1.9 billion to GM. Some of the recalled battery packs were repurposed in grid batteries.

Cars which have had the battery-replacement recall done have the 259-mile (417-kilometre) range of the 2020-up Bolt, and the new batteries are warrantied for 8 years from the date of installation.

=== Discontinuation and planned revival ===
In January 2022, GM announced that the Orion Township factory would be retooled at a cost of $4 billion to produce Chevrolet Silverado EV and GMC Sierra EV pickup trucks, starting in 2024.

The affordable segment targeted by the Bolt was expected to be filled by the Chevrolet Equinox EV as GM shifts its EVs to Ultium third-generation battery technology. On April 25, 2023, GM CEO Mary Barra said that the Bolt and Bolt EUV would be discontinued at the end of 2023 to make room for GM's "new generation of electric vehicles."

The announcement drew public outcry. On July 25, 2023, Barra said there were plans for a second-generation Bolt using Ultium hardware and Ultifi software. Plans for this new Bolt only include the Bolt EUV body style.

GM ended Bolt production on December 20, 2023.

=== Design ===
The Bolt was designed from 2012 by a team of 180 people at GM Korea as a B-segment entry on its own platform, the GM BEV2. It does not share elements with the GM Gamma platform cars like the Chevrolet Sonic/Spark.

The EPA classifies the Bolt as "small station wagon", with less than 130 cu ft (3,681.2 L) of interior volume. GM refers to the Bolt as a crossover and puts it under the category of SUV on its website. The passenger volume is 94 cu ft (2,700 L), and cargo space is 17 cu ft (480 L) (381 liter).

The Bolt's doors, tailgate, and hood are aluminum. The driver can adjust the level of regenerative braking as the accelerator pedal is lifted. The front seats are asymmetrical to maximize cabin volume while accommodating airbags.

GM planned for over-the-air software updates during 2017 but the feature was finally released to the Bolt in April 2018.

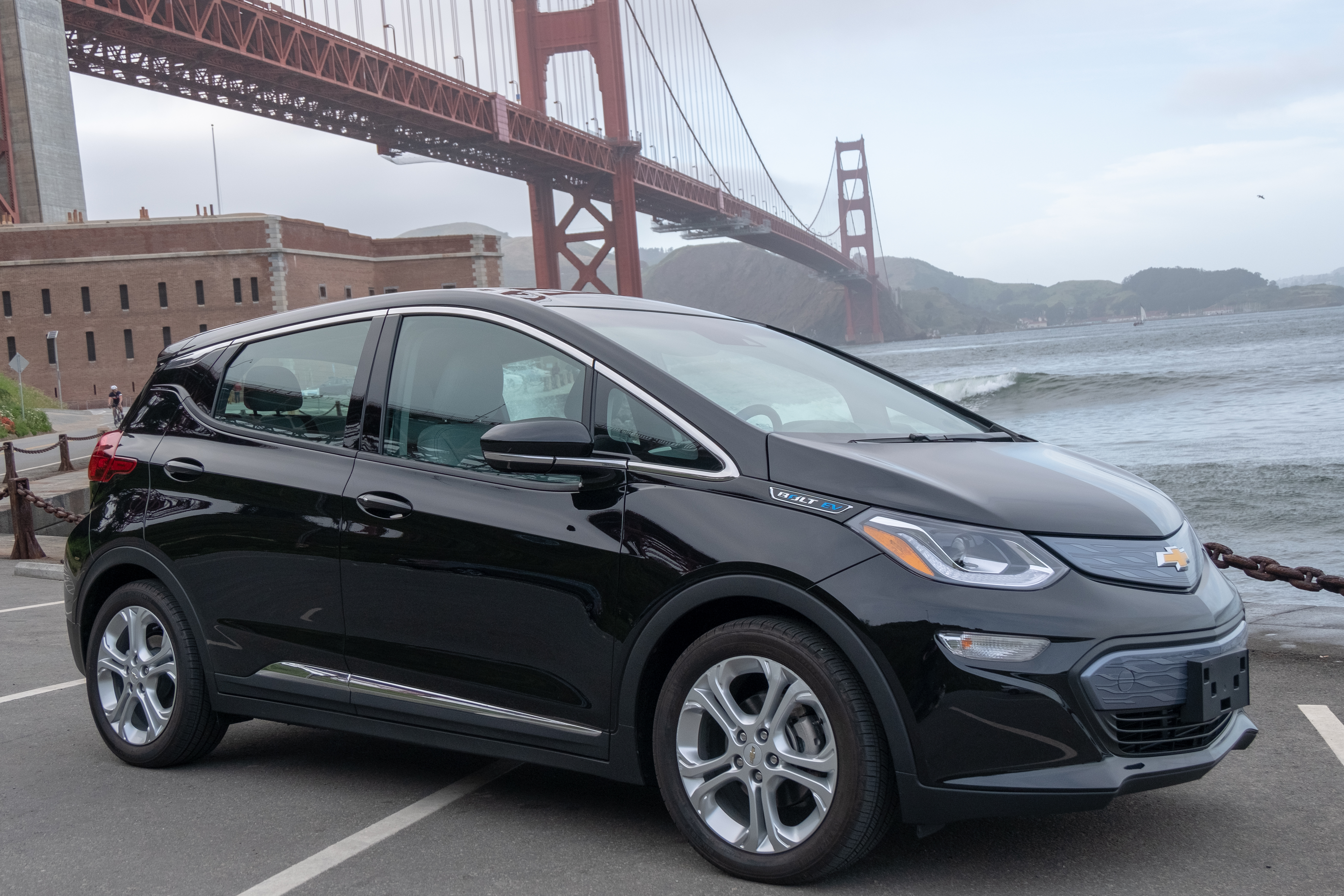
Front (at Fort Point, San Francisco)

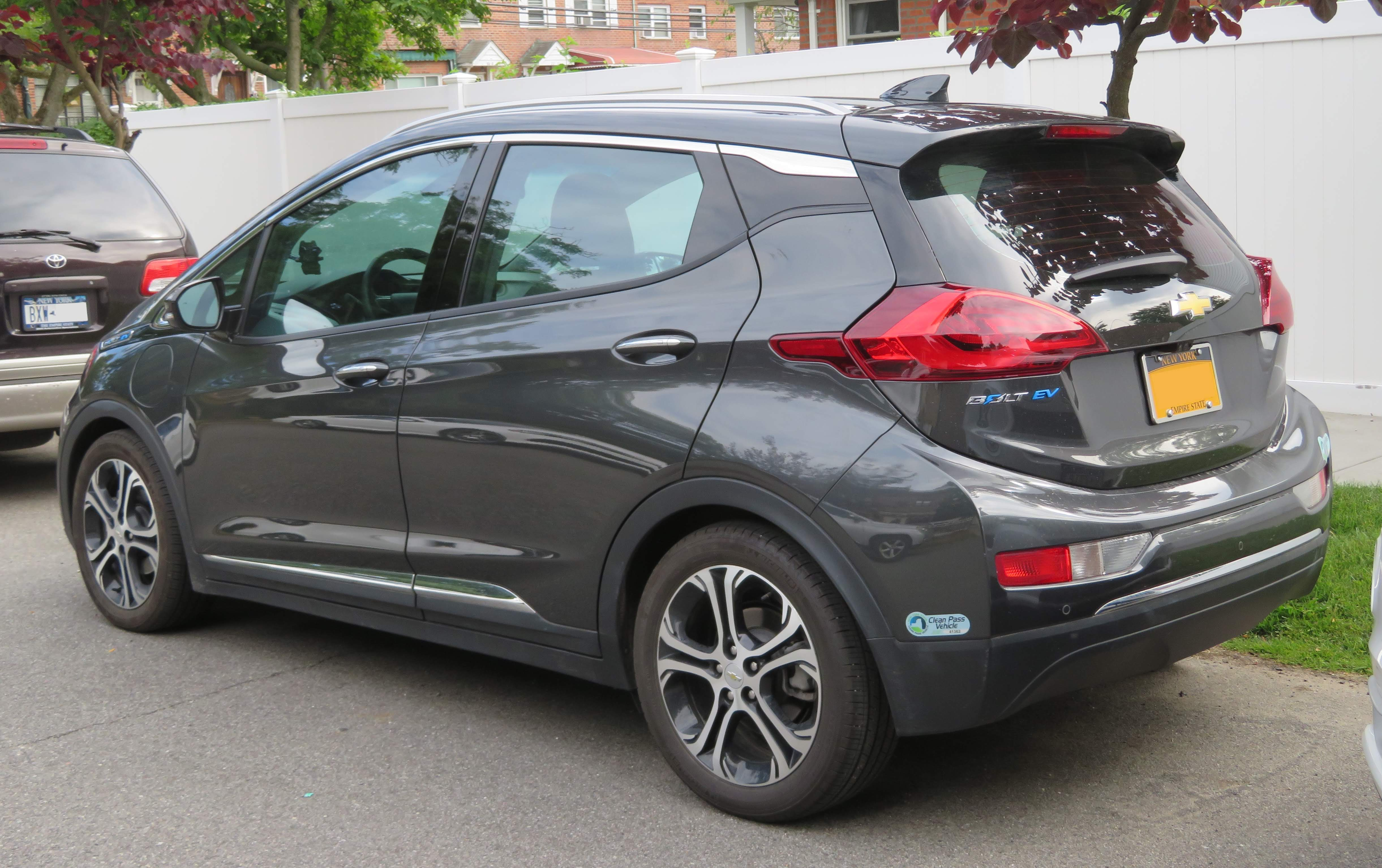
Rear

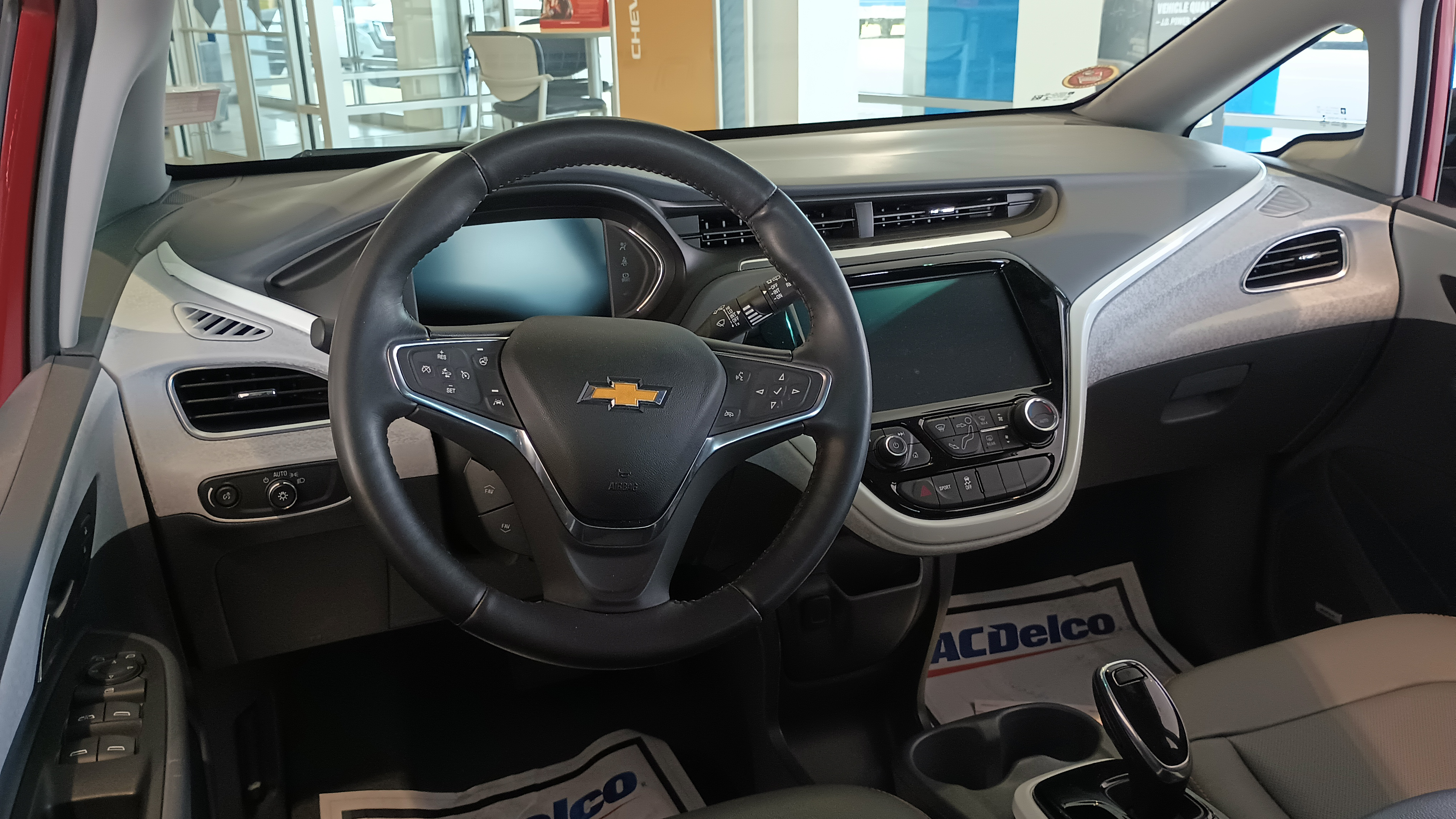
Dashboard

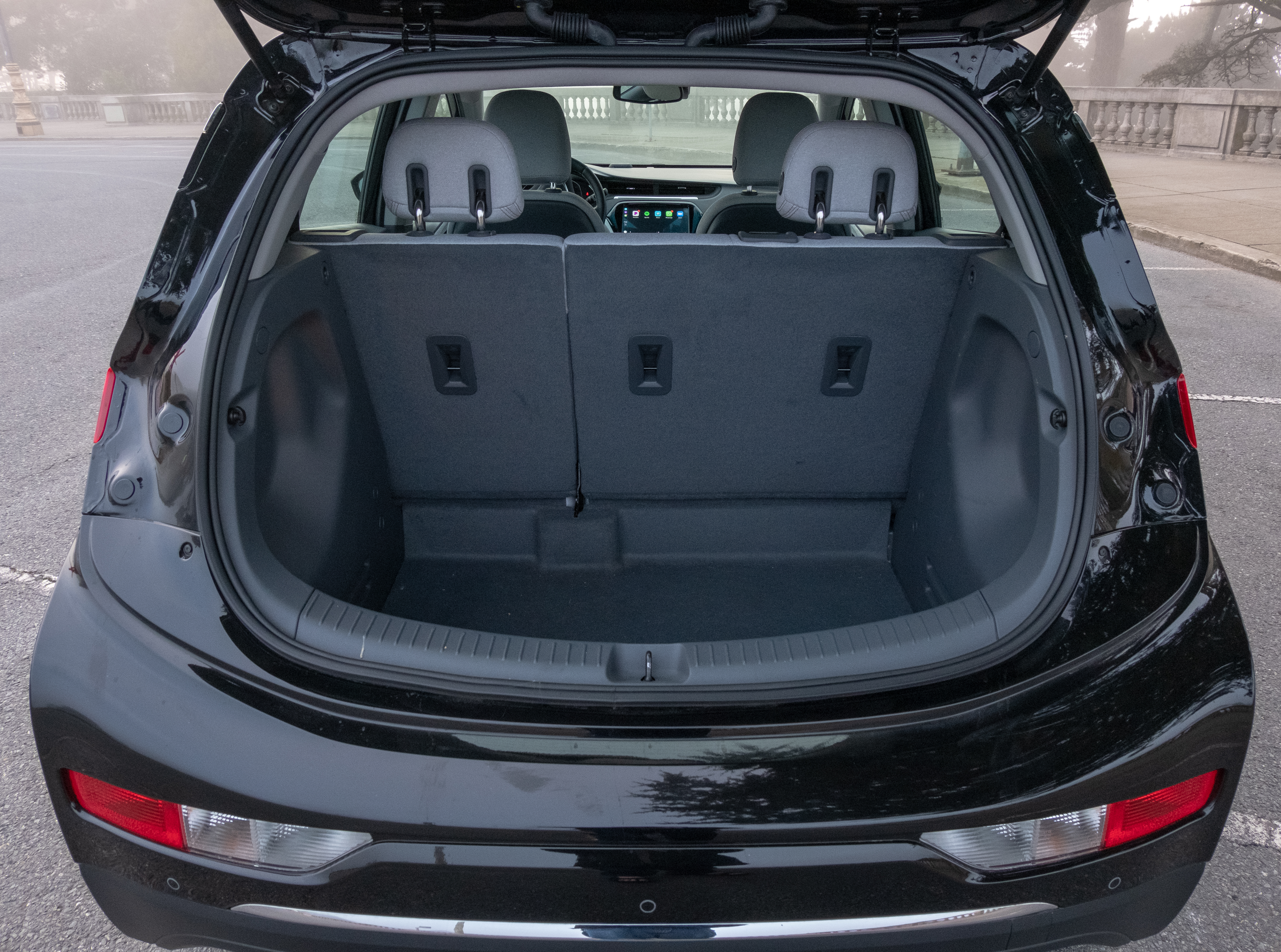
Cargo area

==== Pre-production name confusion ====
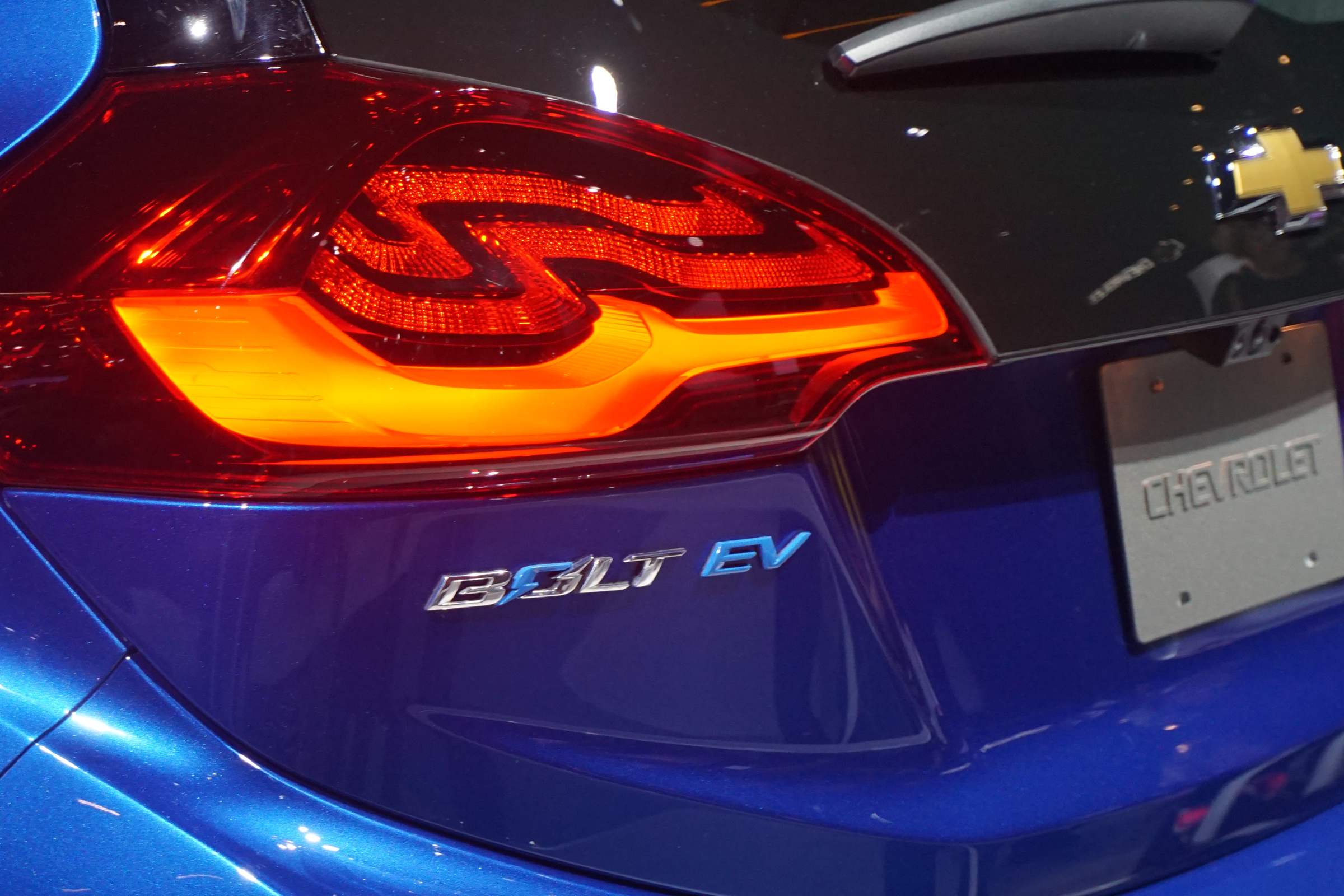
2017 Chevrolet Bolt EV badge.

In 2015, Chevrolet officials said they were considering changing the name Bolt because it was being confused with the five-year-old Volt, another electric car sold by the company. Chevrolet's marketing chief, Tim Mahoney, subsequently announced GM would keep the Bolt name.

Autoblog projected similar confusion among customers in Europe, where the Opel Ampera-e (the Bolt variant) was just one letter off from the Opel Ampera, the previous-generation Volt sold in Europe.

Tata Motors has sold a car named Bolt since 2014, and has registered the trademark in India and other countries.

==== Cruise AV (autonomous vehicle) ====
Cruise AVs in San Francisco

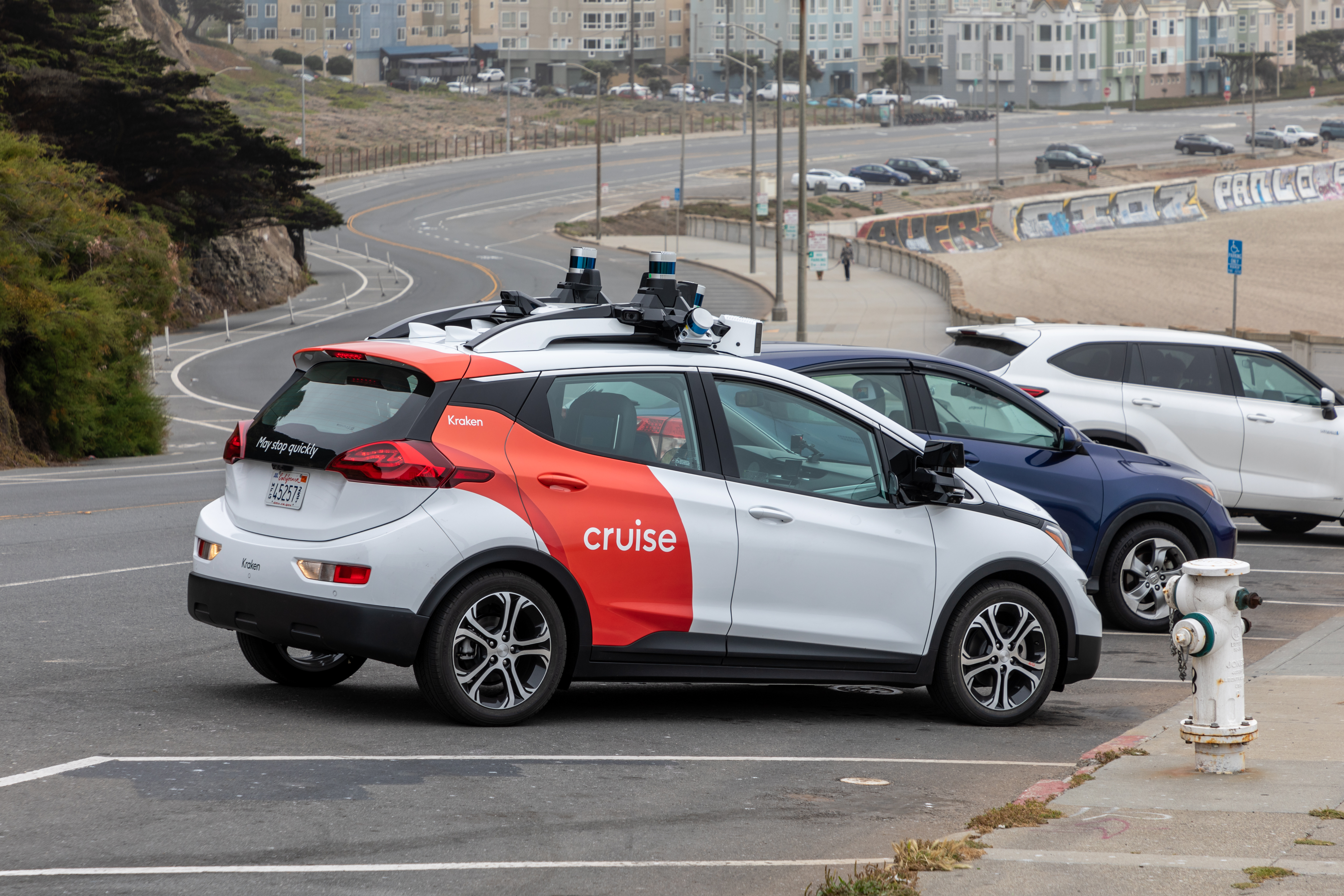
G2 named "Kraken"

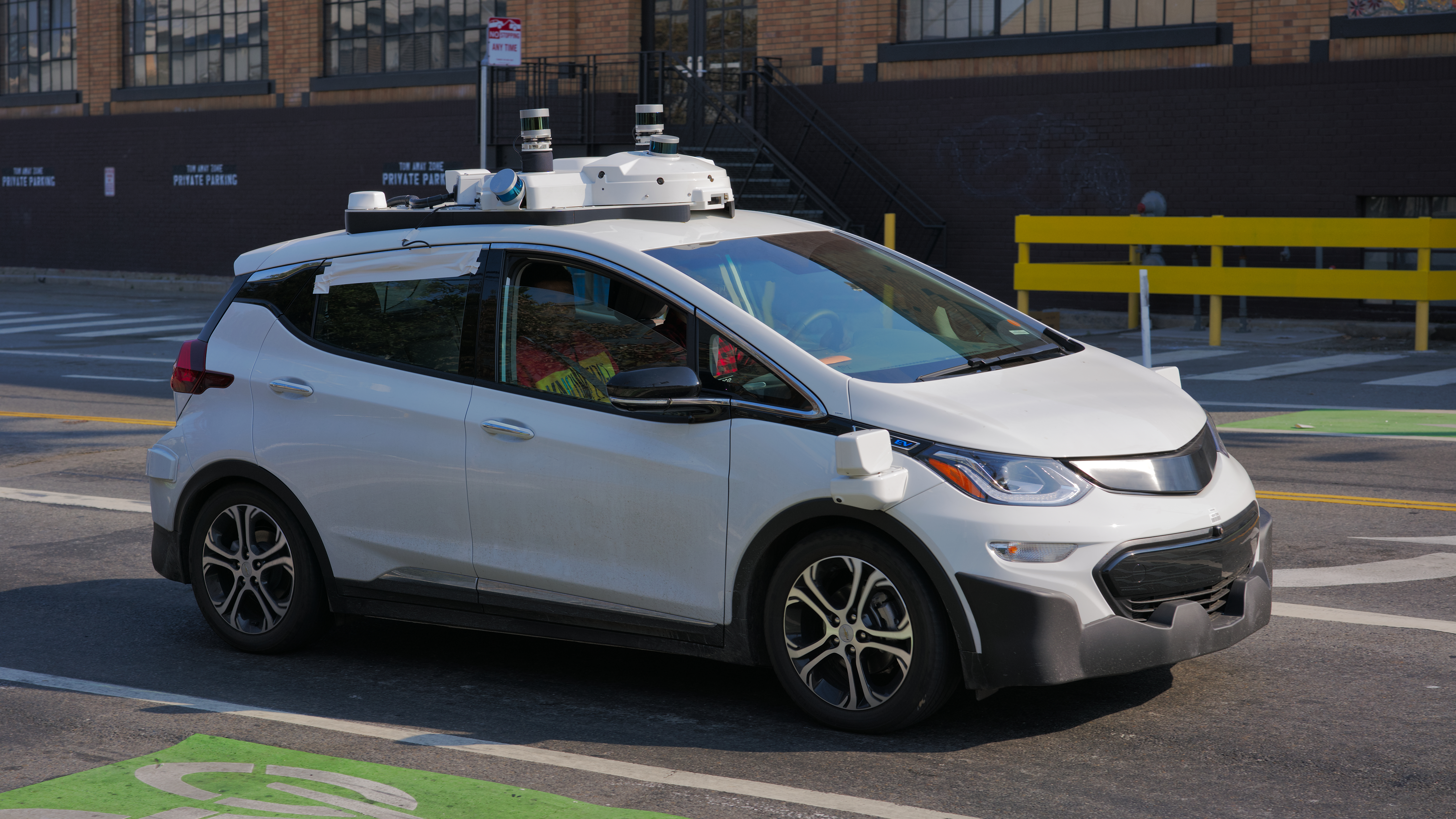
Unnamed G3

The Cruise AV is a Bolt EV-based autonomous vehicle developed and tested by Cruise Automation, whose majority owner is General Motors; GM acquired Cruise in March 2016.

Pre-production versions of the Bolt EV were built at Orion Assembly in March 2016 and sent to Cruise, which modified the cars by adding sensors in San Francisco. The modified pre-production vehicles were photographed in San Francisco in May. Fifty of these first-generation (G1) Bolt EV-based Cruise AVs were tested from June 2016 in the San Francisco Bay Area and Scottsdale, Arizona.

After its acquisition by GM in March 2016, Cruise began working with GM engineers to develop the 2nd-generation (G2) Cruise AV, which would be assembled alongside regular production Bolt EVs at Orion Assembly. The G1 Cruise AV has two roof-mounted LIDAR sensors, four small round headlights, and the Chevrolet "bowtie" logo on the front grille, while the G2 has five LIDARs and the same styling as the regular production Bolt. A fleet of 130 G2 Cruise AVs were completed by June 2017, with an expanded, better-integrated sensor suite. The G2 (and G3) Cruise AVs are equipped with five roof-mounted LIDARs, 16 cameras, and 21 radars (both long- and short-range as well as articulating). The first G1 Cruise AV was retired and sent to the Henry Ford Museum in March 2019.

A prototype 3rd-generation (G3) Cruise AV was shown in September 2017; Cruise CEO Kyle Vogt said the G3 AV was designed to incorporate redundant systems and was ready to be scaled up for mass production at the Orion Township factory. In addition, the G3 AV uses fault-tolerant electrical, communication, and actuation systems unique to the automated vehicle and not shared with the Bolt EV. With the completion of 50 G3 Cruise AVs in fall 2017, GM now considers the vehicle a separate model from the Bolt. Externally, the G3 Cruise AV may be distinguished from the G2 by the color of the rooftop sensor package (black on the G2, white on the G3) and the two articulating radars: on the G2, these are black and replace the side rear-view mirrors on the G2; on the G3, these are white and are mounted just above the front wheels.

Members of the press were invited to ride in a G2 Cruise AV in November 2017; they reported the choices made by the car's programming were conservative, but the self-driving system had minimal disengagements over the short 2.4 to 3 mi (3.9 to 4.8 km) trips. In January 2018, Cruise showed renderings and a prototype of its planned 4th-generation (G4) AV, which removed the traditional driver's controls such as the steering wheel and pedals and largely retained the external features of the G2, but further development of the G4 Cruise AV was canceled to concentrate on their next generation autonomous vehicle, the Origin, which was unveiled in January 2020 and lacks driver controls entirely. The Origin is scheduled to be introduced in January 2023. Cruise received approval to test cars without safety drivers on public roads in October 2020; the first SAE level 4 vehicles tested by Cruise were G3 AVs. The safety driver was relegated to the passenger's (right-hand) front seat and did not have access to the traditional controls.

Later in 2021, a G2 Cruise AV nicknamed "Poppy" was filmed for a short promotional video while undergoing testing in San Francisco. The California Public Utilities Commission approved Cruise's application in June 2022; with the permit, Cruise plans to start offering driverless revenue taxi services in San Francisco with Cruise AVs.

==== Refresh (2022–2023) ====
Updated (2022) Bolt EV

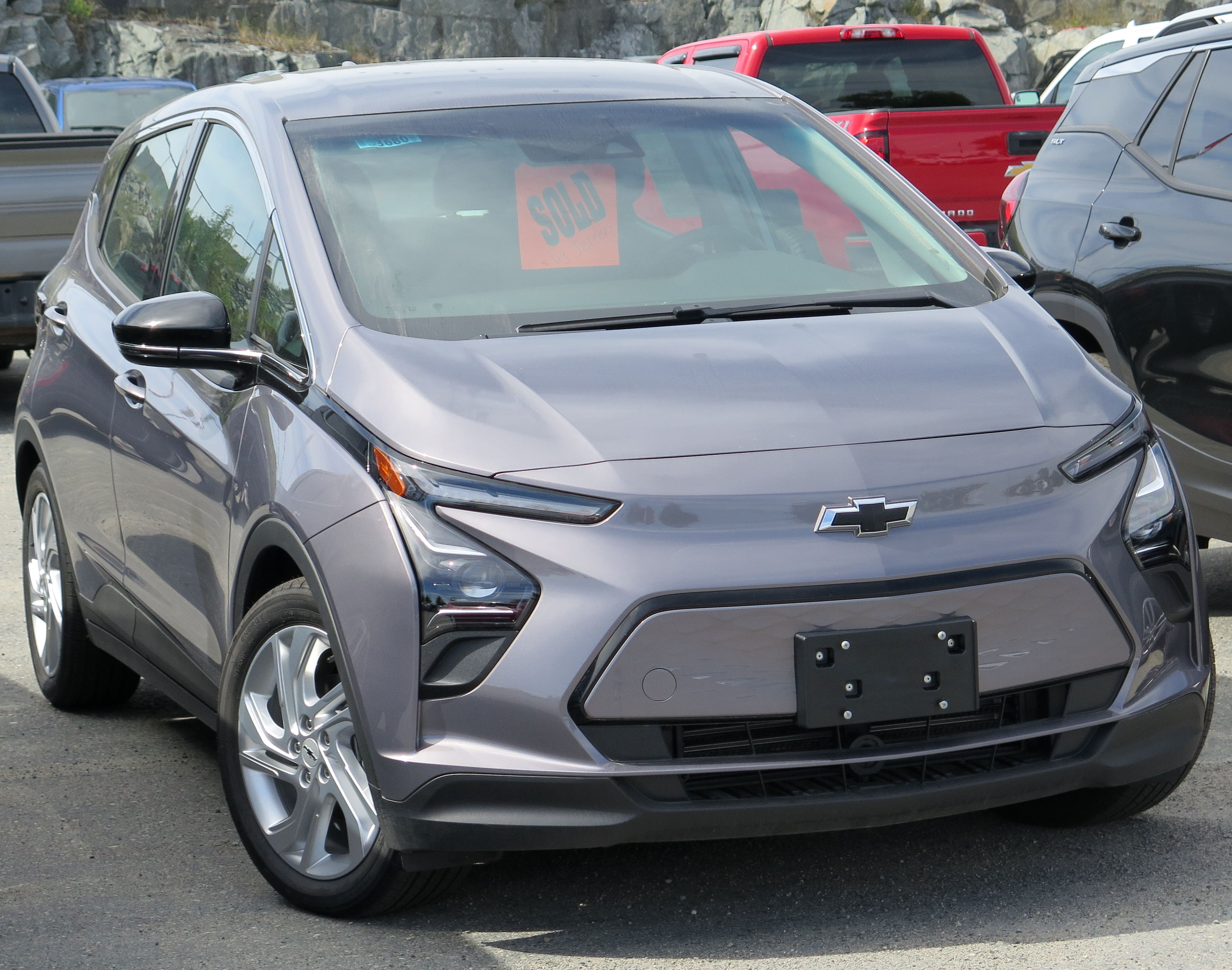
Front

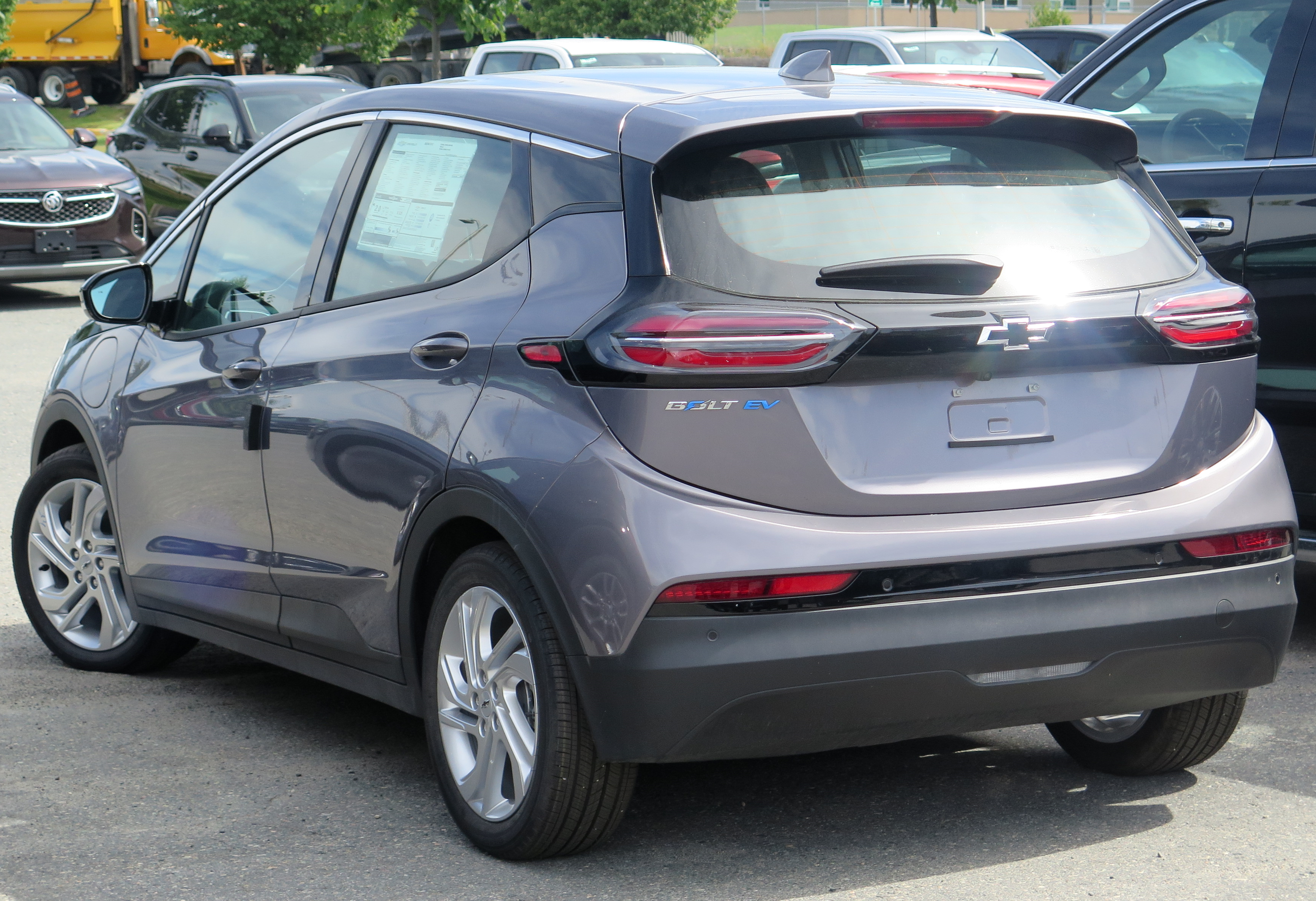
Rear

For the 2022 model year, the Bolt received front and rear styling revisions, along with a revised interior. The front end carries new headlights, along with a new faux-grille and trim. The tail lights and the tailgate hatch also differ slightly from the previous model. Inside, the shifter was replaced with gear shifter buttons and the seats were upgraded and now are slightly larger, with more padding. The interior received a larger info screen. In addition, the electronics were updated with new software, and the L2 charging system was increased to allow charging at 48 amps, up from 32 amps. Dimensions of the vehicle remain unchanged.

GM also began selling a Bolt EUV crossover SUV alongside the existing Bolt EV hatchback that year. The EUV and EV share the same BEV2 platform; however, the EUV has an extended wheelbase and some improved features.

=== Specifications ===
==== Battery ====
The Bolt's battery uses "nickel-rich lithium-ion" chemistry, allowing the cells to run at higher temperatures than those in GM's previous electric vehicles, allowing a simpler and cheaper liquid cooling system for the 60 kWh (220 MJ) battery pack. The battery pack is a stressed member and weighs 960 lb (440 kg). It accounts for 23% of the car's value, and is composed of 288 flat "landscape" format cells. Cells are bundled into groups of three connected in parallel, and 96 groups connected in series compose the pack, which is rated at 160 kW peak power. GM offers a battery warranty of 8 years / 100,000 miles (160,000 km), and has no plans for other battery sizes.

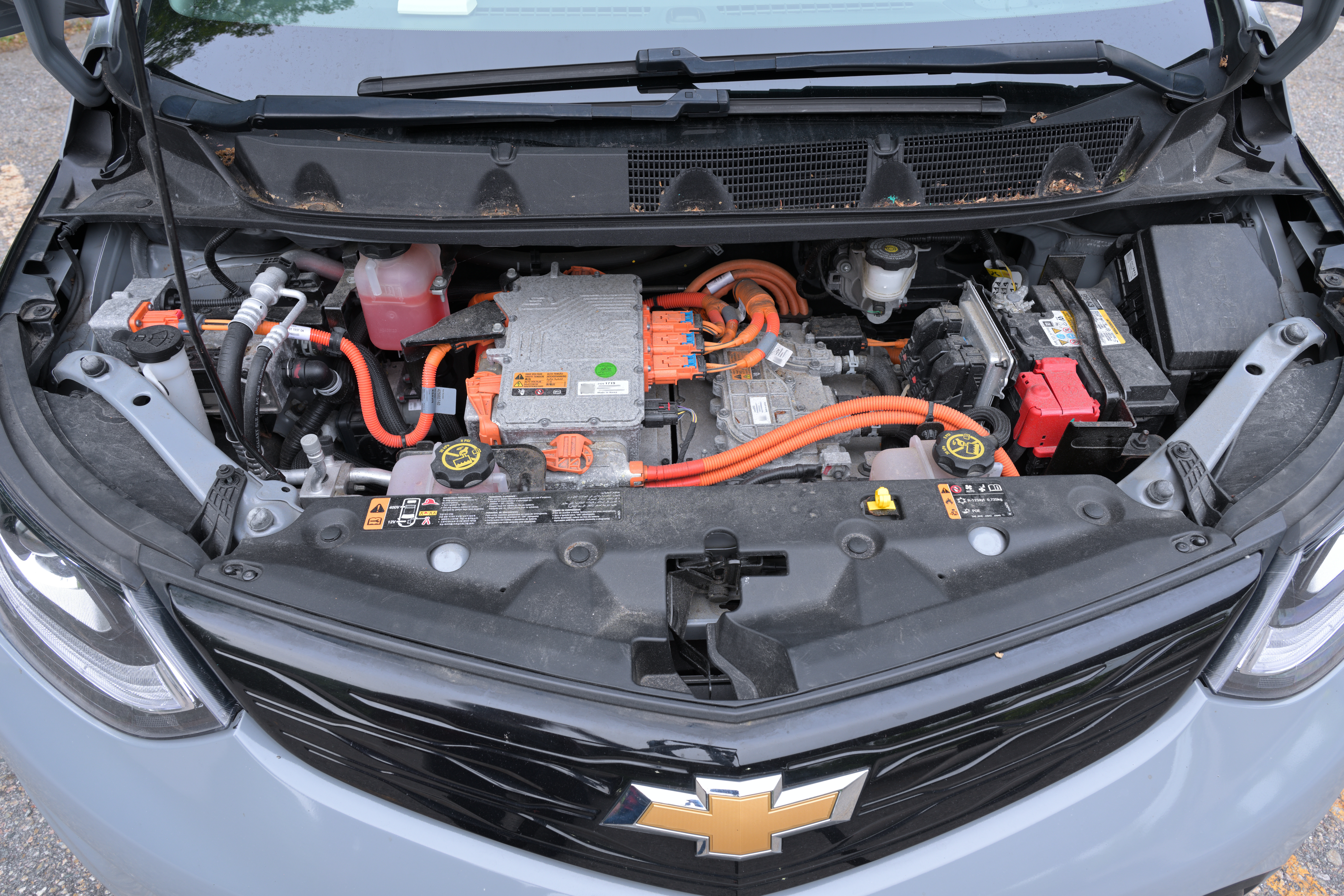
Electrical components under the hood of a 2020 Chevy Bolt EV

In October 2015, General Motors said they would purchase the Bolt's battery cells at a price of $145 per kilowatt hour from LG Chem, representing a minimum of $8,700 in revenue per car. The cost is reportedly about $100 cheaper per kWh than the price LG was giving other customers at the time. GM estimated a cell price of $130/kWh in December 2016.

While initially expected to share its lithium-ion battery technology with the second-generation Chevrolet Volt, the production version of the Bolt uses batteries with a different chemistry more suited to the charge cycles of a long-range electric vehicle, compared to the more frequent charging/discharging of hybrids and short-range EVs.

The 2020 model year's battery capacity increased to 66 kWh because of a small change made to the battery chemistry that increased the EPA-rated range by 21 miles (34 km). Physically, the battery is 50.2 in (1,280 mm) wide, 71.1 in (1,810 mm) long, and 7.3 to 13.7 in (190 to 350 mm) high, weighing 947 lb (430 kg).

==== Drivetrain ====
Other specifications include a 200 hp (149 kW) and 266 lb⋅ft (361 N⋅m) interior permanent magnet electric motor, acceleration from 0–30 mph (0–48 km/h) in 2.9 seconds and 0–60 mph (0–97 km/h) in less than 7 seconds, and a top speed of 91 mph (146 km/h). The 72-slot/8-pole electric motor is integrated with a single-speed transmission and differential, to form a single modular drive unit that connects directly to the front axles. The single-speed transmission has a final drive ratio of 7.05:1.

==== Body and chassis ====
The Bolt EV is tall hatchback design, with a curb weight of 3,580 pounds (1,620 kg). Despite its height of nearly 63 inches (1.6 meters), the center of gravity is less than 21 inches (53 cm) above the ground, thanks to the under-floor mounting of the battery pack. This yields surprisingly stable handling during cornering.

Bolt uses the now-common kammback/hatchback low-drag body design, with sweeping curves leading to an abrupt back end. It was initially reported to have a drag coefficient of Cd=0.32 but GM says the final production vehicle has Cd=0.308.

==== Range and efficiency ====
Under the U.S. Environmental Protection Agency (EPA) five-cycle test methodology, the Bolt fuel economy is rated at 119 miles per gallon gasoline equivalent (mpg-e) (17.6 kWh/100 km) for combined driving, 128 mpg‑e (16.4 kWh/100 km) in city and 110 mpg‑e (19 kWh/100 km) in highway.

The Bolt EV has a combined EPA-rated range of 238 miles (383 km). For city driving, the EPA rated the Bolt range at 255 miles (410 km), and due to its relatively high drag coefficient, its range for highway driving is 217 miles (349 km).

The Ampera-e has a certified range of 320 miles (520 km) under the New European Driving Cycle (NEDC) test cycle with a full battery, and achieved a range of 240 miles (380 km) under the more strict Worldwide harmonized Light vehicles Test Procedures (WLTP). Opel expected the Ampera-e to achieve a NEDC range of about 500 km (310 mi).

Before the Tesla Model 3 was introduced in July 2017, the Bolt was the only plug-in electric car with a manufacturer's suggested retail price (MSRP) of less than US$50,000 capable of delivering an EPA-rated range of over 200 miles (320 km).

As of the 2020 model year, the Bolt has an EPA all-electric range of 259 miles (417 km), up from 238 miles (383 km) for the 2017–2019 model years, and EPA fuel economy rating of 119 mpg‑e (17.6 kWh/100 km) for combined city/highway driving.

==== Charging ====
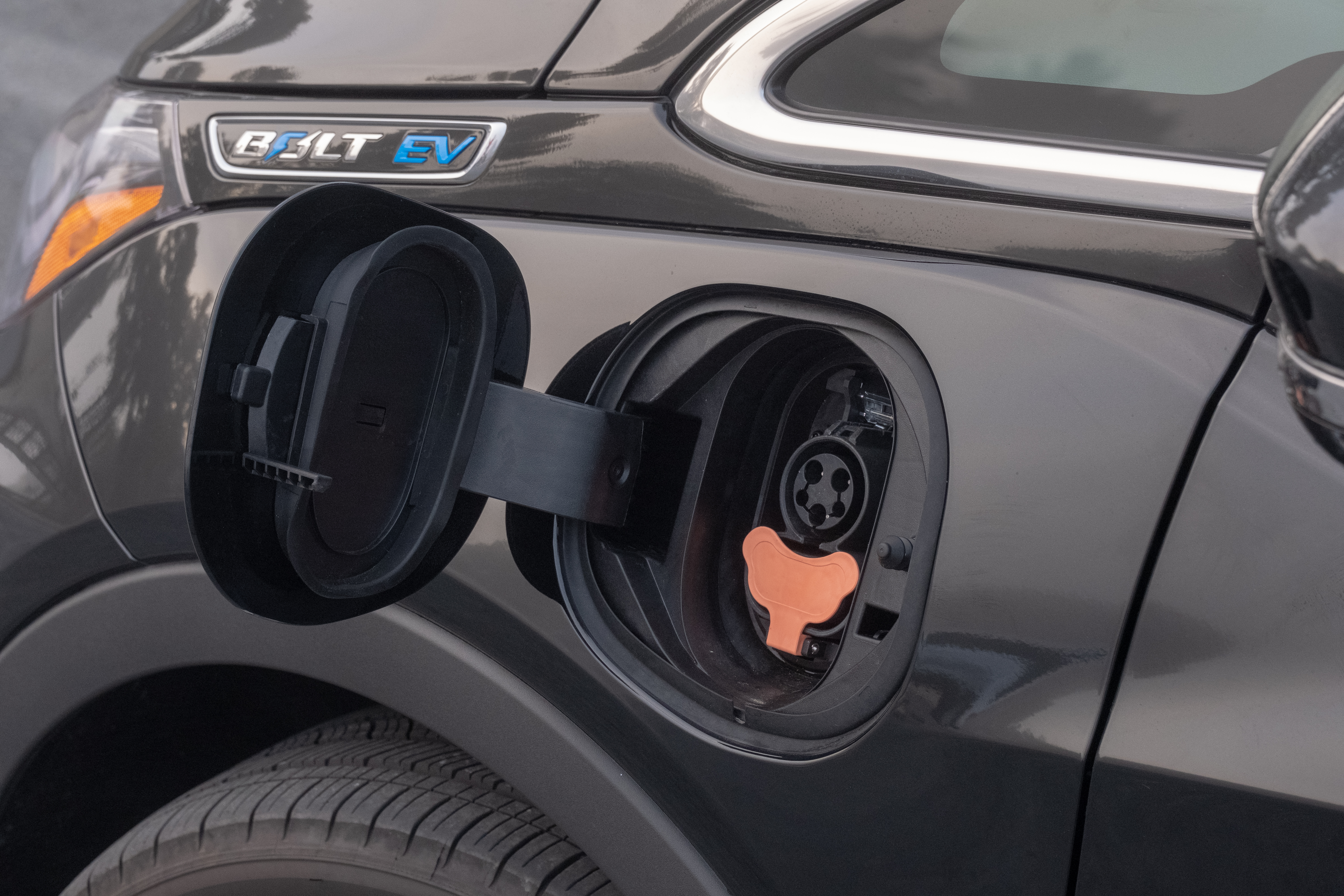
Open charging port next to front wheel, with an orange plastic cover over the DC pins of the CCS1 connector.

All models of Bolt support standard SAE J1772 EV charging plugs, at Level 1 or Level 2 (AC). DC fast charging via the CCS1 connector can be added as a factory option. For 2021 model year, the upper trim level ("Premier") was equipped with the CCS1 connector as standard. A portable Level 1 EVSE is supplied with each Bolt, stowed in a special compartment under the hatchback floor. It is UL Listed to operate at 120 VAC in the US market but is capable of operating at 240 VAC.

Level 1 (120 VAC) charging supplies roughly 1 kW and adds 3–5 miles (4.8–8.0 km) of range per hour of charging. Level 2 (240 VAC) charging supplies up to 7.2 kW and adds 20–30 miles (32–48 km) of range per hour of charging. The factory-option 55 kW SAE Combo DC fast charging system can add 150 miles (240 km) of range per hour. The Bolt user manual suggests fast-charging to only 80% charge to ensure consistent 50 kW charging. The fast charge rate steps down to 38 kW at 56% charge and again to 24 kW at 68% charge. Above 85%, the charge rate varies from 16 kW to 0 kW.

With the 2022 refresh, the on-board AC charger was upgraded to a maximum rate of 11.5 kW and the CCS1 connector was made standard, although DC fast charging remained limited to a maximum rate of 55 kW.

==== Tires ====
The Bolt EV is delivered with self-sealing tires whose interior surfaces are coated with a sticky compound to automatically seal small leaks and punctures in the tread area. There is no spare tire, nor is there a built-in place to store one. The car is equipped with a digital tire-pressure monitoring system to warn the driver if a tire is leaking, and a portable air compressor kit is supplied as an optional part. Under the rear hatchback cargo deck, there is a space that can be used to store an undersized spare, and some owners carry a compatible Chevrolet Cruze spare tire there.

==== Test drives ====
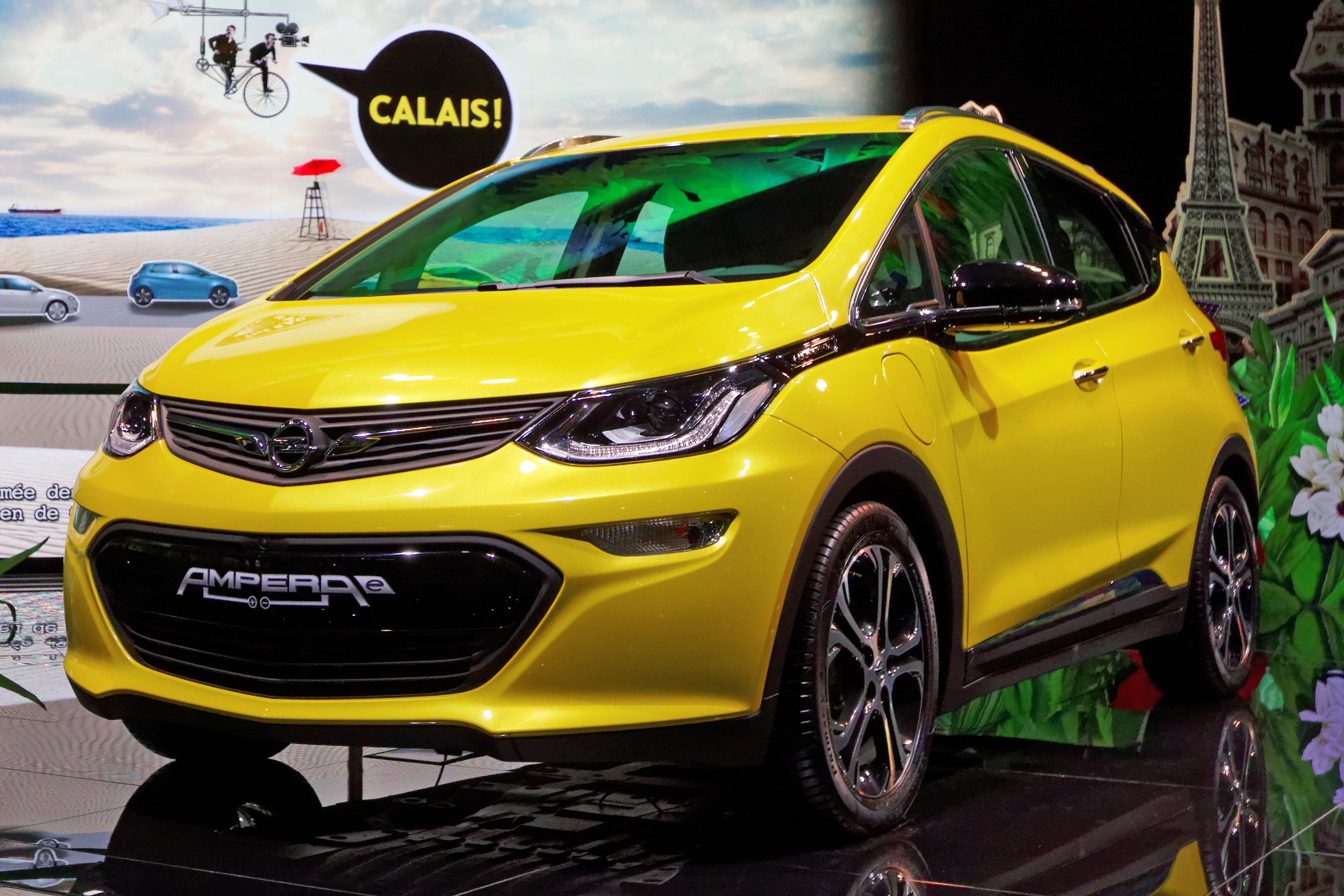
The production version of the Opel Ampera-e debuted at the 2016 Paris Motor Show.

The EPA-rated range of 238 miles (383 km) was confirmed by automotive reporters driving a preproduction Bolt with a 60-kWh battery. Driven under different driving modes with the air conditioning on, the trip between Monterey and Santa Barbara was completed with an energy consumption of 50.1 kWh, representing an average efficiency of 21.1 kWh/100 mi (160 mpg‑e; 13.1 kWh/100 km). A total of 237.8 miles (382.7 km) were driven, with the Bolt's display showing 34 miles (55 km) of range remaining. Several other journalists conducted a preproduction Bolt test drive on the same route, and all reported similar results regarding the Bolt EPA-estimated range.

As part of its debut at the 2016 Paris Motor Show, Opel reported driving an Ampera-e without recharging from Piccadilly Circus in London to Porte de Versailles in Paris, the venue of the exhibition. The rebadged Bolt traveled 259 miles (417 km) with 50 miles (80 km) of range remaining.

=== Markets and sales ===
Chevrolet Bolt / Opel Ampera-e sales numbers
Calendar year	US	Canada	South Korea	Brazil	Mexico	Europe
2017	23,876 (Note: 579 units sold in 2016 are included.)	2,122	570	0	10	1,918
2018	18,019	2,628	4,722	0	20	2,731
2019	16,418	4,050	4,037	7	27	2,510
2020	20,754	4,025	1,579	108	38	2,775
2021	22,073	4,668	1,016	132	18	115
2022	11,029	6,372	2,606	10	42	1
2023	23,164	14,075	1,876	60	146	
2024	8,414	1,152	13	14	18	–

=== United States ===
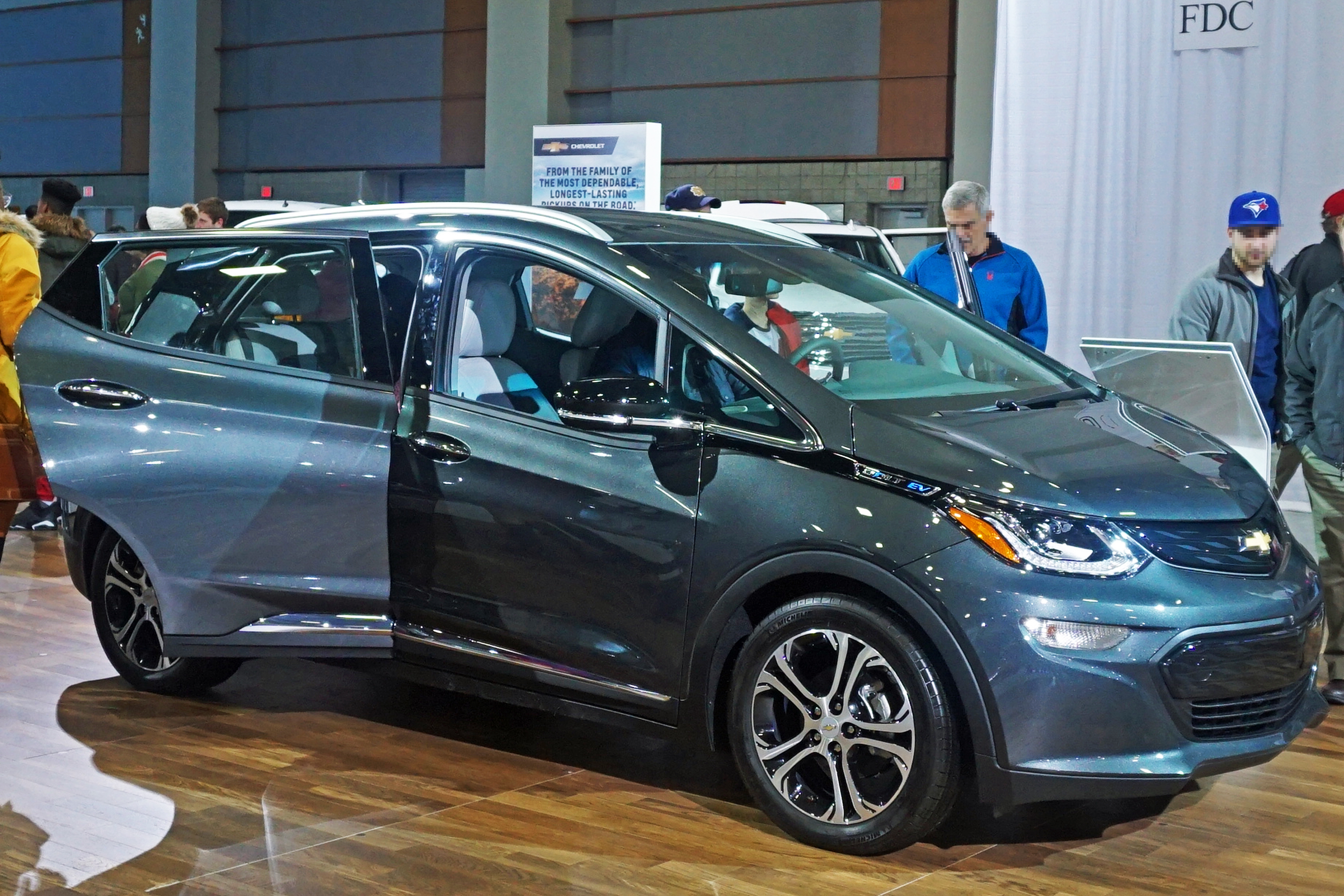
Deliveries of the Bolt EV began in the U.S. in December 2016.

Pre-production versions of the Bolt EV were built in March 2016 and sent to Cruise Automation, which modified them as test vehicles for autonomous driving. The modified pre-production vehicles were photographed in San Francisco in May.

Ordering began in California and Oregon in mid-October 2016. Production for the model year 2017 began in November 2016. The first three Bolts were delivered in the San Francisco Bay Area on December 13, 2016, and a total of 579 units were delivered in 2016. Availability was rolled out gradually across the United States, and by August 2017 the car was available nationwide.

To align production with demand, GM slowed production in July 2017. Subsequently, in the last months of 2017 Bolt demand rose rapidly; by October, it outsold any other model of electric car, including those from Tesla. Sales totaled 23,297 units in 2017, making the Bolt the U.S. second best selling plug-in car in 2017 after the Tesla Model S (≈26,500). In California, the Bolt listed as the top selling plug-in car with 13,487 units delivered, ahead of the much more expensive Tesla Model S, listed second with 11,813. The Bolt also led the state's subcompact segment in 2017, with a market share of 14.7% of all new cars sold in this category. As of February 2018, cumulative sales in the American market totaled 26,477 units.

In January 2019, GM reported that 2018 US sales for the Bolt totaled 18,019, down 22% from the previous year. (US sales of the Tesla Model 3, on the other hand, jumped from 1,764 in 2017 to 139,782 in 2018.) The combined sales of the Bolt and Volt also triggered the start of the full $7,500 tax credit phase out in Q4 2018, prompting the tax credit to reduce to $3,750 in April 2019 and $1,875 in October 2019 before disappearing entirely April 2020.

=== Canada ===
The Bolt has been available in Canada since the beginning of 2017. A total of 4,025 Bolt EVs were sold in Canada in 2020.

=== South Korea ===
In South Korea, General Motors opened the order books on March 18, 2017, and all 400 units of the first allotment were sold out in 2 hours.

=== European countries ===
The European version began production in February 2017.

The Ampera-e launch in the Norwegian market was scheduled for April 2017, when 13 were registered. Deliveries to retail customers began on May 17, 2017. Over 4,000 cars were ordered in Norway, with some to be delivered in 2018. Registrations totaled 1,121 units in 2017.

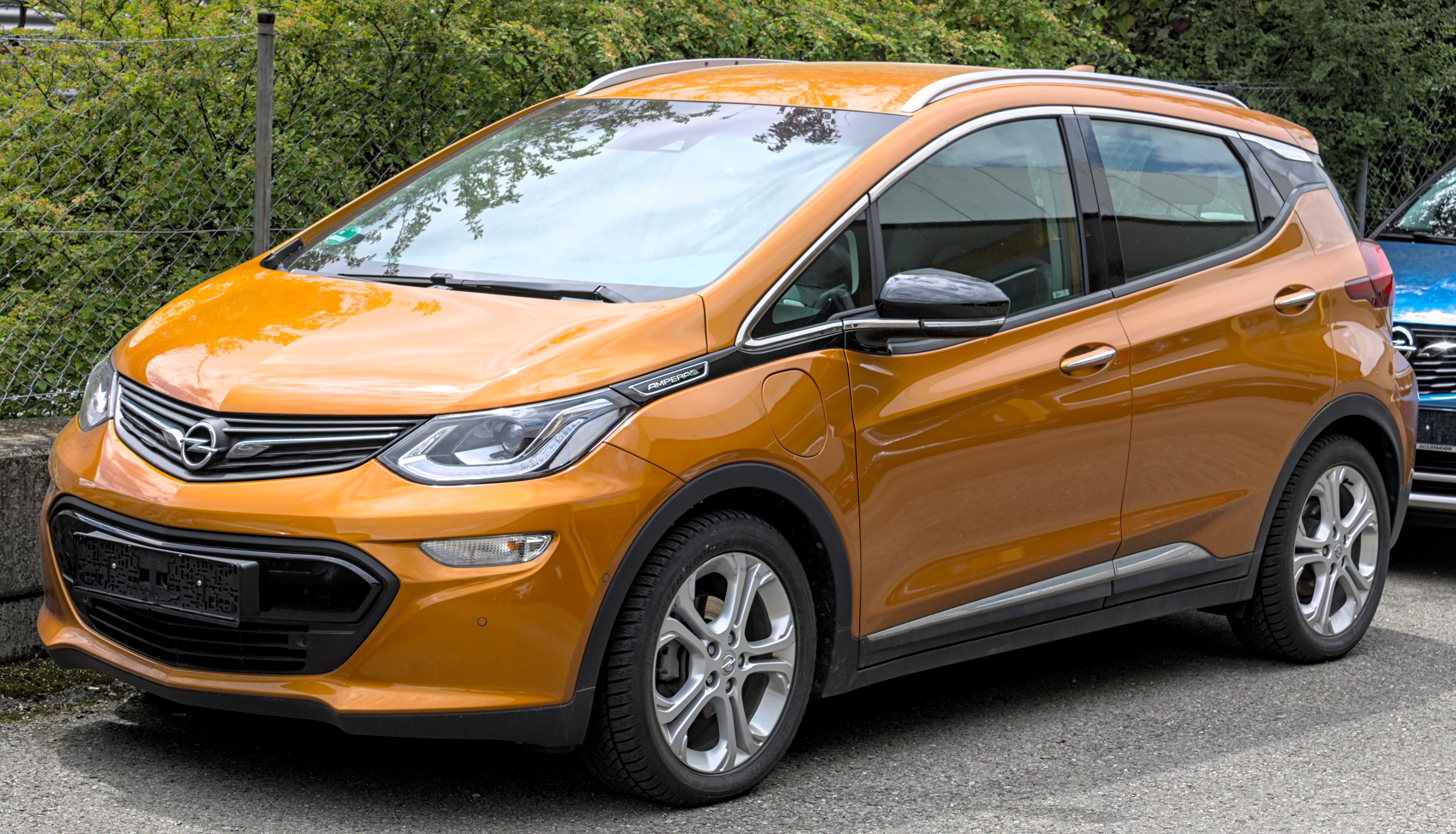
Opel Ampera-e (Germany)

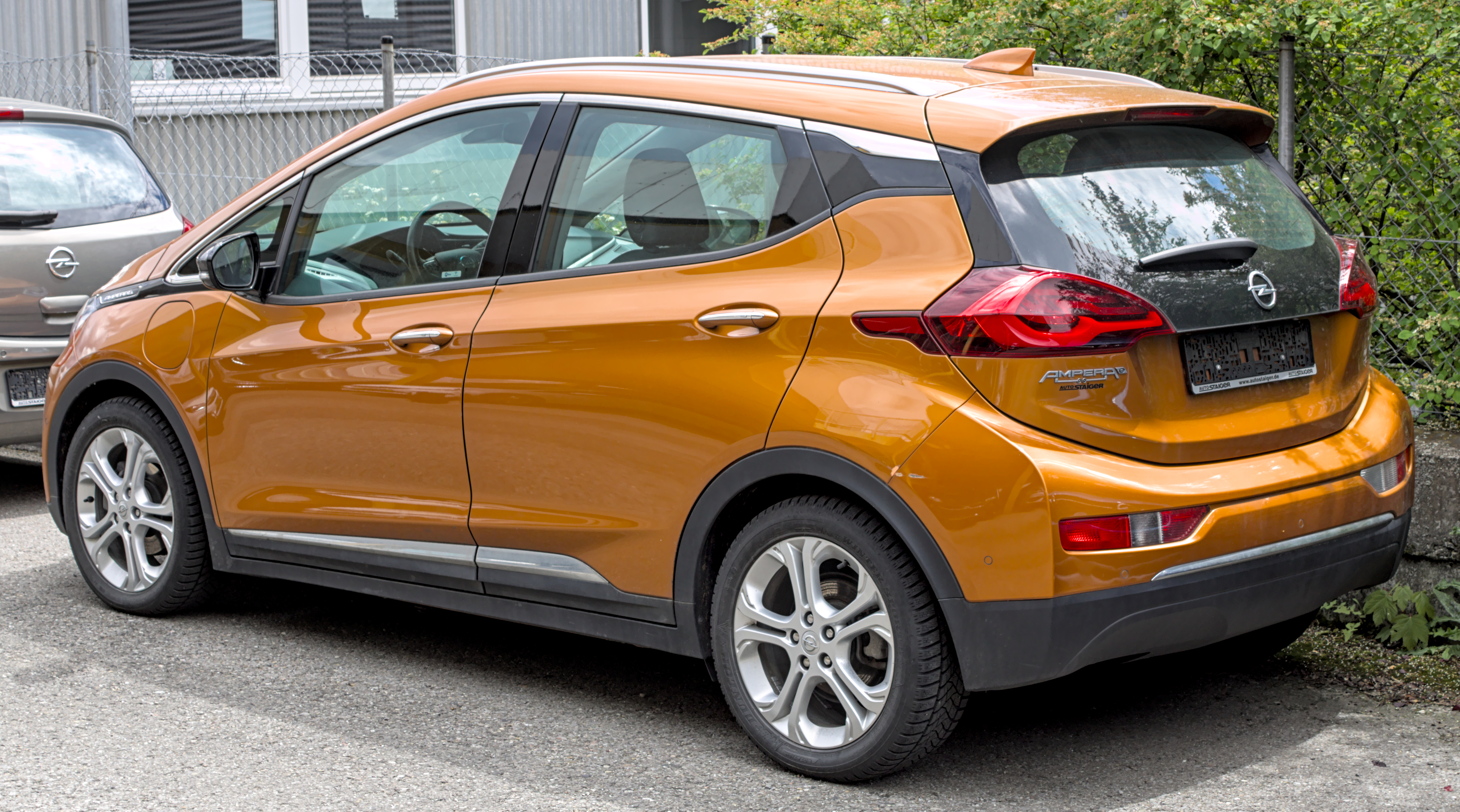
Rear view

==== European discontinuation controversy ====
The Ampera-e was first offered for sale in Norway, the first country in Europe where it was marketed, at a starting price of 299 900 kr (€33 500) in December 2016, higher than that of the Nissan Leaf and BMW i3. Availability was limited, as the Ampera-e and Bolt both were assembled at the same Orion Township factory. Three months later in March 2017, Groupe PSA agreed to acquire Opel, the English twin sister brand Vauxhall and the European auto lending business from General Motors as GM exited the European market; the acquisition was completed in November.

By October 2017, European sales had expanded into Switzerland, the Netherlands, and Germany; there were 4,000–5,000 orders for the Ampera-e in Norway alone, which has a population of 5.2 million. However, dealers in Europe were asked to completely stop accepting orders for the Opel Ampera-e at the same time, as the entire annual allotment for Europe had been sold and the earliest possible delivery date was pushed to 2019. The starting price was raised to €46 699 in November. The fact that Opel was limiting orders of the Ampera-e in Norway, its most promising market, led to speculation that GM was planning to discontinue the model in Europe. GM previously has been accused of purposefully sabotaging its EV1 programme, most notably in the 2006 documentary film Who Killed the Electric Car?.

In February 2018, it was reported that 1,971 Opel Ampera-e had been sold in Europe to date. Deliveries in Norway trickled at fewer than 100 units per month in 2018. For comparison, in 2018, the Hyundai Kona Electric, equipped with a 64 kWh battery and offering comparable range to the Ampera-e, was offered for sale in Norway. The entire yearly allotment, 2,500 vehicles, was sold out almost instantly.

In 2018, it was virtually impossible to order the car in Europe although in November 2018, it was reported to be on sale in the Netherlands for €46 699, possibly as a way to reduce overall emissions of the cars sold by Opel/Vauxhall. Sales records show that, as of February 2019, fewer than 5,000 Ampera-e vehicles were ever delivered in the entirety of Europe. Even though the Ampera-e could be ordered and bought in the Netherlands in 2019, its steep price was still an issue. In early 2020, the importer lowered the price to €34,149. This was enough to put the car in the top 10 of bestselling cars in the country (regardless of the powertrain), and make it #1 among electric cars. However, the 2020 price reduction was an incentive to sell the remaining stock; as of 2020, Opel refuses to import any more Bolt/Ampera-e into the Netherlands and Germany.

Opel/Vauxhall offered the Opel Crossland X, a gasoline- or diesel-powered crossover utility vehicle with styling mildly reminiscent of the Bolt, using a platform developed by Groupe PSA under a partnership with GM predating the acquisition. Under PSA, Opel/Vauxhall announced plans to offer EVs based on the Opel Corsa and the Peugeot 208, both being smaller cars than the Bolt. The Corsa-e went on sale in March 2020.

=== Awards and recognition ===
The Bolt won the 2017 Motor Trend Car of the Year award, the 2017 North American Car of the Year, the 2017 AutoGuide.com Reader's Choice Green Car of the Year, 2017 Popular Mechanics Automotive Excellence Awards Car of the Year and the Green Car Reports Best Car To Buy 2017. The Bolt also ended up Car & Driver's '10 Best Cars' list for 2017. The Chevy Bolt also won the 2017 Green Car of the Year awarded by the Green Car Journal. It was also named by Time among its list of 25 Best Inventions of 2016, and among Popular Science's 10 Greatest Automotive Innovations of 2016. The Bolt EV beat out the Cadillac CT6 and Jaguar XE to win the Detroit Free Press award for Car of the Year. Automobile included the Bolt in its 2017 All Star list.

== Chevrolet Bolt EUV ==
Chevrolet Bolt EUV
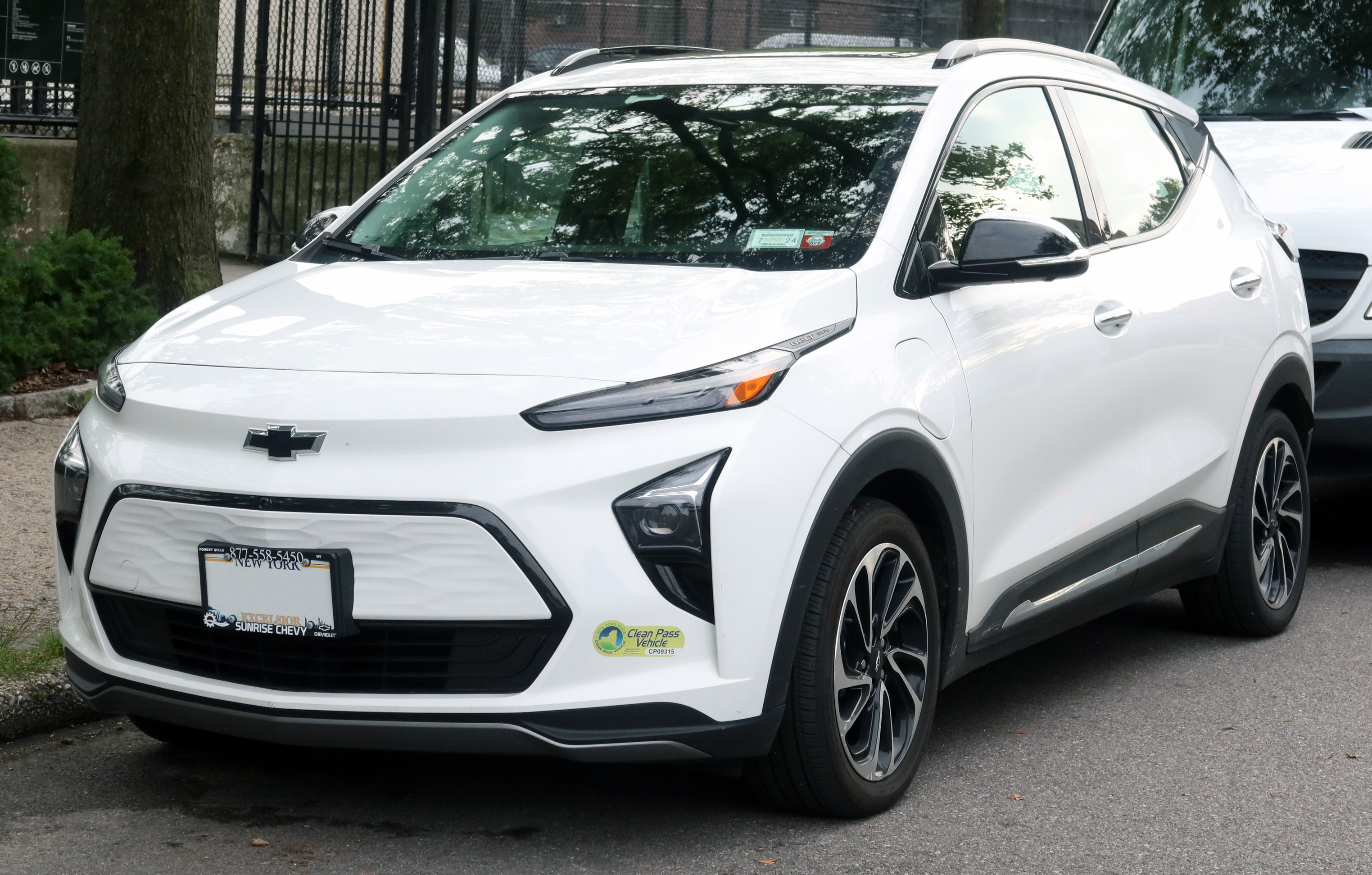

Overview
- Manufacturer: General Motors
- Production: May 2021 – November 2023
- Model years: 2022–2023
- Assembly: Final assembly: GM Orion Assembly, Lake Orion, Michigan; Battery/drivetrain, HVAC and instrument/infotainment systems: LG, Holland, Michigan & Hazel Park, Michigan

Body and chassis
- Class: Subcompact crossover SUV
- Body style: 5-door SUV
- Layout: Front-motor, front-wheel drive
- Platform: BEV II
- Related: Buick Velite 7; Chevrolet Bolt EV

Powertrain
- Electric motor: 200 hp (149 kW) permanent magnet motor/generator, torque 266 lb⋅ft (361 N⋅m)
- Transmission: 1-speed Electronic Precision Shift
- Battery: 65.0 kWh lithium-ion; 288 cells, 96 cell groups – three cells per group
- Electric range: 247 miles (398 km) (EPA method)
- Plug-in charging: 120–240 V AC, J1772, SAE Combo DC (CCS) Fast Charge

Dimensions
- Wheelbase: 105.3 in (2,675 mm)
- Length: 169.5 in (4,305 mm)
- Width: 69.7 in (1,770 mm)
- Height: 63.6 in (1,615 mm)
- Curb weight: 3,679 lb (1,669 kg)

Chronology
- Successor: Chevrolet Bolt (second generation)

=== Release ===
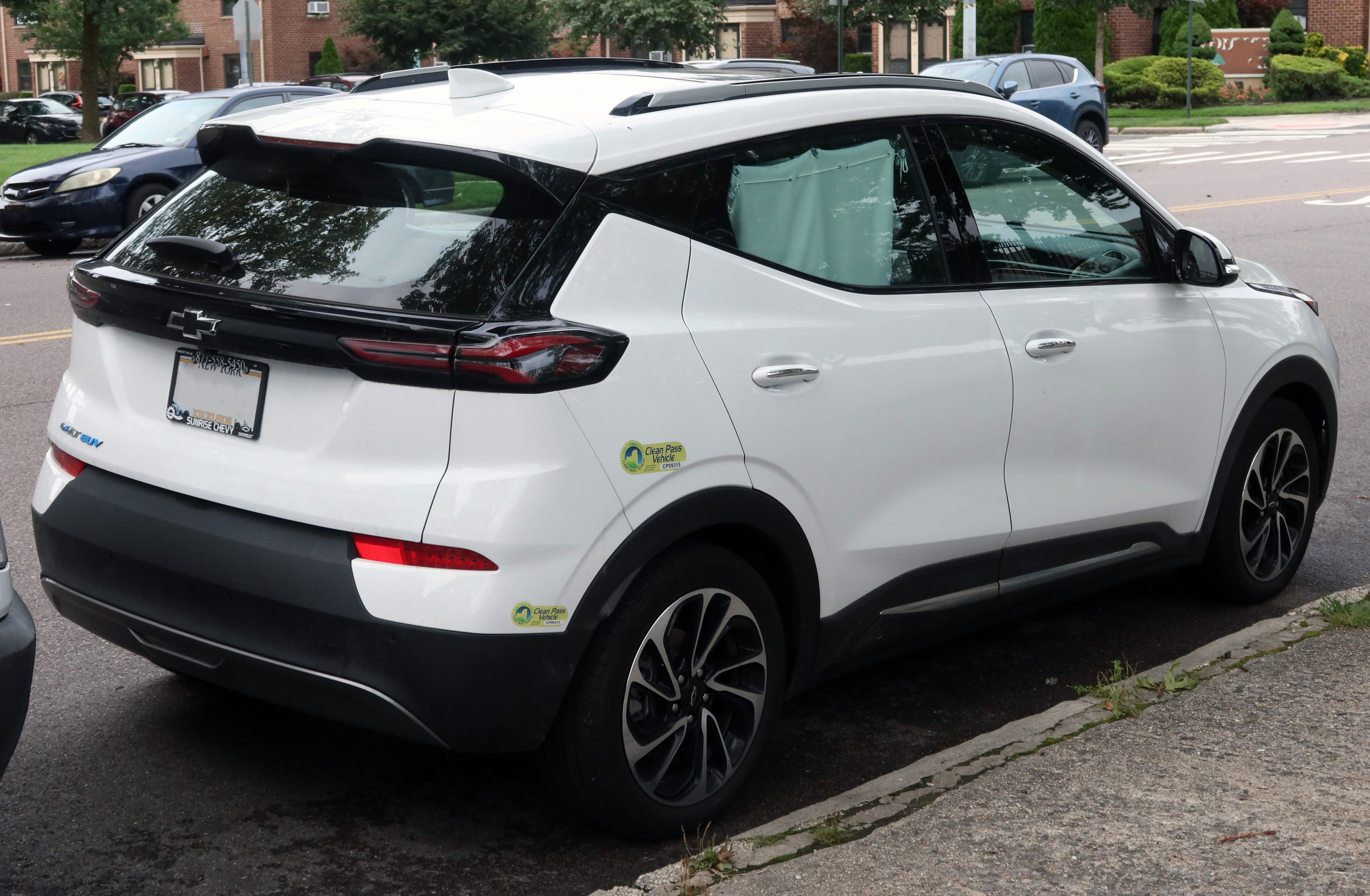
Rear view

The Bolt EUV was introduced in February 2021, and released to the Mexican market on August 17, 2021. As the first EUVs were arriving at dealerships in August 2021, all vehicles were recalled to replace the traction battery; Bolt EV and EUV production was paused from November 2021 to April 2022, and fewer than 400 Bolts (both EV and EUV) were delivered before April.

It is the first Chevrolet vehicle to receive the hands-free Super Cruise driver-assistance package.

Unlike early versions of the Bolt EV, the battery for the Bolt EUV is manufactured in the United States at LG plants in Michigan.

=== Pricing and trims ===
The Chevrolet Bolt EUV had 3 trim levels when introduced in 2022, beginning with LT, which started at $33,000. The next pricing rung was Premier at $37,500. Last, there was the "special, limited-production" Launch Edition at $43,495.

For the 2023 model year, only the LT and Premier trims were offered, at $28,795 and $33,295, respectively. For an additional $495, either trim level could get the Redline Edition appearance package, which was also offered on several other Chevrolet models.

=== Specifications ===
==== Range and efficiency ====
Under the U.S. Environmental Protection Agency (EPA) five-cycle test methodology, the Bolt EV fuel economy is rated at:

- 115 mpg‑e (29 kW⋅h/100 mi) miles per gallon gasoline equivalent for combined driving
- 125 mpg‑e (27 kW⋅h/100 mi) in city driving
- 104 mpg‑e (32 kW⋅h/100 mi) in highway driving

The Bolt EUV's EPA-rated range for:

- combined driving is 247 miles (398 km)
- city driving is 267 miles (430 km)
- highway driving is 223 miles (359 km)

==== Charging ====
The Bolt EUV can charge through the SAE J1772 connector using electric vehicle supply equipment connected to an AC power supply. A portable AC EVSE (made by Webasto) is included that can operate at Level 1 (8 or 12 amps) using the NEMA 5–15 dongle and Level 2 (32 amps) using the NEMA 14–50 dongle. A Level 1 charger supplying 120V at 8 amps adds around 2.8 miles (4.5 km) of range per hour, taking about 88 hours for a full charge. The maximum Level 1 charging rate at 12 amps, the average amperage of a North American household power outlet, adds around 4.0 miles (6.4 km) per hour, requiring approximately 62 hours for a complete charge. A Level 2 charger supplying 240V at 32 amps adds around 29 miles (47 km) per hour, taking about 9 hours to fully charge. The maximum Level 2 charging rate of 48 amps (11.5 kW) adds 44 miles (71 km) per hour, fully charging in about 6 hours.

The EUV is equipped with DC fast charging as standard, using a CCS Combo 1 plug with a maximum rate of 55 kW, and can add up to 95 miles (153 km) in the first 30 minutes.

==== Dimensions ====
The EUV has a wheelbase 2.9 in (74 mm) longer than the Bolt EV and is 6.3 in (160 mm) longer overall at 169.5 in (4,310 mm), increasing rear-seat legroom. The EPA interior volumes are 96.5 and 16.3 cu ft (2,733 and 462 L) for passenger and cargo space, respectively, which is slightly more, combined, than the Bolt EV. Although the cargo volume of the EUV is slightly smaller than the EV, this is due to the methodology of SAE J1100, the recommended practice used to compute volume; manufacturer testing demonstrated the EUV can hold more cargo.

The turning circle of the Bolt EUV is 38.3 ft (11.7 m), measured wall-to-wall.

==== Interior ====
The Super Cruise advanced driver-assistance system and a panoramic sunroof are available for the Bolt EUV; the Bolt EV lacks both options. The Premier trim adds heated and ventilated front seats. Rear legroom is about 3 inches more than the Bolt EV. Front headroom is slightly reduced with the sunroof.

=== Discontinuation ===
On April 25, 2023, GM CEO Mary Barra said that the Bolt and Bolt EUV would be discontinued at the end of 2023 to make room for GM's "new generation of electric vehicles." On July 25, 2023, GM announced it would continue production of the Bolt and will use Ultium and Ultifi technologies. It gave no details as to whether multiple body styles, such as the EUV, would return.

Production of the Bolt EUV ended on December 20, 2023.

A new version of the Bolt was to begin production in late 2025 for sale in mid-2026.

== Second generation (2026) ==
Second generation
- 2027 Chevrolet Bolt

Overview
- Production: January 2026–present
- Model years: 2027
- Assembly: United States: Kansas City, Kansas (Fairfax Assembly)

Body and chassis
- Platform: BEV II

Powertrain
- Electric motor: 210 hp (157 kW) permanent magnet motor/generator, 169 lb⋅ft (229 N⋅m) torque
- Battery: 65 kWh lithium iron phosphate
- Electric range: 262 miles (422 km) (EPA)
- Plug-in charging: NACS

Dimensions
- Wheelbase: 105.3 in (2,675 mm)
- Length: 169.6 in (4,308 mm)
- Width: 69.7 in (1,770 mm)
- Height: 63.9 in (1,623 mm)

Chronology
- Predecessor: Chevrolet Bolt EUV

A second generation Bolt was announced in December 2023, teased on July 30, 2025, and unveiled on October 9, 2025. Unlike the first generation, only the crossover body style of the Bolt EUV is offered for the second generation, and as a result the previously used "EV" and "EUV" suffixes are dropped.

The maximum charging speed on the second-generation Bolt has been increased to 150 kW, and GM claims a 10–80% charge time of 26 minutes. The 65 kWh battery pack now uses lithium iron phosphate chemistry, with an EPA-estimated range of 262 miles (422 km). The charging port was switched from CCS to NACS. Several parts are shared with the Equinox EV, including the sensor suite and the X76 permanent-magnet motor, which is slightly more powerful at 210 hp (157 kW), but has less torque than the 2023 models, at 169 lb⋅ft (229 N⋅m). A higher final drive reduction provides more torque at the wheels however. The car's weight increased by roughly 100 lb (45 kg) compared to the prior Bolt EUV. Like other Chevrolet EVs, Android Auto and Apple CarPlay were removed from the infotainment system. When used with a specific GM Home Energy charging station, the car has Vehicle-To-Home (V2H) capability and can supply power during a blackout.

The cars are manufactured at GM's Fairfax plant in Kansas. The battery cells are supplied by CATL.

Production has already been announced as terminating in mid-2027 after a planned 18 months of production.

== See also ==
- Chevrolet Spark EV
- General Motors EV1
- Government incentives for plug-in electric vehicles
- List of battery electric vehicles
- Plug-in electric vehicle
