= Cadillac Celestiq =

Battery electric full-size luxury car

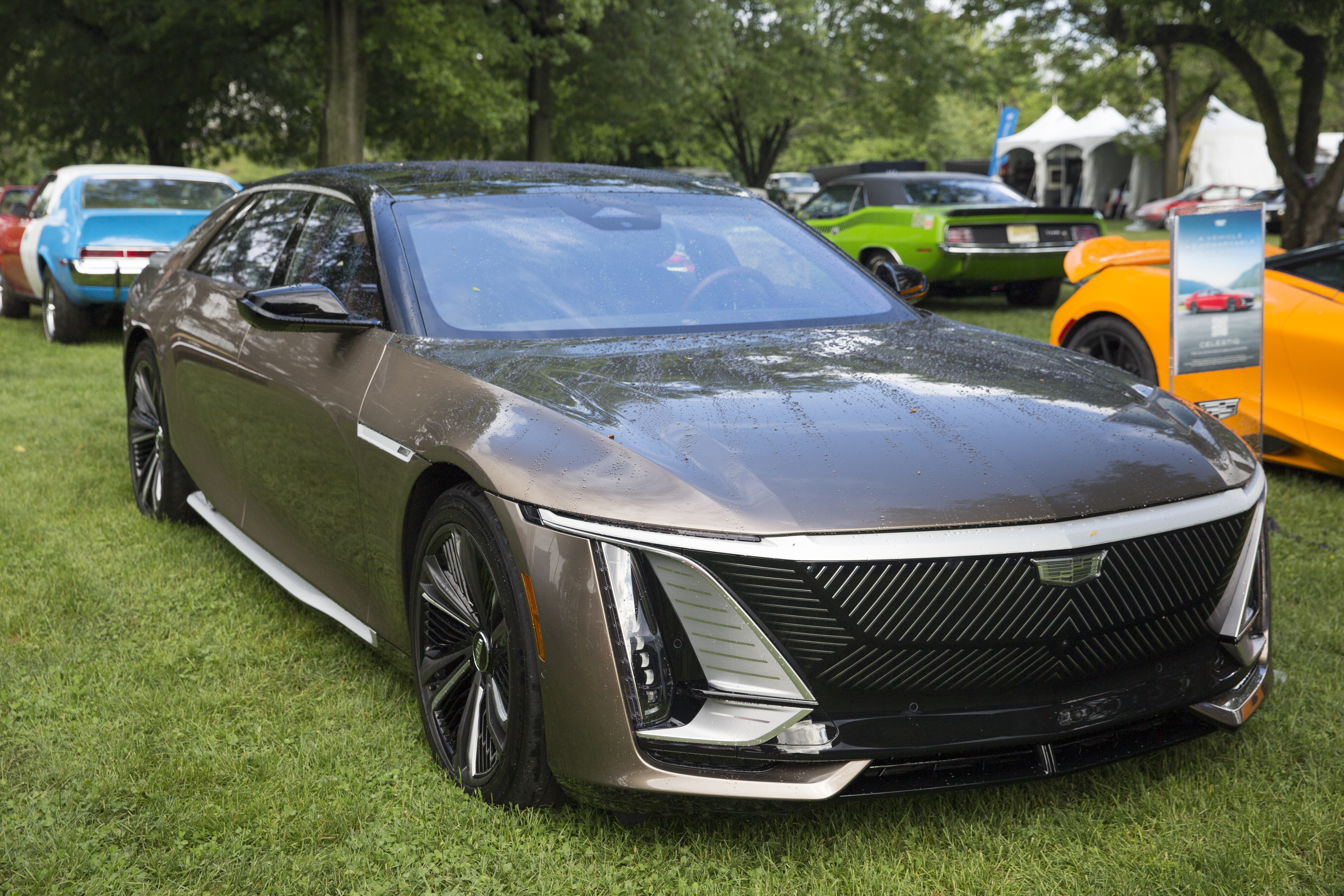
- 2025 Cadillac Celestiq

Overview
- Manufacturer: General Motors
- Production: January 2024 – present
- Assembly: United States: Warren, Michigan (Global Technical Center)
- Designer: Magalie Debellis

Body and chassis
- Class: Full-size luxury car
- Body style: 5-door liftback
- Layout: Dual-motor, four-wheel-drive
- Platform: GM BEV3
- Related: Cadillac Sollei

Powertrain
- Electric motor: 2 × permanent magnet synchronous
- Power output: 655 hp (488 kW; 664 PS)
- Battery: 111 kWh NCMA Ultium
- Electric range: 303 mi (488 km) (EPA)
- Plug-in charging: DC: 190 kW

Dimensions
- Wheelbase: 130.2 in (3,308 mm)
- Length: 217.2 in (5,517 mm)
- Width: 81.9 in (2,081 mm)
- Height: 57.2 in (1,453 mm)
- Curb weight: 6,839 lb (3,102 kg)

The Cadillac Celestiq (/səˈlɛstɪk/ se-LESS-tick) is a battery electric liftback made by the Cadillac division of General Motors. It is the brand's flagship sedan. Production commenced in 2024.

== Overview ==
Cadillac builds the Celestiq by hand, having invested US$81 million to create a low-volume production line at its Technical Center (GMTC) in Warren, Michigan.

Since it was completed in 1956, only concept and show cars have been assembled at GMTC. The Celestiq is the first vehicle sold to the public that was assembled at GMTC.

One of the vehicle's distinct features is its smart glass roof, manufactured by Research Frontiers. Other reported features include a dashboard-width touchscreen, all-wheel drive and four-wheel steering. It is expected to use more than a hundred 3D printed components. It is anticipated the Celestiq will be fitted with GM's next generation "Ultra Cruise" advanced driver-assistance system, running on Qualcomm's Snapdragon Ride platform.

Like the Cadillac Lyriq, an electric SUV which precedes it, the Celestiq uses GM's Ultium battery technology and BEV3 platform.

=== Concept ===
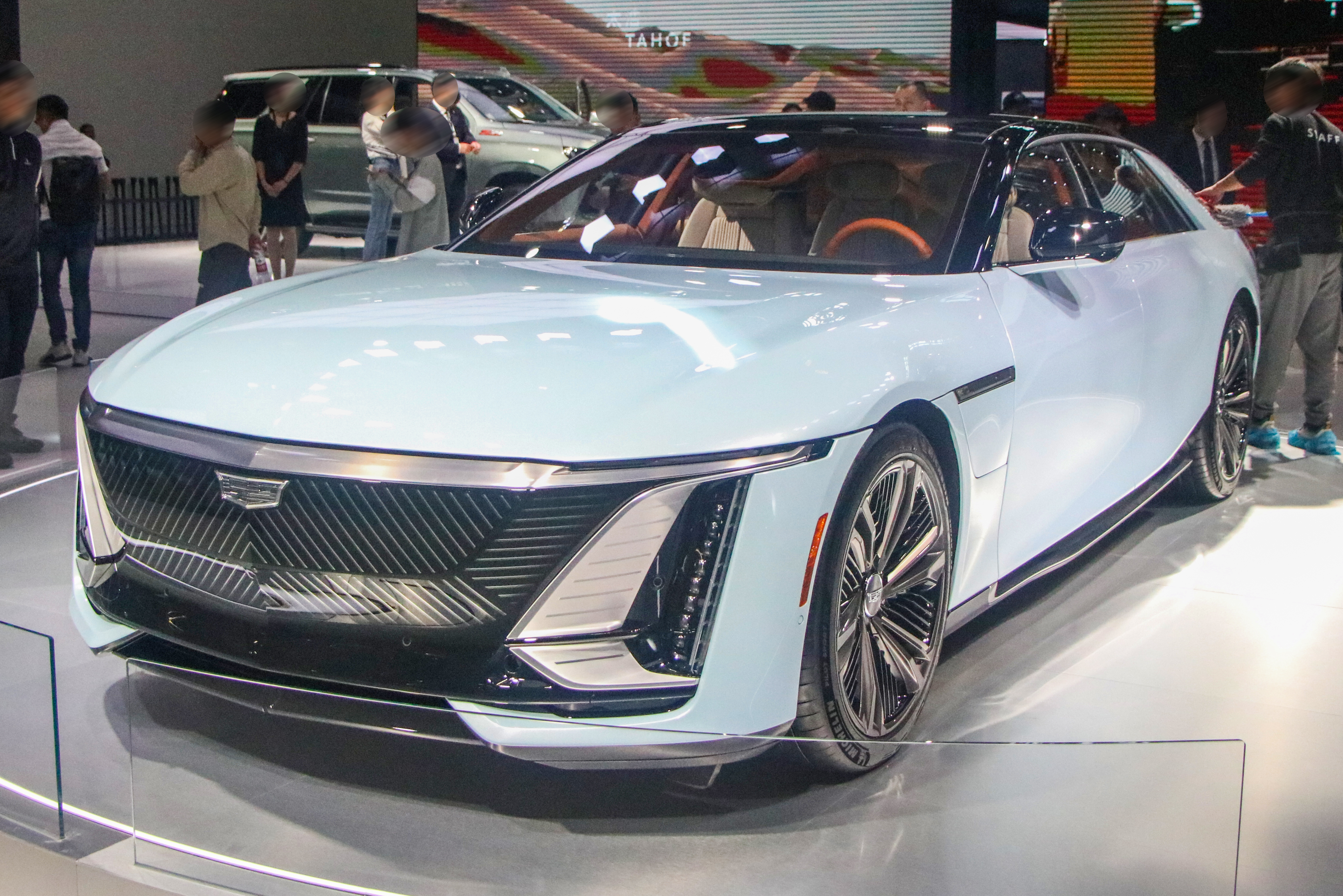
Concept model

The genesis for a flagship Cadillac sedan has been traced back to concept vehicles including the Sixteen (2003), Ciel (2011), Elmiraj (2013), and Escala (2016), with the last being approved for production prior to Cadillac's pivot to selling electric vehicles exclusively. The Escala was reworked as a halo car for the marque's electrification efforts instead, and the Celestiq concept was derived from it.

After a limited number of planned features and details were released in March 2020 and January 2021 at an "EV Day" event and CES 2021, respectively, pictures of the concept vehicle were not available until July 22, 2022, when Cadillac revealed the Celestiq Show Car, planned for release as a 2025 model year vehicle. The Wall Street Journal reported the Celestiq will be priced near US$300,000 and will enter limited production by late 2023, with fewer than 500 built per year. In 2025, the price was reported at US$340,000.

The designer of the Celestiq, Magalie Debellis, also was responsible for designing the Lyriq, and the two electric vehicles shared design elements such as the front grille and taillamps. Overall, the concept drew inspiration from earlier Cadillac models, including the 1957 Eldorado Brougham and 1930–40 Cadillac V-16, as well as the architecture of Eero Saarinen, who designed GMTC and the Gateway Arch.

The concept was shown to the public at Monterey Car Week in August 2022, including the annual Pebble Beach Concours d'Elegance. It was awarded for Best Concept and Best Use of Color, Graphics, or Materials at the EyesOn Design awards in September 2022.

=== Production ===
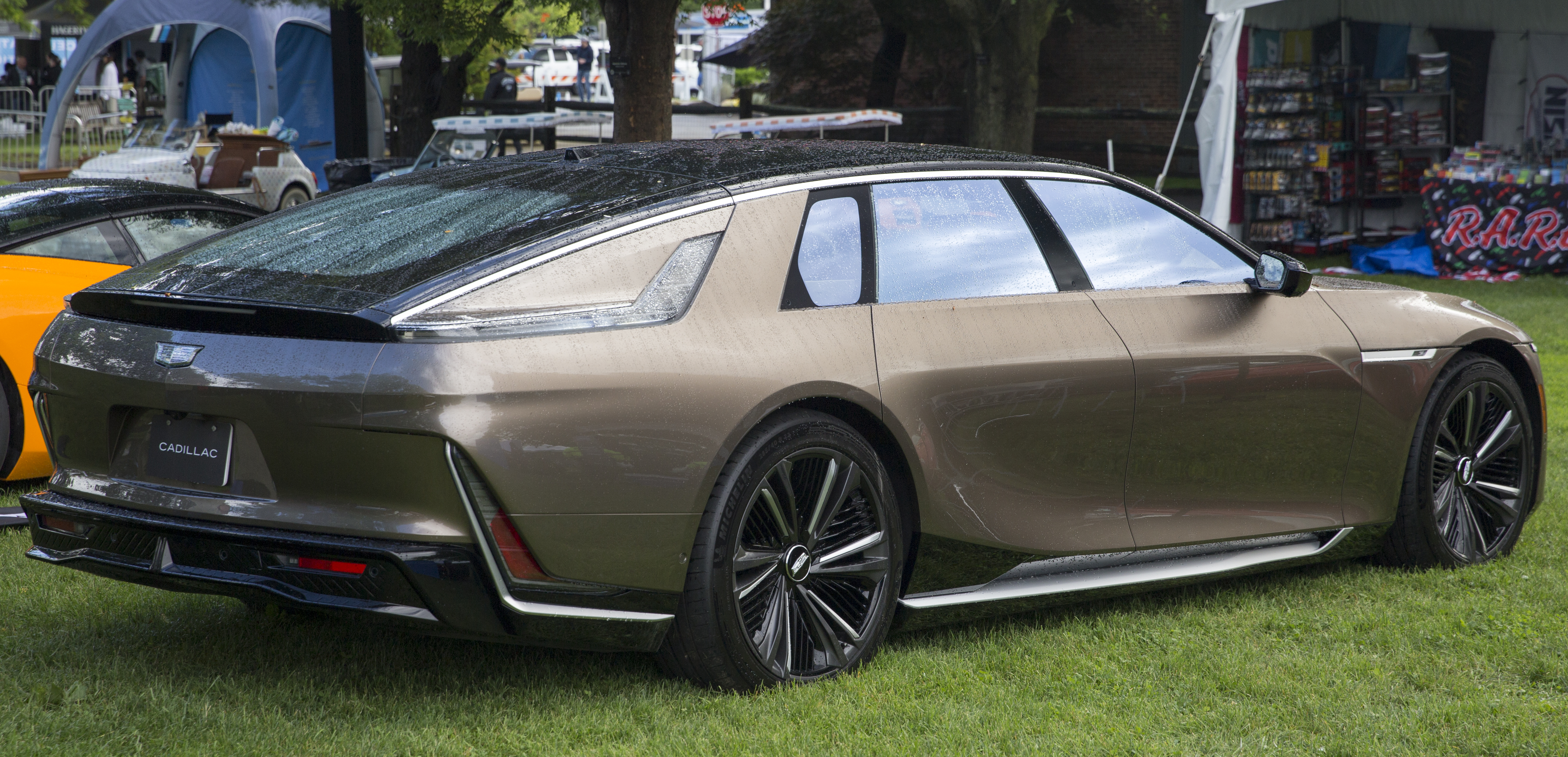
Rear view

At a press event on October 18, 2022, the production version of the Celestiq was introduced. It retained the overall design of the concept, with changes to the liftback design and the side-view cameras being replaced with conventional mirrors.

The planned low-volume production process allows GM to reduce the cost of production by using additive manufacturing processes and soft tooling for flexibility. The vehicle is assembled by hand. In some cases, the number of parts has been reduced to simplify assembly. For example, the main chassis is made from six large castings, manufactured in front/rear/central modules split left/right and welded together. It is estimated that GM invested $81 million to create the Celestiq production line. Many of the parts are 3D printed aluminum, titanium or stainless steel.

Camouflaged prototypes were spotted in June 2023 while undergoing road testing in Michigan. The car was exhibited again at Monterey Car Week in August 2023 and 2024, when final engineering validation vehicles were tested and demonstrated for the automotive press. Initial deliveries were expected to begin in the fourth quarter of that year; one year of production has already been sold.

The first Celestiq was delivered to a customer in June 2025. The delivery took place at the Cadillac House at Vanderbilt, a facility at the GM Global Technical Center in Warren, Michigan, where customers can order and customize a Celestiq one-on-one with an advisor.

== Specifications ==
=== Powertrain and battery ===
The Celestiq is all-wheel drive, using two electric traction motors, one each for the front and rear axle. They deliver a combined output of 655 hp (488 kW) and 646 lb⋅ft (876 N⋅m) of torque, with an estimated acceleration of 0–60 mph (97 km/h) in 3.7 seconds. The motors draw from a high-voltage Ultium traction battery with a total capacity of 111 kWh. The battery is composed of individual pouch cells laid horizontally in stacks of varying heights; under the footwells, for instance, the cells are stacked six high, while under the seats, the cells are stacked nine to twelve high. It can be recharged at rates of up to 200 kW (DC). Estimated range is 303 mi (488 km).

=== Chassis ===
The Celestiq is built on the General Motors BEV3 platform using an aluminum spaceframe with carbon fiber body panels; the door panels are sheet molded composite (SMC) to accommodate embedded sensors. The multilink adaptive air suspension has magnetorheological dampers and the rear wheels are steerable.

=== Lighting ===
The headlamps use digital micromirror devices with 1.3 million pixels per side, displaying a startup sequence to welcome the approaching driver, including a projection of the updated Cadillac crest.

=== Interior ===
The vehicle has a Dolby Atmos 38-speaker sound system and a four-quadrant smart glass roof which allows each area to have its own modification of the roof's opacity.

=== Customization ===
Many aspects of the car will be customizable, including exterior and interior colors, trim materials, and finishes. As a starting point, Cadillac offers four "Design Inspiration" themes: Magnetic (dark black and blue colors inside and out), Vale (earth tones), Mist (silver exterior with brown leather seats), and Aurora (sporty red themes). Prospective clients are invited to collaborate on the design with a concierge at Cadillac House at Vanderbilt, a building on the GMTC campus designed by Saarinen and named for Suzanne Vanderbilt, a Cadillac designer between 1955 and 1977 who was responsible for the 1958 Eldorado Seville coupe "Baroness" and 1958 Series 62 "Saxony" convertible.

== See also ==
- Cadillac Sollei
