= Ariel Atom =

Sports car

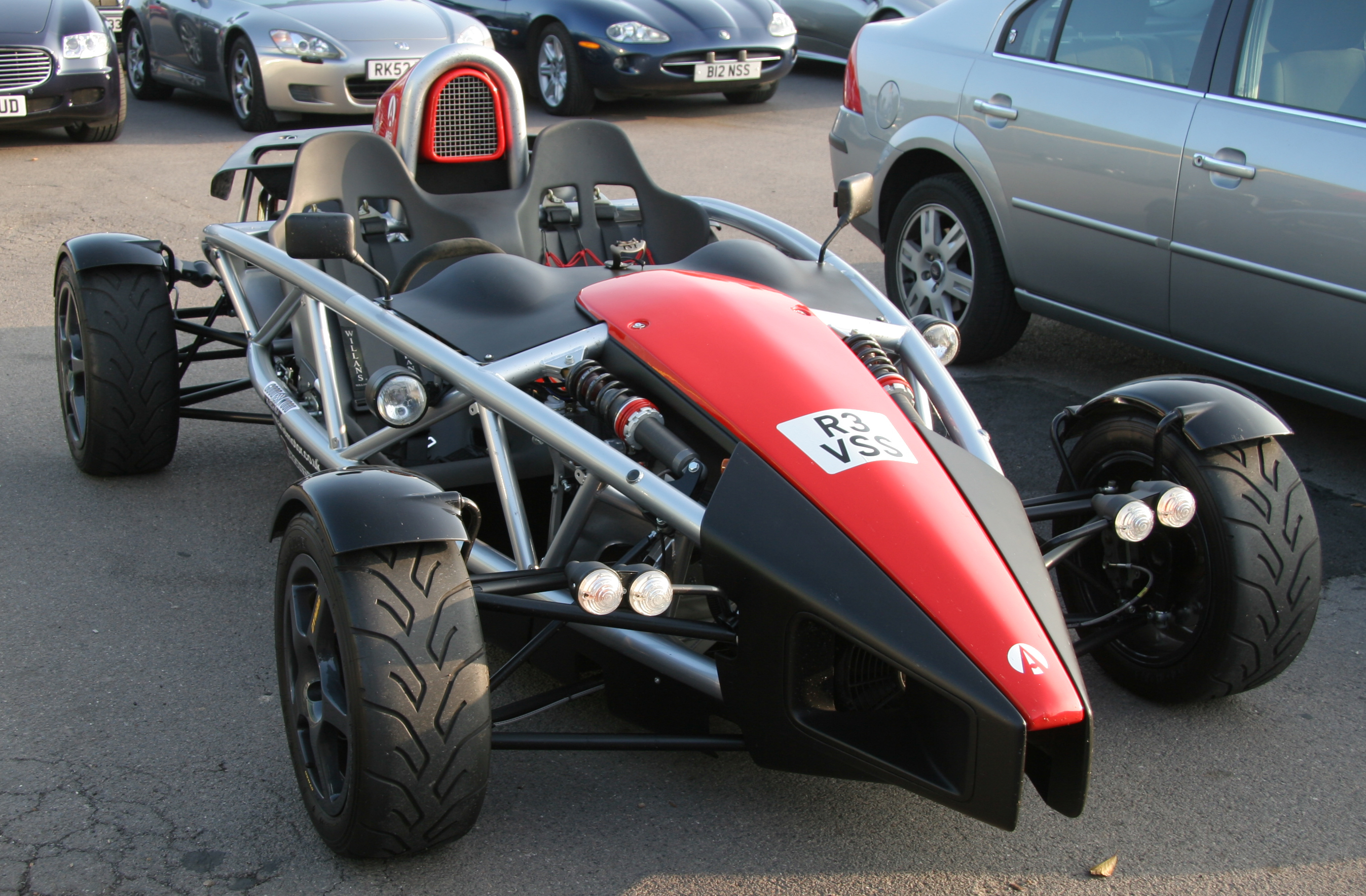

Overview
- Manufacturer: Ariel Motor Company
- Production: 2000–present
- Designer: Niki Smart

Body and chassis
- Class: Sports car (S)
- Body style: Open-wheel two-seater

Powertrain
- Engine: 1.8 L 190 hp Rover K-Series engine; 2.0 L 245 bhp naturally aspirated or 310 bhp (350 bhp in 3.5R) supercharged Honda K20Z4 i-VTEC; 2.2 L or 2.4 L 205-300 bhp supercharged General Motors Ecotec; 3.0 L 500 bhp Ariel H1 V8; 2.4 L 245 bhp naturally aspirated or 300bhp supercharged Honda i-VTEC (US); 2.4 L 230 bhp naturally aspirated or 365 bhp turbocharged Honda K24Z7 i-VTEC; 2.0 L 321 bhp turbocharged (direct injection) Honda K20C1 i-VTEC
- Transmission: 6-speed manual; 6-speed sequential manual

Dimensions
- Wheelbase: 2,345 mm (92.3 in)
- Length: 3,410 mm (134 in)
- Width: 1,890 mm (74 in)
- Height: 1,195 mm (47.0 in)
- Kerb weight: 612 kg (1,349 lb)

The Ariel Atom is a road-legal high-performance open-wheel car made by the Ariel Motor Company based in Crewkerne, Somerset, England, and under license in North America by TMI Autotech, Inc. at Virginia International Raceway in Alton, Virginia.

There have been eight Ariel Atom generations to date: Ariel Atom, Ariel Atom 2, Ariel Atom 3 (including the Ariel Atom 3 Mugen Limited Edition and Honda Racing Edition – of which only one was made), Ariel Atom 3.5, Ariel Atom 3S, Ariel Spec: Race Atom, Ariel Atom 500 V8 Limited Edition (only 25 to be made), and the Ariel Atom 4. The limited production Ariel Atom 500 V8 featured a 373 kW (500 bhp; 507 PS) V8 engine. The Ariel Atom 4 uses a turbocharged 2.0-litre engine, also used in the Honda Civic Type R, with 3-stage boost.

The Ariel Atom features a prominently visible chassis (i.e., an exoskeleton, no roof or windows, a small optional windscreen) and a drag coefficient of 0.40.

== Design origins ==
The Atom began as a student project by Coventry University transport design student Niki Smart together with Simon Saunders, a senior transport design lecturer. After several sports car companies rejected his proposal, Saunders founded his own company in 1991 named Solocrest Ltd. to create the Atom, which was renamed in 1999 as Ariel Motor Company Ltd.

Known then as the LSC (Lightweight Sports Car), the car was developed at the university in 1996 with input and funding from various automotive industry members, including British Steel and TWR. Simon Saunders' responsibility for the project was primarily as financial manager and design critic for Smart. The car was first shown publicly at the British International Motor Show at the NEC in Birmingham in October 1996.

== Suspension ==
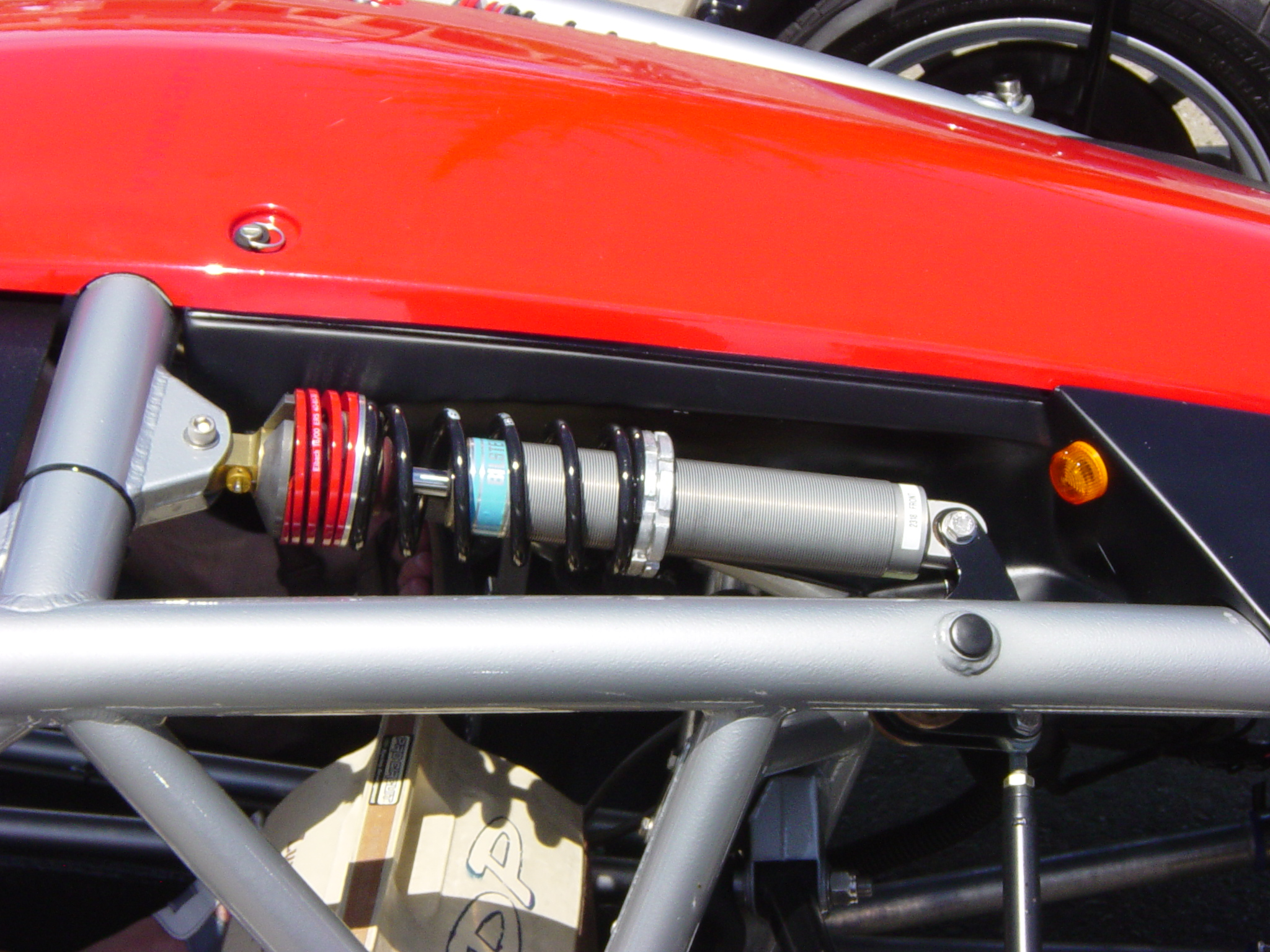
Front spring, helper coil spring (in red), and shock

The Atom's suspension setup was tuned by the engineers at Lotus. Edmunds "Inside Line" noted that "anyone who has driven a selection of Lotus-tuned cars, such as the Lotus Elise, the Aston Martin Vanquish and the Opel Speedster, will notice a common feel or signature, and it's replicated in the Atom."

The Atom's suspension derives from single-seater racing cars and is fully adjustable, requiring only a spanner. It uses both front and rear double unequal length wishbones and inboard, pushrod-operated dampers. Adjustable suspension rod ends feature inboard rubber/metal bushings to promote a more comfortable road-going ride. The front and rear Bilstein dampers are also adjustable. Stacked helper coil springs and main coil springs produce a low spring rate for minor deflections and a higher rate for large ones.

== Acceleration ==
Ariel Atom 3 engine
Audio of Ariel Atom 3 pulling away from the start at the Goodwood Festival of Speed hillclimb

In 2005, Road & Track magazine published the results of a comprehensive test of a range of cars, from the Porsche 911 Carrera S, Ford GT, BMW M5 to the Caterham CSR 260. The supercharged Ariel Atom 2 won the 0–161–0 km/h (0–100–0 mph) test by a clear margin at 10.88 seconds, ahead of the Caterham CSR 260 (11.41) and the Ford GT in fourth (13.17).

The following year, the Atom won Autocar's 0–100 mph challenge as the new Ariel Atom 2 300 bhp supercharged edition achieved a time of 6.86 seconds, and then stopped from 100 in 3.8 seconds. At the National Exhibition Centre in Birmingham, the Atom broke the indoor speed record. The high gloss floor that the cars ran on was only 220 m (720 ft) long, with an open door at the end of the hall. The driver of the Atom launched in fourth gear and still had wheelspin until the car reached 110 km/h (68 mph) and started to get traction. The Atom was beaten only by a class nine Autograss car powered by a 2.0 L Lexus-Toyota touring car engine which set the official indoor speed record, beating the previous record held by a Toyota F1 car driven by Toyota's test driver Olivier Panis dressed as Top Gear's driver The Stig.

In 2005, The Sunday Times measured the time taken for the Atom to accelerate from 0 to 97 km/h (60 mph) at 2.89 seconds, making it the world's third-fastest accelerating production car then available, after the Bugatti Veyron's 2.46 seconds and the Ultima GTR at 2.6 seconds;

== United States licensing ==
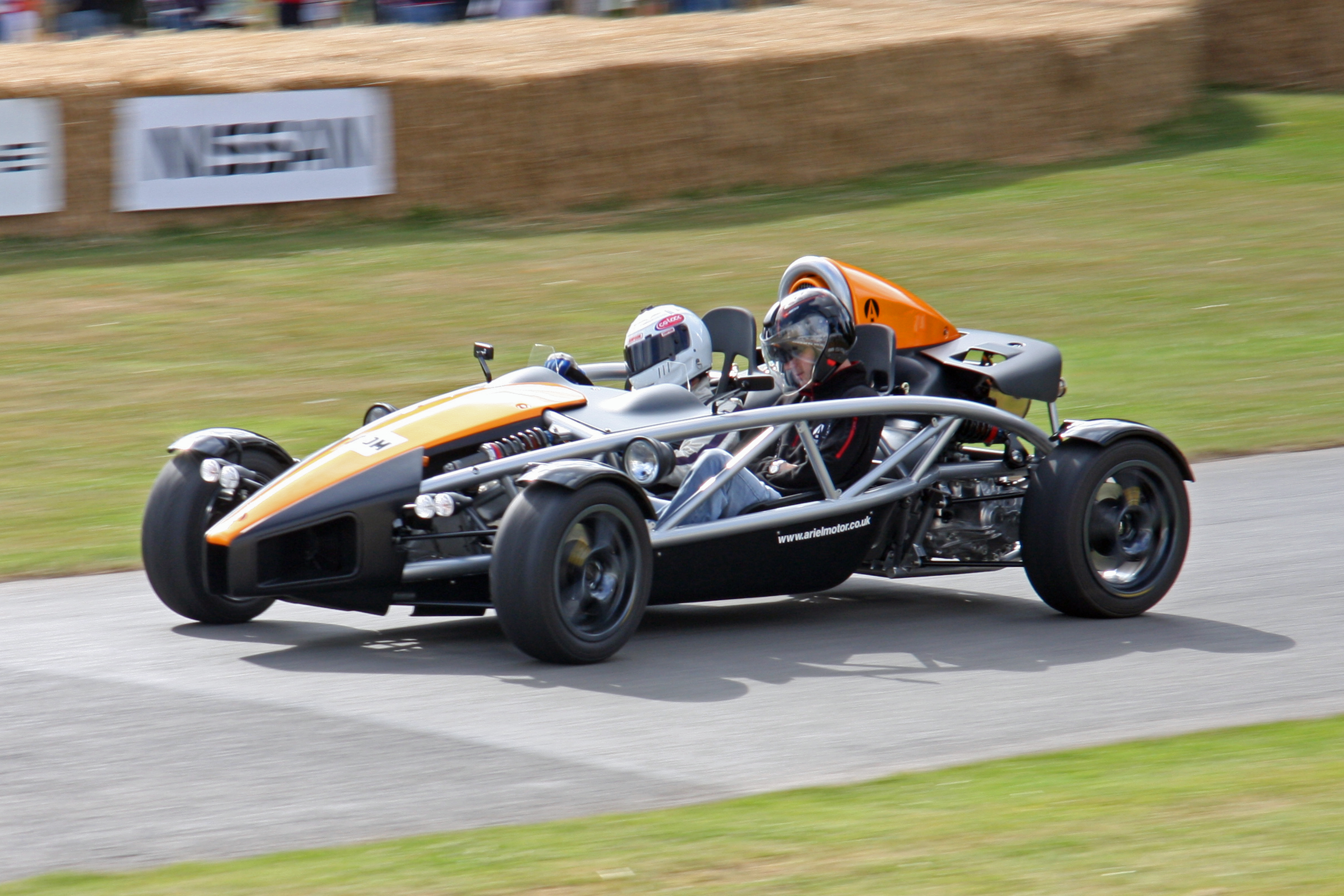
Ariel Atom 3

Brammo Motorsports of Ashland, Oregon, signed a deal with Ariel, Ltd to manufacture the Ariel Atom in the US, starting in late 2005. In the US the Atom 2 was available with the supercharged GM Ecotec engine, which was introduced in 2004 on the Saturn ION Red Line and is also used in the Chevrolet Cobalt SS. There was a limited run of 10 US-built Atom 2 cars in 2006–2007, which were powered by imported Honda K20As. Brammo ceased production of the Atom in 2007 to focus on the manufacture of an electric motorcycle.

In January 2008, it was officially announced that licensed manufacturing of the new Ariel Atom 3, for the US market, would be undertaken by specialty motorsports manufacturing company TMI AutoTech Inc at a purpose-built facility at Virginia International Raceway (VIR). Since 2008, all Atom 3 cars were powered by a Honda Civic Si drivetrain. In January 2016, TMI moved from its 20,000 ft/sq facility at VIR to a newly refurbished 60,000-square-foot (5,600 m^{2}) building in South Boston, VA. To separate Ariel manufacturing from its thriving sublet manufacturing services, TMI started all Ariel brand manufacturing and marketing efforts under the Ariel North America name.

In 2011, VIR started the VIR Cup in which specialty designed track dedicated Ariel Atoms would compete in a series of races. This specially designed Atom was called the Spec:RaceAtom (SRA). The VIR Cup was managed and operated by the track club while TMI offered technical support for the race cars, the VIR Cup ended in late 2015.

== Generations and variants ==
=== Ariel Atom ===
The first Atom arrived just in time for the new millennium with 190bhp from a naturally-aspirated 1.8-litre Rover K-series engine.

=== Ariel Atom 2 ===
Launched in 2003, the Atom 2 that followed had as much as 300bhp courtesy of a new supercharged 2-litre Honda Civic Type R (for the 220) and Type-S (for the 160) engine.

=== Ariel Atom 3 ===
The Atom 3 appeared in 2007, utilizing a new Honda Civic drivetrain and a smoother "KZ" Type-R motor.

=== Ariel Atom 500 ===
Introduced in February 2008, the Ariel Atom 500 features a 373 kW (500 hp) 3.0-litre John Hartley-designed V8 engine, carbon-fibre body panels and aerofoils, chromoly aerofoil wishbones, an integrated function steering wheel, Alcon four-piston brake calipers, and Dymag magnesium wheels. The engine weighs 90 kg (198 lb) and is coupled to a SADEV six-speed sequential gearbox to cope with the increased power over the Honda unit. During the development process, the RS performance engine was replaced by a unit prepared by Hartley Enterprises giving the final production version of the 550 kg (1,213 lb) car 678 kW/t (909 bhp/tonne).

Ariel claims this variant will accelerate from 0–100 km/h (62 mph) in less than 2.3 seconds, which made it the fastest accelerating production car when initially released.

On 23 January 2011, the Atom 500 set the lap record around the Top Gear test track, with a time of 1:15.1, making it the fastest road-legal car to go around the track – a record that stood for just over two years, until the Pagani Huayra completed a lap in 1:13.8 on 27 January 2013.

=== Ariel Atom 3.5R ===
The Ariel Atom 3.5R is the upgraded version of the Ariel Atom producing 261 kW from a 1,998cc supercharged Honda engine which propels the 550 kg car to 100 km/h in 2.6 seconds and to a top speed of 249.45 km/h. In June 2014 a 3.5R was presented to Avon and Somerset Police, the force local to the Crewkerne factory, to support a local motorcycle safety initiative. It has pursuit lights and police livery.

=== Ariel Atom 3S ===
In October 2014, TMI AutoTech, Inc. announced the arrival of an all new Atom for the US market, the 3S. This turbocharged upgrade to the Ariel Atom 3 produces 365 hp (272 kW) and over 300 ft lb (407 Nm) of torque, propelling it to 60 mph in 2.6 seconds (100 km/h in under 2.8 seconds).

Featuring an all-new cockpit-adjustable traction control system, JRi adjustable dampers, and a choice of three transmissions (including a new SADEV 6-speed sequential race inspired gearbox with paddle shifters), each Ariel Atom 3S is hand built by TMI AutoTech at their facility at Virginia International Raceway.

=== Ariel Atom 4 ===
The Ariel Atom 4 was launched at the Goodwood Festival of Speed in July 2018. It featured the latest Honda Type R turbocharged engine with 239 kW (321 bhp) as standard. It also featured a new chassis, suspension, steering, brakes, bodywork with significant aerodynamic improvements, new seating and instrumentation. and a host of design improvements and changes. The new car also features a thicker frame, separate seats and a revised intake. The car has been reviewed by Autocar and deliveries started at the start of June 2019. In 2020, Autocar selected the Ariel Atom 4 as Britain's Best Driver's Car.

=== Wrightspeed X1 ===
The Ariel Atom was unofficially used by Wrightspeed as the base of a one-off prototype called the Wrightspeed X1, which is a proof of concept of the company's all-electric powertrain.

== Atom Cup ==
In mid-2012, it was announced that for the first time in the UK, the Atom would have a dedicated single-make race series called Atom Cup. The series would feature on Jonathan Palmer's MSVR programme of racing with eight race weekends featuring 16 races. The cars were 183 kW naturally aspirated, 3.5 chassis with an MSA approved welded roll bar protection system. The standard suspension was replaced with Öhlins racing suspension. An FIA approved fire extinguisher system was also installed.

== See also ==
- BAC Mono
- Caterham Cars
- Drakan Spyder
- KTM X-Bow
- Radical Sportscars
