= Magalie Debellis =

French artist and industrial designer

- Born: France
- Education: Strate School of Design
- Occupation: Artist, Designer
- Years active: 2006–present

Magalie Debellis is an artist and industrial designer who works for General Motors as the design director of Corvette, Performance, Cars, and Crossovers exteriors at Chevrolet; previously, as the manager of Cadillac Advanced Design, she led the teams responsible for the styling of the Cadillac Lyriq and Celestiq.

== Personal life and education ==
In 2006, Debellis earned a master's degree in industrial design at the Strate School of Design in Sèvres, a suburb of Paris.

== Career ==
According to Debellis, her creative process starts by building a mood board with the design team to set the overall theme. As an industrial designer, she aims to balance form and function; her specialty is the exterior design profile.

Debellis was part of the GM design teams that styled the Chevrolet Corvette (C7) and sixth-generation Camaro. Following that work, she has led the design of Cadillac as it electrifies its lineup; the marque is piloting the overall electrification of GM. Cadillac's first electric vehicle is the Lyriq, first unveiled as a concept vehicle in August 2020, and continues with the flagship Celestiq, whose concept debuted in July 2022.

For the Lyriq, the design started with theme sketches with long dash-to-axle proportions drawn by Bobin Kil, Magalie Debellis, and Jason Chen; Brian Smith, the director of exterior design for Cadillac, recalled "Magalie's themes was the clear winner. That process helped set the direction for the LYRIQ, including the all-black roof, the side-view proportion, and the dark front end." The Lyriq team won a Gold Award for Automotive and Transport products from Good Design Australia in 2021.

She served on the jury for a 2021 design contest that proposed future electric vehicle charging stations, organized by Electric Autonomy Canada. She also has served as a judge for multiple Concours d'Elegance, including the 2019 and 2021 Concours d'Elegance of America in Plymouth, Michigan and the 2022 Hilton Head Island Concours d'Elegance.

In 2024, Debellis returned to Chevrolet, where she is the design director for Corvette, Performance, Cars, and Crossovers Exteriors.

In addition to her car design work, Debellis is a painter and sculptor of abstract art.

=== Notable designs ===
- Chevrolet Corvette (C7), model year (MY) 2014
- Chevrolet Camaro (sixth generation), MY 2016
- Cadillac Lyriq, MY 2023
- Cadillac Celestiq, MY 2024
- Cadillac Opulent Velocity (2024 concept)
