= Cadillac Escala =

Concept car developed by Cadillac

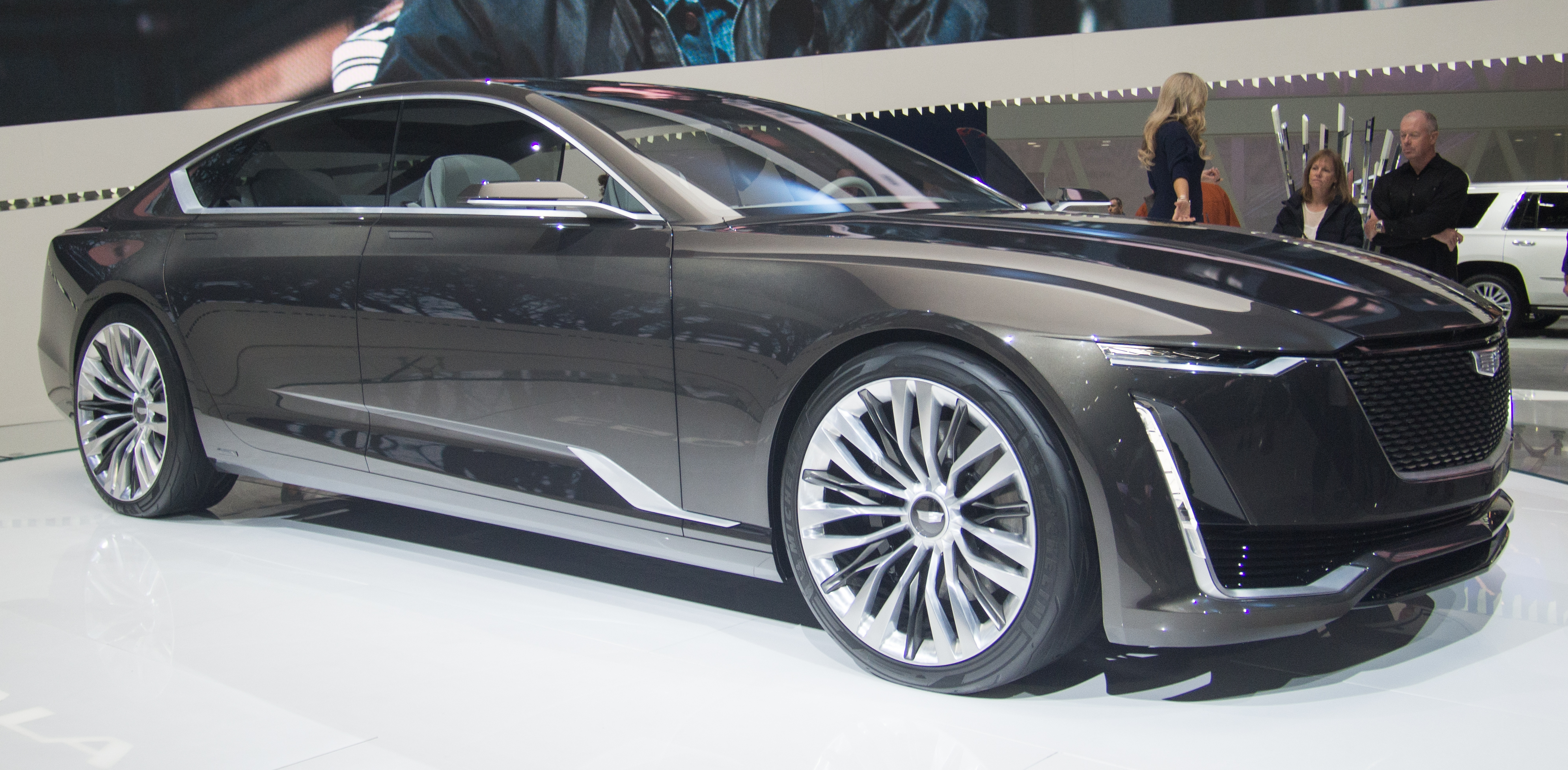
- Cadillac Escala at the 2016 LA Auto Show

Overview
- Manufacturer: Cadillac (General Motors)
- Production: 2016 (concept car)
- Designer: Frank Wu, Aaron Riggs (exterior); Eric Um (interior)

Body and chassis
- Class: Concept car
- Body style: 4-door liftback/hardtop sedan
- Layout: Front-engine, rear-wheel-drive
- Platform: GM Omega platform
- Related: Cadillac CT6

Powertrain
- Engine: 4.2 L V8 (twin-turbo gasoline)
- Transmission: 10-speed automatic

Dimensions
- Wheelbase: 127.1 in (3,228.3 mm)
- Length: 210.5 in (5,346.7 mm)
- Width: 76.7 in (1,948.2 mm)
- Height: 57.3 in (1,455.4 mm)

Chronology
- Predecessor: Cadillac Elmiraj

The Cadillac Escala is a concept car built by Cadillac for the 2016 Pebble Beach Concours d'Elegance. The last of a trifecta of concept cars initially conceived in 2007, it is preceded by the Ciel and Elmiraj, which had debuted back in 2011 and 2013 respectively. The Escala previews Cadillac's future design language, being an evolution of the Art and Science design philosophy that has been used on its cars for over a decade.

The Escala was first announced via a trailer video on August 15, 2016. Its name, revealed one day before its public debut, derives from the Spanish word for scale. This refers to the Escala using an elongated version of the Cadillac CT6's Omega underpinnings, being approximately six inches longer than the latter. The car was unveiled at a cocktail party in Carmel-by-the-Sea, California on August 18, 2016, which was attended by Cadillac President Johan de Nysschen, GM Vice President of Global Design Michael Simcoe and Cadillac's executive director of global design Andrew Smith, along with several other executives.

Although yet to be officially confirmed for production, it was described by de Nysschen as "a potential addition to our existing product plan” in a press release, its ultimate fate determined by the fertility of the flagship luxury sedan market. However, it previews the design, powertrain and other advanced technological features currently in development that is set to appear on other upcoming Cadillac production cars in the future.

== Overview ==
=== Exterior ===
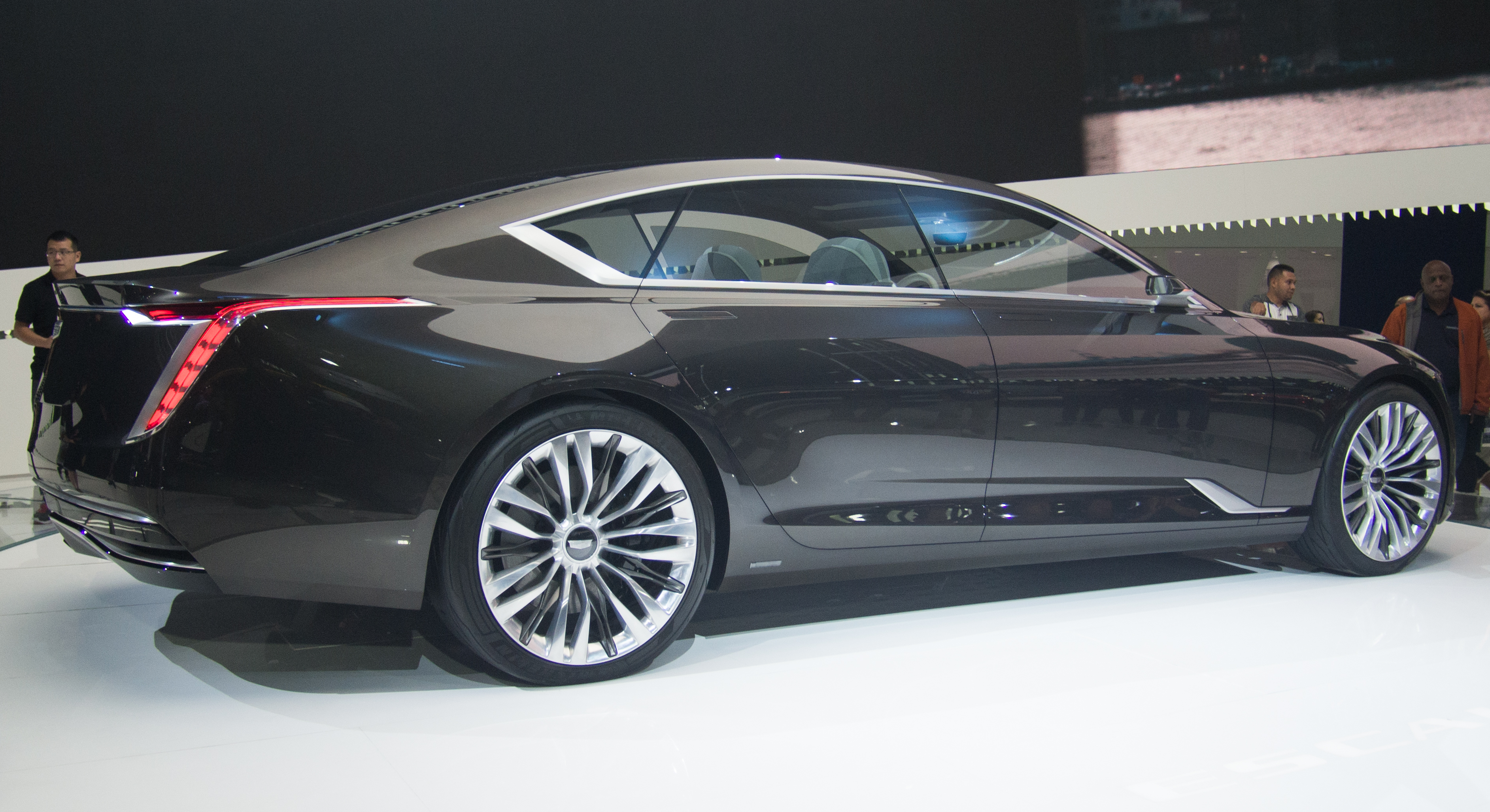
Cadillac Escala at the 2016 LA Auto Show

The exterior, painted in a nine-layer pearlescent blackish-brown "Gaia" finish, blends Cadillac's trademark Art and Science era design cues with more contemporary ones, being the first Cadillac to feature horizontal headlamps since the Seville was discontinued in 2004. This was done to give the car a more understated, harmonious look, in which simplicity is a prevalent theme on the Escala's design. They are complemented by two vertical strips of OLED daytime running lamps positioned just below the headlamps. A monotone Cadillac emblem adorns the three-dimensional mesh grille, patterned with several miniature crests. The car is designed as a four-door hardtop with a sloping rear roofline, giving a more athletic appearance, with a liftback tailgate at the rear end. When the trunk is opened, the cargo floor rises up to enable easier access to luggage. Also present on the car's C-pillar is the Hofmeister kink, a rarely seen trait for a Cadillac, possibly paying homage to the fastback Cadillac coupés of the late 1940s. Cadillac's signature vertical taillights are reworked, now added with a horizontal strip. It sits on 22-inch dual layer spoke wheels, fitted with 20-inch tires co-developed with Michelin that has the Cadillac chevron exclusively engraved onto the tire tread. The newly designed front fascia is expected to make its way to Cadillac production models starting in late 2018.

=== Interior ===
The handcrafted "dual personality" interior is designed specifically to combine driver technology amenities and rear-seat passenger comfort into one automobile. A wide, three-layered curved OLED screen developed with Samsung stretches across the dashboard in the driver's compartment, while accompanied by smaller, retractable displays at the back of the front seats for rear passengers. The normal metal top is replaced by a panoramic glass roof, which along with the absence of B-pillars gives the car a more "airy" feel associated with Cadillac hardtops from the 1950s to 1970s. Much of the upholstery, including the seatbacks, door panel and lower dashboard, is finished in a pale gray leather similar to those used in designer suits, contrasted by woven white wool. The famous Cadillac flying goddess, designed by William Schnell in 1930 and having last appeared in the 1950s, returns after a long hiatus in the form an etching on the car's glass infotainment controller, which replaces the older CUE system.

=== Powertrain ===
The Escala is powered by a Cadillac-exclusive 4.2-liter twin-turbocharged dual overhead camshaft V8 engine generating 500 horsepower, which is due to be introduced as a more powerful engine option in the CT6. The engine uses General Motors' new Active Fuel Management cylinder deactivation system, allowing the engine to run on four cylinders for better fuel efficiency. The car shares the mixed-material rear-wheel-drive Omega platform with the CT6, although enlarged by 4.7 inches, giving the car an extra 6.5 inches in overall length when compared to the latter.

=== Cancelled Cadillac CT8 ===
The Cadillac CT8, a flagship sedan larger than the CT6 was cancelled by GM. GM patent filings indicate a possible coupe version of the CT8.

== Media ==
The Escala was featured in a Cadillac advertisement as a symbol of what Cadillac's future will look like.
