= Cadillac Urban Luxury Concept =

Concept car developed by Cadillac

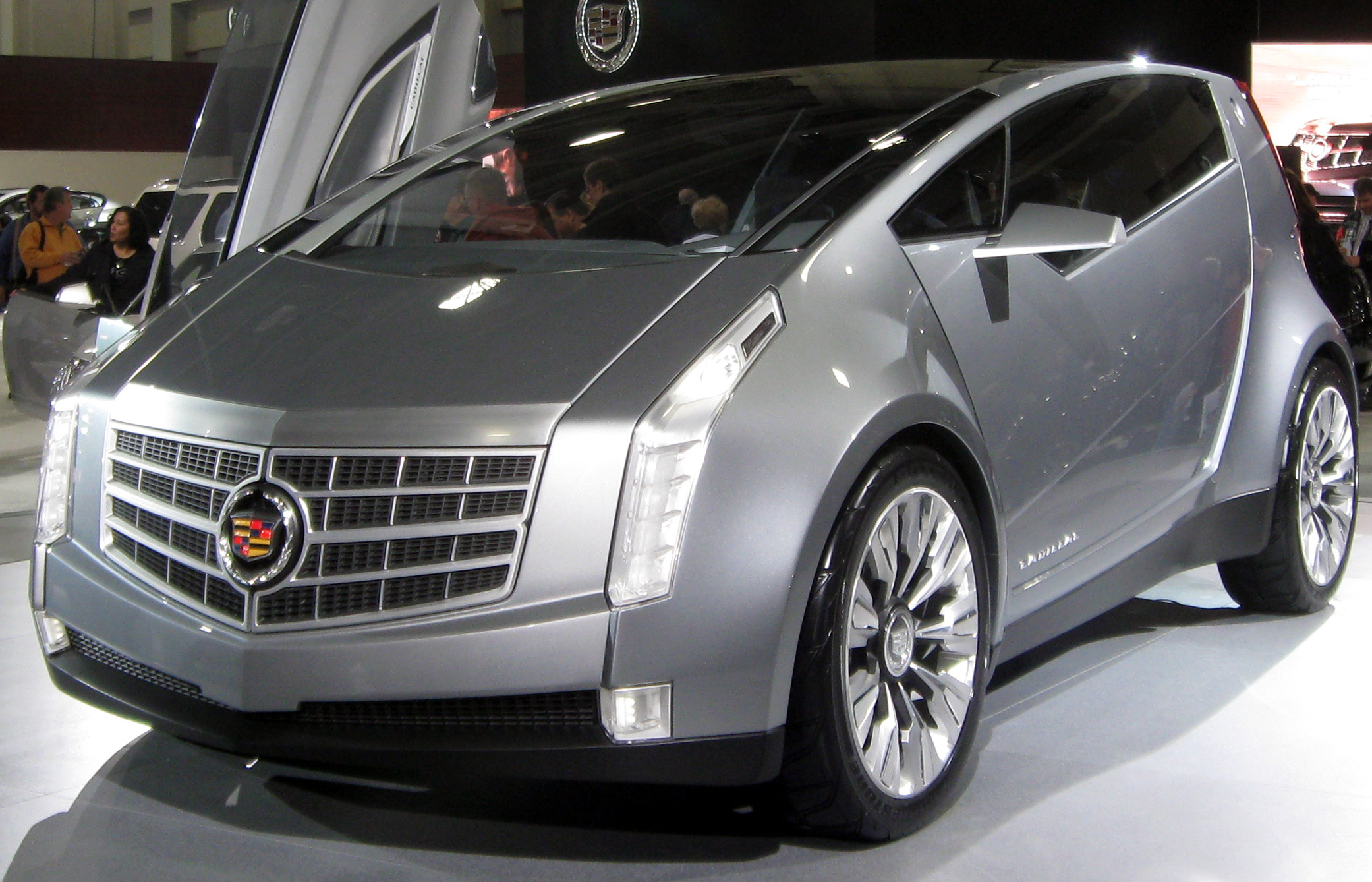

Overview
- Manufacturer: Cadillac
- Production: 2010
- Designer: Niki Smart

Body and chassis
- Class: Concept car
- Body style: 3-door hatchback
- Layout: Front-engine, front-wheel-drive
- Doors: Scissor

Powertrain
- Engine: 1.0 L I3
- Transmission: Dual-clutch

Dimensions
- Length: 151 in (3,800 mm)
- Width: 68.1 in (1,730 mm)
- Height: 56.9 in (1,450 mm)

The Cadillac Urban Luxury Concept (ULC) is a gasoline-electric hybrid, 4-seater, city concept car manufactured by Cadillac and unveiled at the 2010 Los Angeles Auto Show.

== Design ==
The ULC was designed by Niki Smart and features a signature wedge shaped styling cues from most of the Cadillac models of the 2000s.

== Features ==
The ULC features touchpad screens and projected displays that take the place of traditional gauges.

The ULC seats four adults, with access through a pair of scissor doors that extend outward and rotate forward when opened allowing easy access to all four seats.

== Powertrain and fuel efficiency ==
The ULC was powered by a 1.0L turbocharged 3-cylinder with 350kw electric power engine with a dual-clutch transmission and a hybrid propulsion system that employs electric assist technology, engine start-stop function, and brake energy regeneration. According to Cadillac, the ULC could potentially achieve 156 miles per US gallon (1.51 L/100 km; 187 mpg_{‑imp}) in the city and 165 miles per US gallon (1.43 L/100 km; 198 mpg_{‑imp}) on the highway.

== Gallery ==
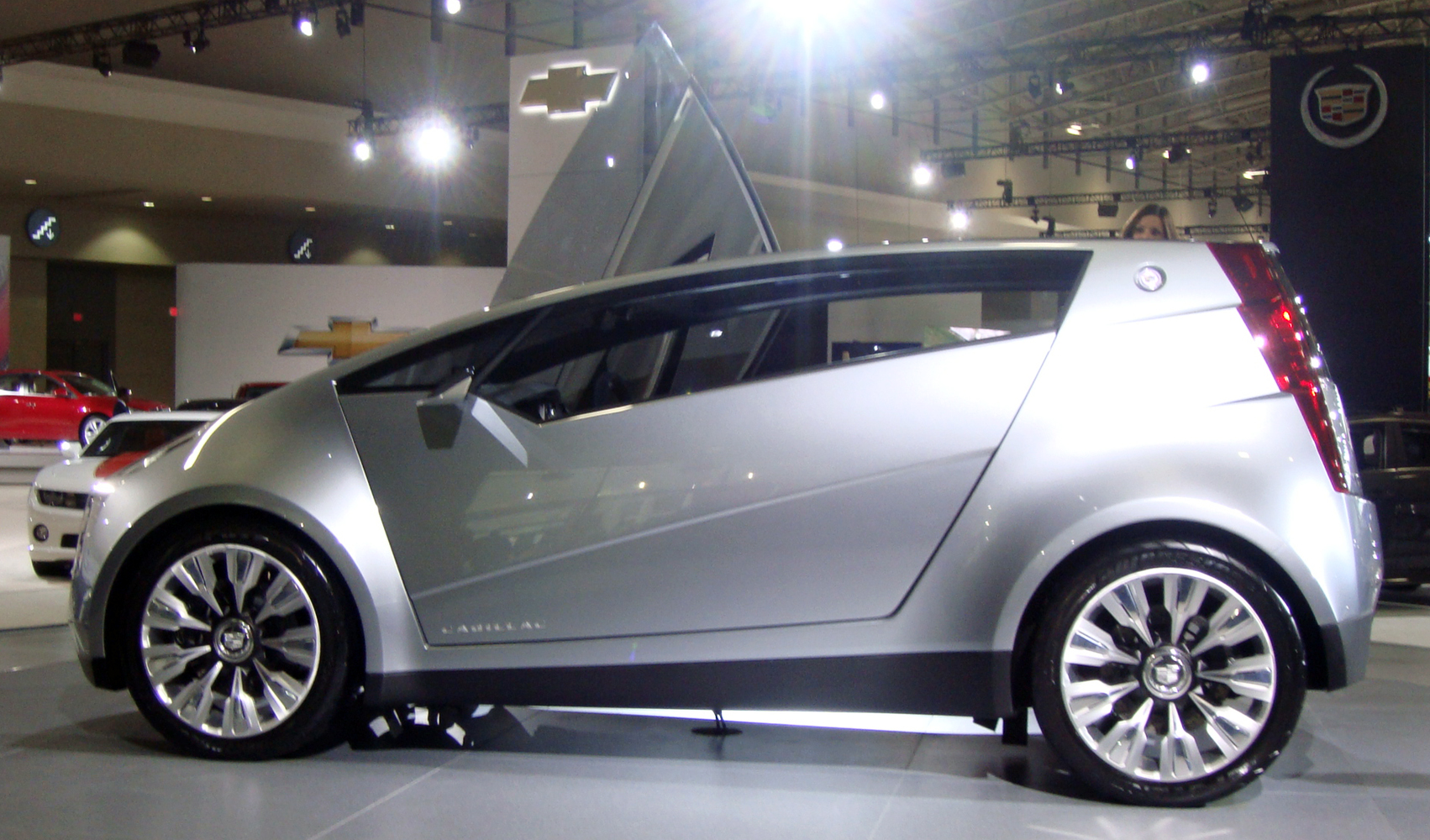
Side view

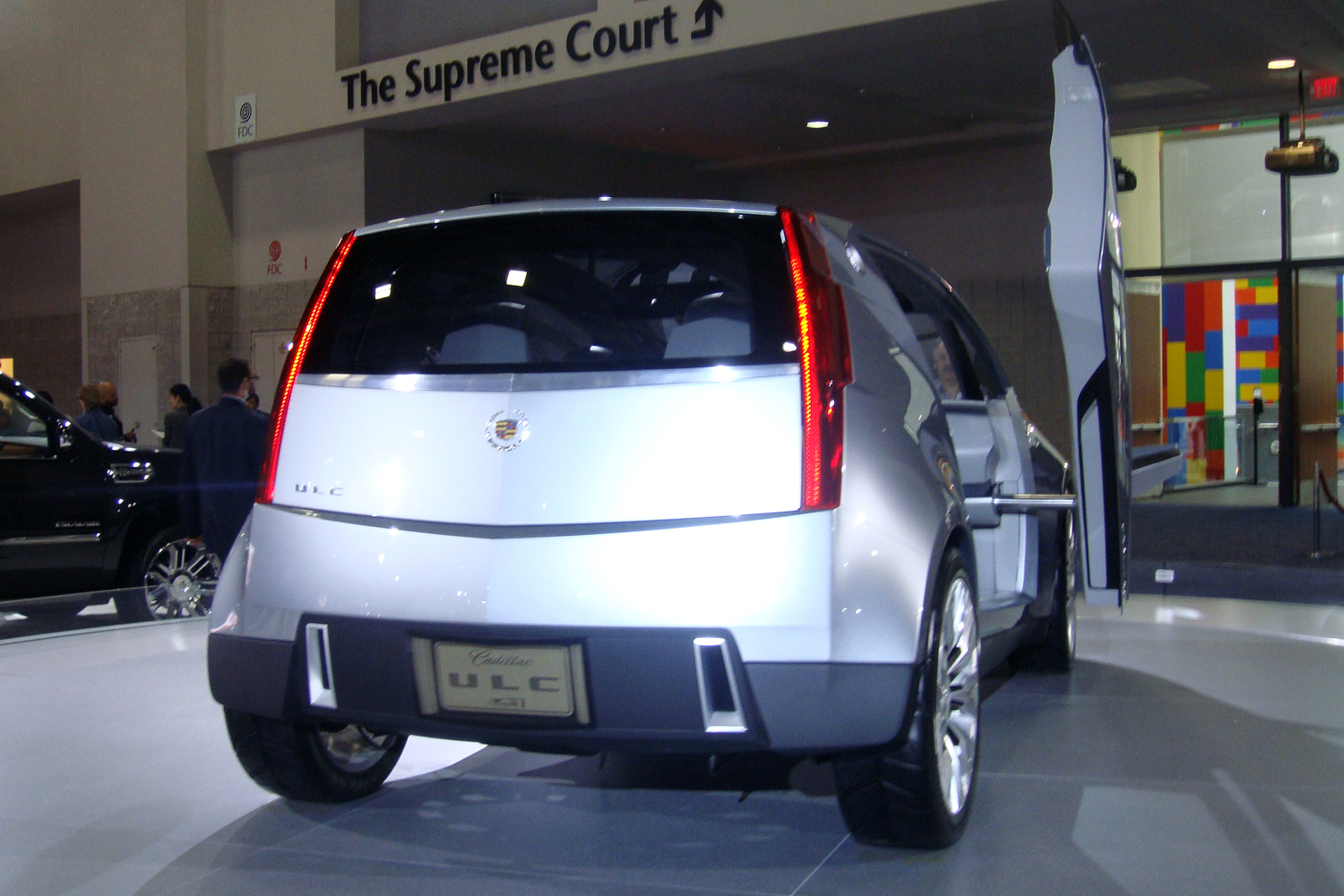
Rear view.

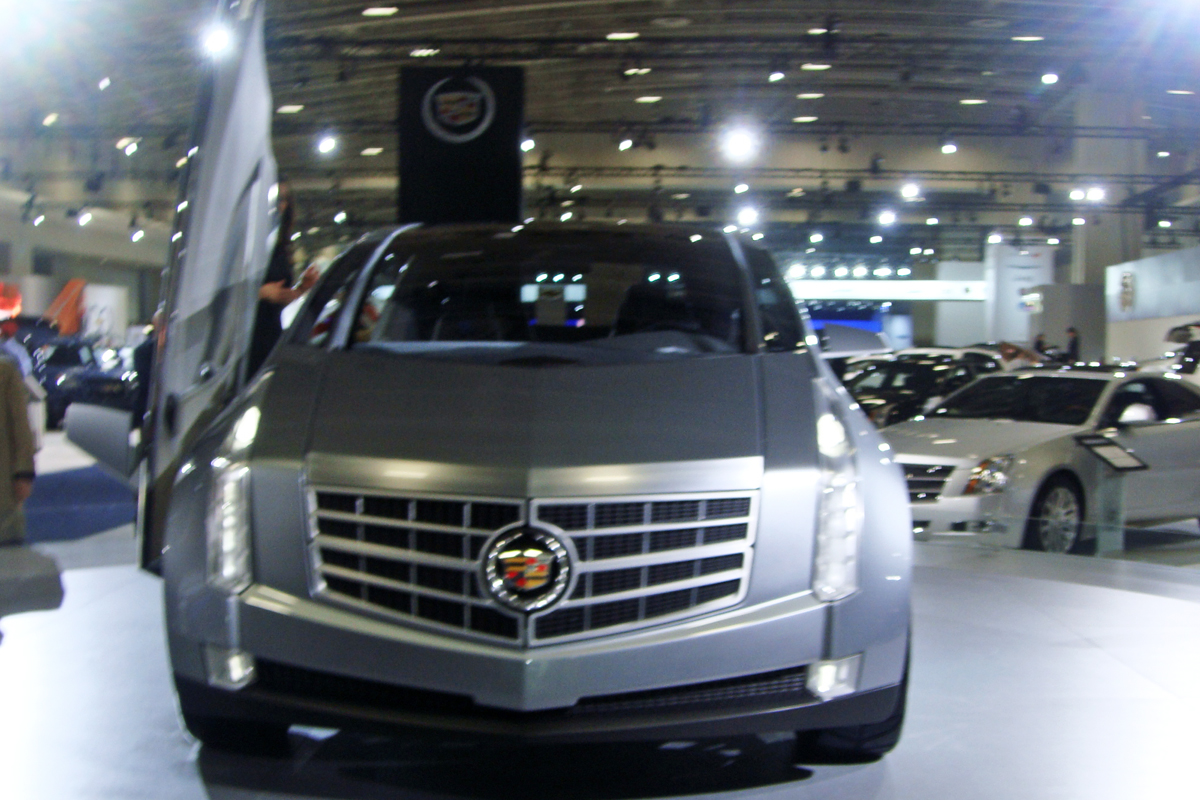
Frontal view

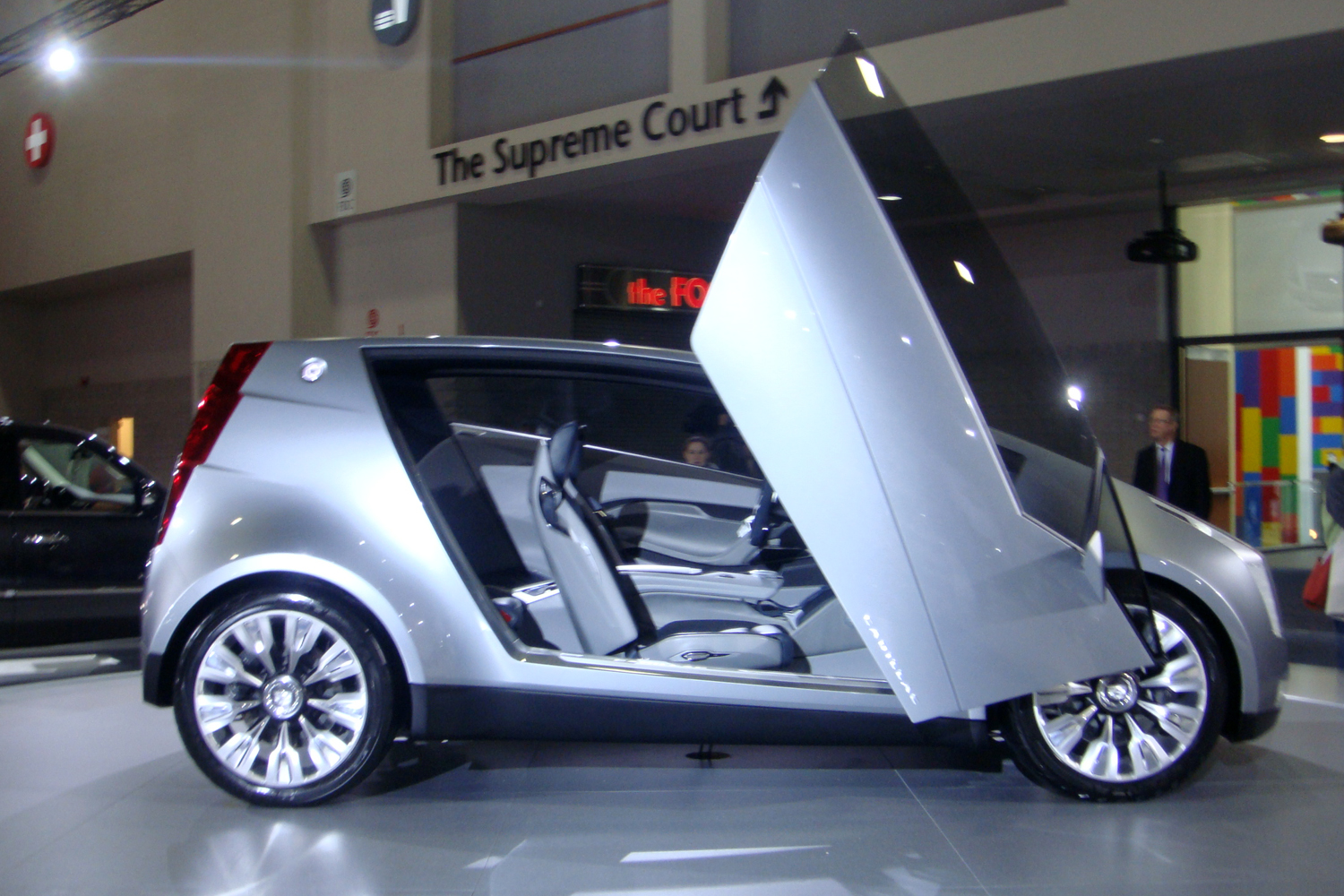
Side view.

== See also ==
- BMW Mega City Vehicle
- CityCar
- General Motors EN-V
- Hybrid electric vehicle
- Personal Urban Mobility and Accessibility
