= Cadillac Sollei =

Battery electric full-size luxury convertible

Overview
- Manufacturer: General Motors
- Assembly: United States
- Designer: Erin Crossley

Body and chassis
- Class: Concept car
- Body style: 2-door convertible
- Related: Cadillac Celestiq

Powertrain
- Battery: Ultium lithium-ion battery

The Cadillac Sollei is a battery electric concept car previewed by the Cadillac division of General Motors. The Sollei concept car is Cadillac's flagship convertible, showcasing design, proportions and style of the upcoming luxury convertible. It is the convertible version of the Cadillac Celestiq.

== See also ==
- Cadillac Celestiq
