= Hartley V8 engine =

Hartley H1 V8

Overview
- Manufacturer: Hartley Enterprises

Layout
- Configuration: 75°-90° V8, 32-valve, (four-valves per cylinder), petrol engine
- Displacement: 2.5–3.3 L (152.6–201.4 cu in)
- Cylinder bore: 81–84 mm (3–3 in)
- Piston stroke: 63–74 mm (2–3 in)
- Cylinder block material: Cast aluminium alloy
- Cylinder head material: Cast aluminium alloy
- Valvetrain: 32v DOHC (quad-cam)

Combustion
- Fuel type: Petrol
- Oil system: Dry sump
- Cooling system: Water-cooled

Output
- Power output: 420–520 hp (313–388 kW)
- Torque output: 245–280 lb⋅ft (332–380 N⋅m)

Dimensions
- Length: 485 mm (19 in)
- Width: 530 mm (21 in)
- Height: 530 mm (21 in)
- Dry weight: 200–212 lb (91–96 kg)

The Hartley V8 engine is a series of a four-stroke naturally-aspirated DOHC V8 engines, designed, developed and built by American John Hartley and Hartley Enterprises, which has been produced since 2004. It was famously used in the well-known Ariel Atom 500 V8 sports car model.
