= Niki Smart =

British car designer (born 1973)

- Born: June 10, 1973 (age 53); Brackley, Northamptonshire, UK
- Education: Coventry University; Royal College of Art, London
- Occupation: Freelance automotive designer based in Los Angeles
- Years active: 1998–present
- Children: 2

Niki Smart is a British car designer, known for being the lead designer on the Ariel Atom project and his concept car design for Cadillac, as design manager for the General Motors Advanced Design team in Los Angeles, California.

Smart began designing the Ariel Atom whilst studying at Coventry University, in conjunction with Ariel Motor Company boss and senior transport design lecturer Simon Saunders. Smart completed his master's in vehicle design at the Royal College of Art, London in 1999. In 1997, Smart moved on to Tom Walkinshaw Racing as a designer and then to the Ford Motor Company in 1998.

Smart was exterior design manager for the General Motors Advanced Design team in Los Angeles, California up until 2019, and oversaw the design of the Cadillac Urban Luxury Concept in 2010 and the Cadillac Ciel Concept, a hybrid electric concept car released in 2011.

Smart also oversaw the design of the Cadillac Elmiraj, which was unveiled at Pebble Beach Concours d'Elegance in 2013.

On its debut at the 2019 Quail Motorcycle Gathering, Smart unveiled the ABC 500. It received first place in the Modified Class.
