= Drakan Spyder =

Overview
- Manufacturer: Sector111
- Production: 2015 (10 Units)
- Model years: 2016
- Designer: Shinoo Mapleton, Dennis Palatov

Body and chassis
- Class: Sports car

Powertrain
- Engine: 6.2 L (1 imp gal; 2 US gal) GM LS3 engine V-8
- Transmission: Porsche G96 6-speed manual

Dimensions
- Wheelbase: 103 in (2,616 mm)
- Length: 156 in (3,962 mm)
- Width: 80 in (2,032 mm)
- Height: 44 in (1,118 mm)
- Curb weight: 2,000 lb (907 kg)

The Drakan Spyder is an American open sports car manufactured by Sector111 based on the Palatov Motorsport, LLC D2. It has a 6.2 GM LS3 V-8 engine that achieves a 0 to 60 miles per hour (0 to 97 km/h) time of 3.2 seconds. In addition to the engine from a Chevrolet Corvette, it has a six-speed manual transmission from a Porsche 911. It can be purchased as either a rolling chassis or a completed car.

It was a featured vehicle on Jay Leno's Garage.
