= Research Frontiers =

American nanotechnology company developing smart glass

Research Frontiers Inc.
- Company type: Public
- Traded as: Nasdaq: REFR
- Industry: Nanotechnology
- Founded: October 1965; 60 years ago
- Founder: Robert Saxe
- Headquarters: Woodbury, New York, US
- Area served: Worldwide
- Key people: Joseph Harary (Chairman and CEO)
- Products: Smart glass
- Website: www.smartglass.com

Research Frontiers is an American nanotechnology company based in Woodbury, New York that was founded by Robert Saxe in 1965 to develop light control technology from Polaroid known as smart glass. The company develops and licenses its patented SPD-SmartGlass technology. The company currently has six full-time employees.

== Industries ==
Research Frontiers' technology is applicable in transportation production, including aircraft, vehicles, boats, and yachts. It is also marketed for architectural development of residential homes and commercial offices, and for art and artifact conservation.
