= Cadillac Elmiraj =

Concept car developed by Cadillac

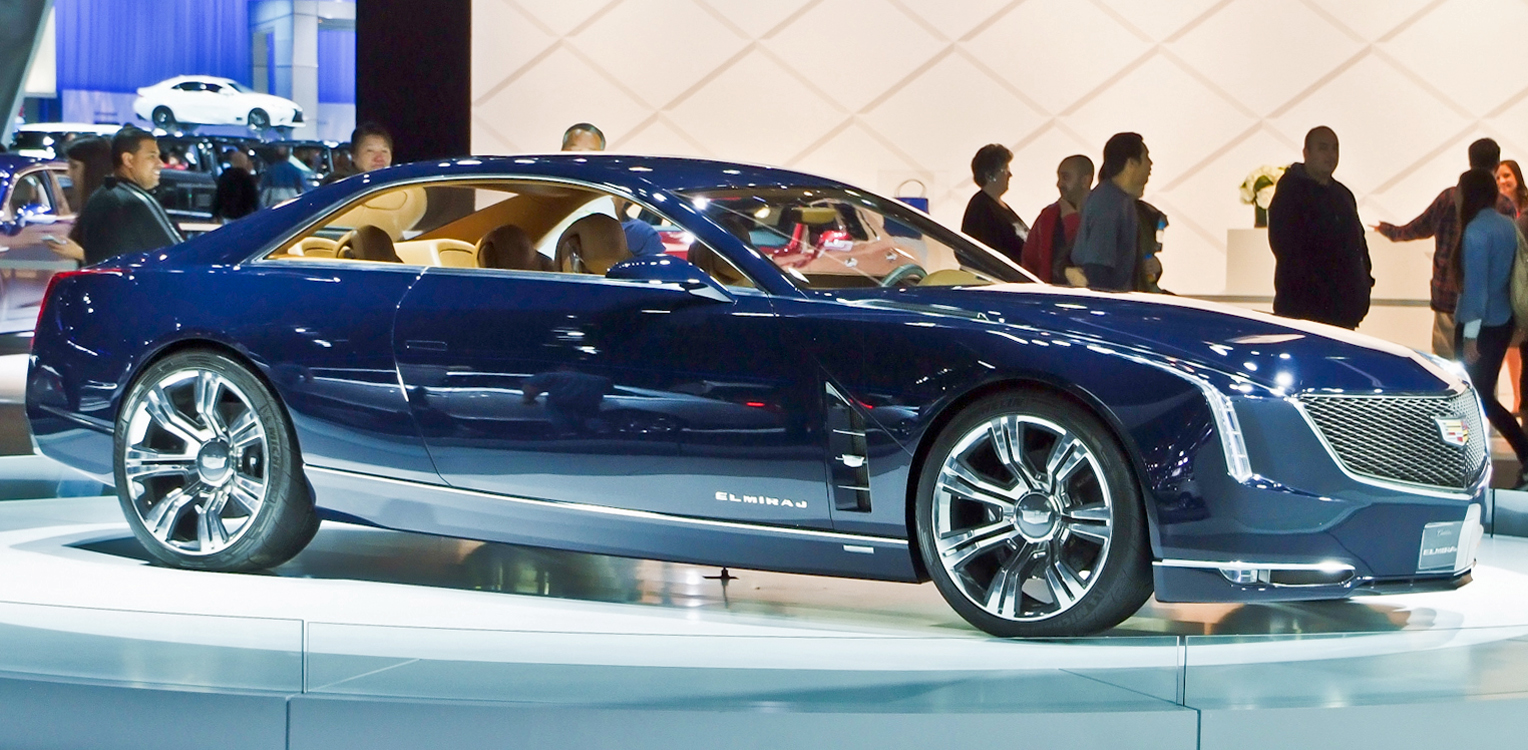
- Cadillac Elmiraj shown at the 2013 LA Auto Show

Overview
- Manufacturer: Cadillac (General Motors)
- Production: 2013 (Concept car)
- Designer: Niki Smart

Body and chassis
- Class: Concept car
- Body style: 2-door, 4-seat hardtop coupe
- Layout: Front-engine, rear-wheel drive
- Related: Cadillac Ciel

Powertrain
- Engine: 4.5 L twin-turbocharged V8
- Transmission: 8-speed automatic

Dimensions
- Length: 5,207.0 mm (205 in)
- Width: 1,930.4 mm (76 in)
- Height: 1,397.0 mm (55 in)
- Curb weight: approx. 1,814 kg (4,000 lb)

Chronology
- Predecessor: Cadillac Ciel
- Successor: Cadillac Escala

The Cadillac Elmiraj is a concept car created by Cadillac and presented at the 2013 Pebble Beach Concours d'Elegance on August 15, 2013. It continues the development begun by the Cadillac Ciel concept car.

The concept was reportedly named after El Mirage, a dry lake bed in California that was used for high speed runs, as well as recalling Cadillac's historic Eldorado nameplate.

== Overview ==
The Elmiraj is a 2-door, 4-seat full-size luxury coupe. The concept runs and drives, and is reportedly powered by a 4.5-liter twin turbocharged V8 engine producing an estimated 500 hp (373 kW) and 500 lb⋅ft (678 N⋅m) of torque. It features a pillarless hardtop profile, a body style abandoned by U.S. automakers since the late 1970s. The design of the Elmiraj was inspired by the 1967 Cadillac Eldorado.

The Elmiraj is rear-wheel drive and was "constructed with chassis and structural elements of an ongoing Cadillac vehicle development project slated for future production". According to a blog article claiming to be informed by an insider, this platform is under development by the name of Omega, to underpin future top-of-the-line Cadillac cars to compete with the European premium class like the Audi A8, BMW 7 Series, and Mercedes-Benz S-Class.

One of the inspirations for the interior of the Elmiraj, according to the interior design team, was mid-century modern furniture, such as the Eames Lounge Chair. Like early versions of that chair, the seat backs in the car, as well as multiple trim pieces, are made from Brazilian rosewood, which Cadillac claims was sourced from "already fallen" wood. Other interior materials include black and tan leather for the upholstery, and titanium for the rest of the trim pieces. Features of the interior include a digital gauge cluster screen, which still retains an analog speedometer and tachometer, and a retractable 10 inch center touchscreen.

Niki Smart, lead exterior designer on the Elmira J project, said “We wanted a mature statement for Cadillac where simplicity and subtle adornments create a purposeful presence.”

“Elmiraj advances Cadillac’s provocative modern design and performance, contrasted with bespoke craftsmanship and luxury,” said Mark Adams, Cadillac's design director at the time. “It explores performance driving, as well as how we’re approaching elevating the Cadillac range and new dimensions of Art & Science philosophy”.

The Elmiraj was shown at the 2013 IAA (Internationale Automobilausstellung) in Frankfurt, Germany.

== Gallery ==
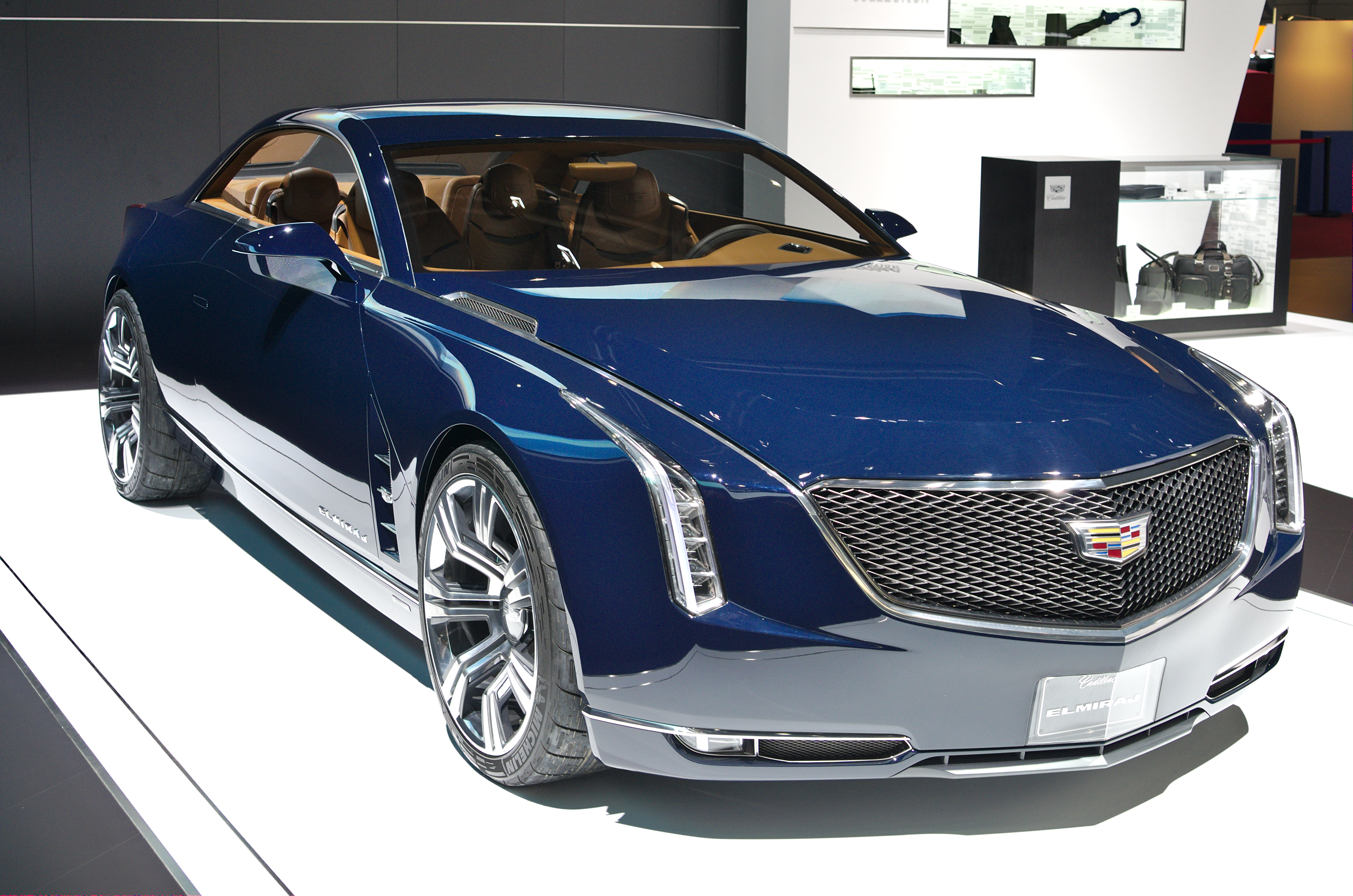
Front view

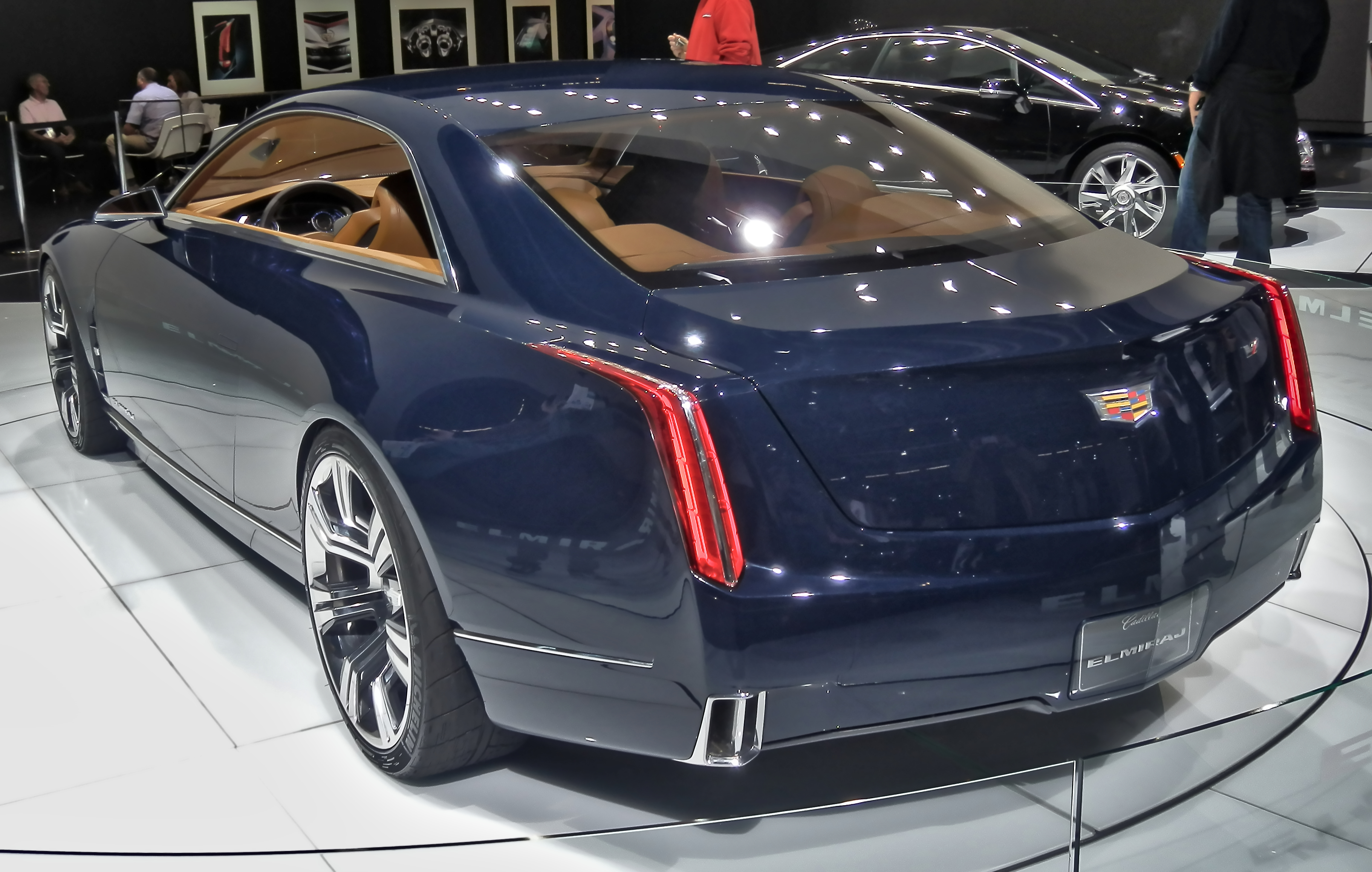
Rear view

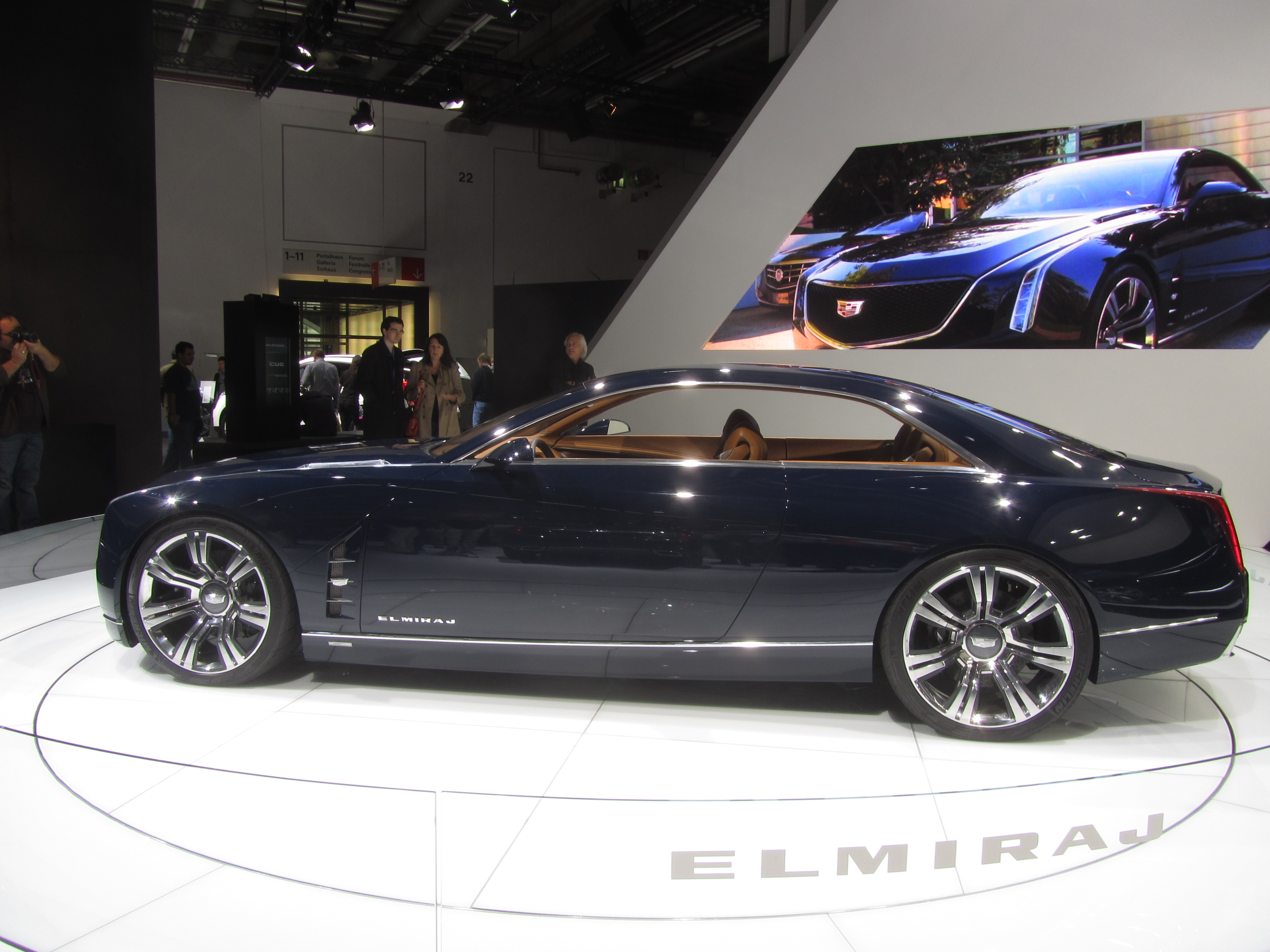
Lateral view

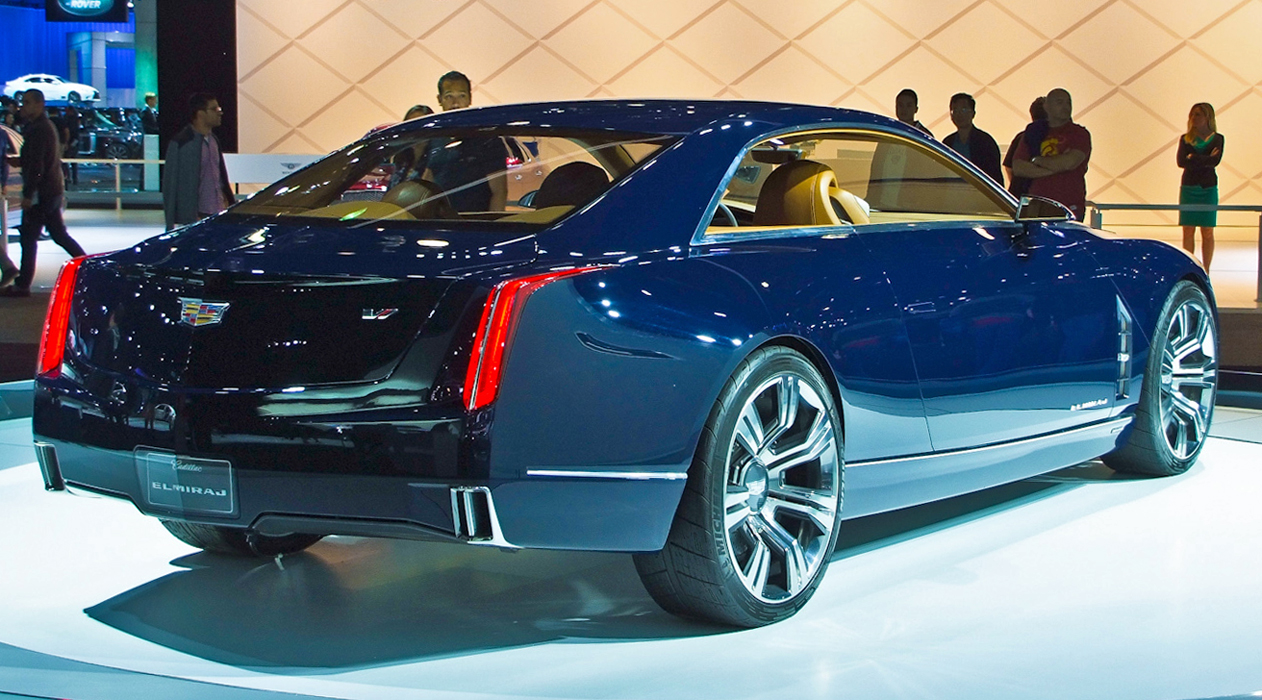
Three quarters rear view

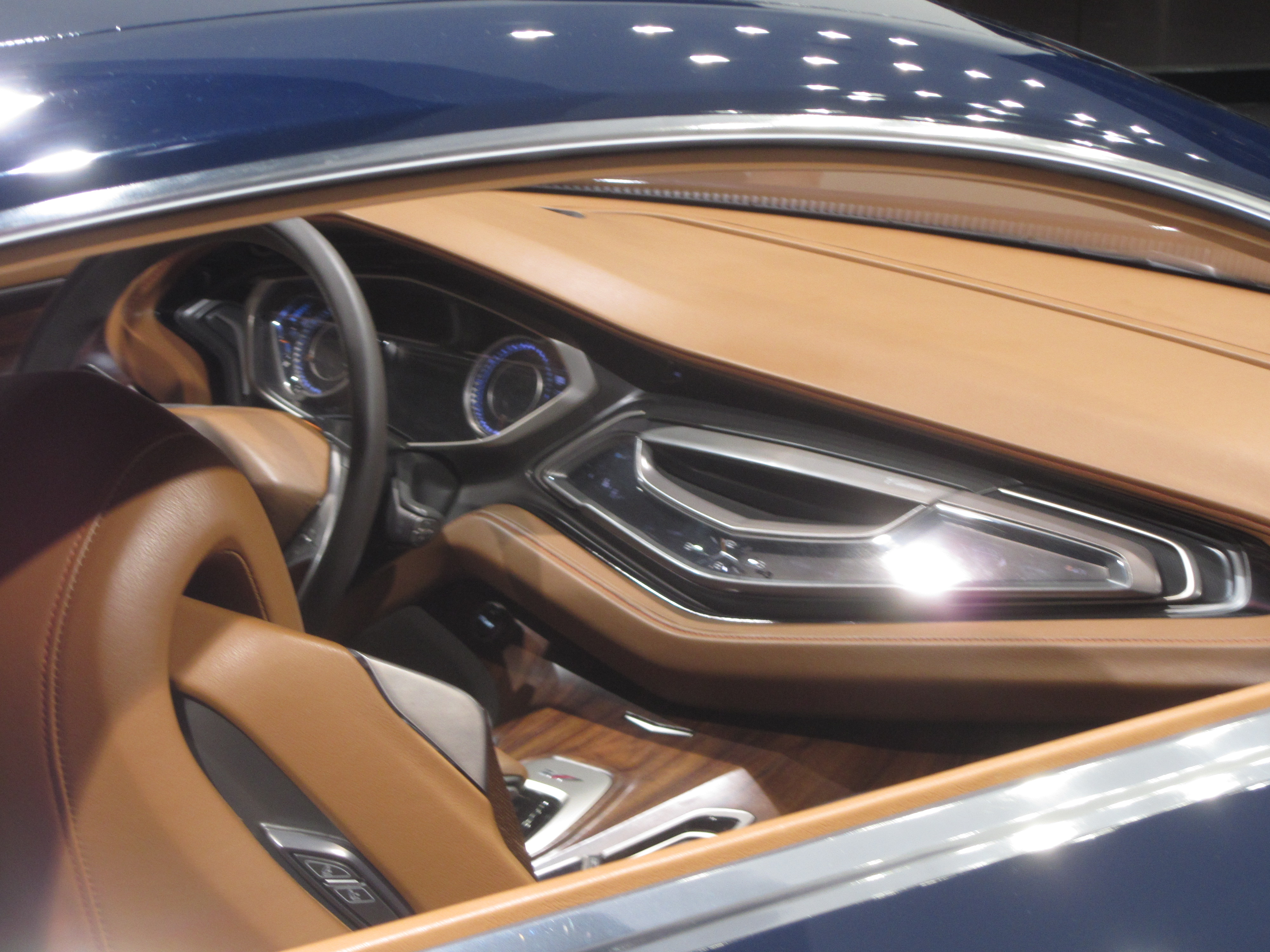
Dashboard
