= Strate School of Design =

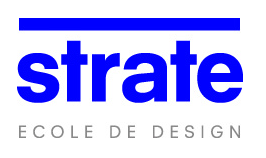
- Former name: Strate College
- Motto: Making the world +simple +fair +beautiful
- Type: Private
- Established: 1993
- Affiliations: Cumulus Association, Studialis
- Director: Dominique Sciamma
- Academic staff: 150
- Administrative staff: 28
- Students: 620
- Doctoral students: 5
- Location: Sèvres, France; 48.8237°N 2.2247°E
- Campus: Sèvres, Lyon, Bangalore, Singapore
- Website: www.strate.design www.strate.education strate.in

Strate School of Design (formerly known as Strate College) is a French private institution for technical education founded in 1993. Its main campus is in Sèvres south-west of Paris. It is dedicated to the teaching of industrial design, 3D modeling and design thinking. The school is recognized by the French state and its design degree is certified by the French Ministry of Higher Education.

== Key dates ==
1993

Jean-René Talopp, former designer and director of the "ESDI" design school, founds Strate Collège.

2010

The school moves to a new campus in Sèvres.

2013

Dominique Sciamma becomes the director of Strate.

2014

The school changes its name to Strate School of Design, and logo and adopts a new motto: Making the world +simple, +fair, +beautiful.

2015

The Strate Executive Education programme is launched to train professionals and managerial staff to Design Thinking and innovation by design.

Strate is recognized by the French state in the publication of the Bulletin Officiel de l'Enseignement Supérieur et de la Recherche on 7 December 2015. This has entitled the school to welcome government scholars for the design and modeling courses since 2017.

2017

The Ministry’s of Higher Education Bulletin Officiel de l'Enseignement Supérieur et de la Recherche lists the school as one of the few design schools in France to deliver a diploma recognized by the Minister in charge of higher education.

== Teaching ==
Some programs last five years (bac+5), others three (MBA). The two main subjects in the curriculum are design and modeling.

=== Design course ===
The first two years of the design course are about teaching the fundamentals of drawing, perspective, modeling and design methodology.

In the third year, students specialize in one major: product, transportation, packaging & retail, or interaction. A first six-month internship takes place in the third year.

In year four, students are requested to spend the first semester abroad either at a partner design school of the CUMULUS association, or by doing an internship. The students then come back to school for a period of projects with partner companies.

The fifth year is dedicated to the preparation of the diploma. Students are requested to write a memoir and formalize their project, which they present to a jury of professionals (independent designers, designers in agencies, office managers, marketing managers). After this presentation students are requested to do a final internship in France or abroad.

=== 3D modeling course ===
The 3D modeling course is a 3-year undergraduate diploma that teaches traditional and digital modeling.

== Degrees ==
Strate issues the industrial designer diploma, which is recognized by the government as a level I title for the 5 years of studies after the French baccalaureate (niveau I RNCP code 200n, JO du 06-07-08). Since the publication of the Higher Education Ministry "Bulletin Officiel de l'Enseignement Supérieur et de la Recherche" on June the 29th 2017 the school is one of the few design schools in France to deliver a degree referred to by the Minister of higher education.

For the design course, two double-diploma agreements exist with the Grenoble School of Management and Sciences Po Paris.

Two double-degree designer-manager options are offered to students by doing an additional tuition-free year at the Grenoble School of Management or Sciences Po Paris.

== Programs taught in English ==
=== Master in Design in Transportation ===
The Master in Design in Transportation is a 2-year post-graduate master's degree. It is recognized by the French State through its registration by the National Council of Professional Certification (RNCP) at Level 1.

=== Master in Design for Smart Cities ===
The Master in Design for Smart Cities is a 2-year post-graduate master's degree. The course can take place in Paris and Singapore. It is recognized by the French State through its registration by the National Council of Professional Certification (RNCP) at Level 1.

== Partnerships ==
=== Academic partnerships ===
For the design course student exchanges are made with other schools of the international association of art & design universities, CUMULUS.

Two double-degree agreements exist with Grenoble School of Management and Sciences Po Paris.

The school has developed the collaborative project CPi (Conception de produit innovant) with the engineering school Centrale Supélec and ESSEC Business School. For 9 months mixed teams of students of the three schools work on innovation challenges submitted by partner companies. Since 2005 over fifty compagnies have supported the program producing 150 students projects.

Since 2014 the Design & Science Université Paris-Saclay prize has been led by Strate. It was previously called "ArtScience Prize" from 2014 to 2016. It gathers students of Strate with students from prestigious French engineering schools such as Télécom ParisTech, CentraleSupélec, ENS Paris-Saclay or École Polytechnique to work on a same project. It aims to develop innovative ideas upon advanced scientific themes. Every year about 40 students work together on the same brief for six months, and are coached by professors from their schools; the winners of the prize get a scholarship for the development of their project and other support.

Strate is one of the founding schools of the Web School Factory school in Paris.

=== Links with businesses ===
The school has signed various agreements with companies to train the employees through the Strate Executive Education branch and companies to offer innovation, research projects and internships to students:

- Korian in October 2017
- Laval Virtual in March 2017
- CEA List in March 2017
- L'Oréal in March 2016
- Derichebourg Multiservices in September 2015
- Carrefour in June 2015
- Renault in December 2013

=== Research ===
The school has a research branch, Strate Research, and is part of various French institutes:

- member of the Institut Vedecom for clean and sustainable transportation;
- member of Institut Carnot Telecom & Société numérique which has been labeled Carnot for the quality of its research partnerships;
- member of Institut de recherche et d'innovation;

In June 2017 the EXALT Design Lab for design valorization in businesses was created at Strate, in cooperation with 5 large companies and two major academic laboratories. All partners are engaged in a 4-year research project.

== Rankings ==
The French student magazine l'Étudiant published some years a ranking of the "product design schools preferred by professionals" (écoles de design produit préférées des pros). There are about 77 design schools in France and Strate is regularly mentioned as one of the best.

French rankings
	2013	2014	2015	2016	2017	2018
L'Étudiant (favourite design schools according to professionals)	-	5th	-	2nd	3rd	3rd

International rankings
	2013	2014	2015	2016	2017
Car Design News (Car Design Awards School League Table 2011-2015)	2nd	2nd	2nd	-	-
Car Design News (Winning Index of schools, based on data from 2011-2015)	5th	5th	5th	-	-

In 2017 the student news website l'Étudiant said Strate School of Design distinguished itself through its dynamism, following closely the mutations of the designer's profession, and also by creating partnerships with foreign schools and collaborations with various research actors.

The school is well known in the car design world since its transportation design course has existed since the school's opening in 1993. The website Car Design News by adding up all the successive results for the years 2011 to 2015 of student participation in the Car Design Awards competition ranked the school as one of the top transportation design schools in the world.

== Alumni ==
The association Strate Alumni has over 1200 members.

== International ==
Strate School of Design is a member of the international association of art & design universities, CUMULUS. For the design course, student exchanges are made with other schools in CUMULUS.

The school is also a member of the World Design Organization, an international non-governmental organization that promotes the profession of industrial design and its ability to generate better products, systems, services, and experiences.

=== Singapore and Bangalore campuses ===
Strate School of Design was established in Singapore in 2017, and received in 2018 the registration from the Committee For Private Education / SkillsFuture (part of Ministry of Education). Strate also signed a partnership with the Social Innovation Park, a not-for-profit organization aiming to educate, empower and enhance social entrepreneurs and innovators. The campus of Strate is located in the epicenter of design for Singapore, namely the National Design Centre. Strate Singapore offers a suite of design curricula of which the Master in Design for Smart Cities, in both full-time and part-time formats.

Strate School of Design opened a large campus in Bangalore, India in 2018, with other institutions from the Studialis group.

== Ownership ==
The school is a member of the Studialis group that belongs to the investment fund GALILEO.
