= Cadillac Ciel =

Concept car developed by Cadillac

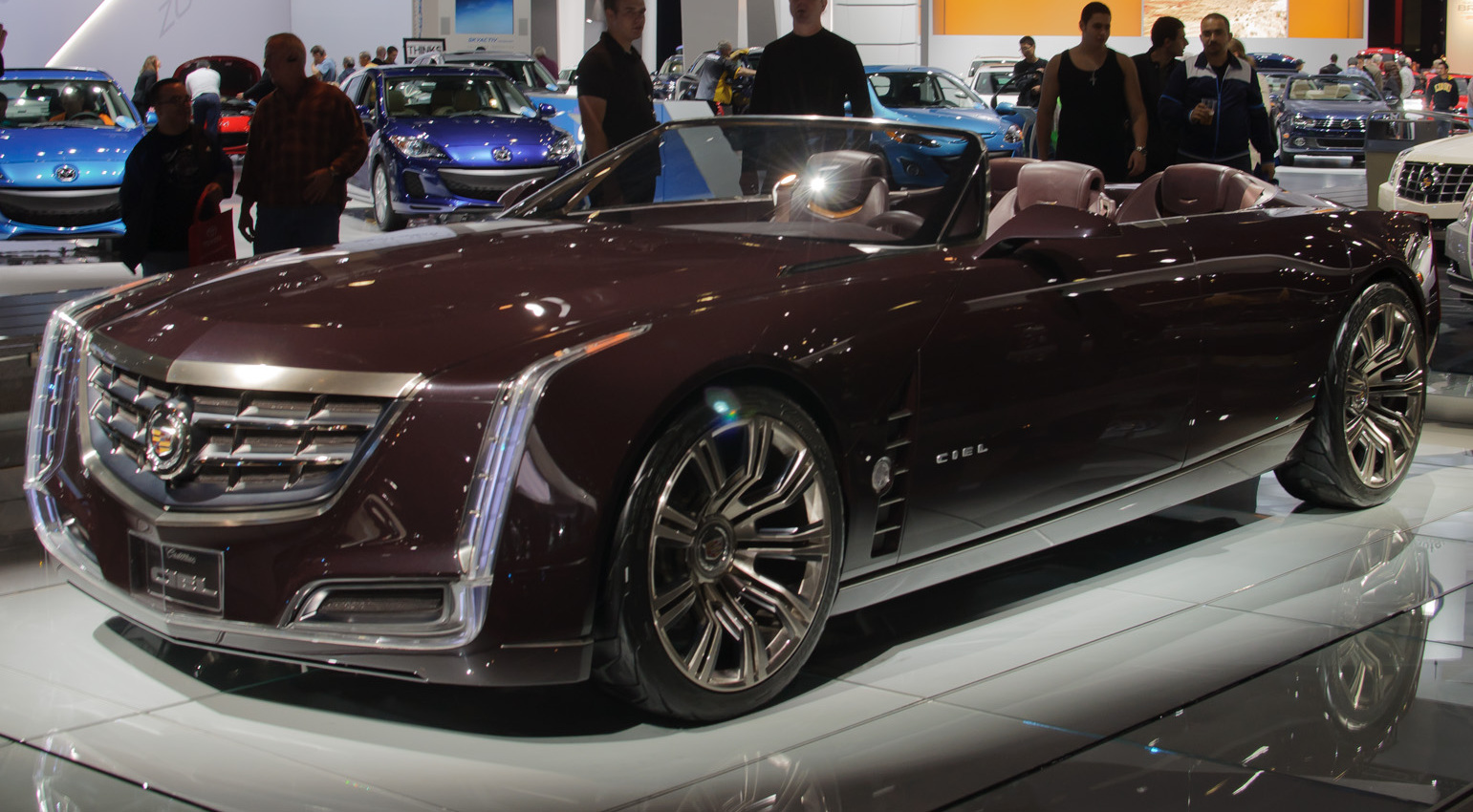

Overview
- Manufacturer: Cadillac
- Production: 2011 (concept car)
- Designer: Niki Smart

Body and chassis
- Class: Concept car
- Body style: 4-door convertible
- Layout: Rear-wheel drive
- Related: Cadillac Elmiraj

Powertrain
- Engine: Twin-turbocharged 3.6 L direct injection V6

Dimensions
- Wheelbase: 125 in (3,200 mm)

Chronology
- Successor: Cadillac Elmiraj

The Cadillac Ciel is a hybrid electric concept car created by Cadillac and unveiled at the 2011 Pebble Beach Concours d'Elegance. The Ciel has a twin-turbocharged 3.6-liter direct injection V6 producing 425 hp (317 kW) and a hybrid system using lithium-ion battery technology. The Ciel is a four-seat convertible with a wheelbase of 125 inches (3,200 mm). It was developed at GM Design's North Hollywood Design Center.

The Ciel has rear suicide doors, and the interior features a smooth wooden dashboard with a simple gauge look. The word "Ciel" is French for "sky"- which is what the designers had in mind when they made the vehicle.

In 2012 and early 2013, Cadillac contemplated developing a production car based on the Ciel. However, in July 2013, they decided not to pursue the venture.

At the 2013 Pebble Beach Concours d'Elegance, Cadillac unveiled a new concept, the Elmiraj, which is similar in design to the Ciel, except it is a coupe. Both vehicles were designed by Niki Smart.

The Cadillac Ciel was featured in the 2015 film Entourage as a gift from talent agent Ari Gold to the main character Vincent Chase for the success of his directorial debut in the fictional movie, Hyde.

== Gallery ==
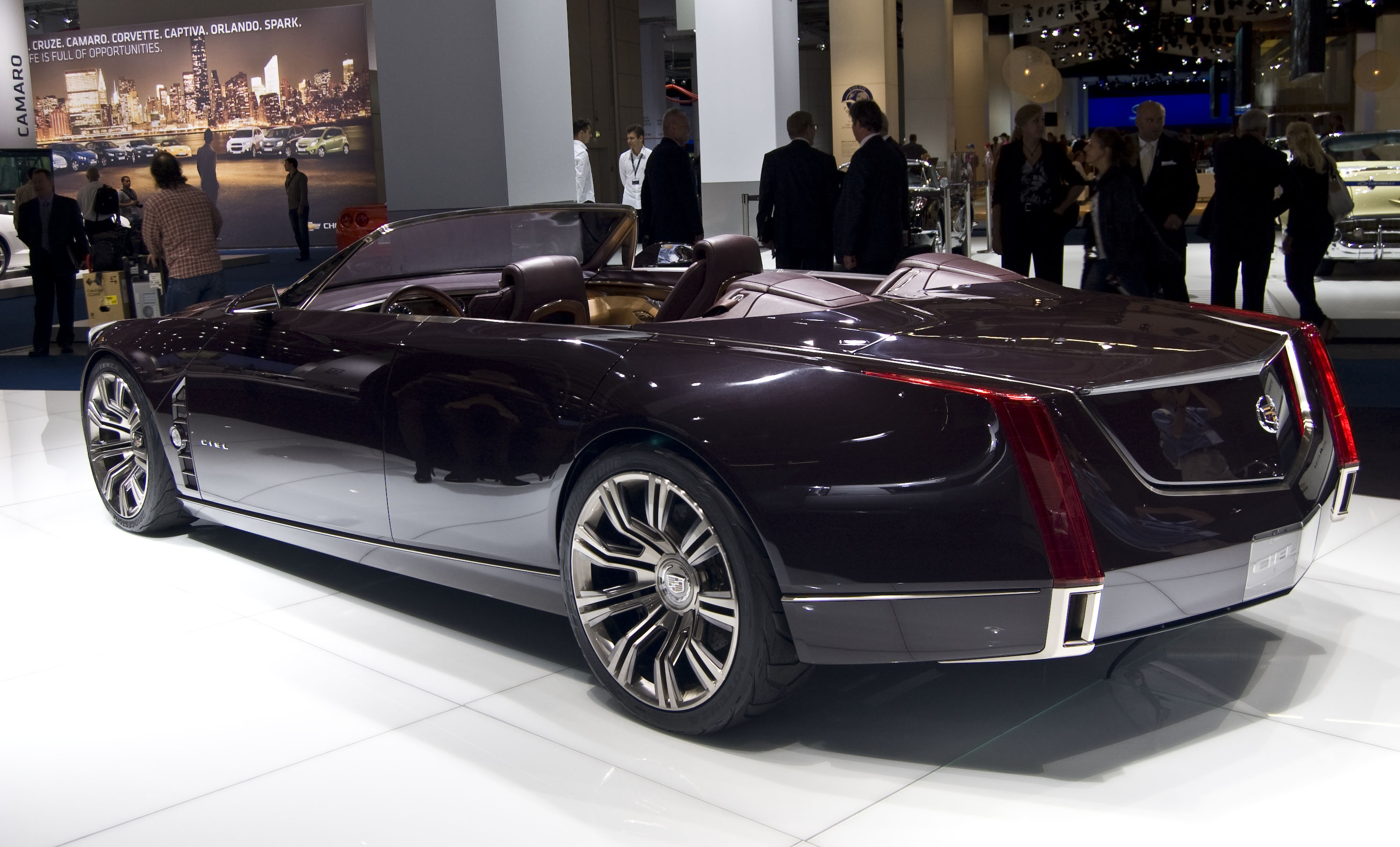
Cadillac Ciel at the 2011 Frankfurt Auto Show

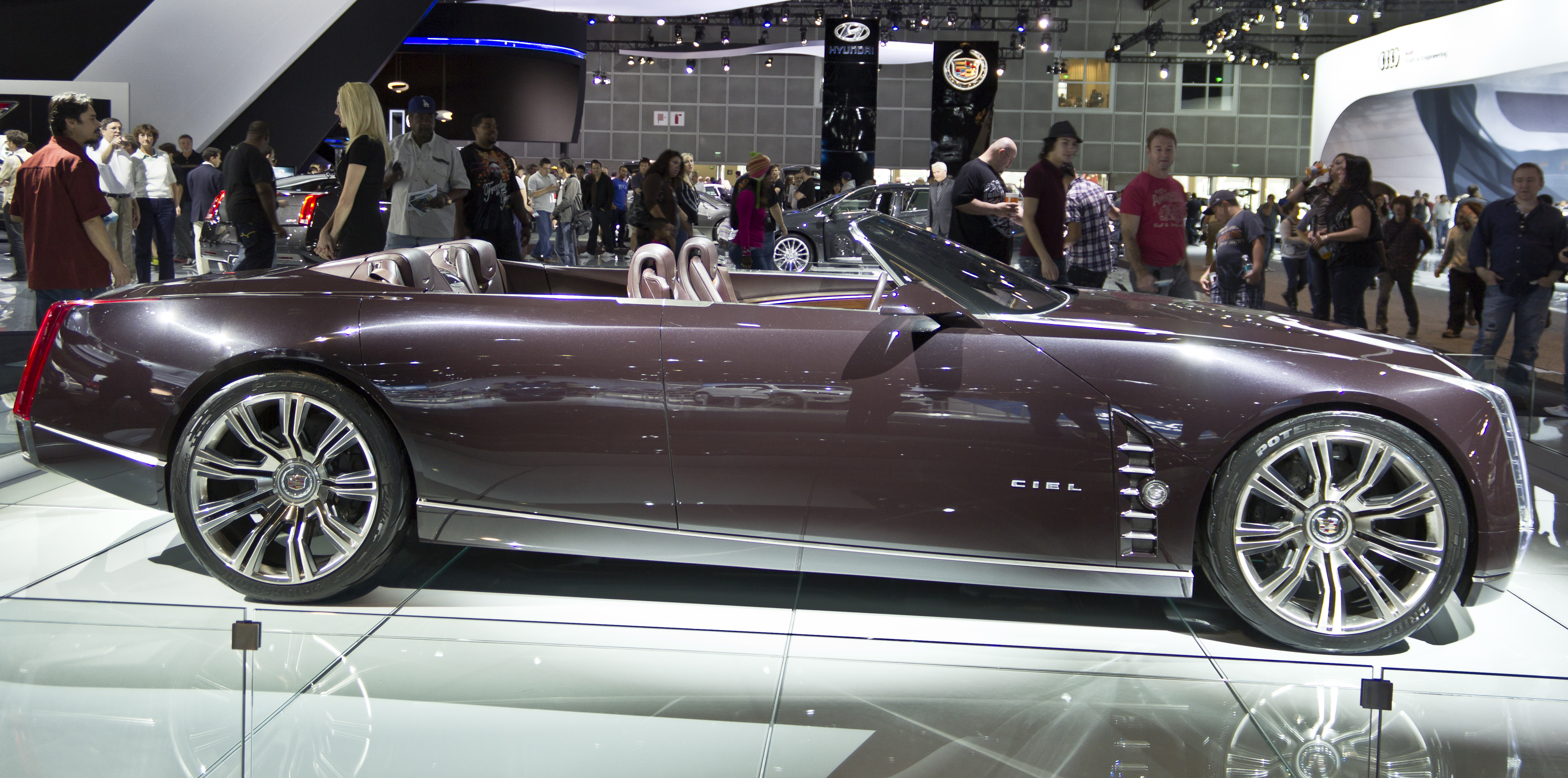
Side view

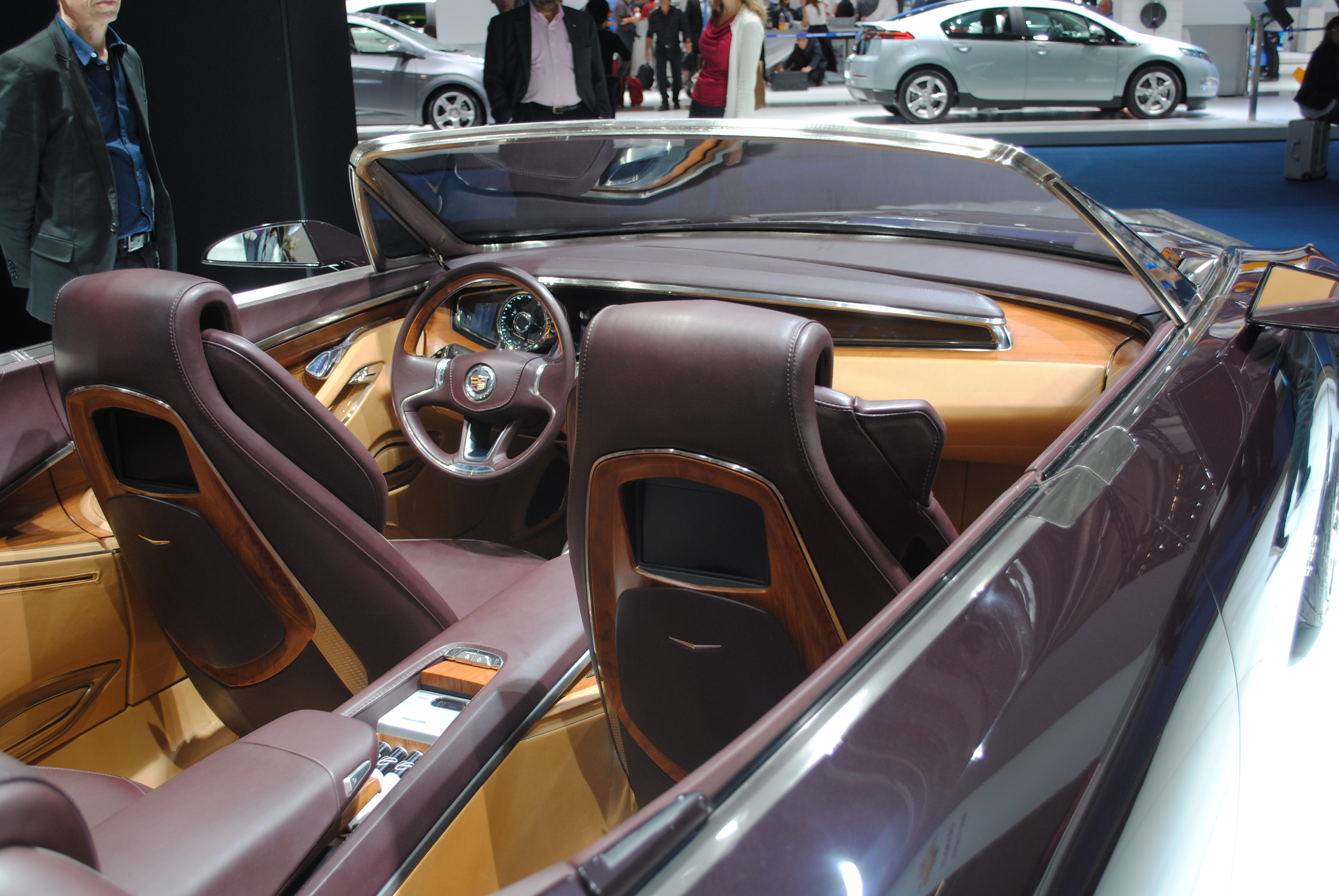
Interior

== See also ==
- Cadillac Converj
- Cadillac XLR
