= SAIC-GM =

Joint venture between General Motors and SAIC Motor

SAIC General Motors Corporation Limited
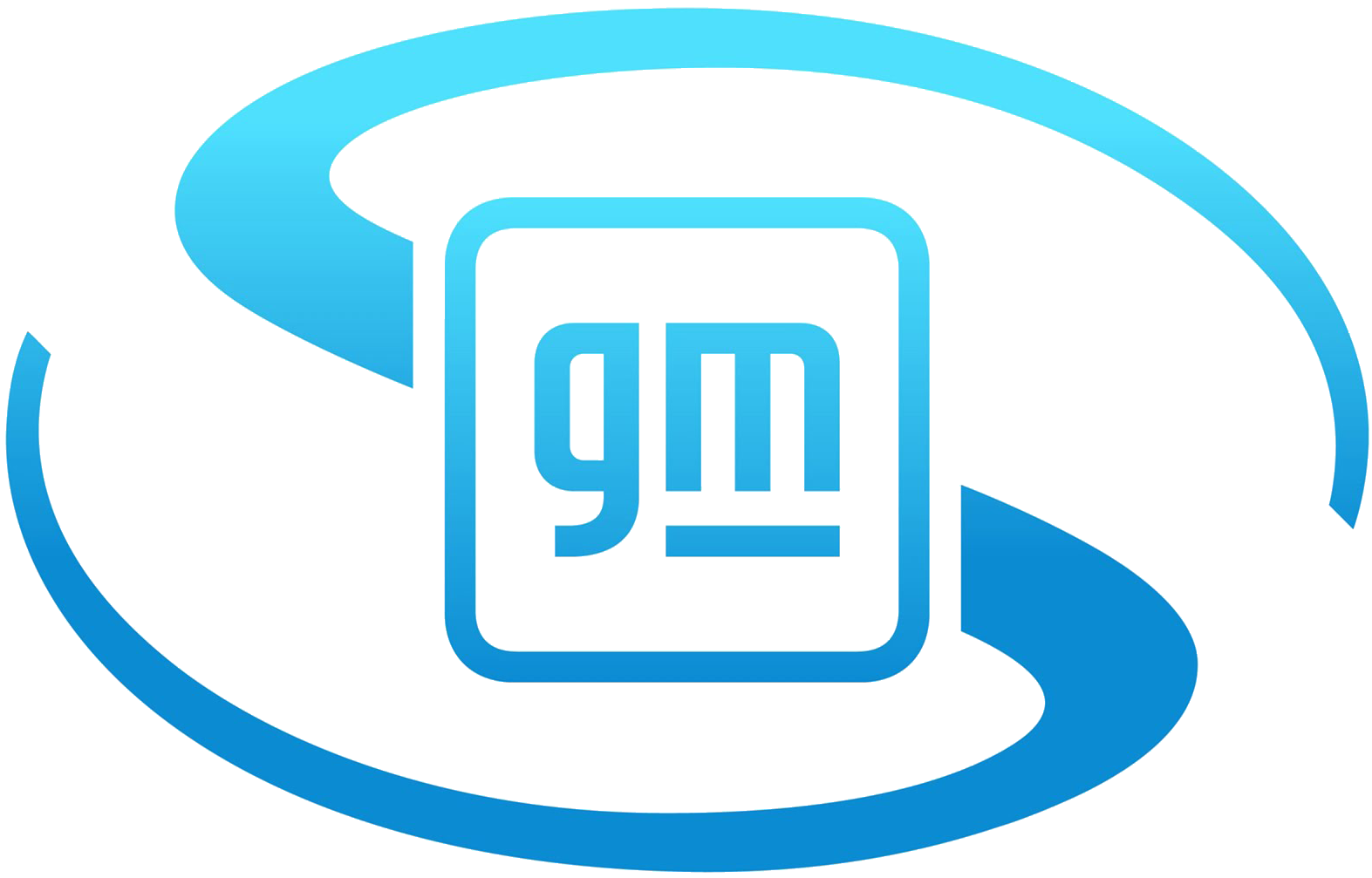
- Logo since 2021

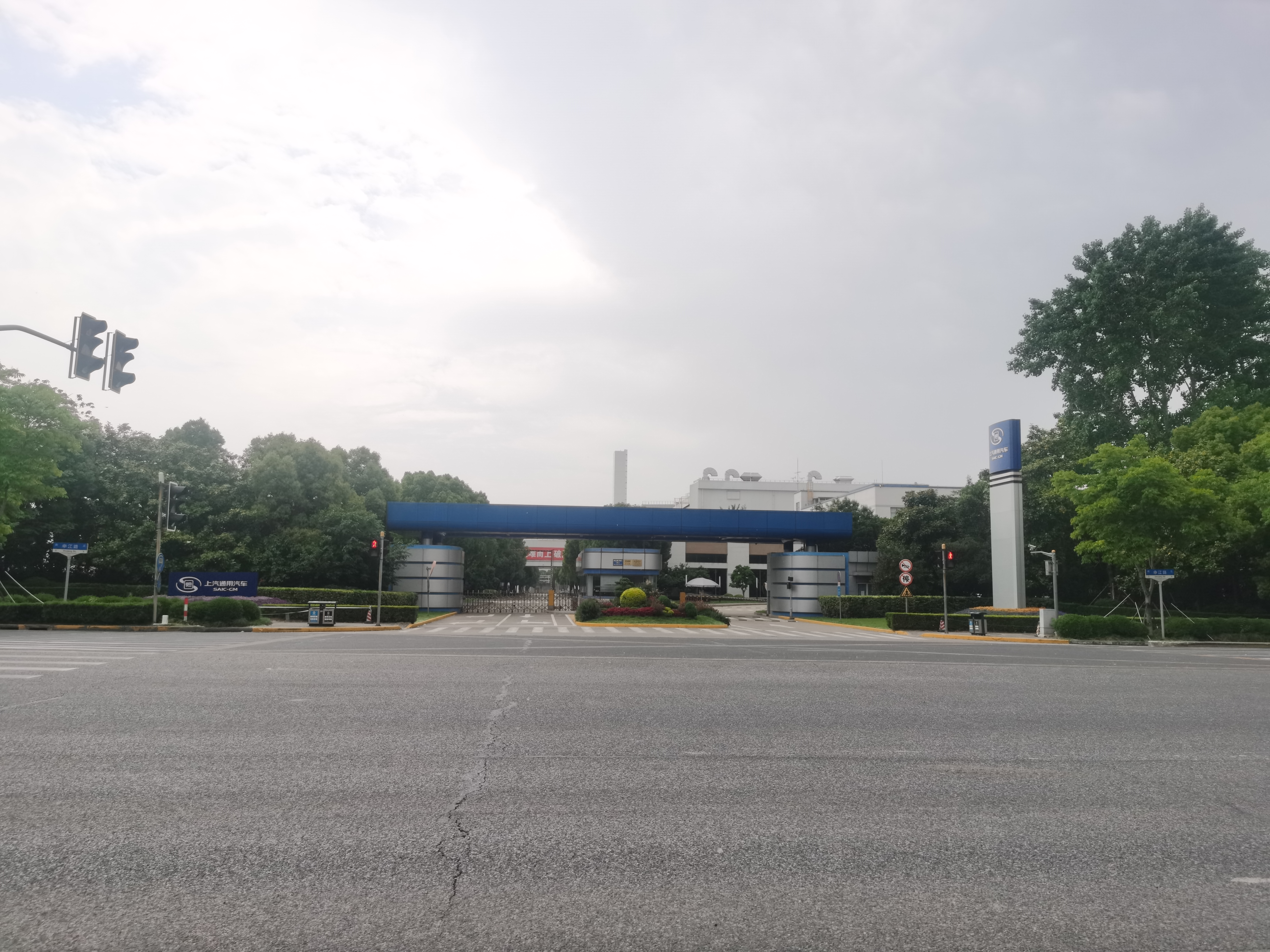
- Headquarters in Jinqiao, Pudong, Shanghai
- Formerly: Shanghai General Motors Company Ltd (1997–2015)
- Type: Joint venture
- Industry: Automotive
- Founded: 12 June 1997; 29 years ago
- Headquarters: Shanghai, China
- Area served: China
- Products: Automobiles
- Production output: ▼562,185 vehicles (2025)
- Brands: Buick; Cadillac; Chevrolet
- Owner: SAIC Motor (50%); General Motors (50%)

Chinese name
- Simplified Chinese: 上汽通用汽车
- Hanyu Pinyin: Shàngqì Tōngyòng Qìchē
- Website: saic-gm.com

SAIC General Motors Corporation Limited (commonly known as SAIC-GM; Chinese: 上汽通用汽车) is a joint venture between General Motors and SAIC Motor. The company was founded in 1997 as Shanghai General Motors Company Ltd or Shanghai GM (Chinese: 上海通用汽车). Headquartered in Shanghai, the company manufactures and sells Chevrolet, Buick, and Cadillac brand automobiles in mainland China, and exports its cars to several overseas markets.

== History ==
SAIC-GM was founded on 12 June 1997, with 50% investment each from each partner. SAIC-GM began assembling the venture's first vehicle, the Buick Regal, in Shanghai, China in April 1999. This later followed with the Chinese-built Buick GL8 minivan which was a Chinese-exclusive vehicle and was not offered in the United States and Canada.

By 2003, China became the second largest single market for General Motors, selling 201,188 vehicles, an 81.6% percent increase over the previous year. In that year SAIC-GM achieved a 13% market share in mainland China, second only to Volkswagen Group China among foreign carmakers. Sales dropped in 2004 when the company retired the Buick Sail and the release of its replacement, the Chevrolet Sail, was delayed to February 2005, knocking General Motors Shanghai to seventh place in mainland China market share. SAIC-GM market share climbed back to nearly 9.8 percent, placing SAIC-GM among the top three passenger car manufacturers in mainland China.

In June 2004, the Cadillac brand was introduced to China followed by Chevrolet in January 2005.

In May 2005 SAIC-GM completed construction of a new assembly plant, the South Plant, at its facility in eastern Shanghai's Pudong district, more than doubling its annual production capacity to 320,000 vehicles.

SAIC-GM was the top passenger vehicle producer in China in 2006, with sales of 413,400 vehicles. In 2011, SAIC-GM sold 1,200,355 vehicles in the Chinese market. SAIC-GM is the largest joint venture GM has in China.

In February 2010, SAIC acquired an additional 1 percent stake in the joint venture for US$85 million and assistance in securing a US$400 million line of credit to boost SAIC's total share of SAIC-GM to 51%. In April 2012, GM regained 50% control of the joint venture.

With the growth of China's electric vehicle industry, SAIC-GM's sales have dropped rapidly. From 2020 to 2024, its sales dropped from 1.4 million to 435,000 vehicles.

In mid-2025, reports emerged that SAIC-GM was removing the Chevrolet brand from the Chinese market. SAIC-GM general manager Lu Xiao stated that “rumors that the Chevrolet brand will withdraw from China are false news”, and “we will not give up Chevrolet”. Three planned models were cancelled: the Equinox, the Equinox EV, and the next-generation Blazer. In August 2026, GM and SAIC extended their joint venture agreement to 2047, sharpening its focus on the Buick and Cadillac brands. SAIC-GM will no longer produce or sell any new Chevrolet models, but it will continue to provide aftersales support for existing cars, while GM will continue to export SAIC-GM-Wuling models to be marketed under the Chevrolet brand.

== Exports ==
In September 2006, General Motors launched the Chevrolet Corsa Plus in Chile built by SAIC-GM, an export version of the first-generation Chevrolet Sail which in turn is a version of the 4-door Opel Corsa with a 1.6-liter engine. It is the first export market to receive a vehicle manufactured by SAIC-GM.

In 2010, SAIC-GM started exporting the second-generation Chevrolet Sail to Latin American markets, starting with Chile. The third-generation Sail or Aveo, also built by SAIC-GM, was exported to Mexico and the Caribbean since 2017 until 2023, when SAIC-GM-Wuling took over the development and production of the Sail/Aveo.

In 2016, General Motors started importing the Buick Envision into the US from China. The Envision is built by SAIC-GM at its Dongyue Motors plant. Buick expected to sell 40,000 to 50,000 units of the Envision annually in North America.

Since 2020, SAIC-GM also exports the Chevrolet Equinox to Uzbekistan. SAIC-GM also assisted UzAuto Motors, the largest Uzbek automaker formerly known as GM Uzbekistan to produce Chevrolet vehicles such as the Onix.

== Facilities ==
Name	City	Opened	Description	Current products
SAIC-GM	Jinqiao, Pudong district, Shanghai	1998	Occupies an area of 5,920,200 sq ft (550,000 m^{2}). There are 3 vehicle production plants (North, South, & East). North was the original plant built in 1998. South began production in 2005. The East or Cadillac plant began production in 2016.	Cadillac CT5; Cadillac CT6; Cadillac XT4; Cadillac XT5; Cadillac XT6; Chevrolet Malibu XL; Buick GL8 ES/Avenir (Mk III); Buick GL8 Century (Mk IV); Buick LaCrosse; Buick Regal (E2XX); Engines; Engine components; Transmissions; Ultium batteries
SAIC-GM Dongyue Motors Co., Ltd.	Yantai, Shandong	2001	Originally founded in 2001 as Yantai Bodyshop Corp. which built Daewoo vehicles (Daewoo Lanos) under license from Daewoo Motor Co. SAIC-GM took over the plant in 2002. There are two vehicle production plants, North and South. SAIC-GM Dongyue Motors joint venture is owned 50% by SAIC-GM, 25% by GM China, & 25% by SAIC.	Buick Envision
SAIC-GM Dongyue Powertrain Co., Ltd.	Yantai, Shandong	1999	Originally founded in 1999 as Shandong Daewoo Automotive Engine Co., Ltd., a 50/50 joint venture between Daewoo Motors and Chinese partners owned by the Shandong provincial government. SAIC-GM took over the plant in 2005. The joint venture is owned 50% by SAIC-GM, 25% by GM China, & 25% by SAIC.	Engines; Transmissions including: 6T30/6T40/6T45/6T50, CVT; Past Engines: Family I, Gen 3 engine
SAIC-GM Wuhan Branch	Wuhan, Hubei	2015	Past models: Chevrolet Cavalier	Chevrolet Equinox; Chevrolet Monza; Chevrolet Menlo; Buick Verano Pro; Buick Velite 6; Buick Electra E5; Buick Electra E7; Buick Electra L7; Cadillac Optiq; Engines

== Former facilities ==
Name	City	Opened	Closed	Description	Former products
SAIC-GM (Shenyang) Norsom Motors Co., Ltd.	Shenyang, Liaoning	1992	2025	Originally founded in 1992 as Jinbei GM Automotive Co. Ltd., a 30/70 joint venture between GM & Shenyang Jinbei Automotive. Restructured into a 50/50 joint venture between GM & Jinbei in 1998. SAIC-GM took over the joint venture in 2004, buying out Jinbei. The new SAIC-GM Norsom Motors joint venture is owned 50% by SAIC-GM, 25% by GM China, & 25% by SAIC. It has three phases of buildings.	Chevrolet Tracker; Buick GL8 Legacy (Mk II); Engines

== Related businesses ==
SAIC and GM also operated other joint ventures, including:

- Pan Asia Technical Automotive Center Co., Ltd. (PATAC), an engineering services and research and development (R&D) operations centered in China
- Shanghai OnStar Telematics Co., Ltd., the operator of OnStar services in China
- SAIC General Motors Sales Co., Ltd., a national sales company. GM China has a 49 percent stake and SAIC a 51 percent stake.
- SAIC-GMAC Automotive Finance Co., Ltd. (SAIC-GMAC), a financing arm
- Shanghai Chengxin Used Car Operation and Management Co., Ltd., a joint venture established by GM China, SAIC-GM and SAIC subsidiary Shanghai Automotive Industry Sales Co. Ltd.
- SAIC-GM-Wuling, a separate manufacturing and sales joint venture using Wuling and Baojun brands

== Leadership ==
- Chen Hong (1997–2005)
- Ding Lei (2005–2010)
- Wang Xiaoqiu (2010–2014)
- Wang Yongqing (2014–2023)
- Zhuang Jingxiong (2023–2024)
- Lu Xiao (2024–present)

== Current models ==
=== Buick ===
- Century
- Electra E5
- Electra L7
- Electra E7
- Electra Encasa
- Envision Plus
- Envision S
- GL8
- LaCrosse
- Regal (Note: based on Opel Insignia)
- Regal GS (Note: sports variant)
- Velite 6
- Verano
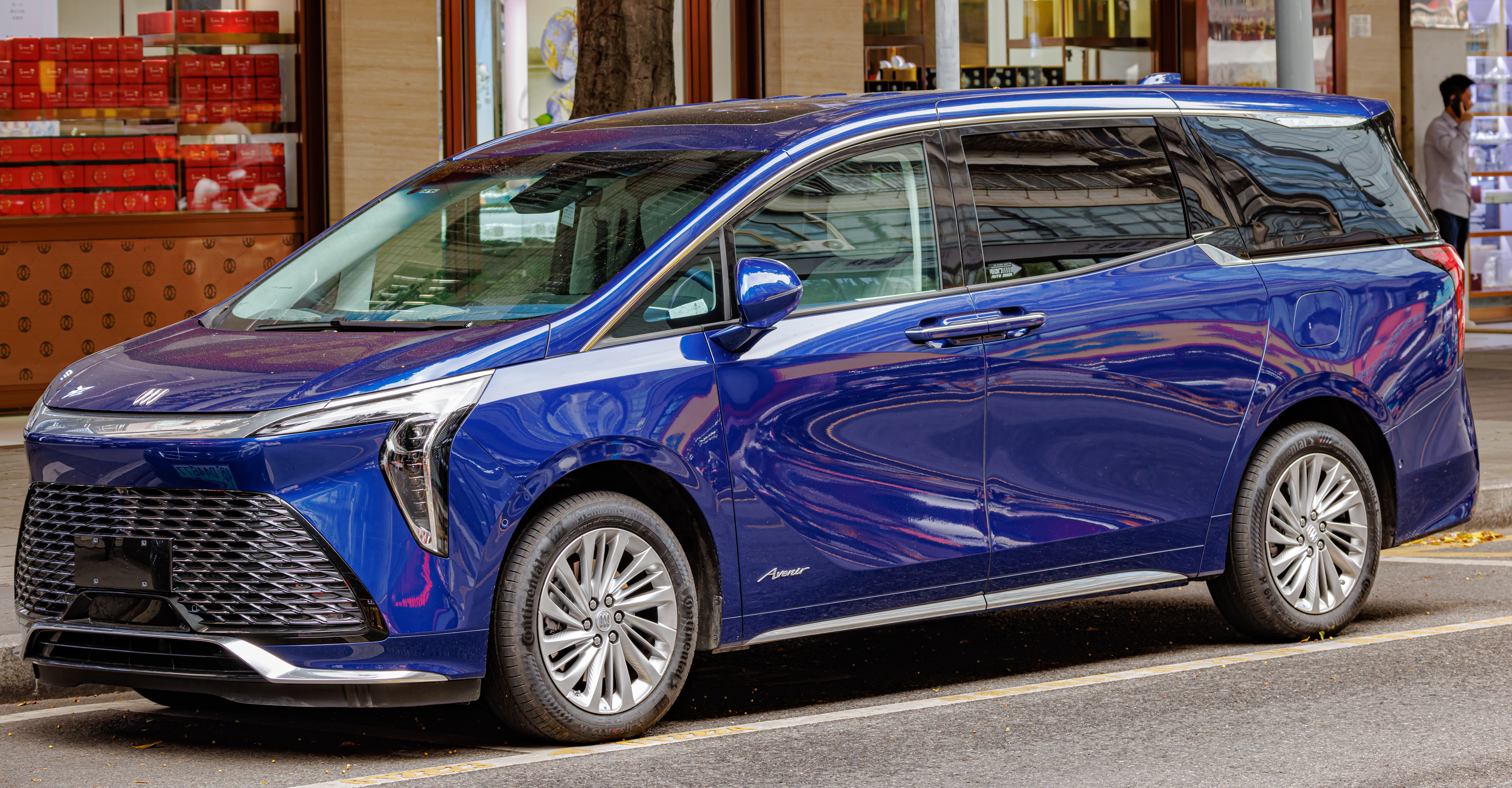
Buick Century

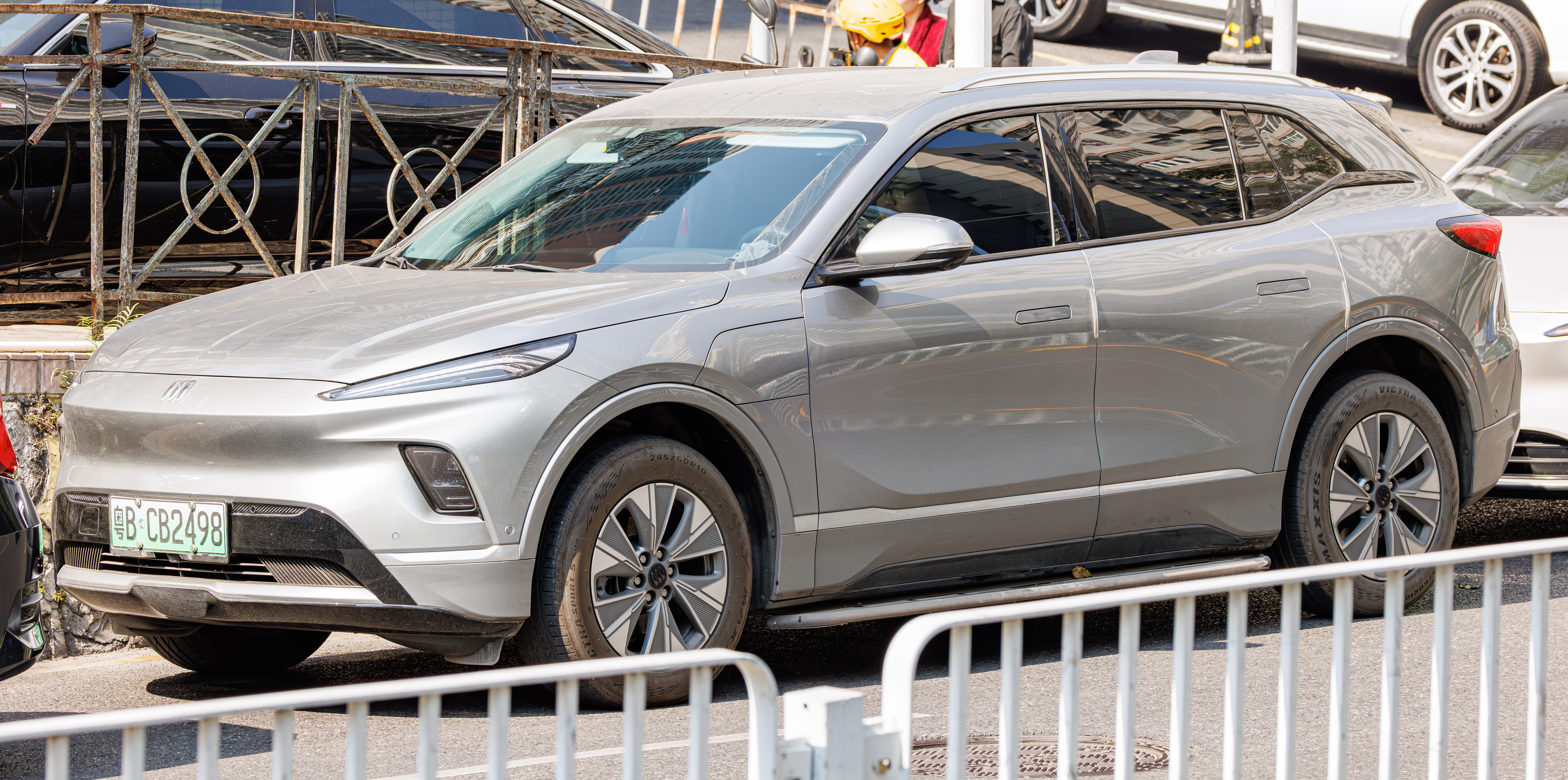
Buick Electra E5

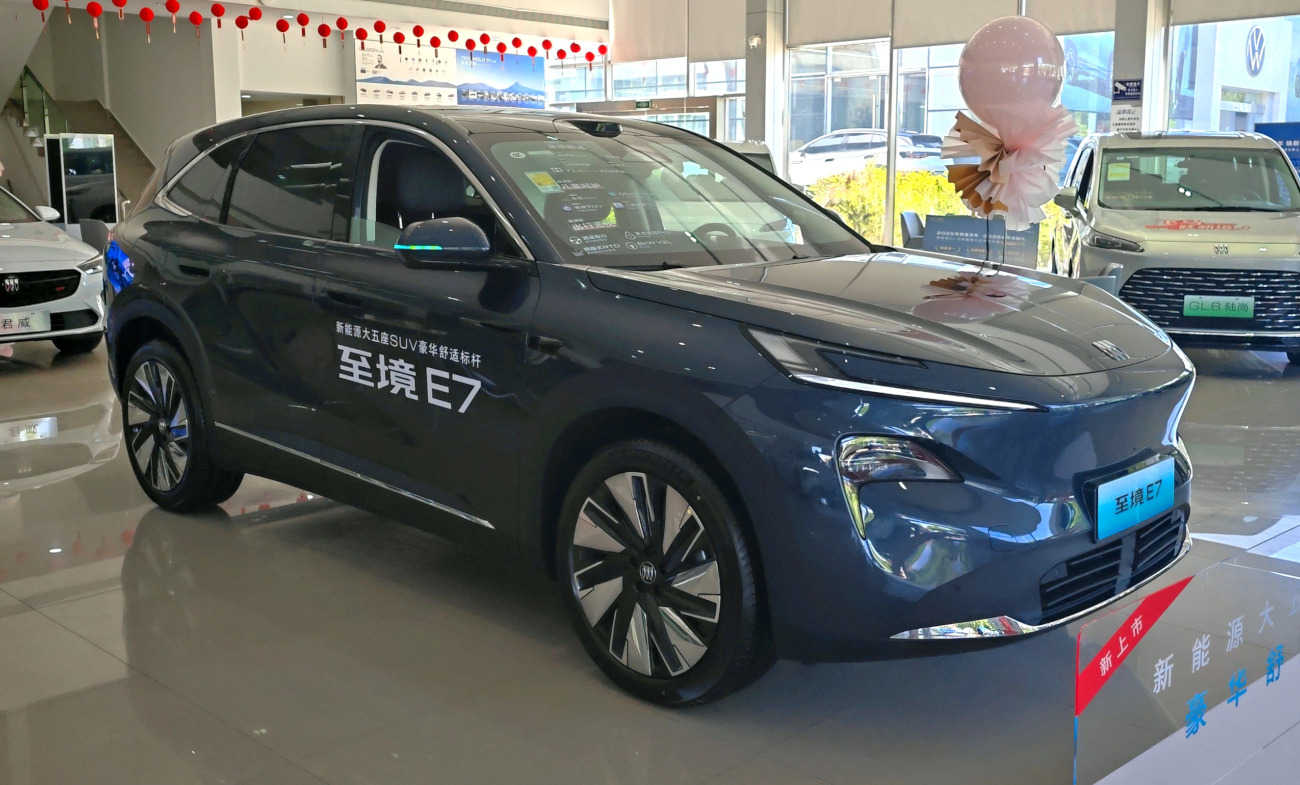
Buick Electra E7

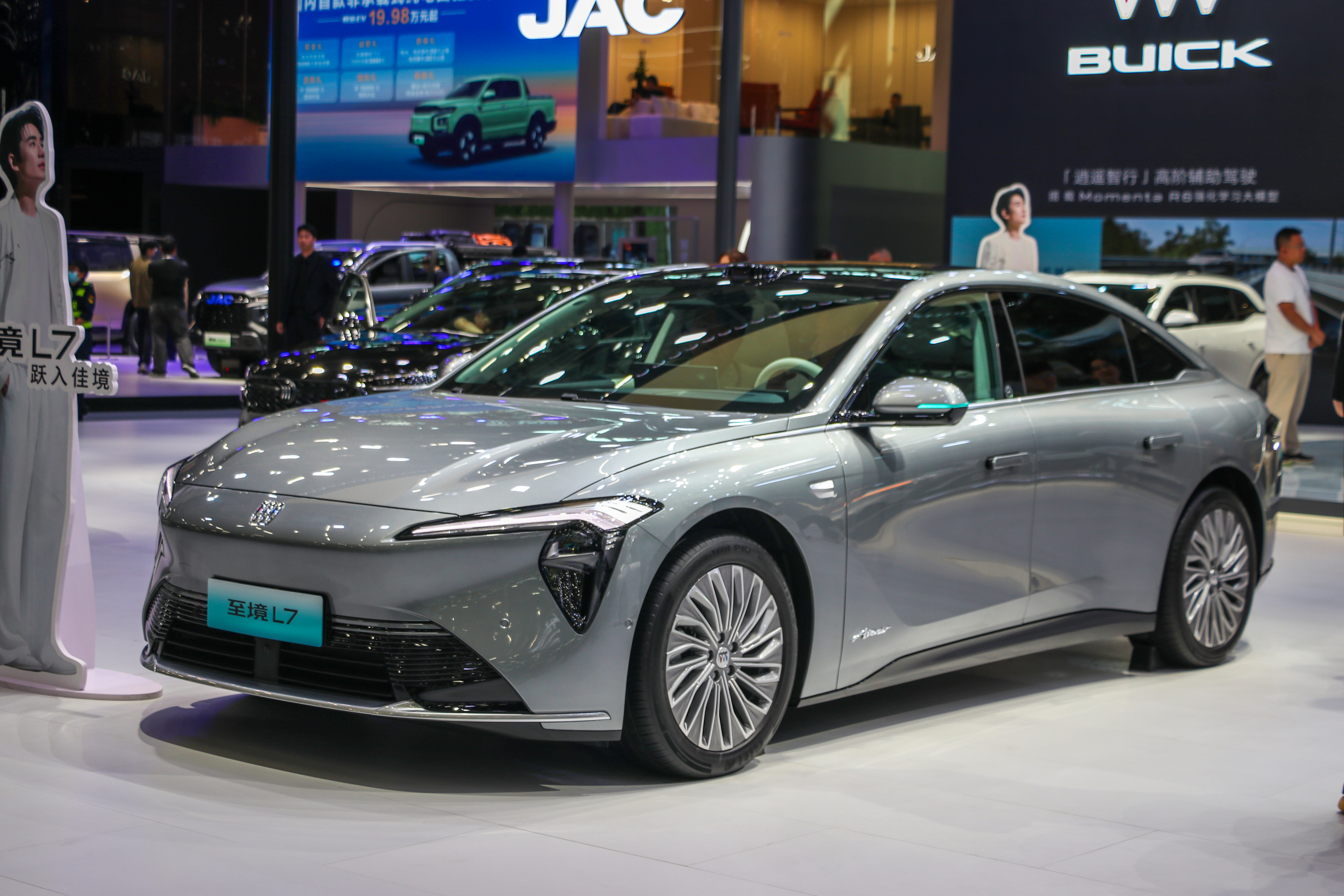
Buick Electra L7

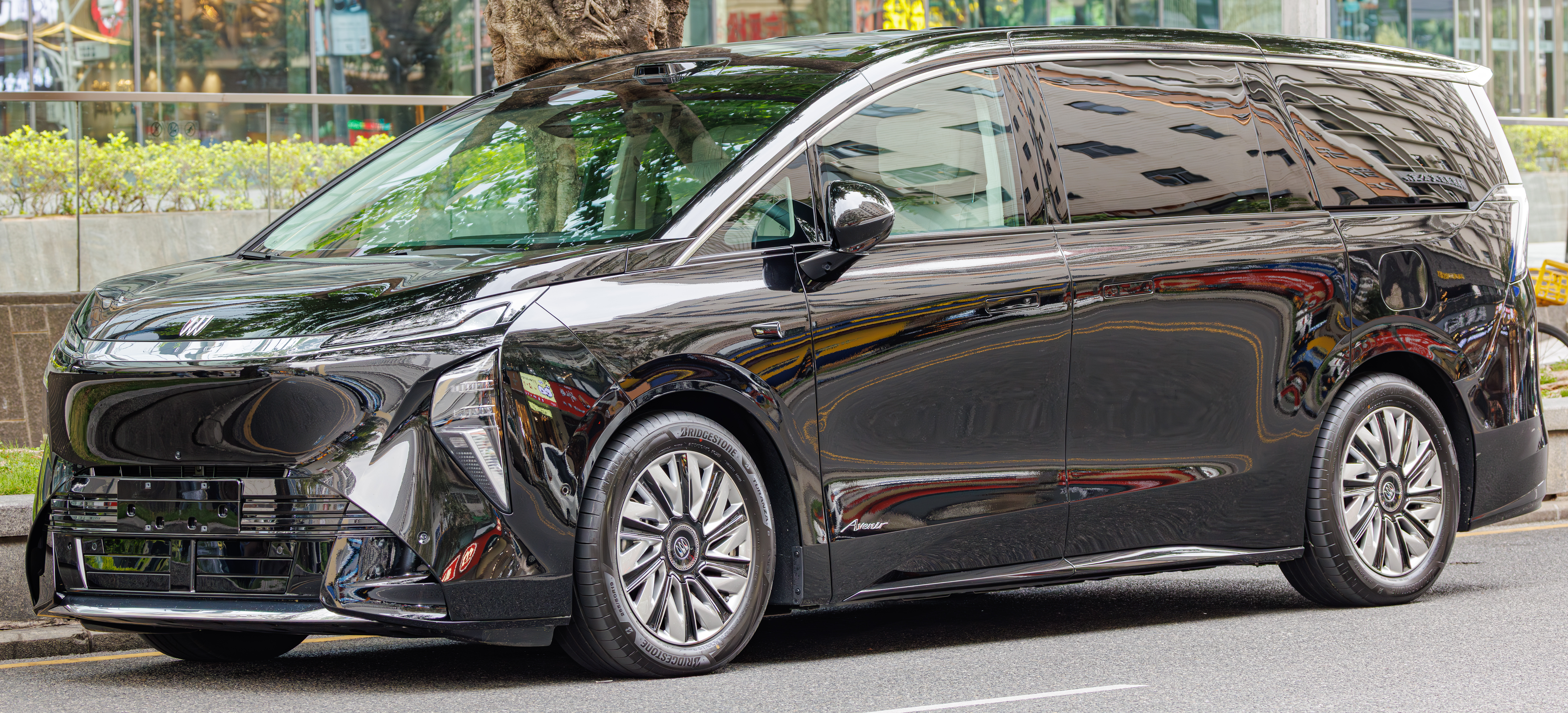
Buick Electra Encasa

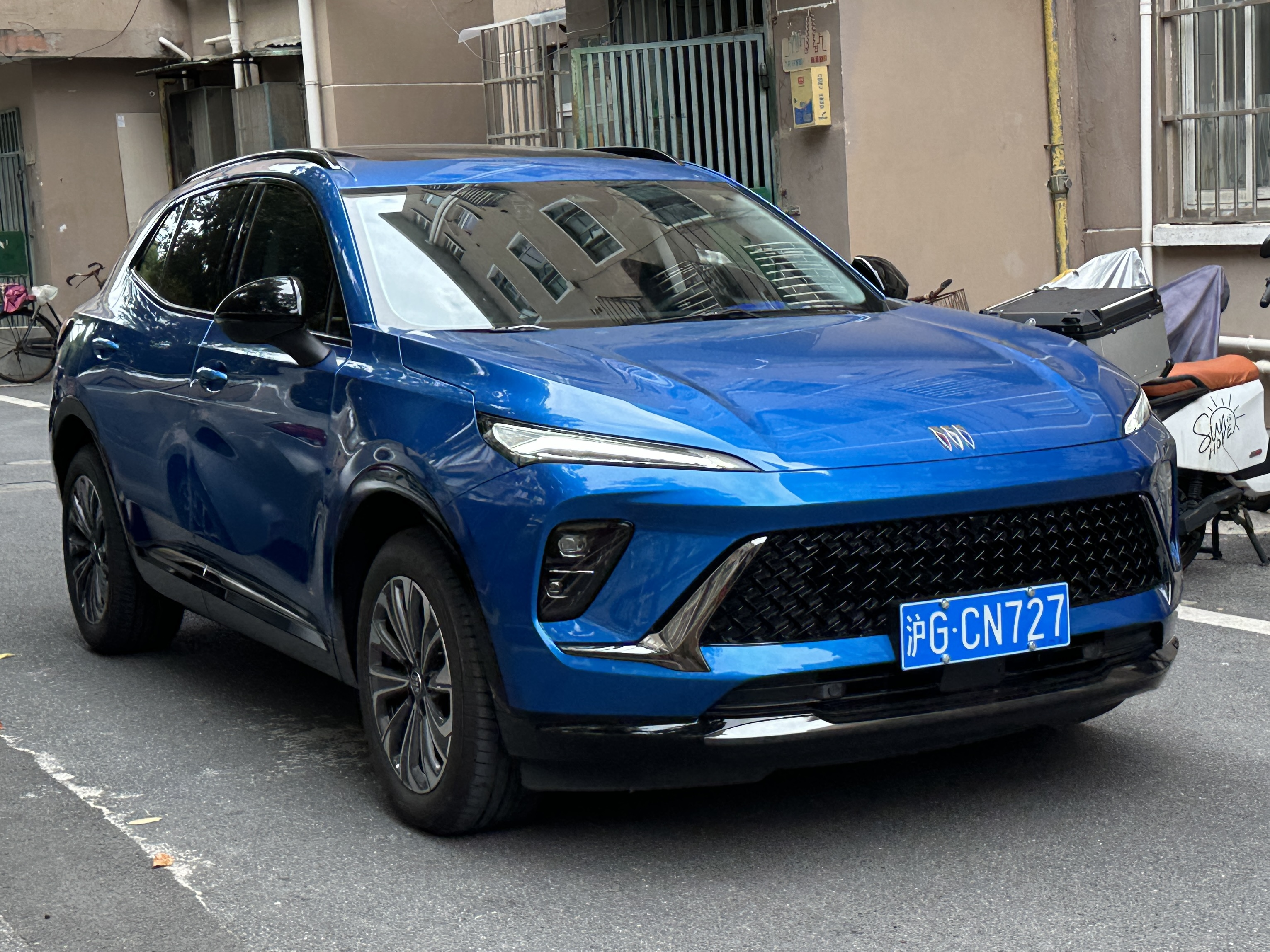
Buick Envision S

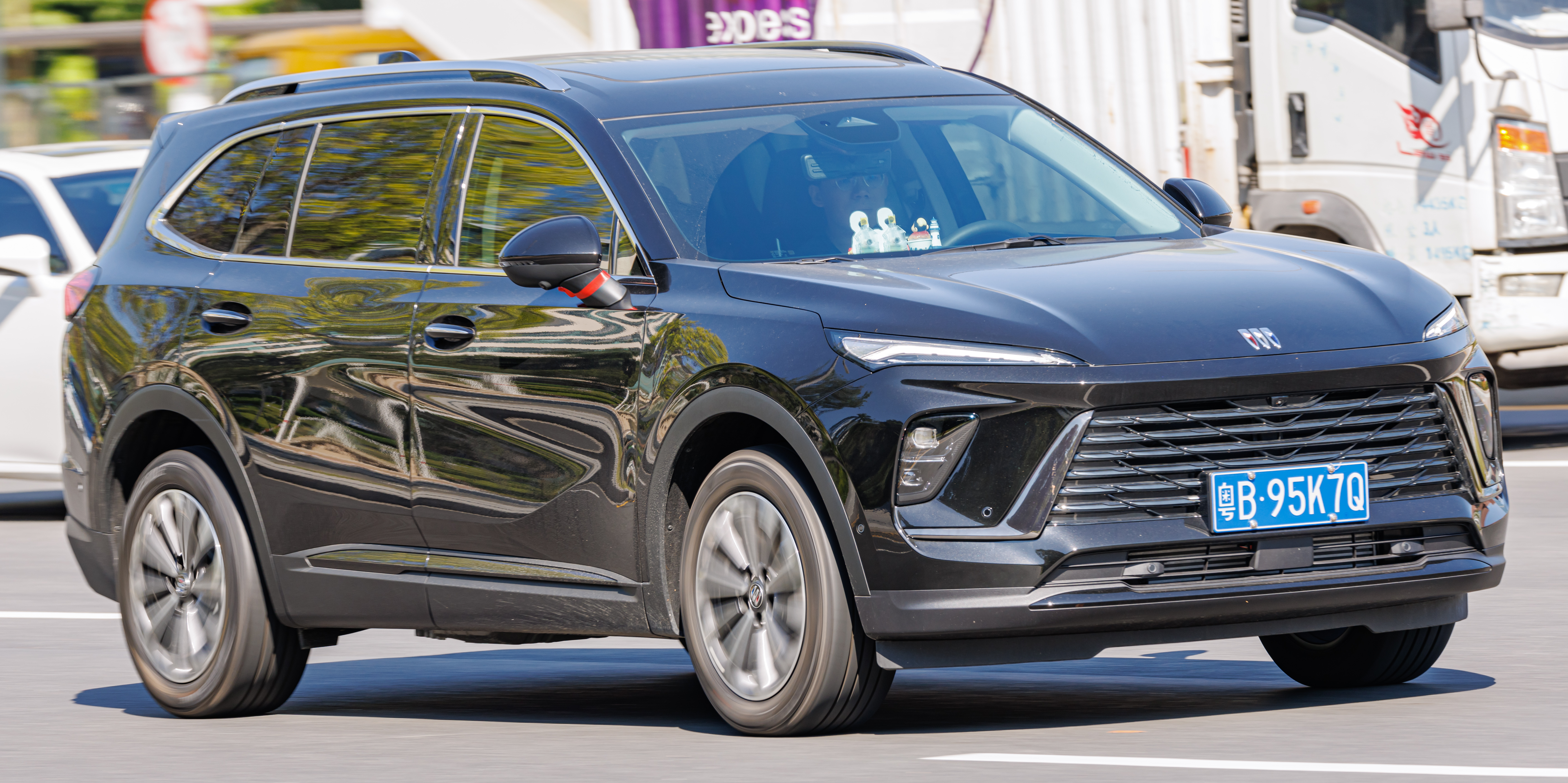
Buick Envision Plus

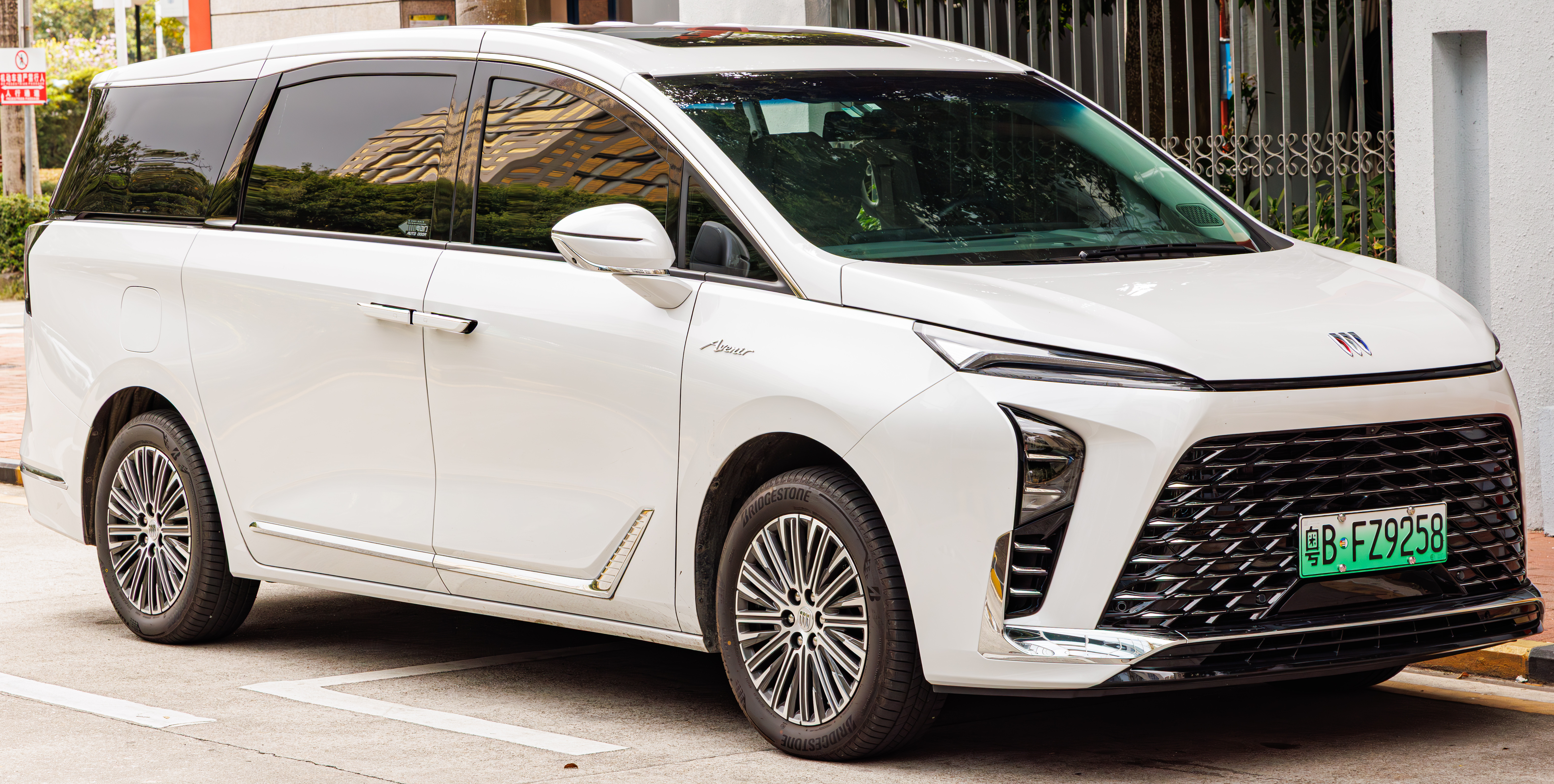
Buick GL8 Lu Zun PHEV

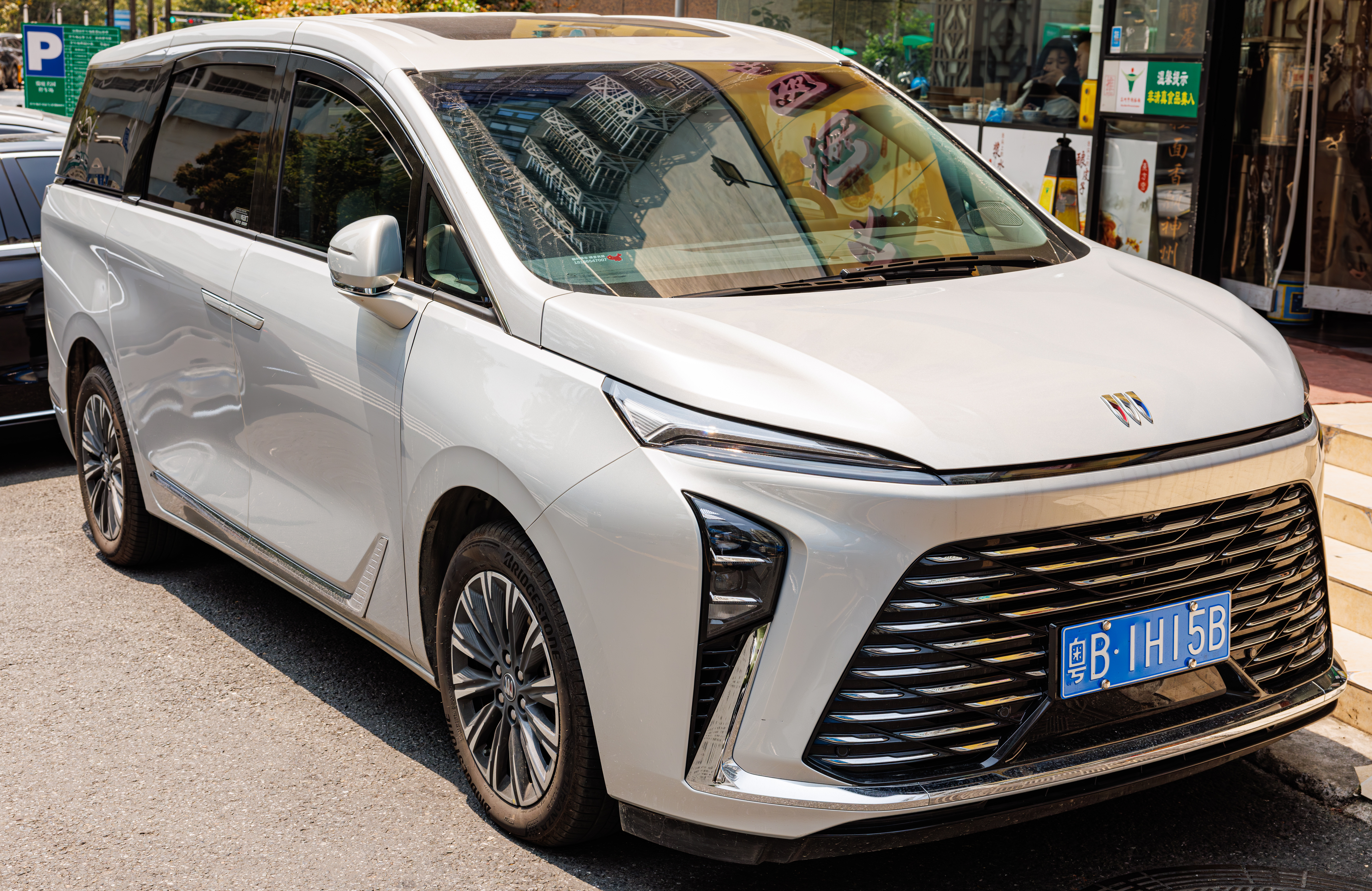
Buick GL8 ES Lu Zun

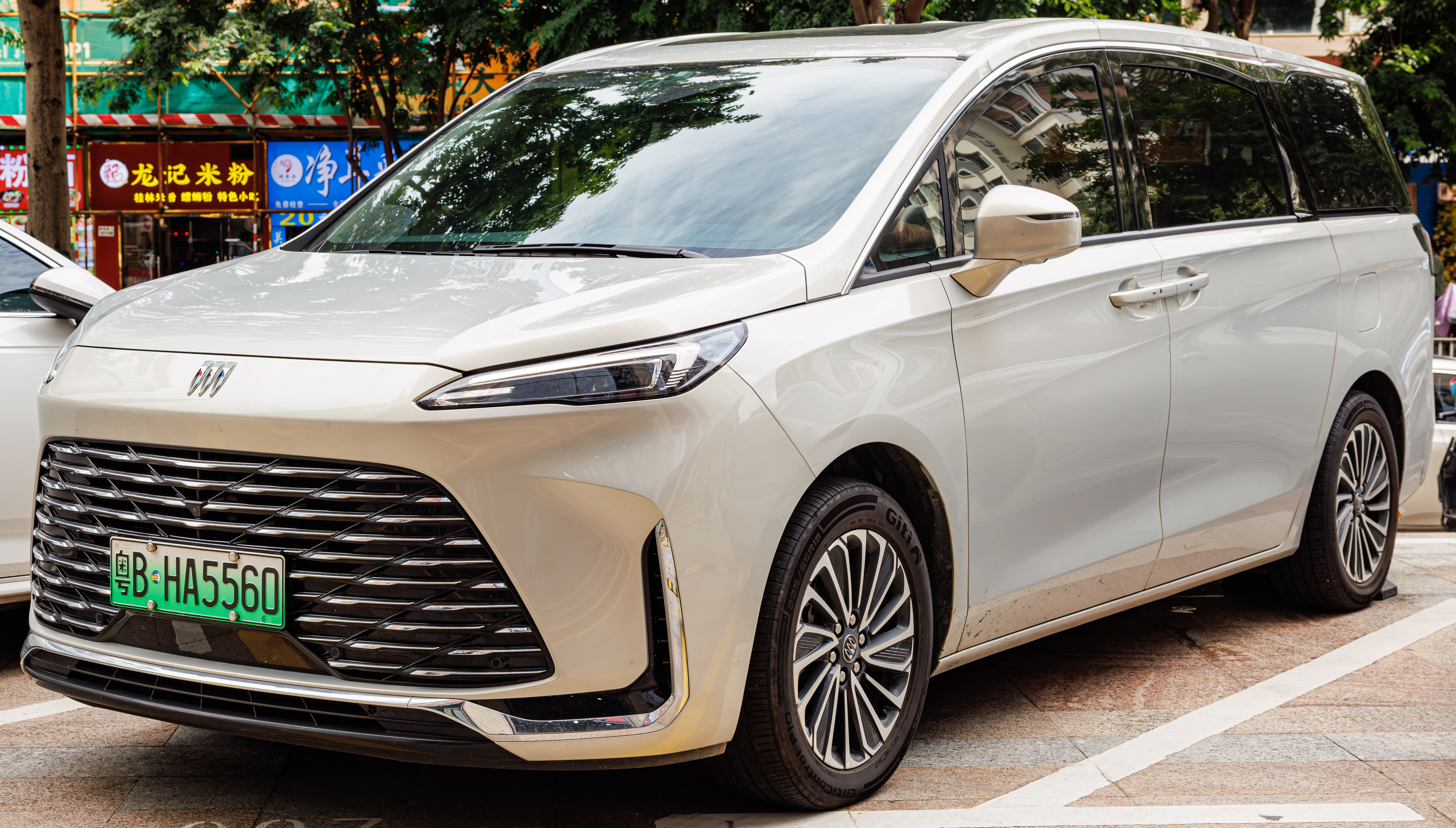
Buick GL8 Lu Shang

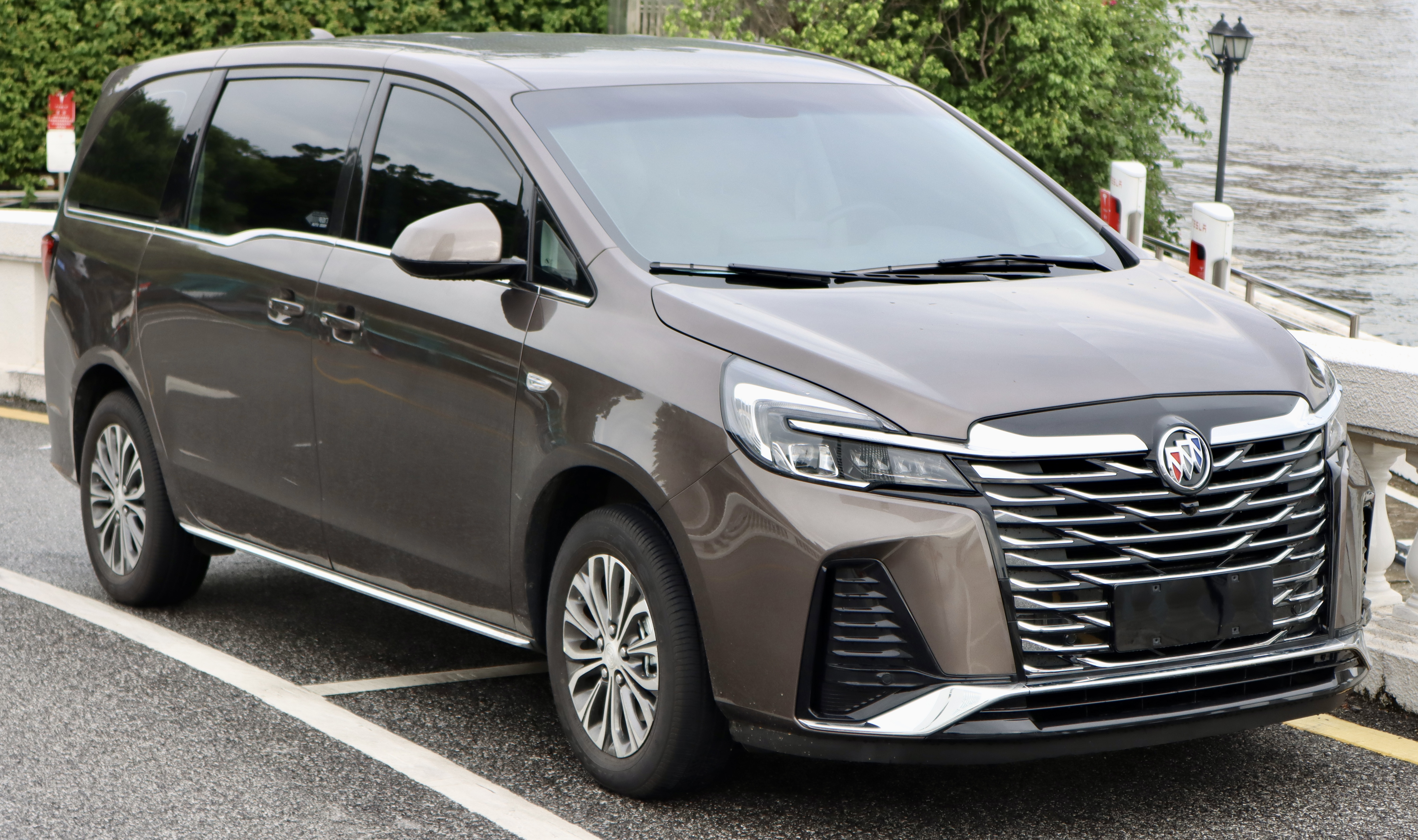
Buick GL8 Onshore Business facelift

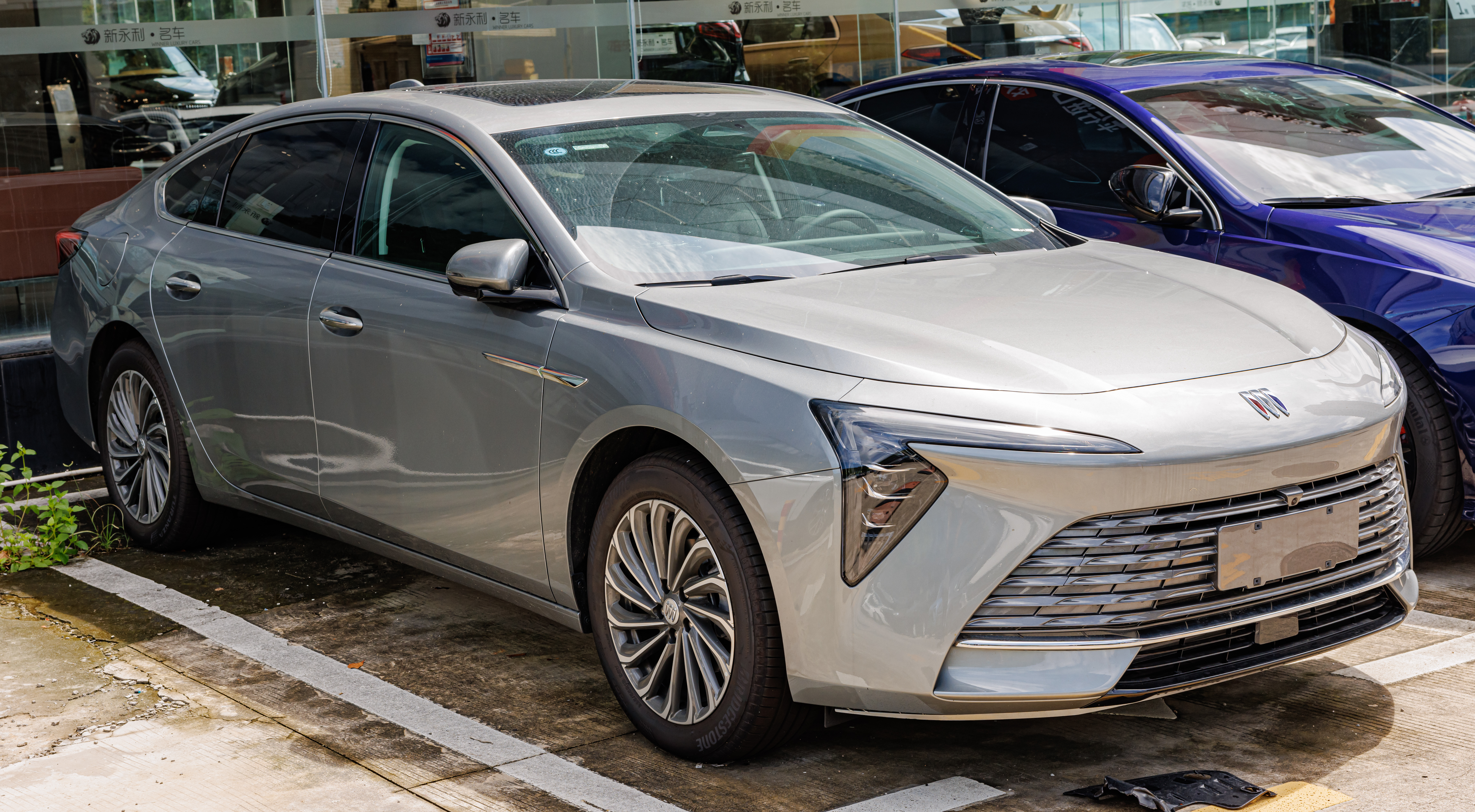
Buick LaCrosse IV

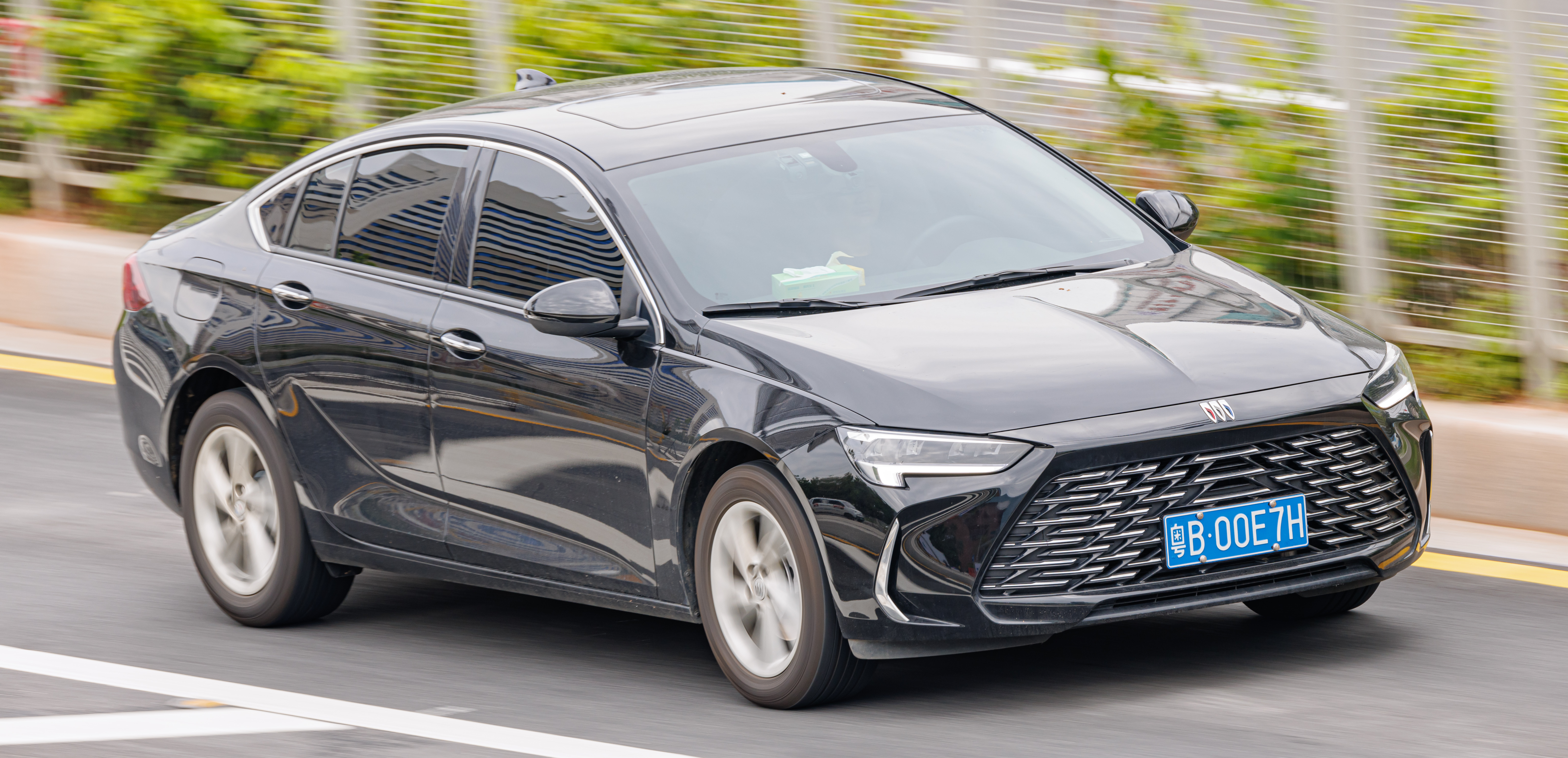
Buick Regal (China, III 2023 facelift)

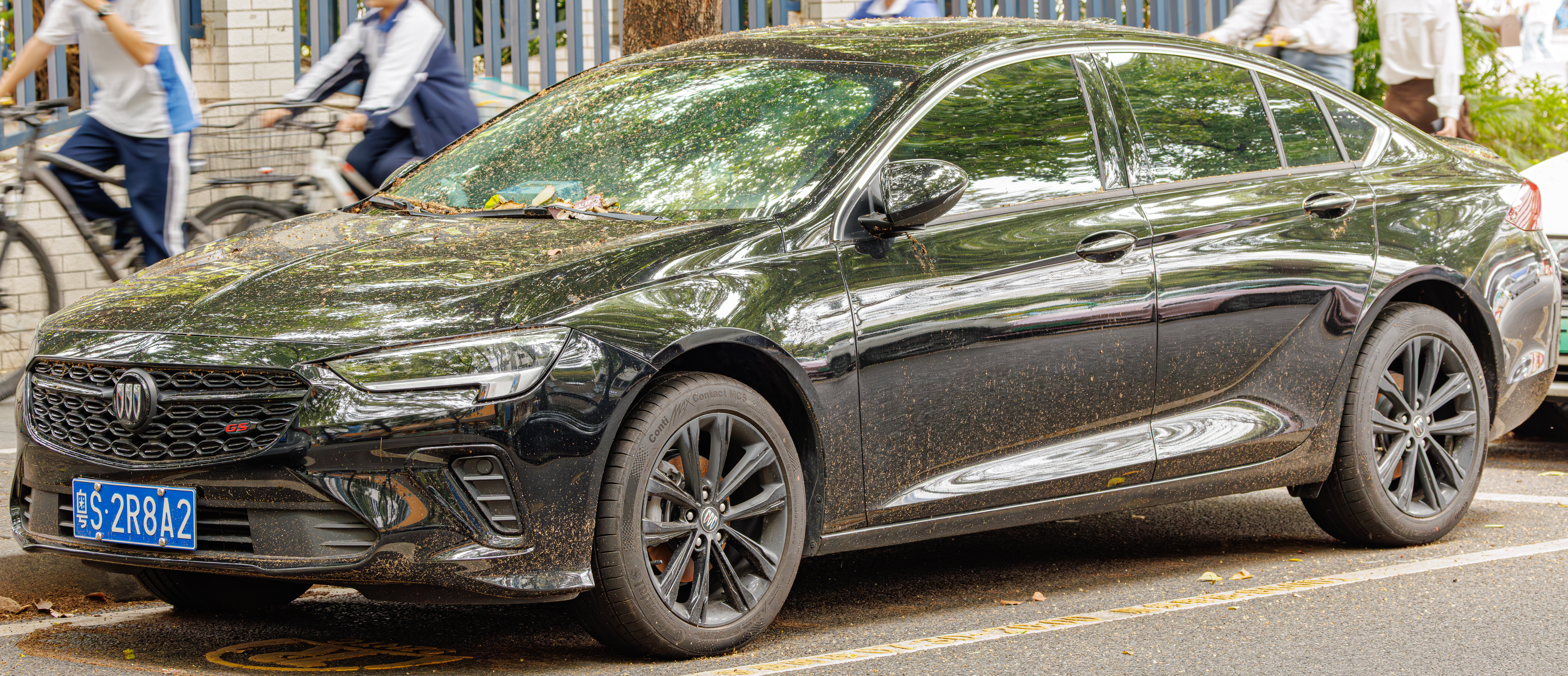
Buick Regal GS (China, III facelift)

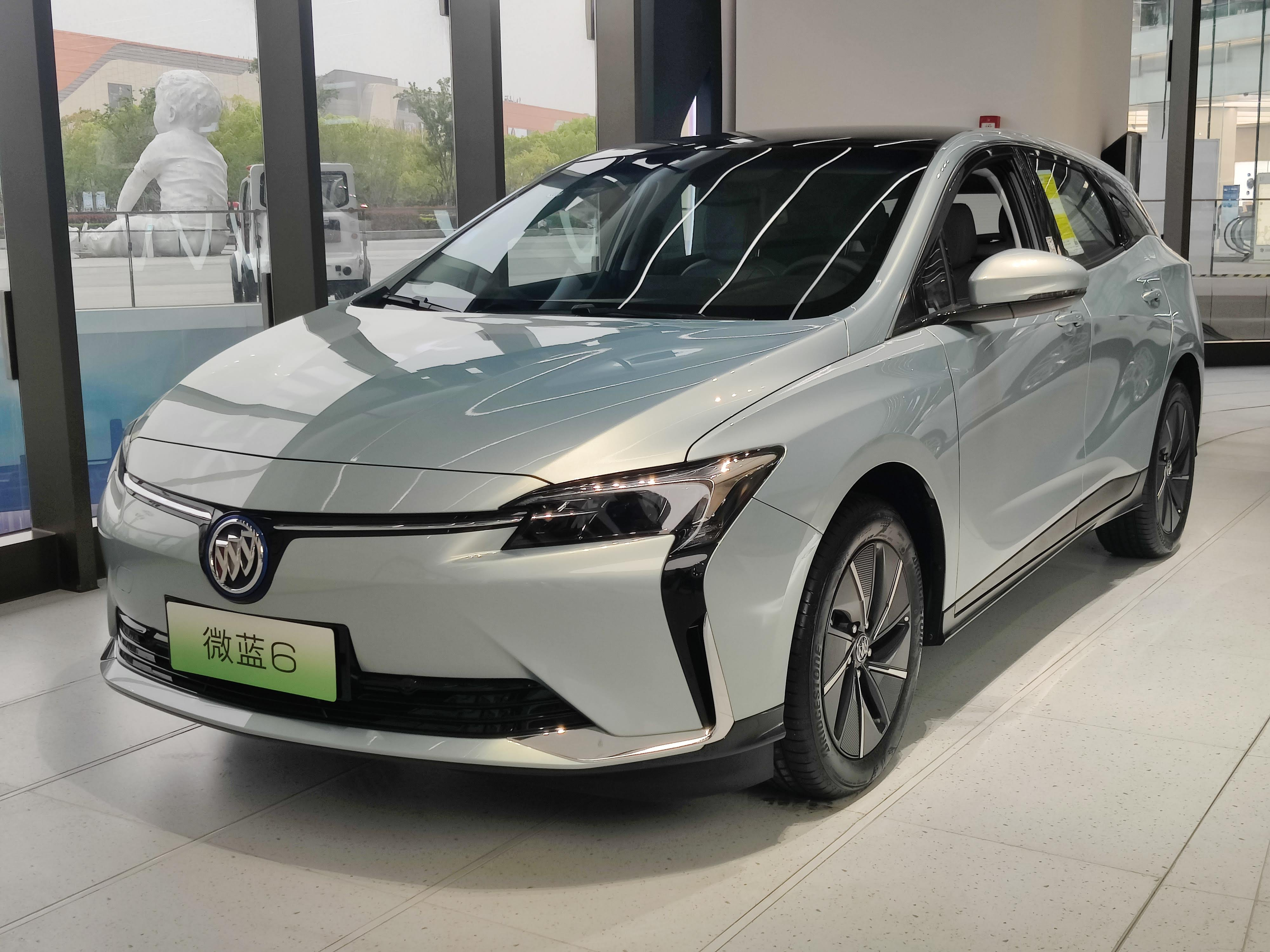
Buick Velite 6 EV

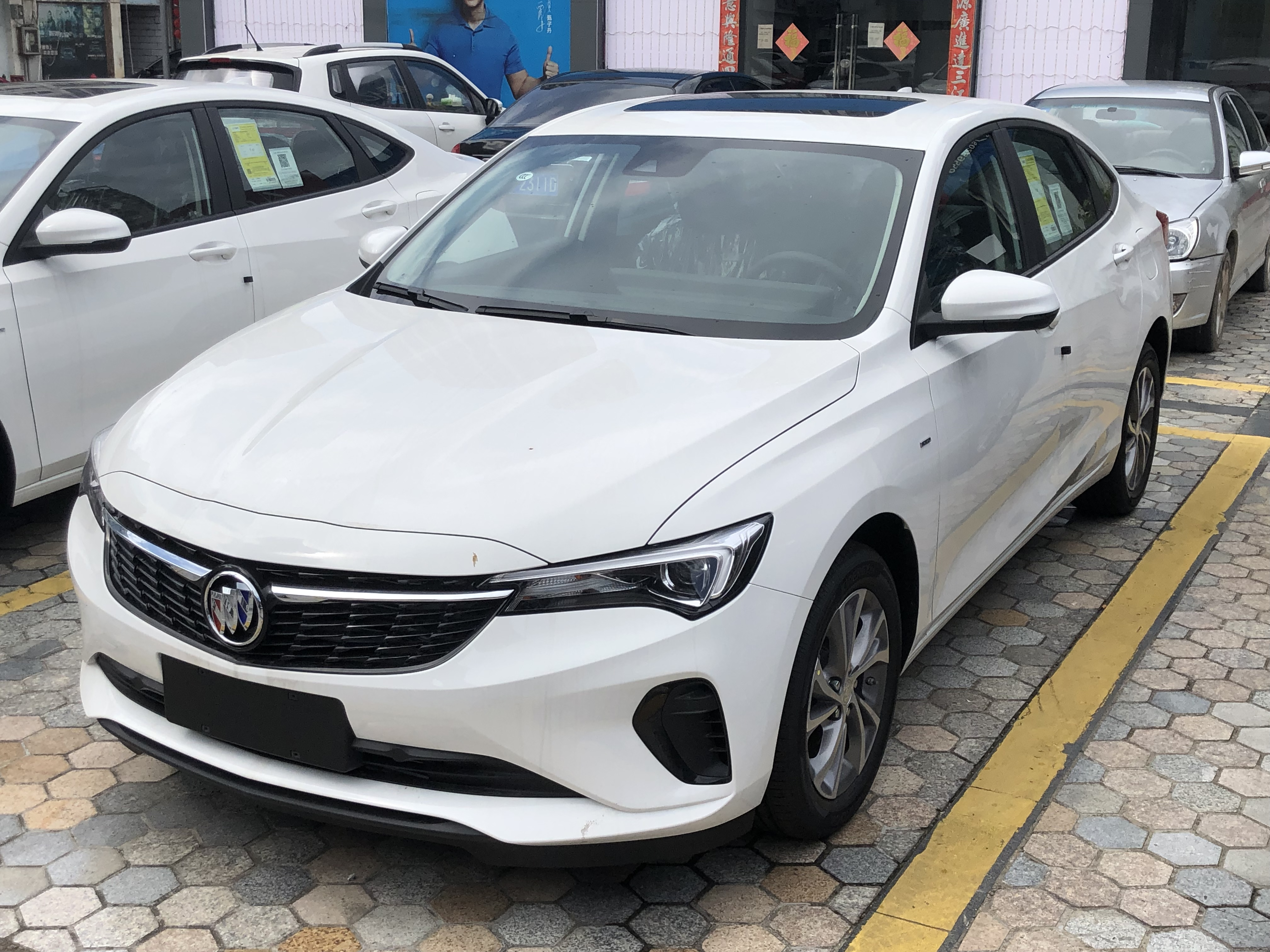
Buick Verano

=== Cadillac ===
- CT5
- CT6
- Lyriq
- Vistiq
- XT4
- XT5
- XT6
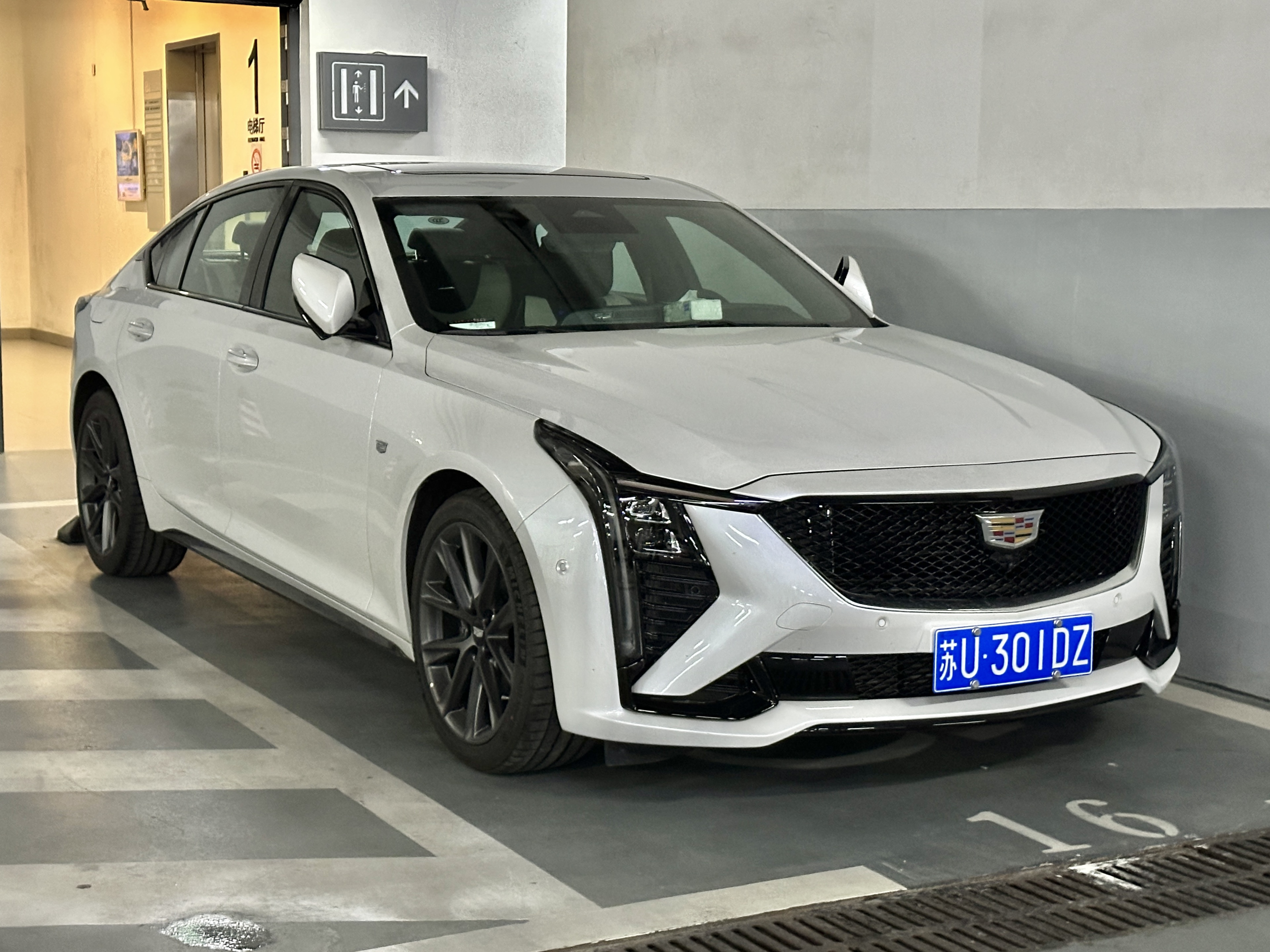
Cadillac CT5

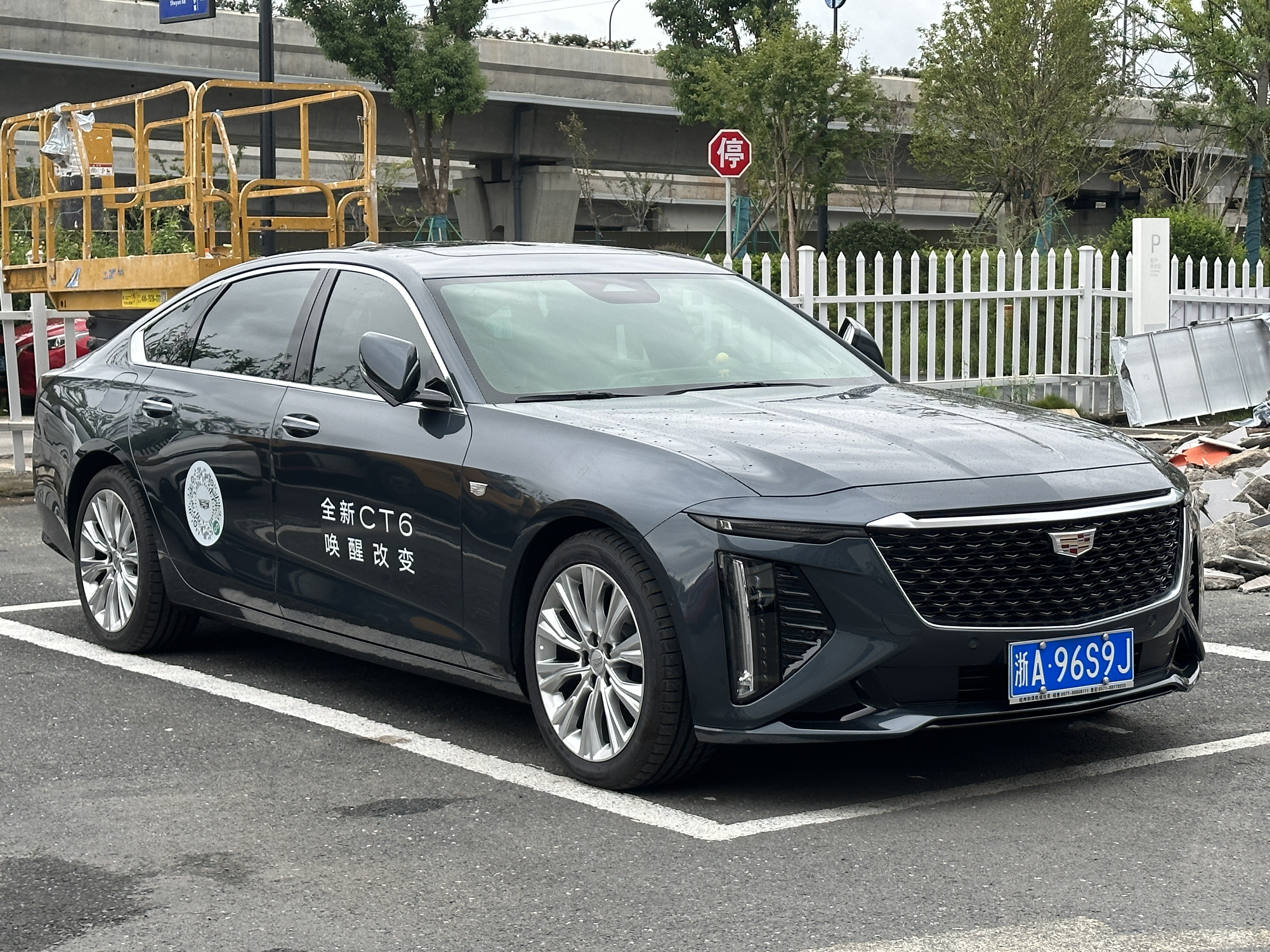
Cadillac CT6

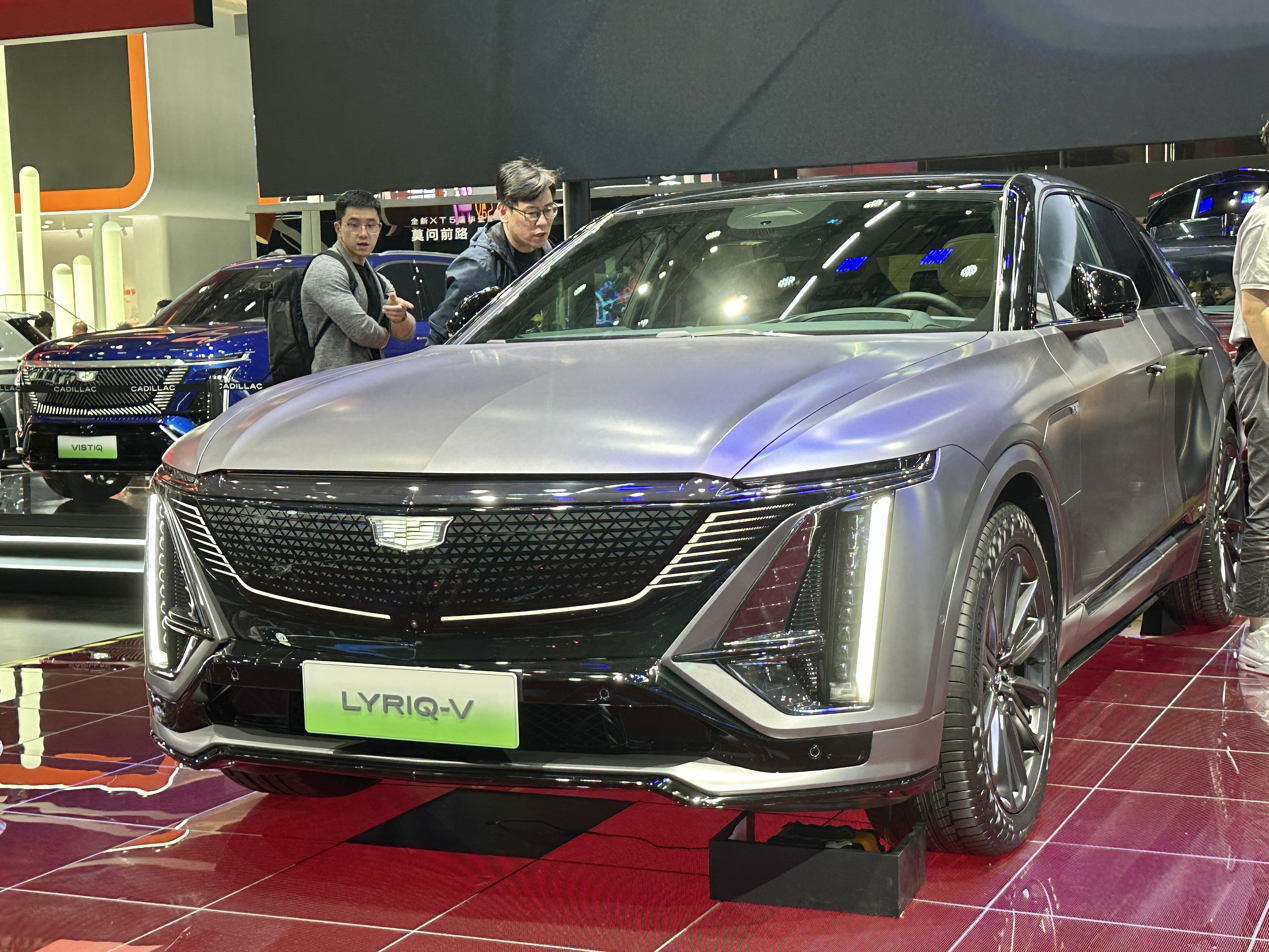
Cadillac Lyriq-V

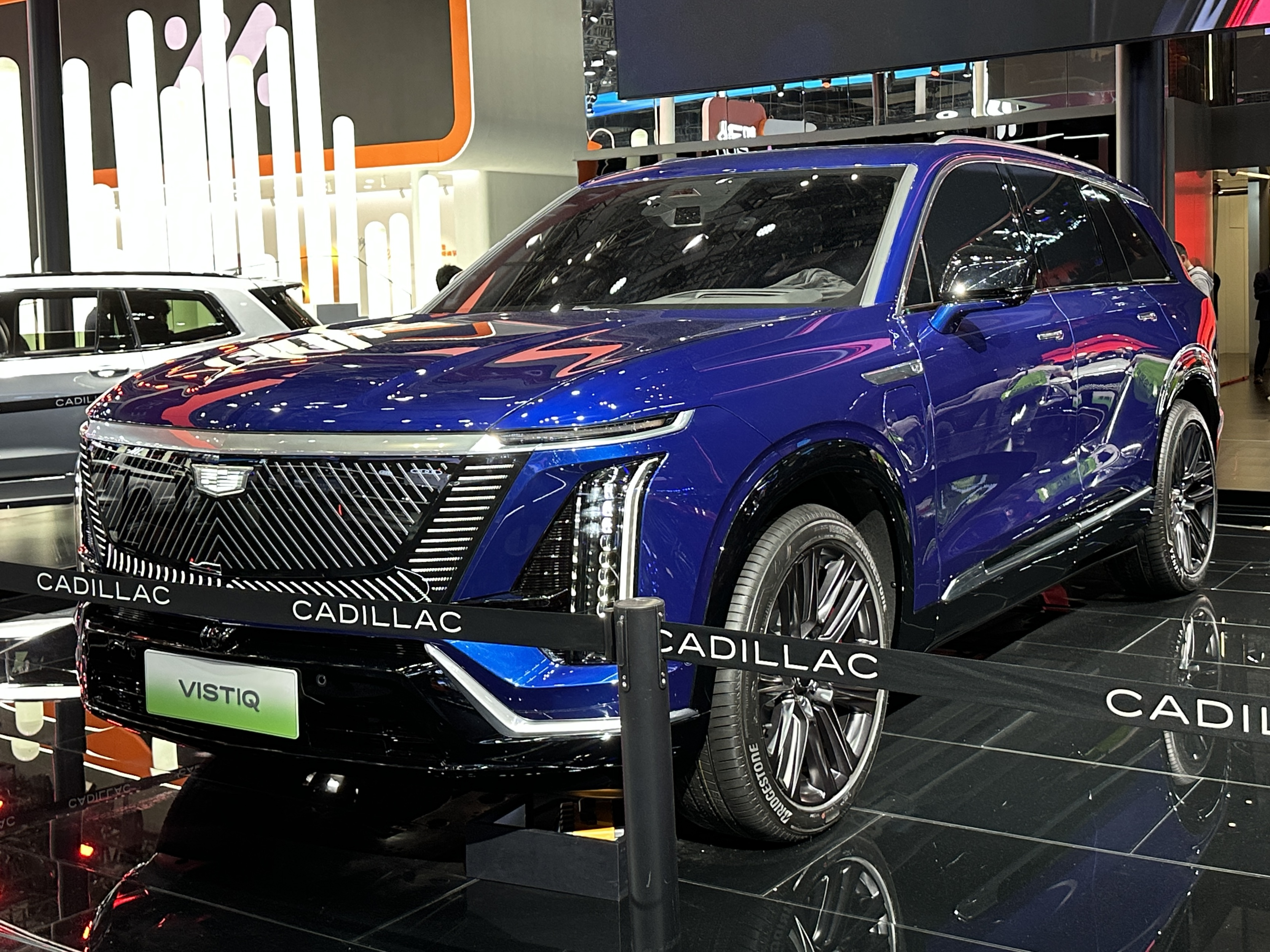
Cadillac Vistiq

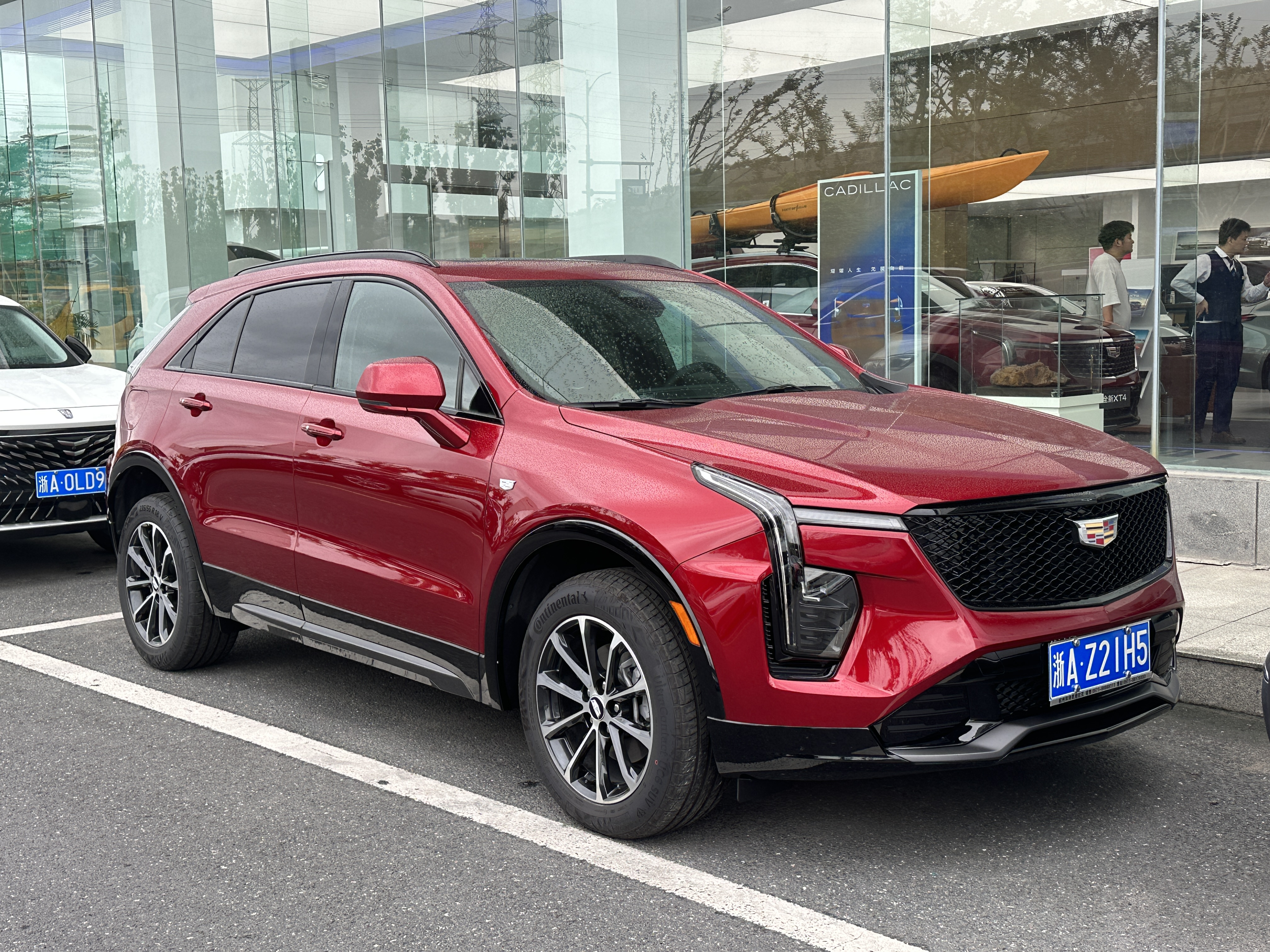
Cadillac XT4

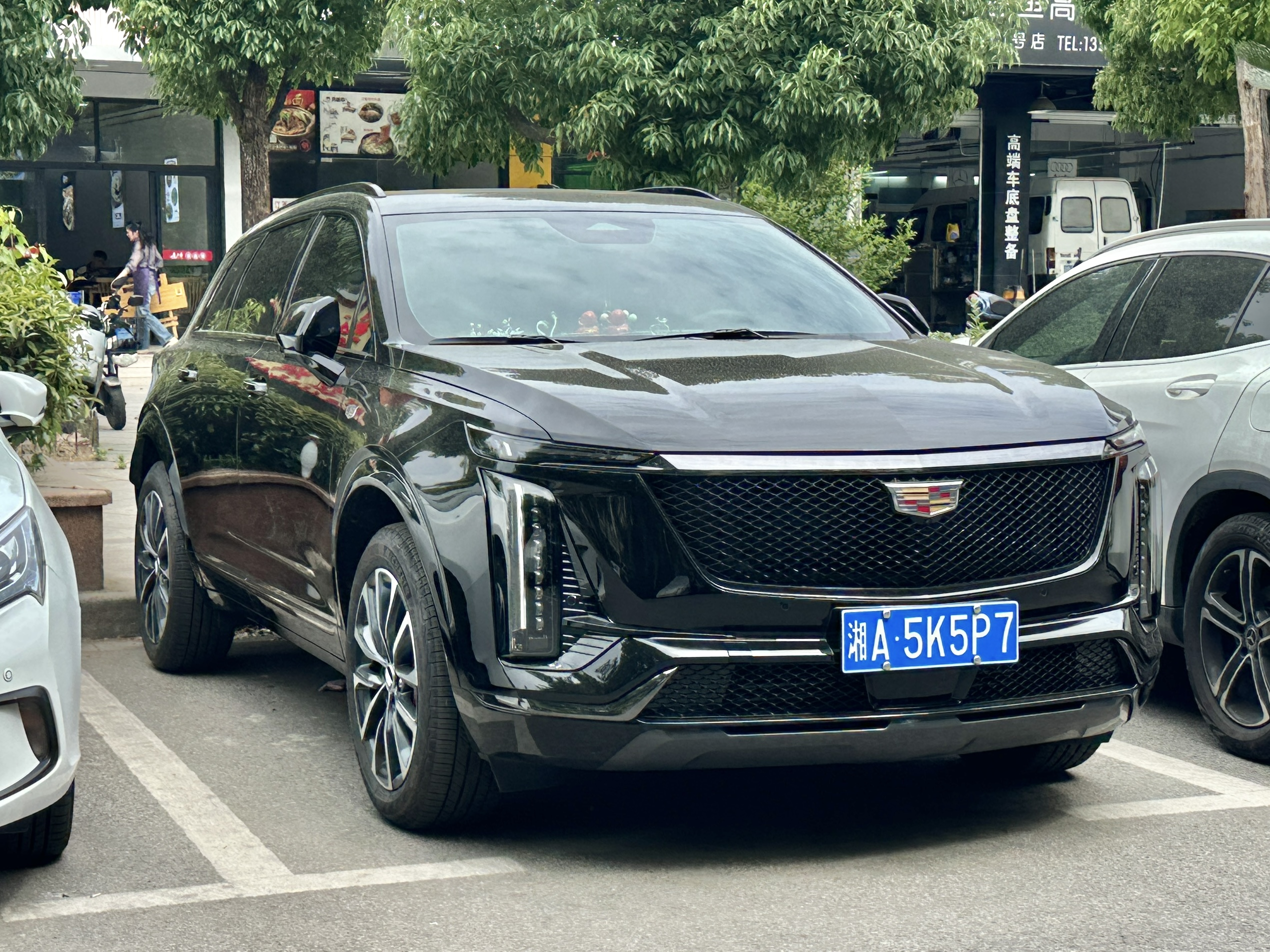
Cadillac XT5

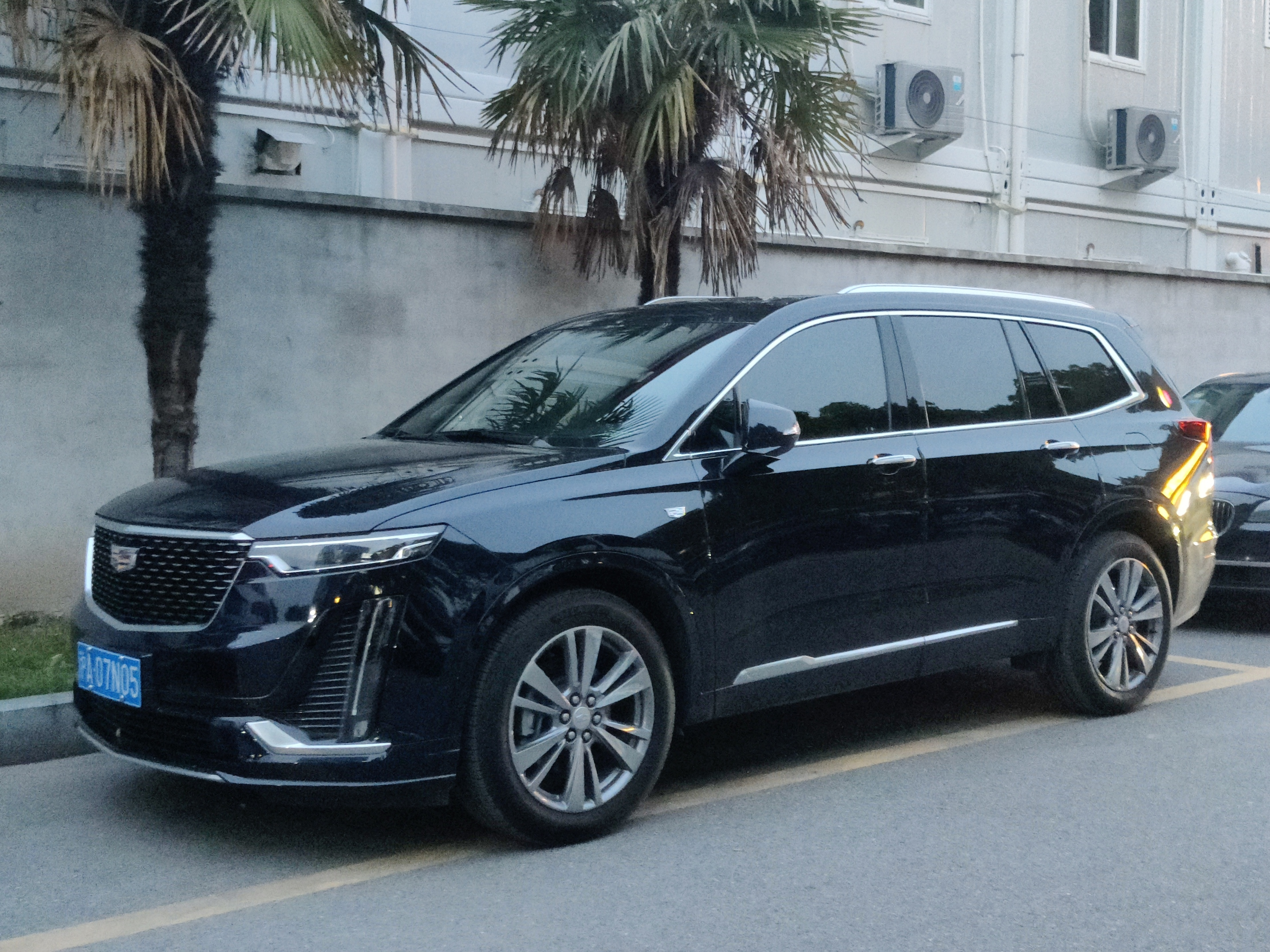
Cadillac XT6

=== Chevrolet ===
- Blazer
- Equinox
- Equinox Plus
- Monza
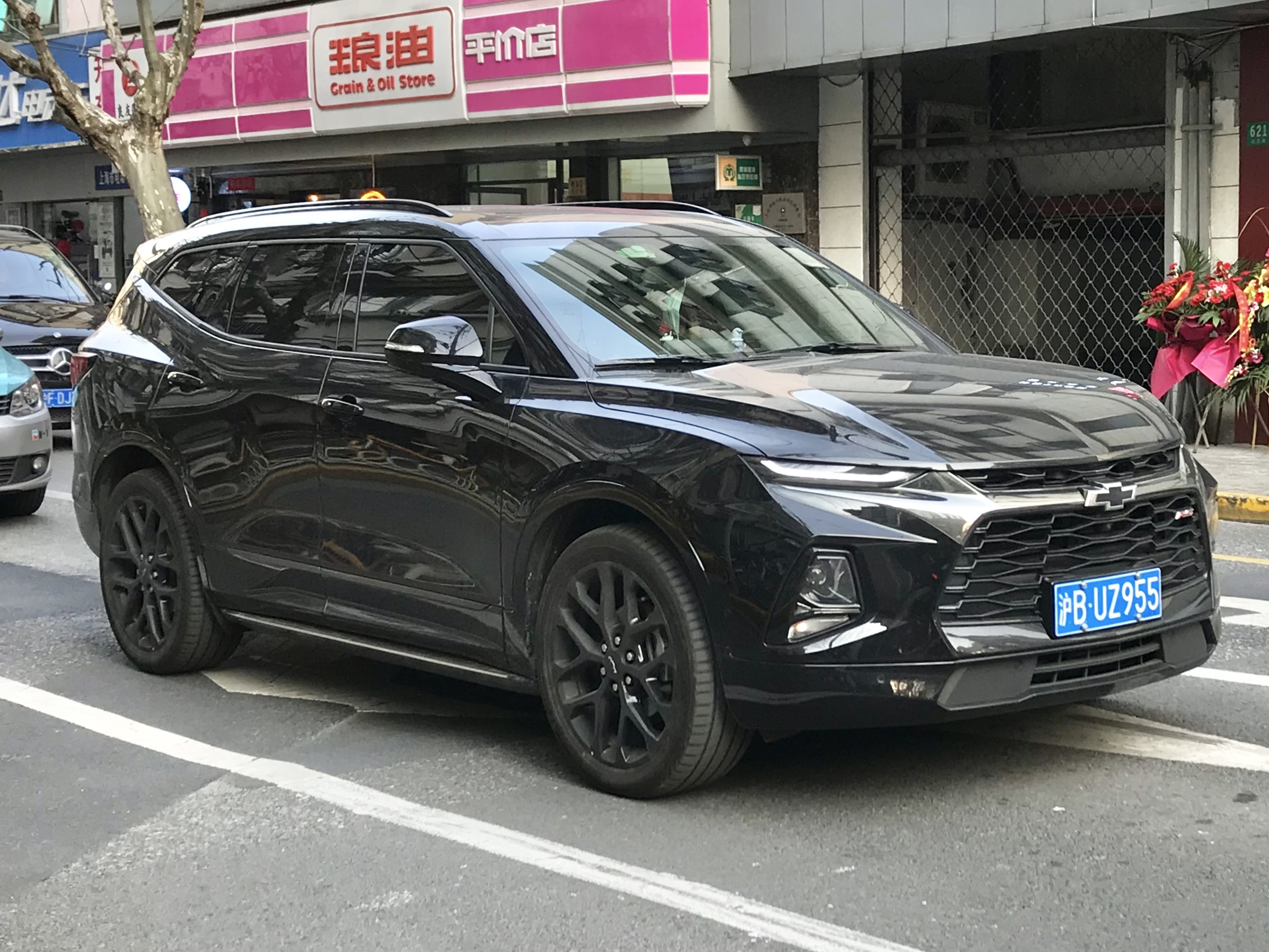
Chevrolet Blazer

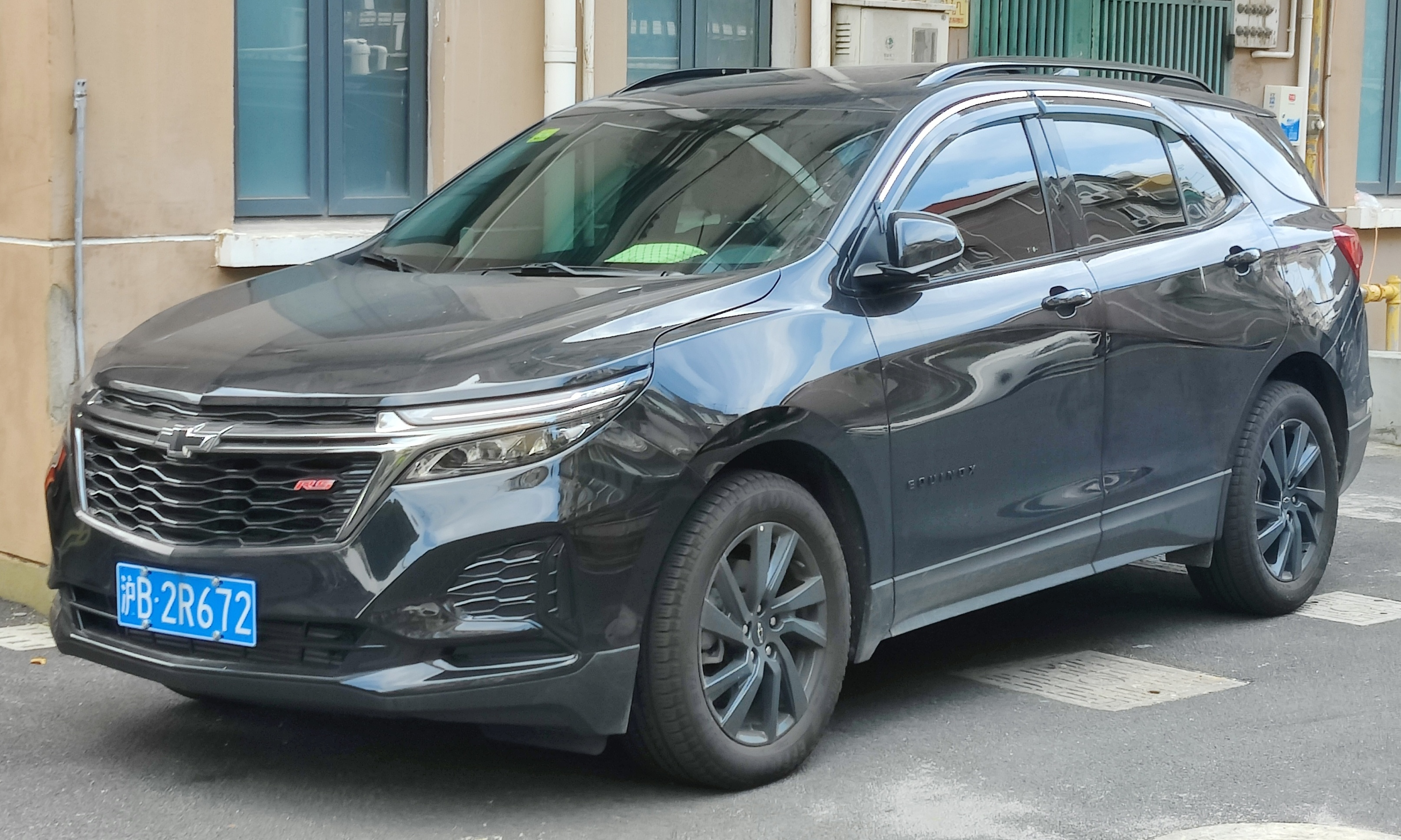
Chevrolet Equinox

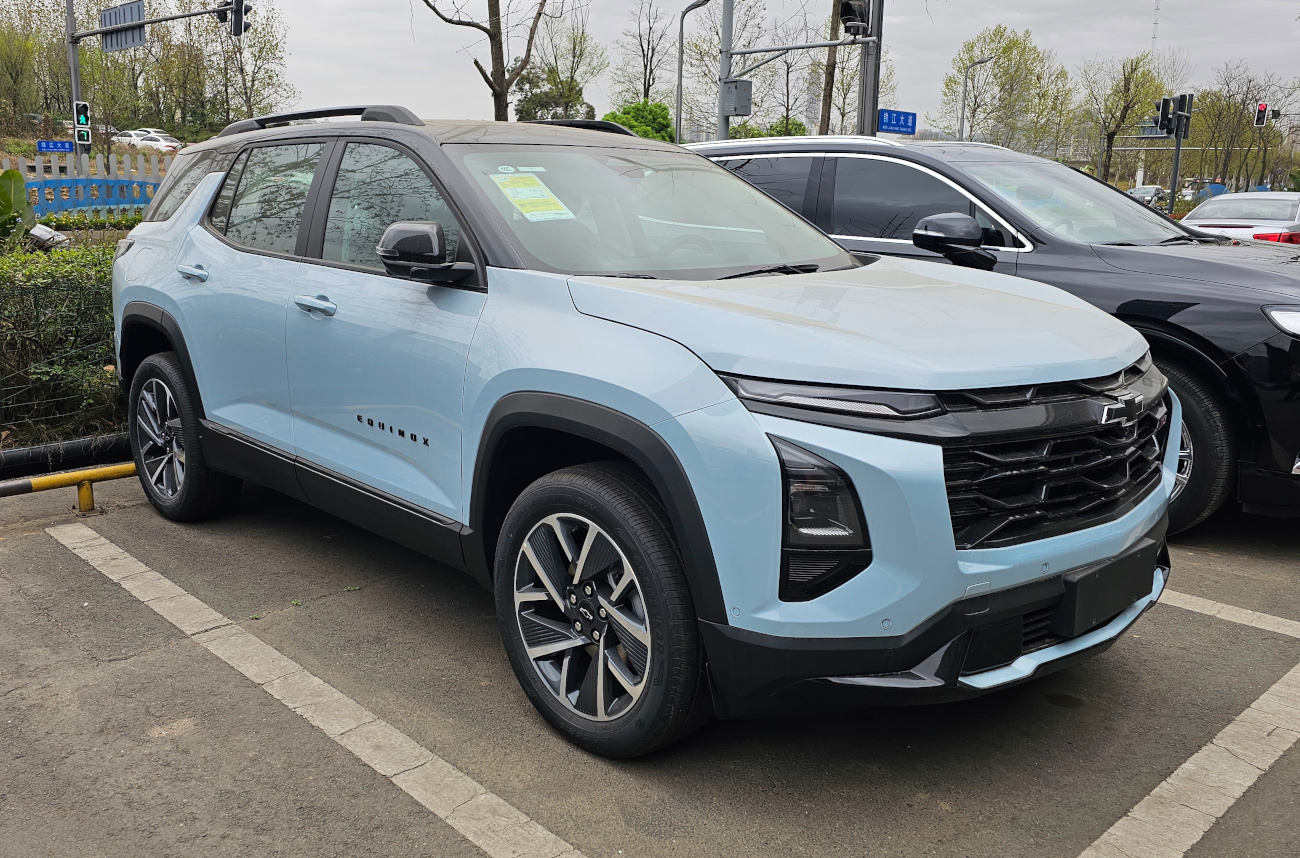
Chevrolet Equinox Plus

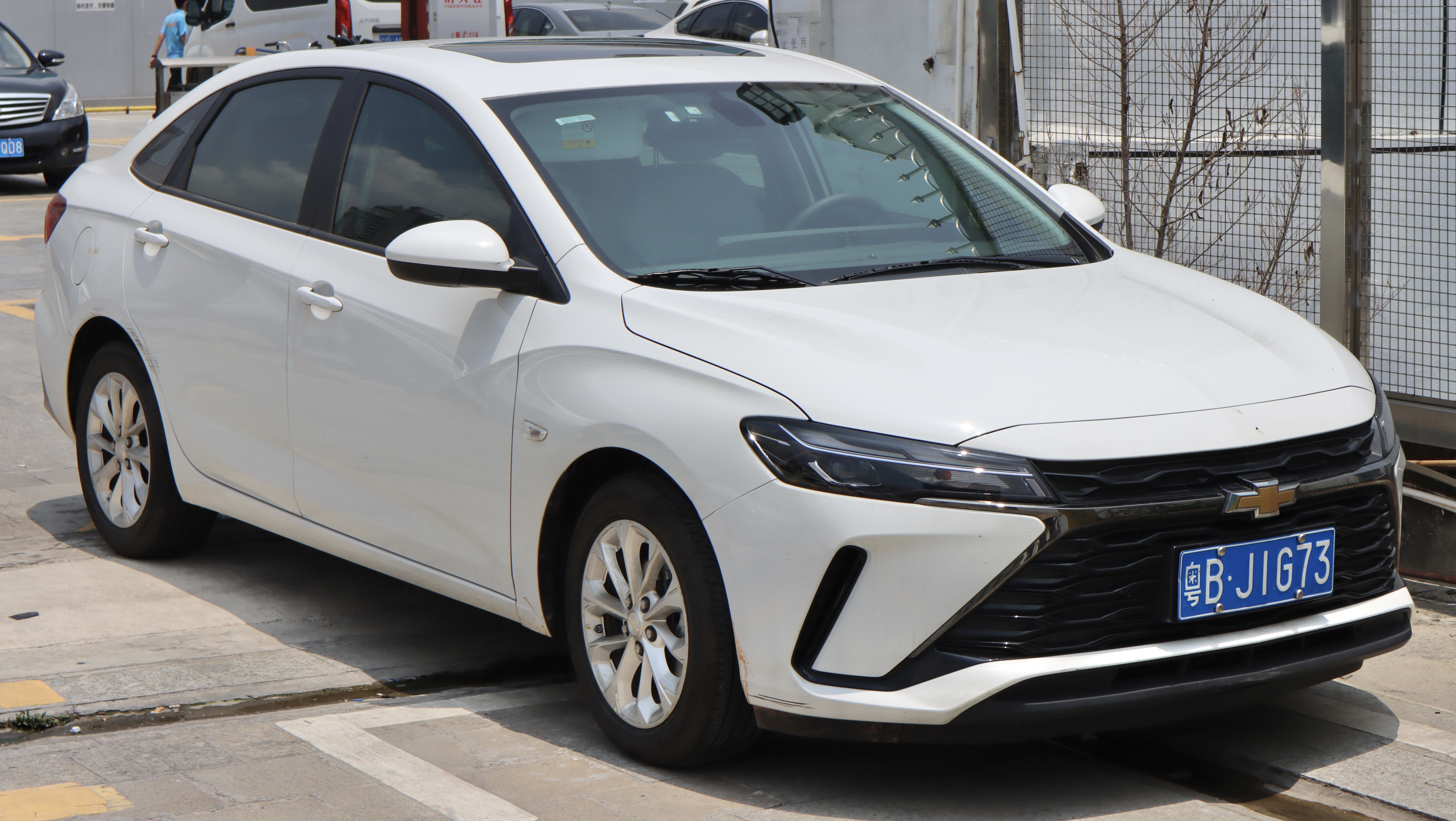
Chevrolet Monza

== Former models ==
=== Buick ===
- Electra E4
- Enclave
- Encore (Note: based on Opel Mokka)
- Encore GX (Note: rebadged to Encore Plus)
- Encore Plus
- Envista
- Envision
- Excelle
- Excelle XT (Note: based on the Opel Astra J)
- Excelle GT
- Excelle GX
- GL6
- New Century (Note: rename of the Buick Century to avoid confusion with the Toyota Century)
- Park Avenue (Note: based on the Holden Statesman/Caprice)
- Roadmaster (Note: imported)
- Royaum (Note: rebadge of the Holden Caprice WL series)
- Velite 5 (Note: rebadge of the Chevrolet Volt)
- Velite 7
- Verano Hatch/GS (Note: based on Opel Astra K)
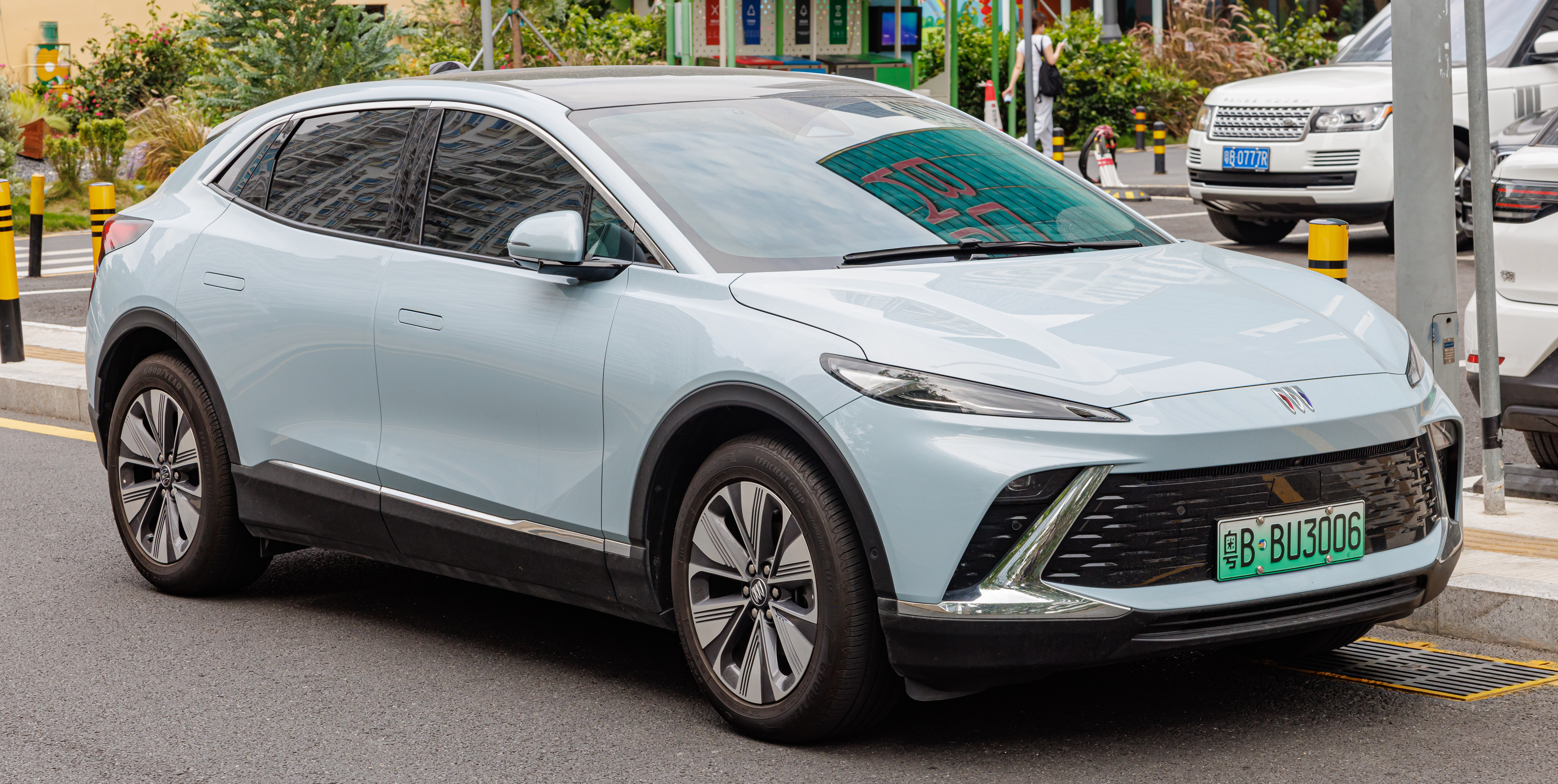
Buick Electra E4

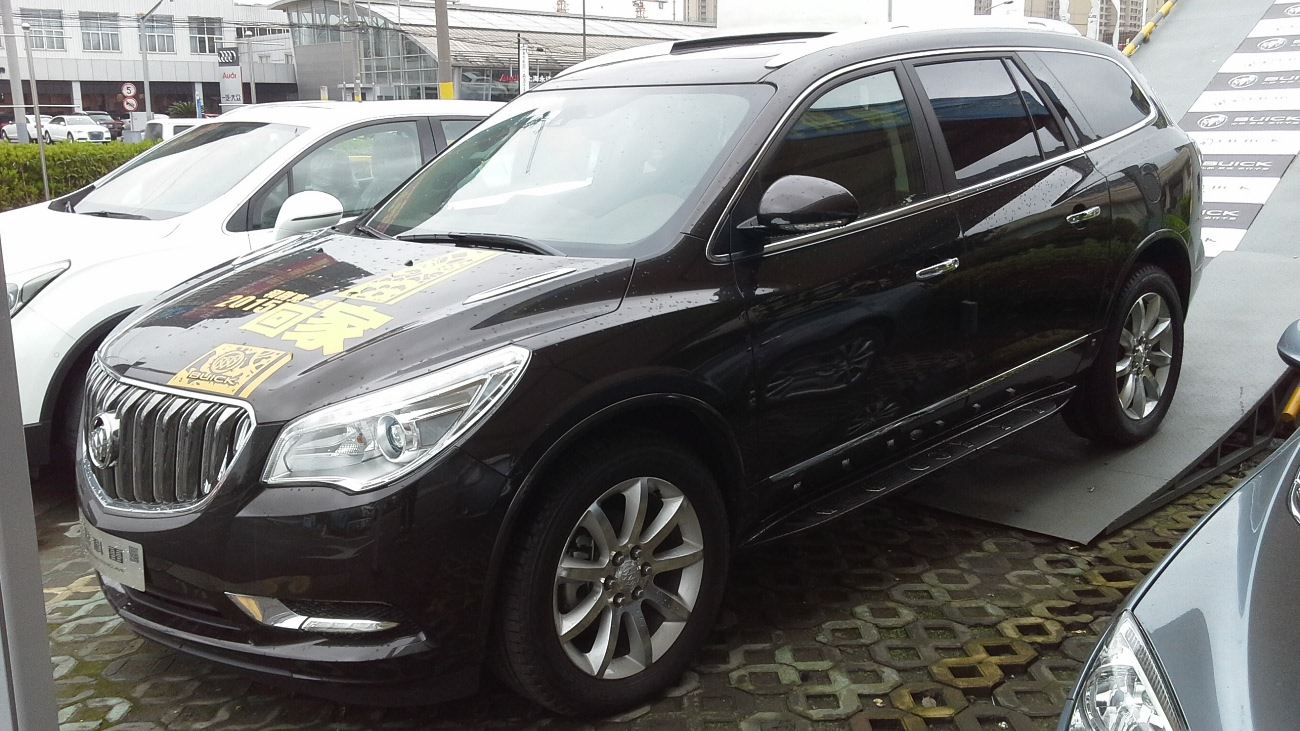
Buick Enclave (facelift)

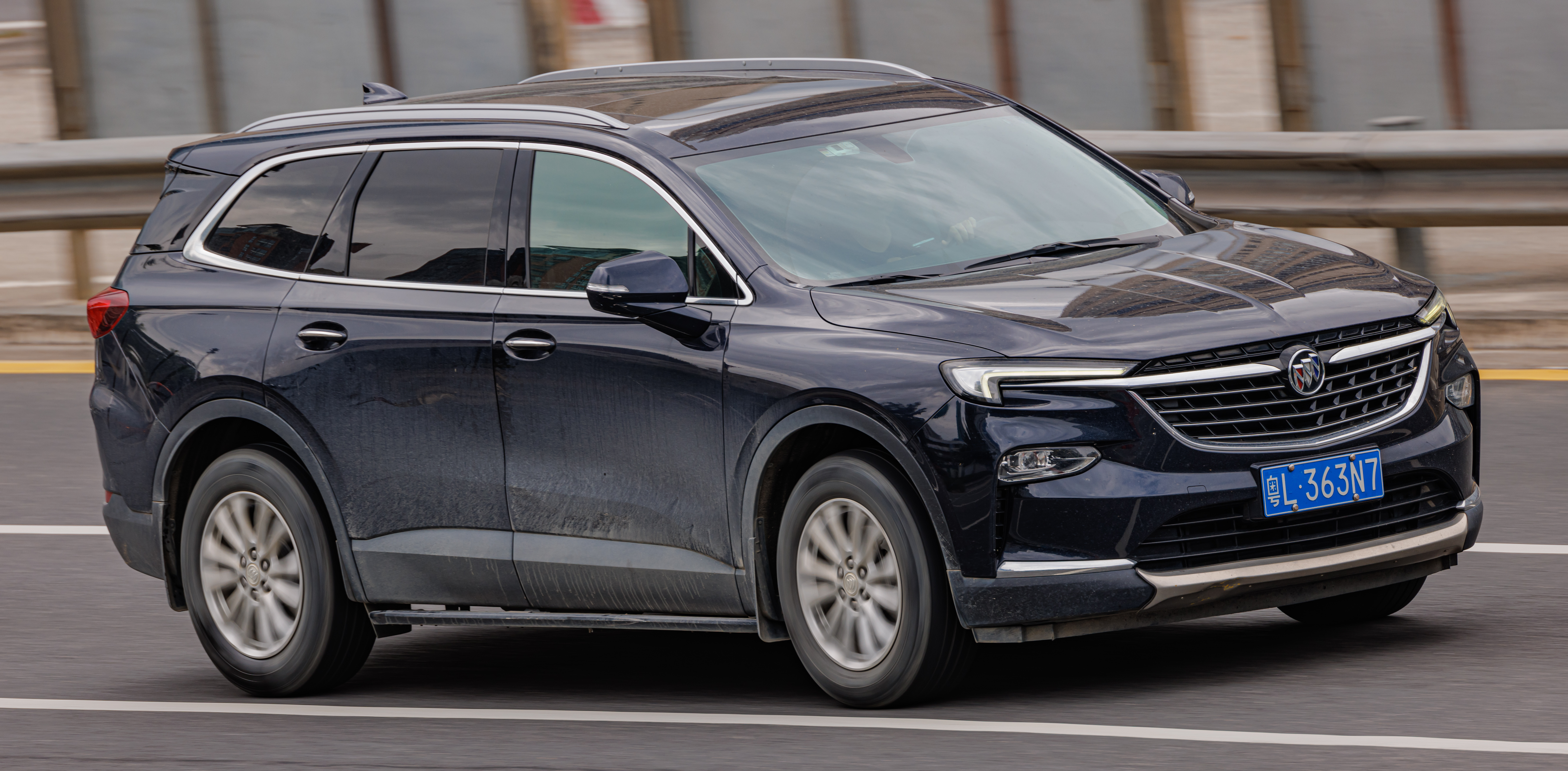
Buick Enclave II

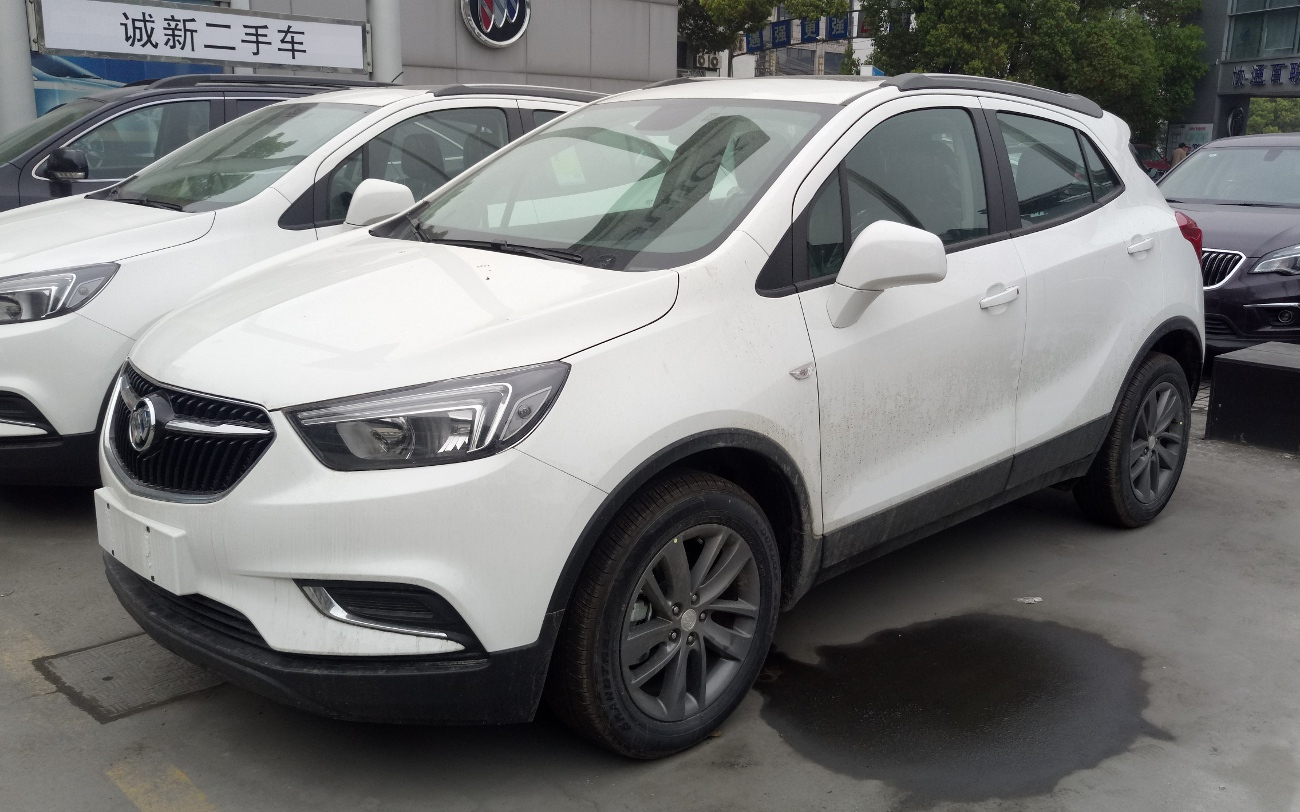
Buick Encore I

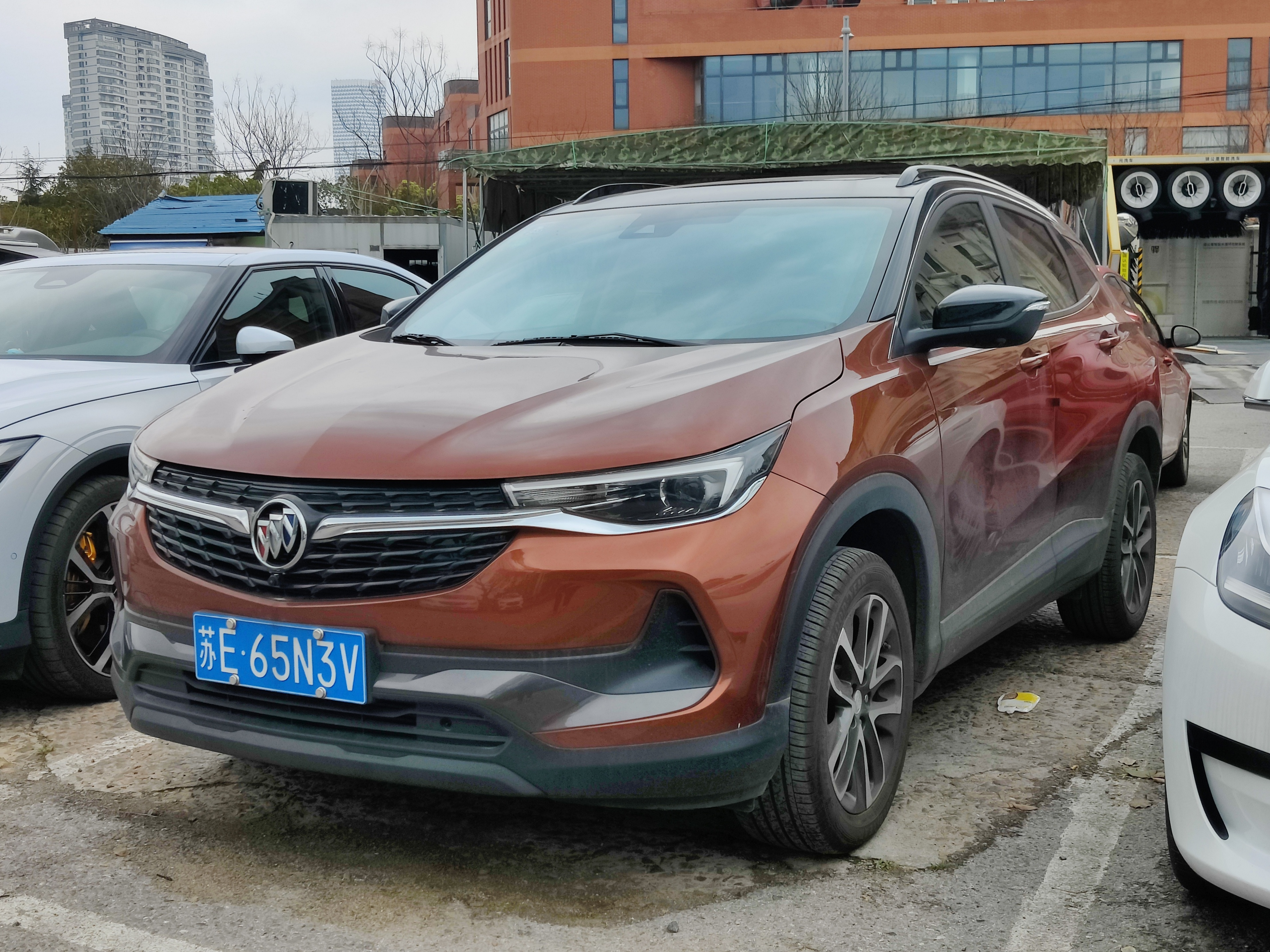
Buick Encore II

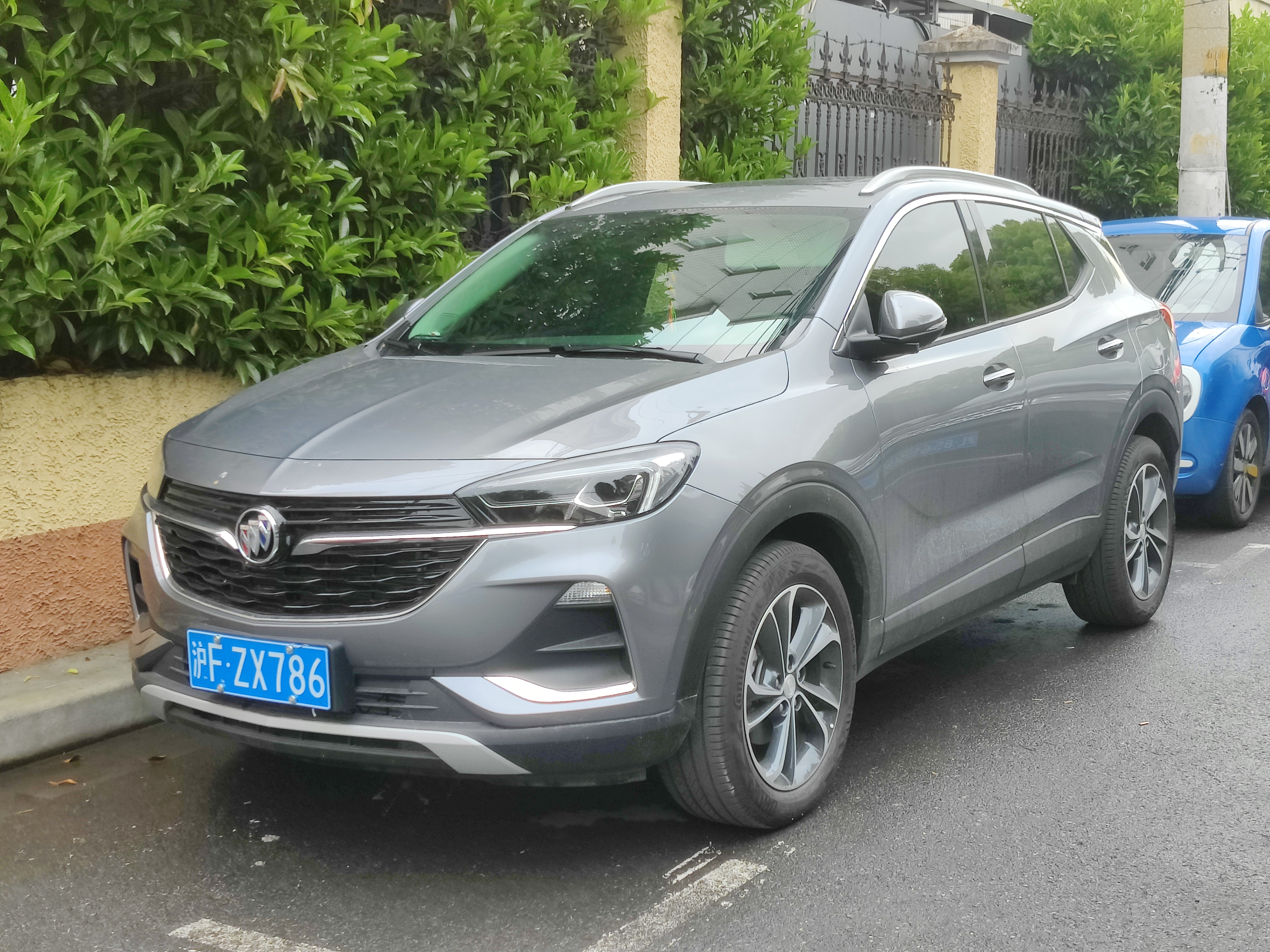
Buick Encore GX

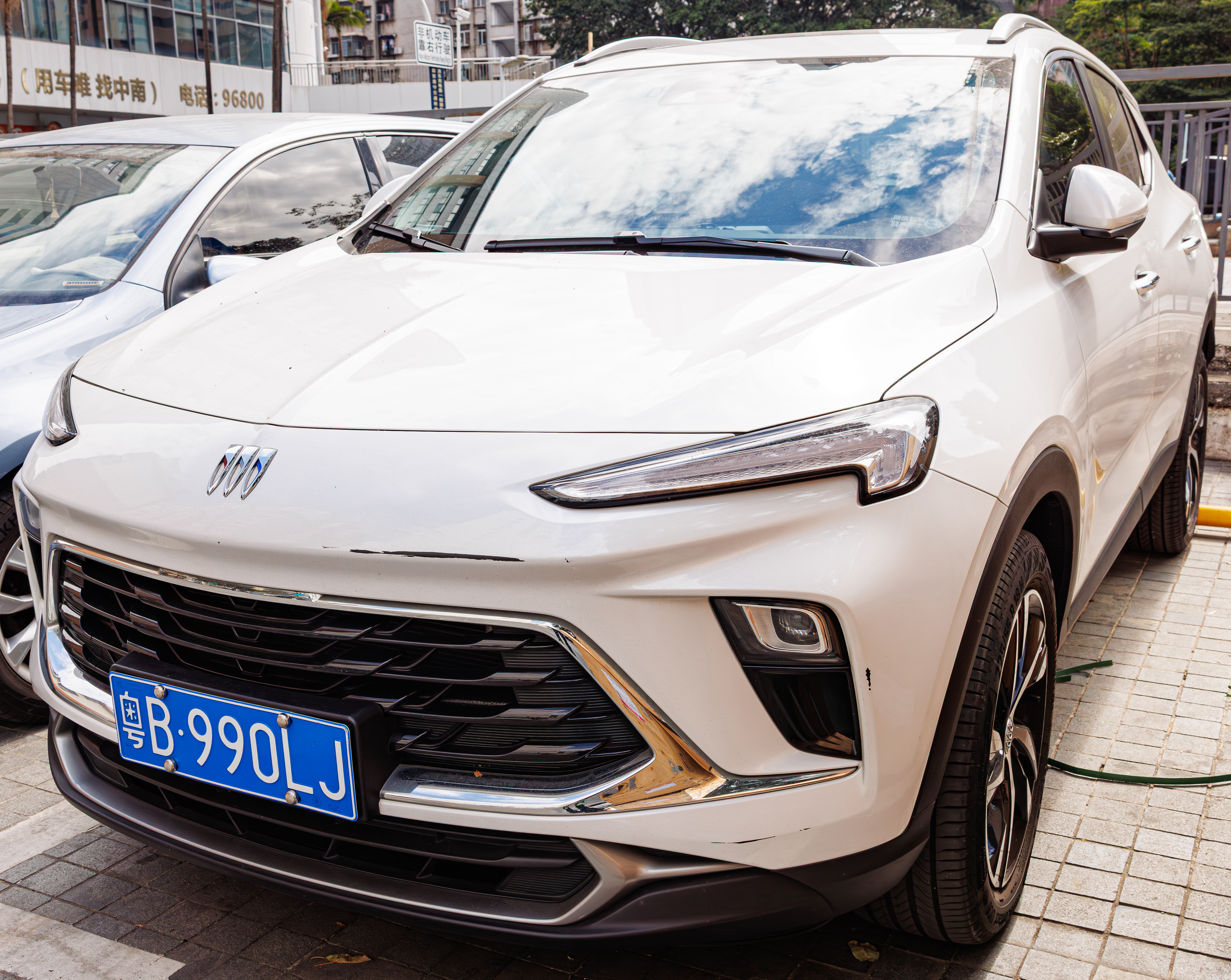
Buick Encore Plus

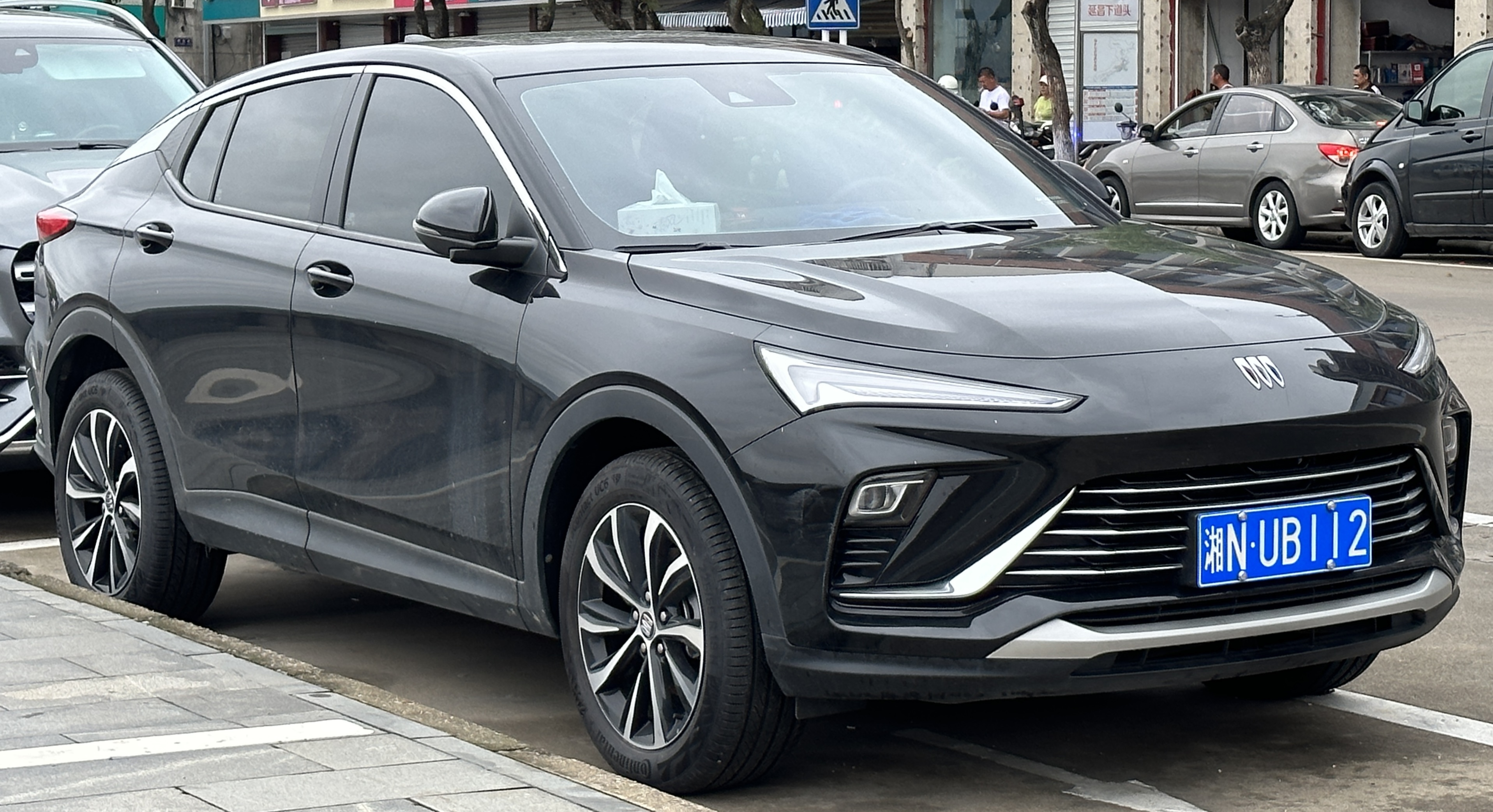
Buick Envista

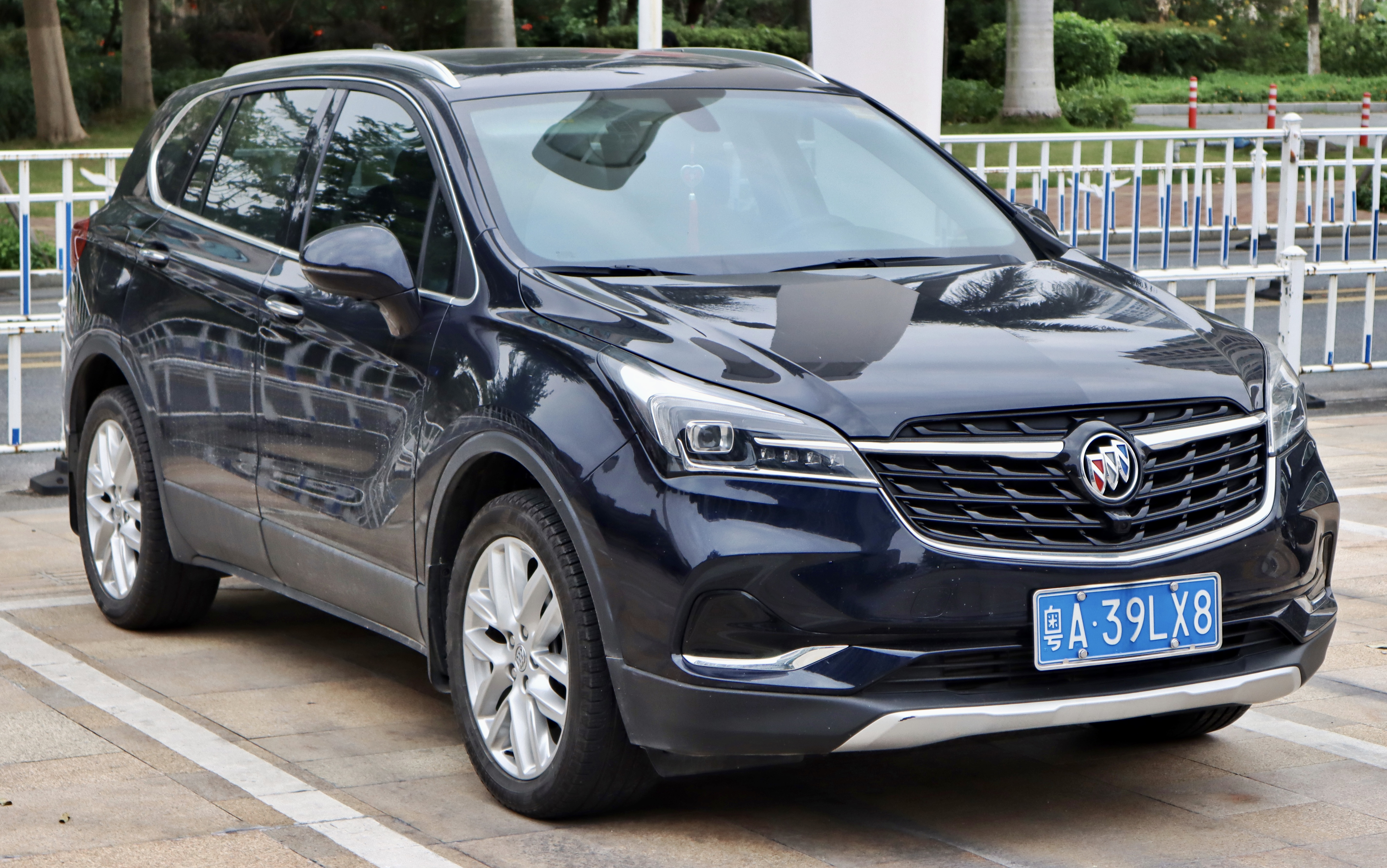
Buick Envision

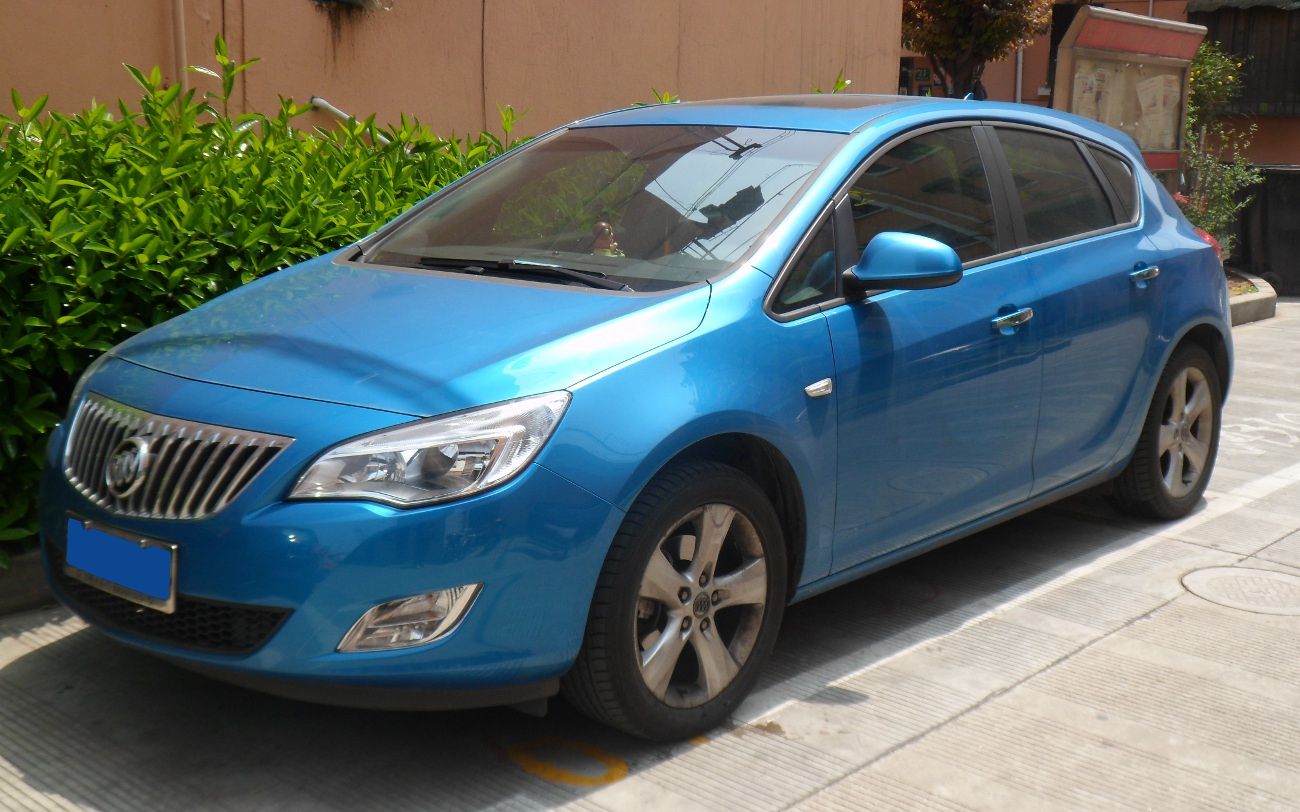
Buick Excelle XT

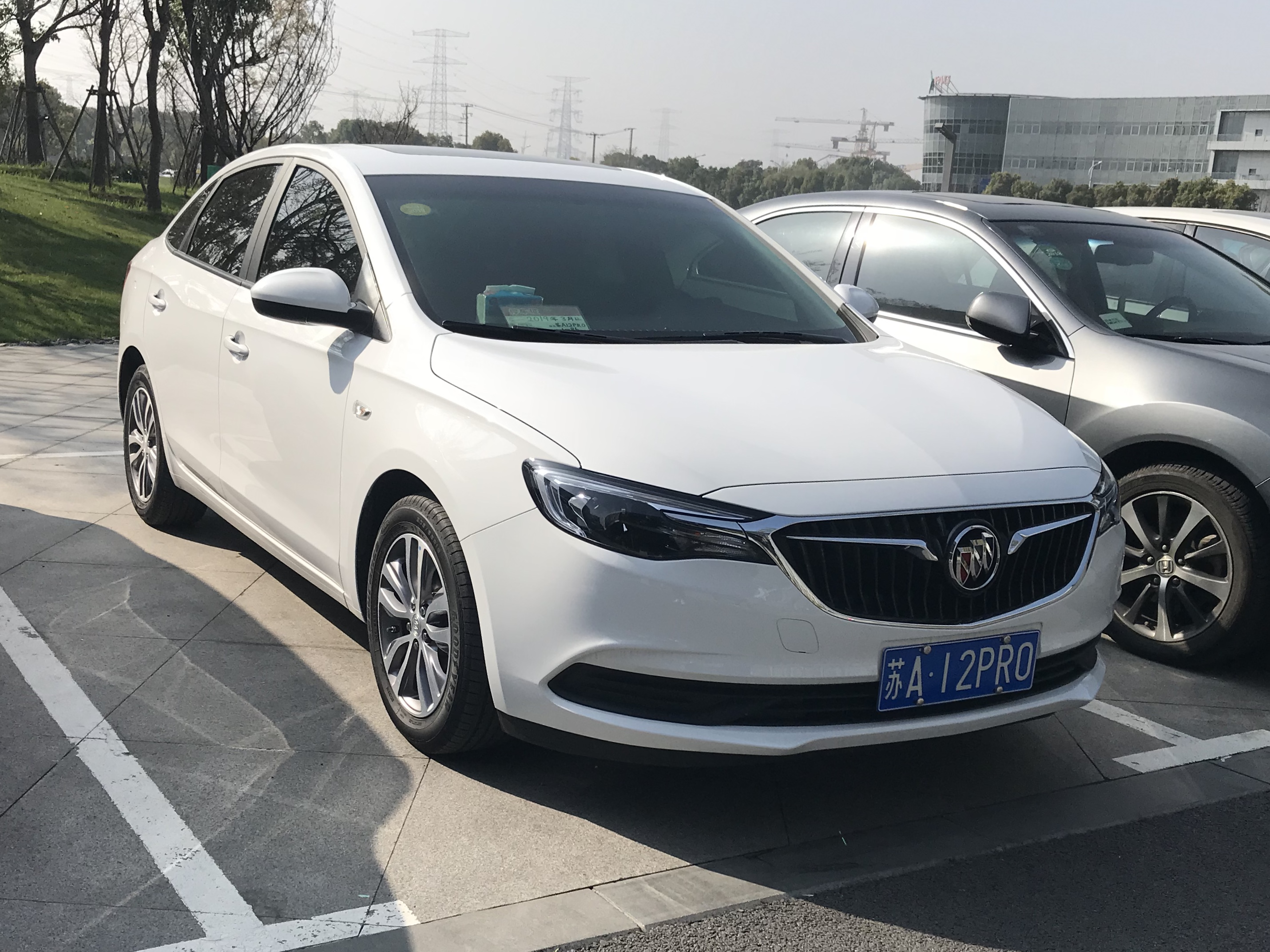
Buick Excelle GT II

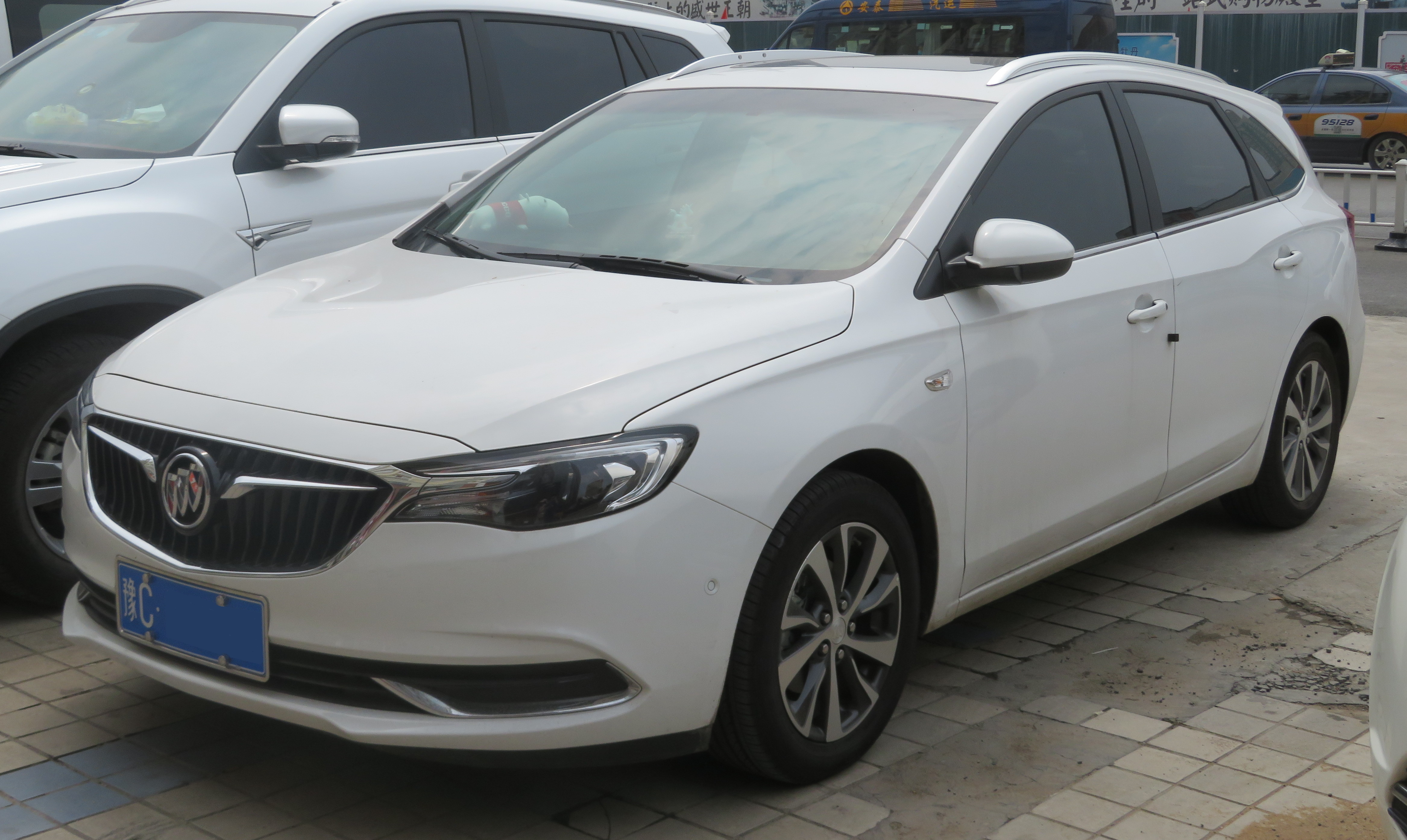
Buick Excelle GX

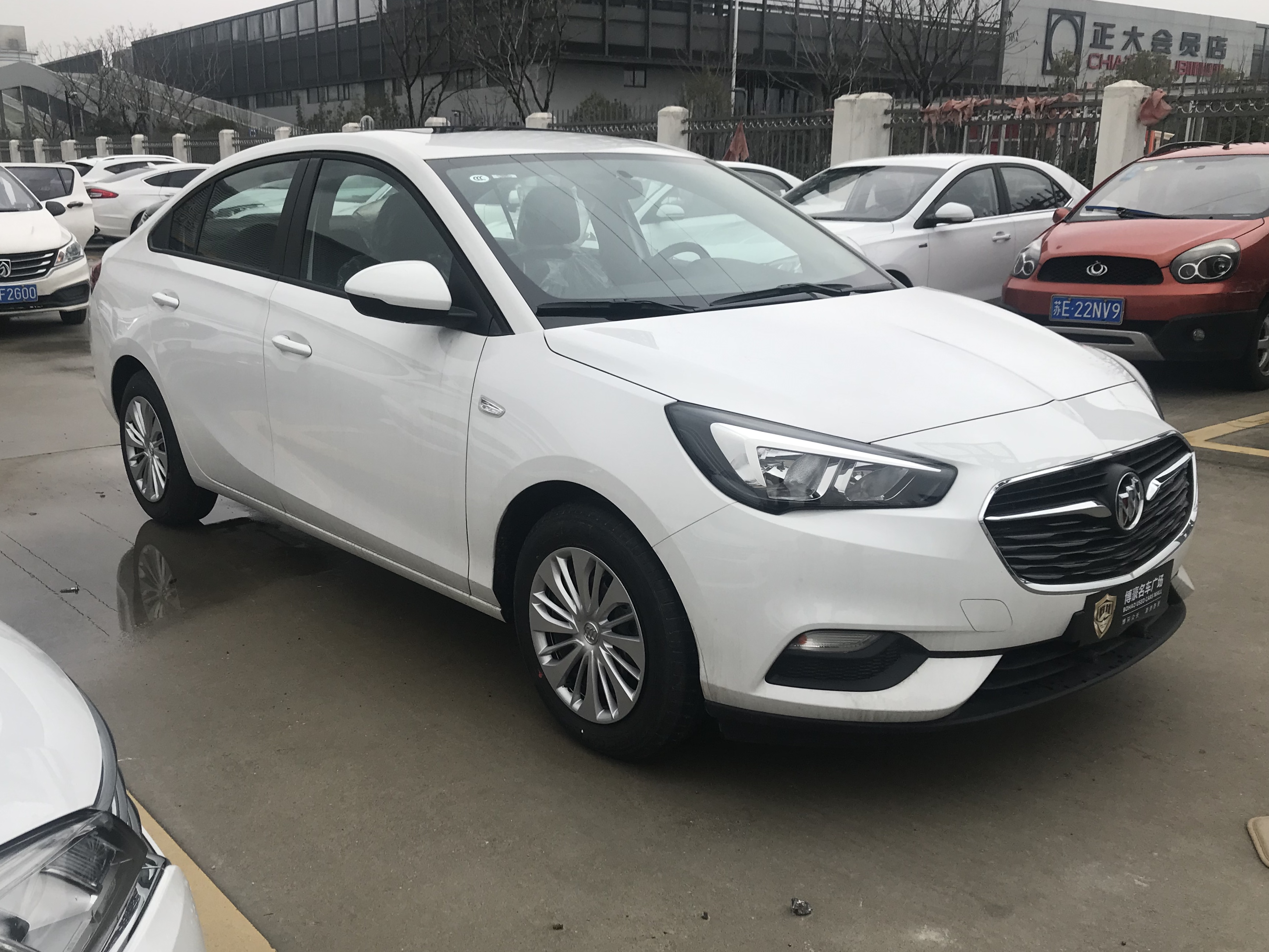
Buick Excelle

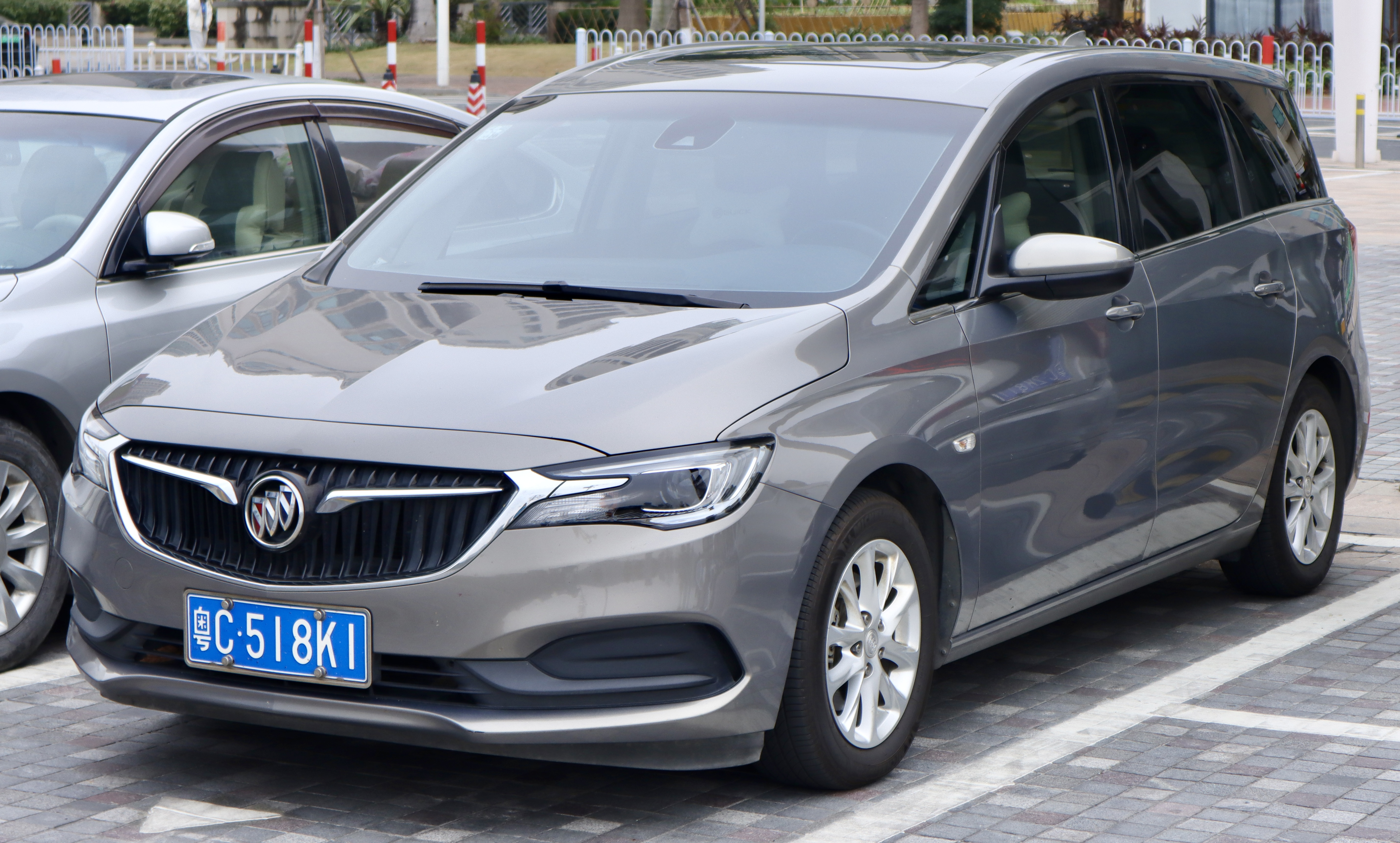
Buick GL6

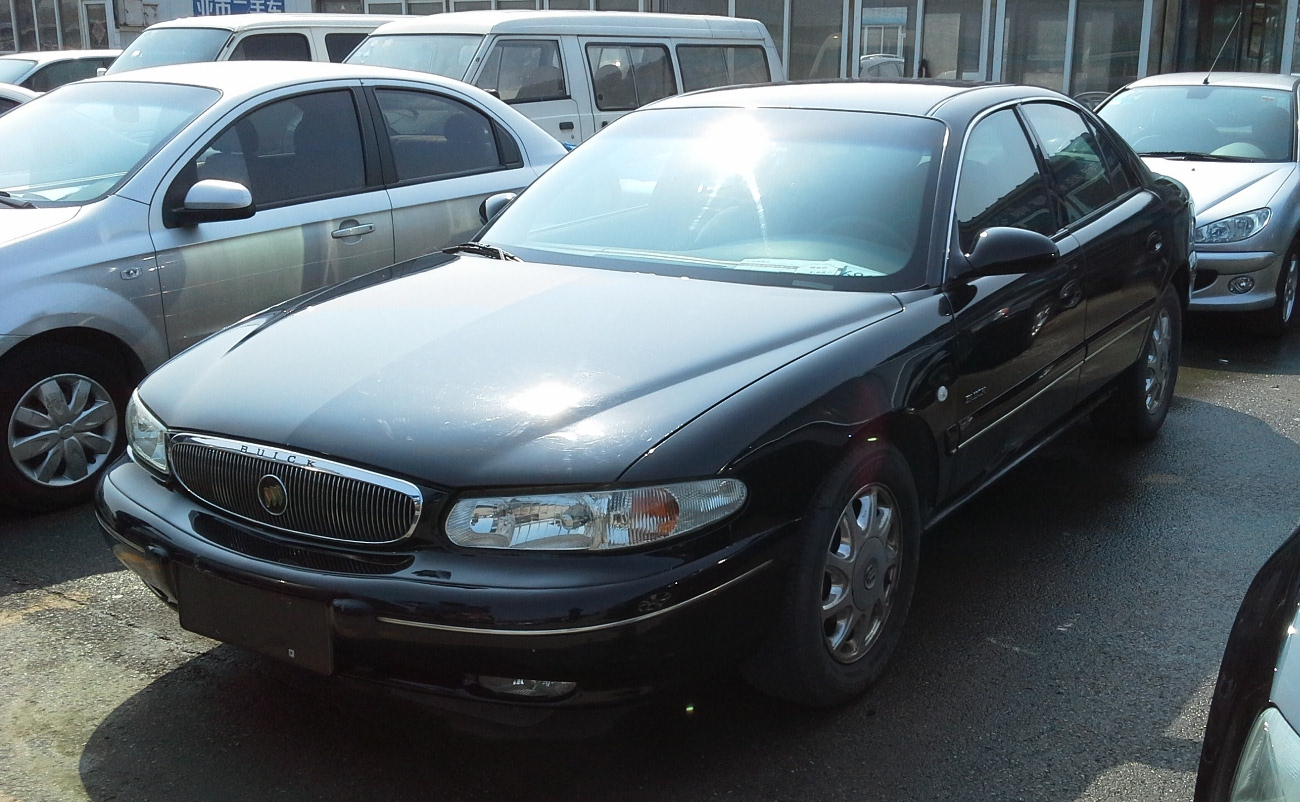
Buick New Century GL

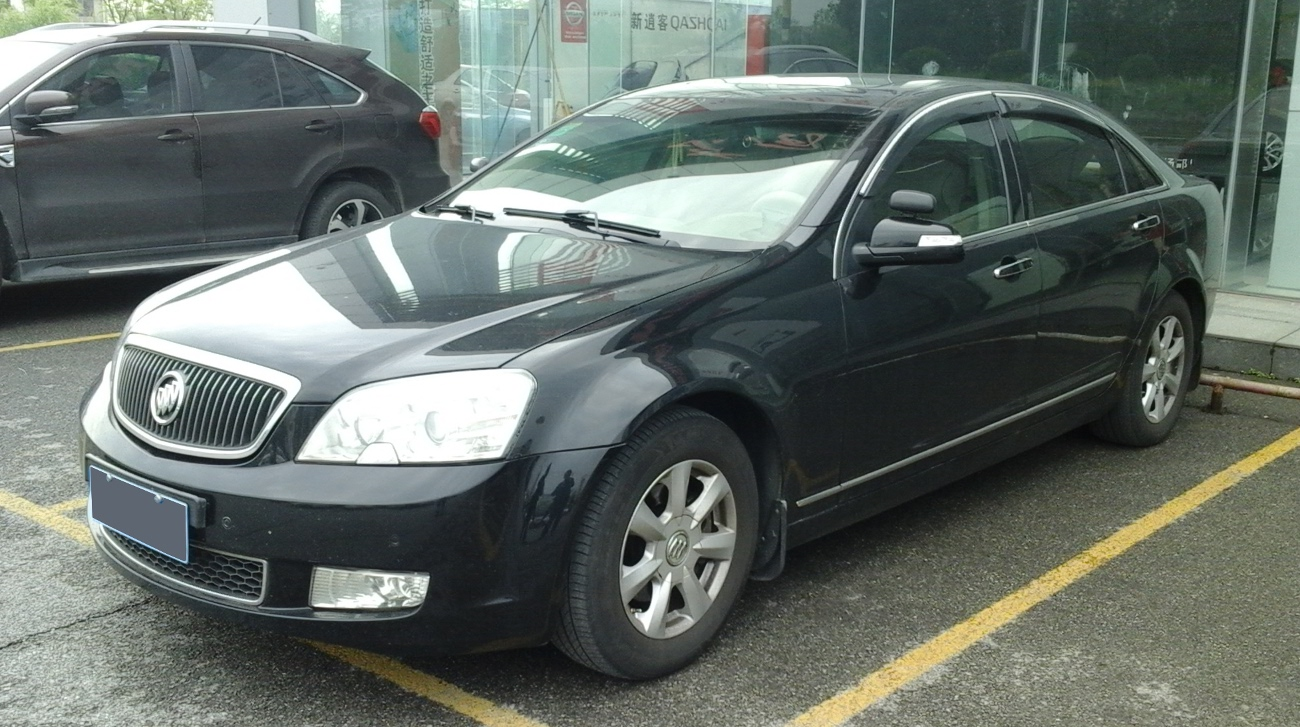
Buick Park Avenue

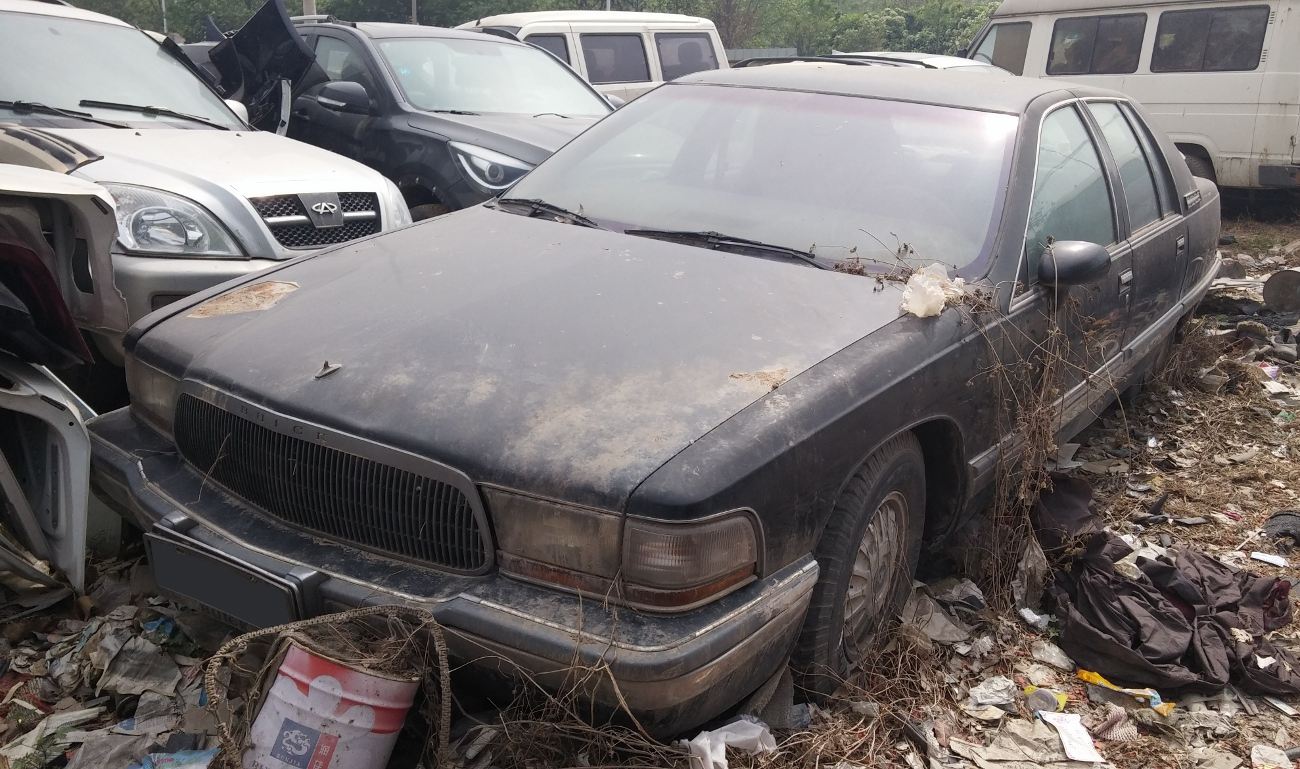
Buick Roadmaster

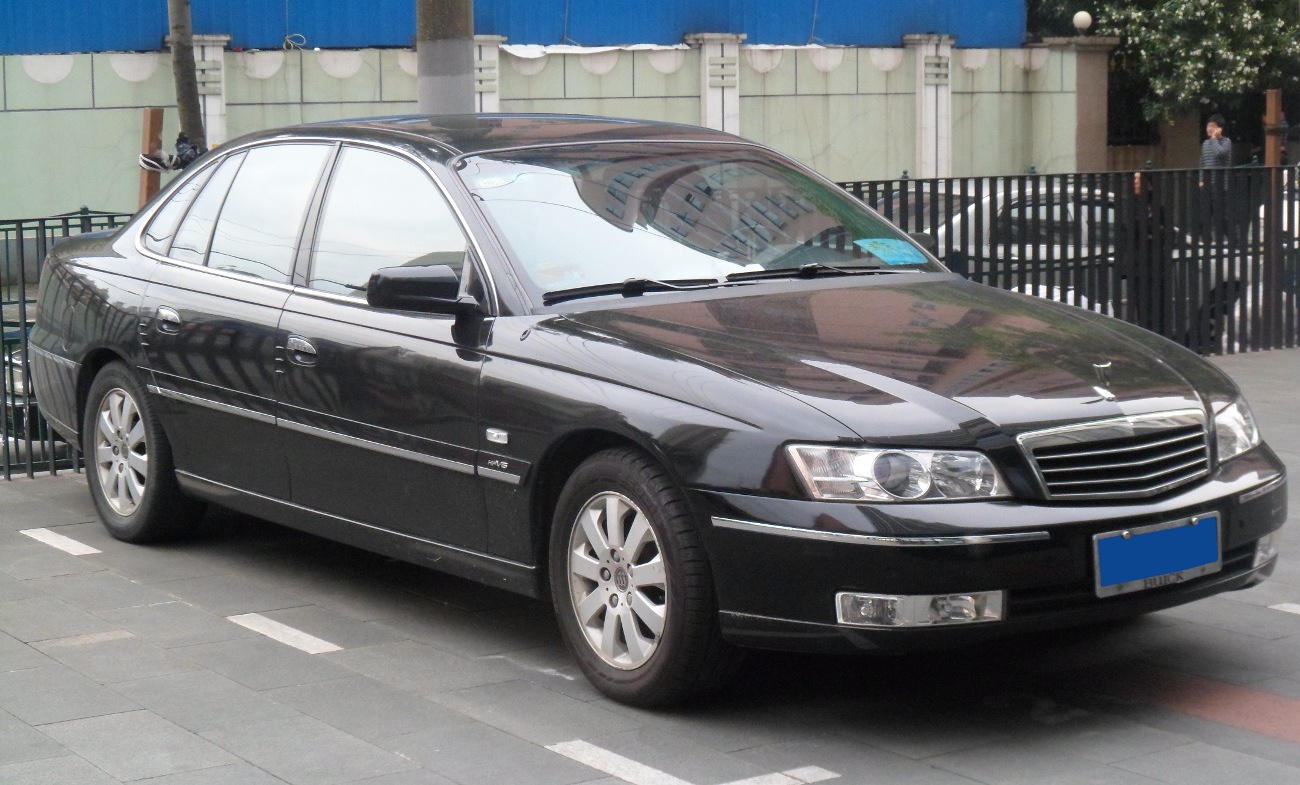
Buick Royaum

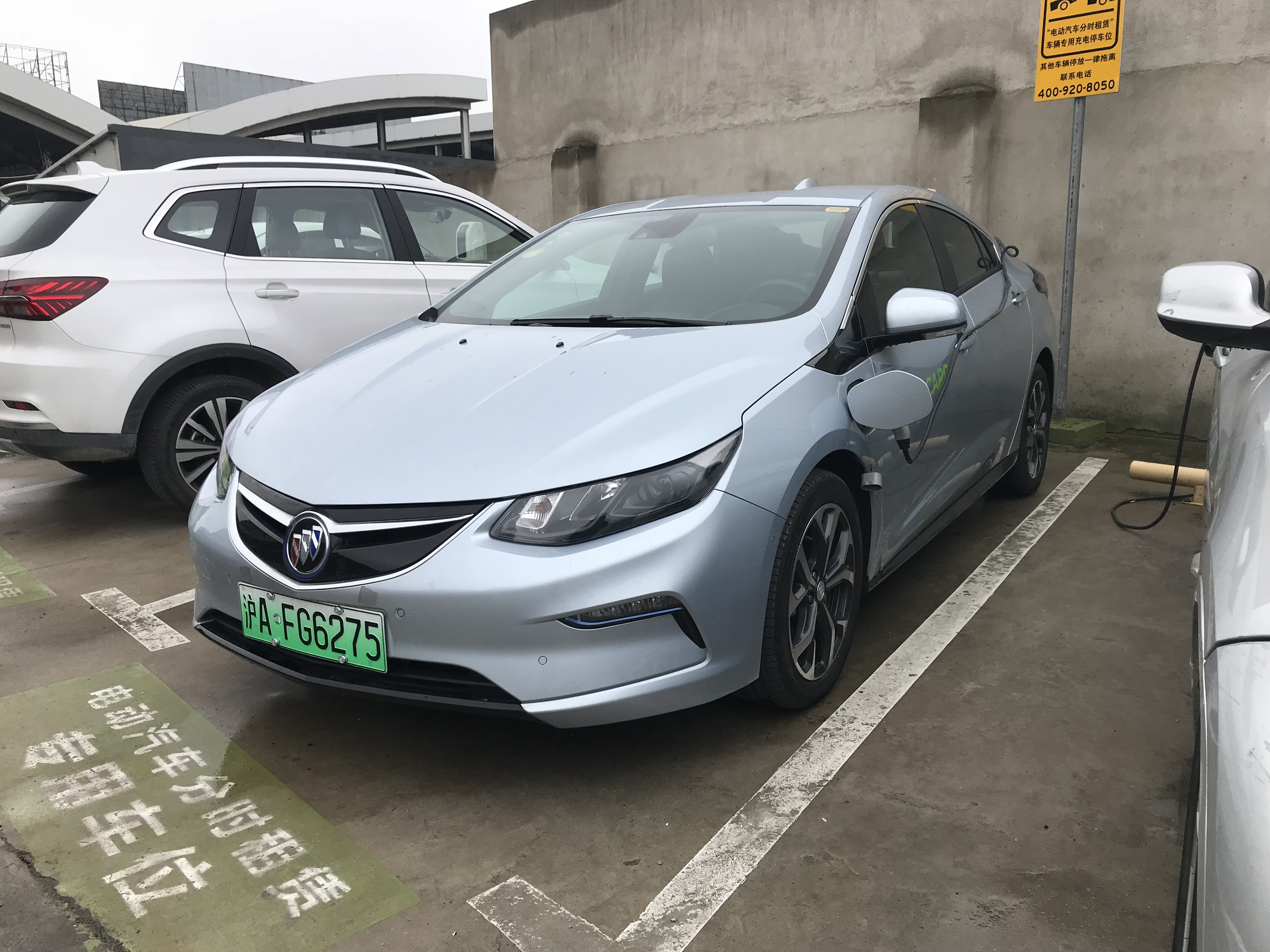
Buick Velite 5

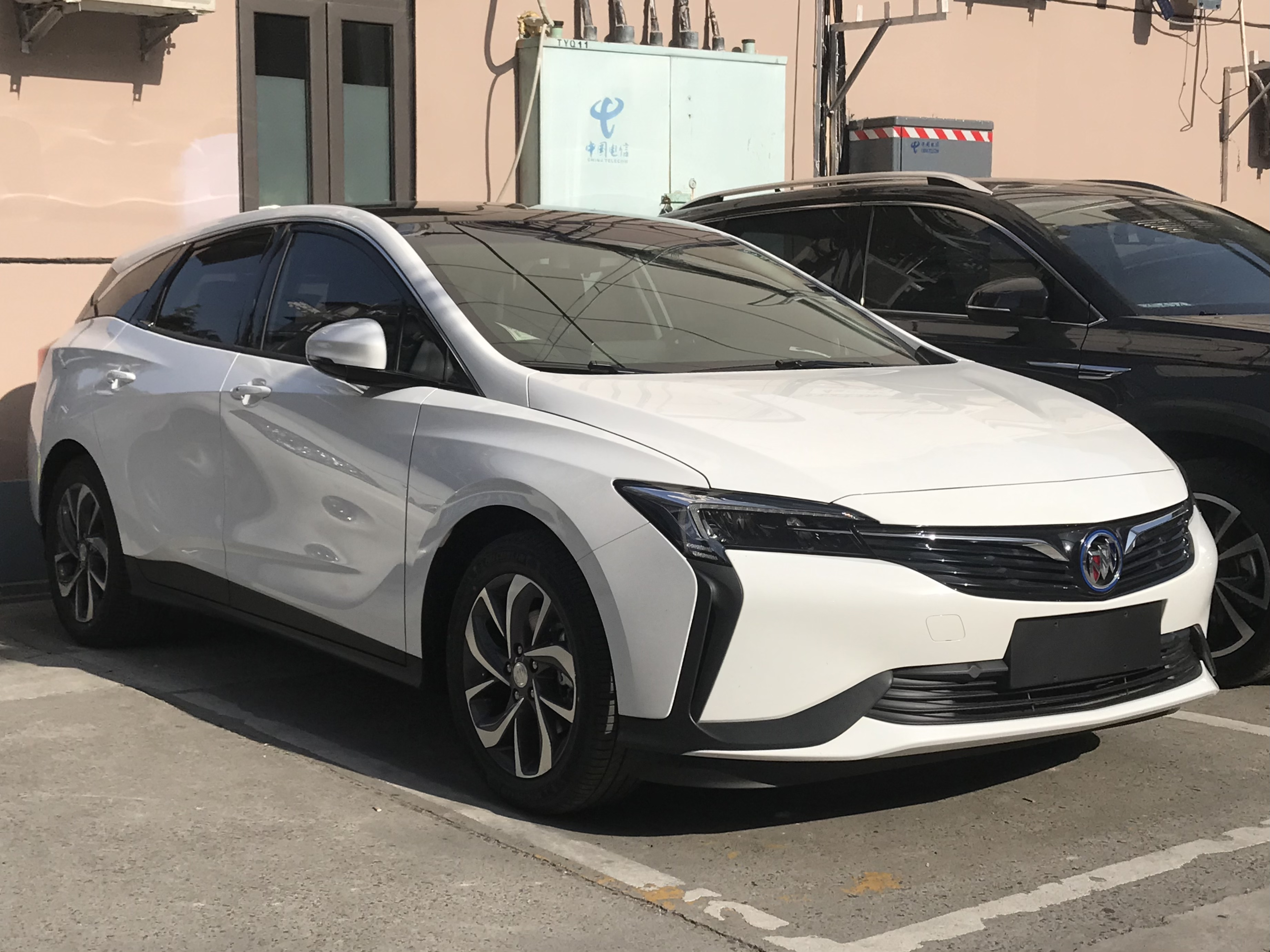
Buick Velite 6 PHEV

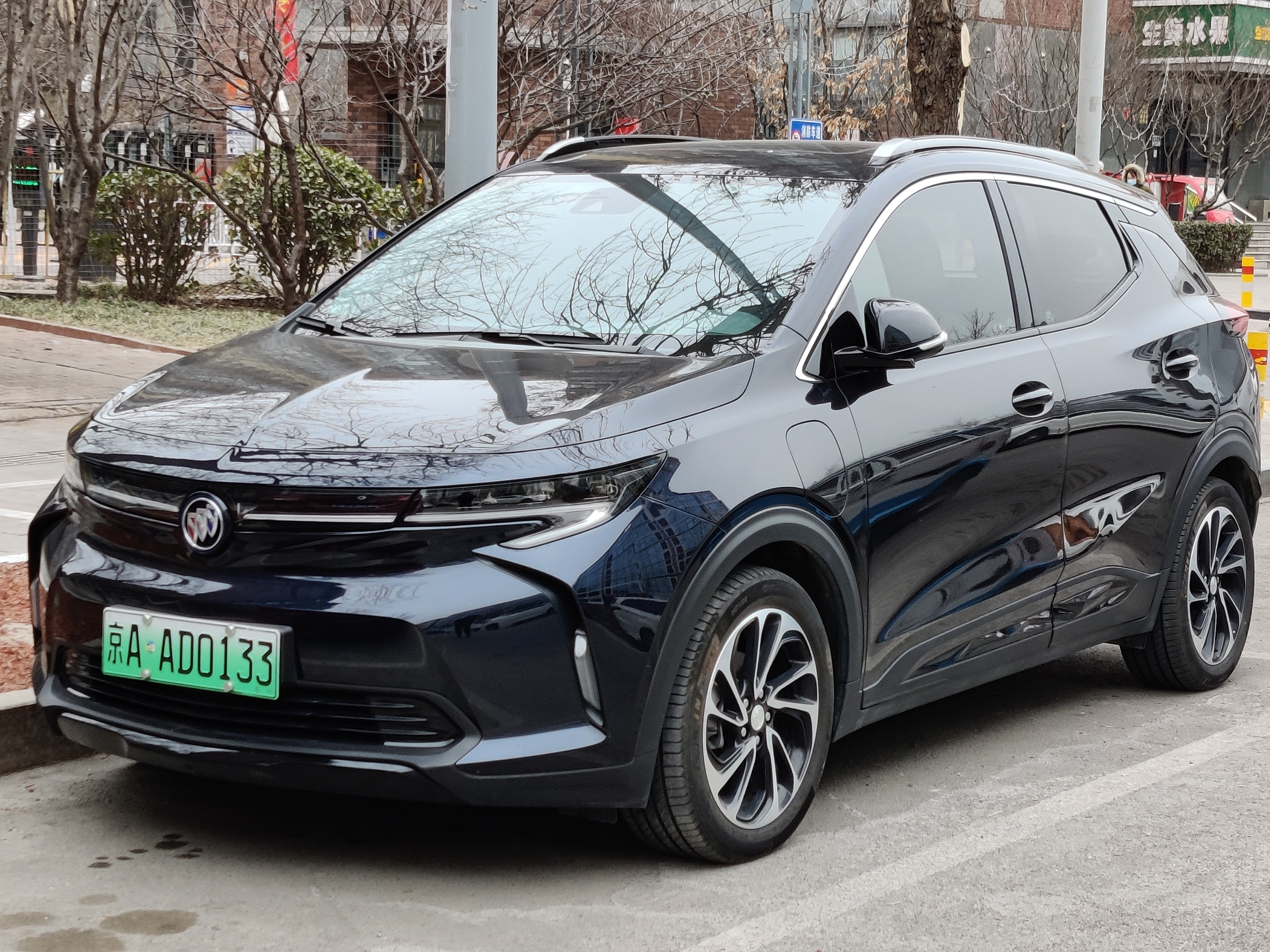
Buick Velite 7

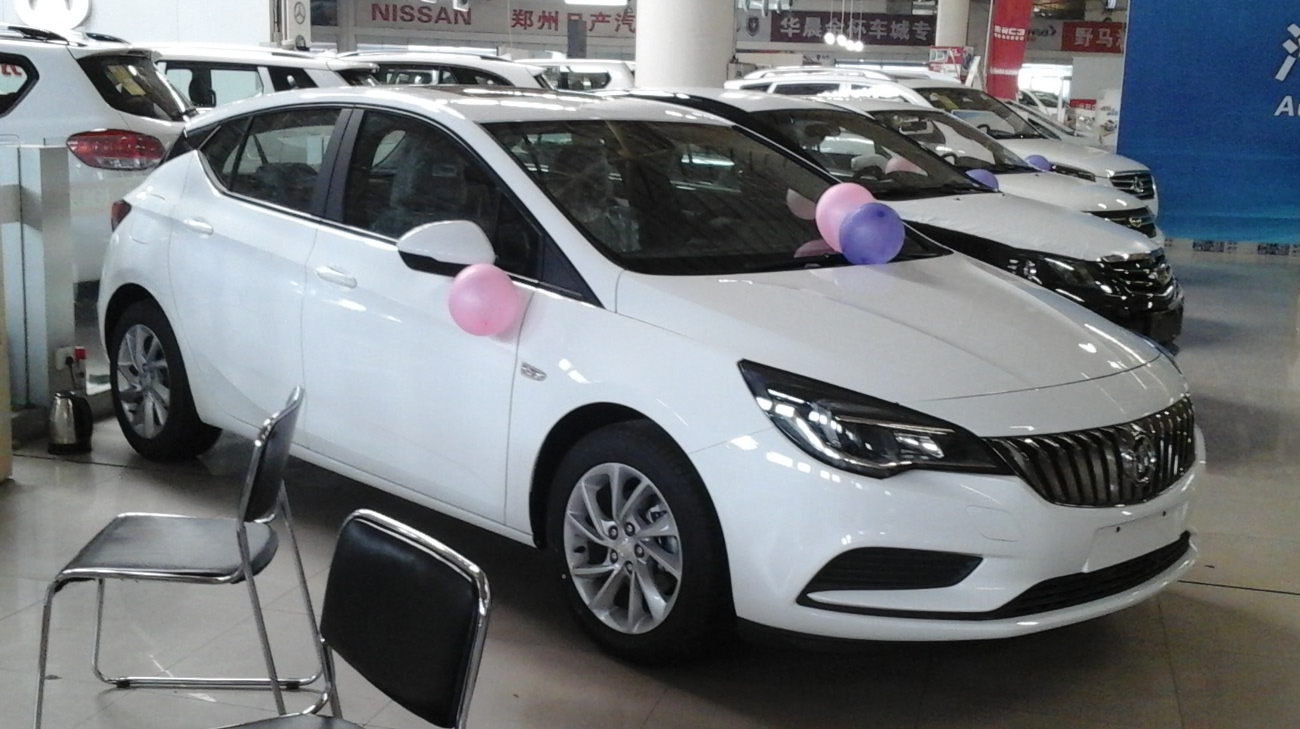
Buick Verano hatch

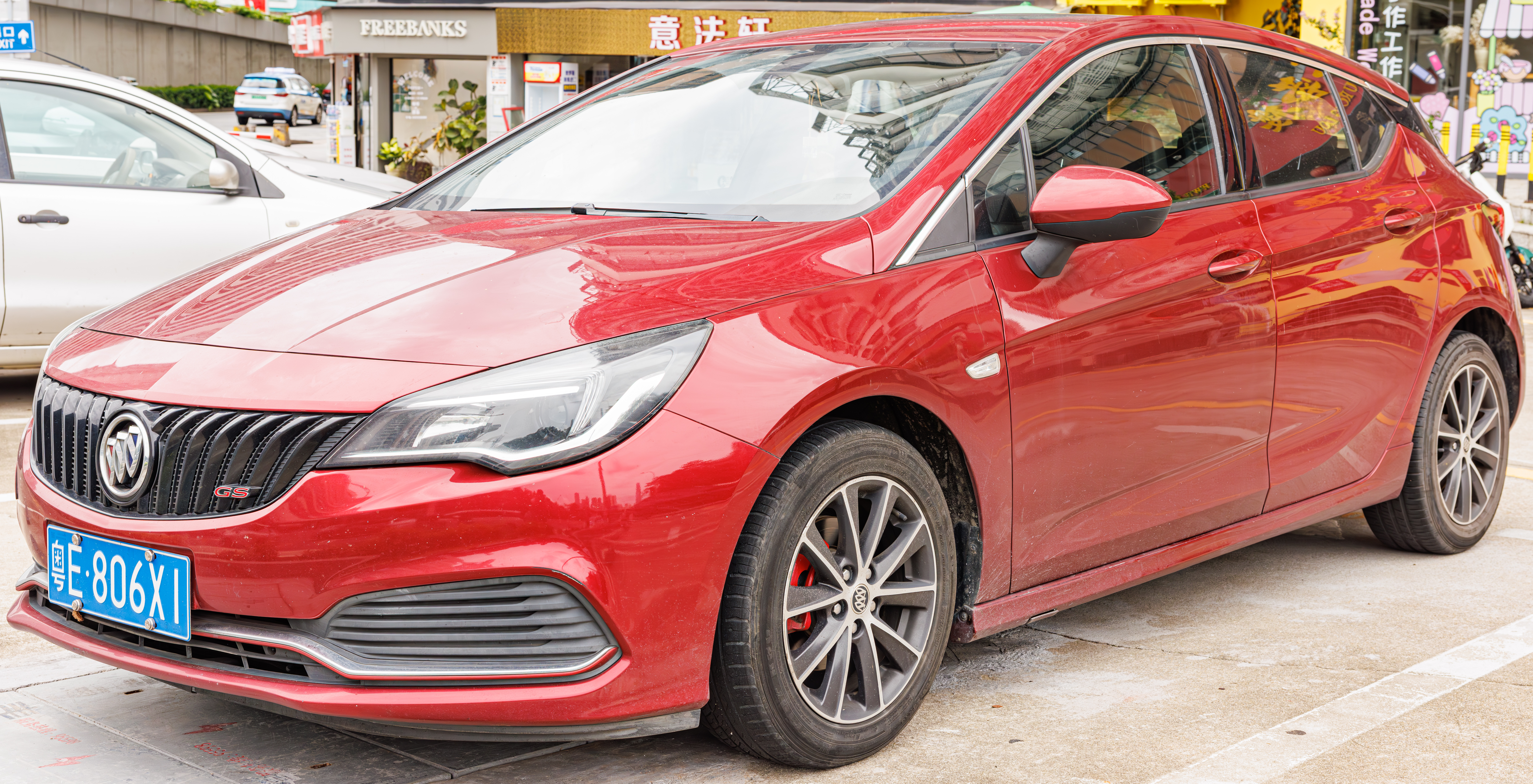
Buick Verano hatch GS

=== Cadillac ===
- ATS
- ATS-L
- CT4
- CTS (Note: produced from 2004 to 2007; imported from 2007 to 2019.)
- Escalade (Note: imported from 2006 to 2020.)
- Fleetwood Brougham
- Fleetwood
- GT4
- Optiq
- SLS
- SRX (Note: imported from 2004 to 2015.)
- XLR (Note: imported from 2005 to 2008.)
- XTS
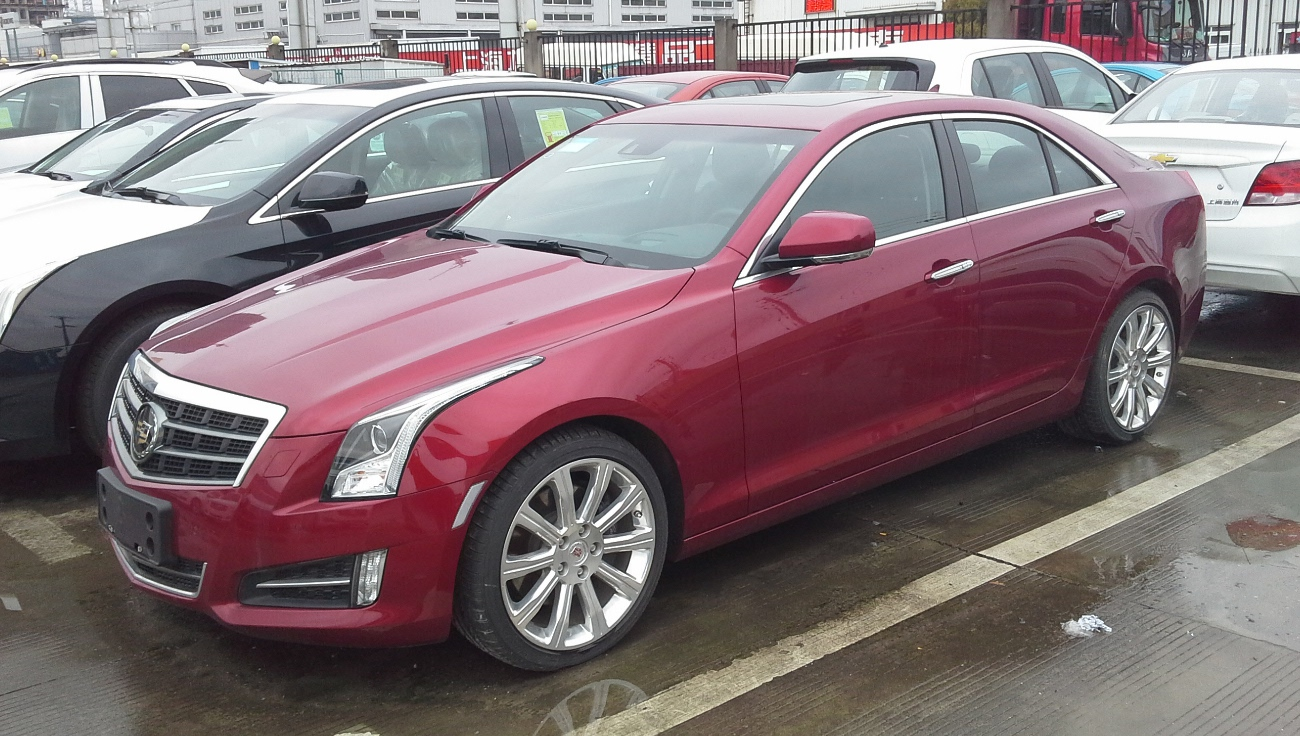
Cadillac ATS

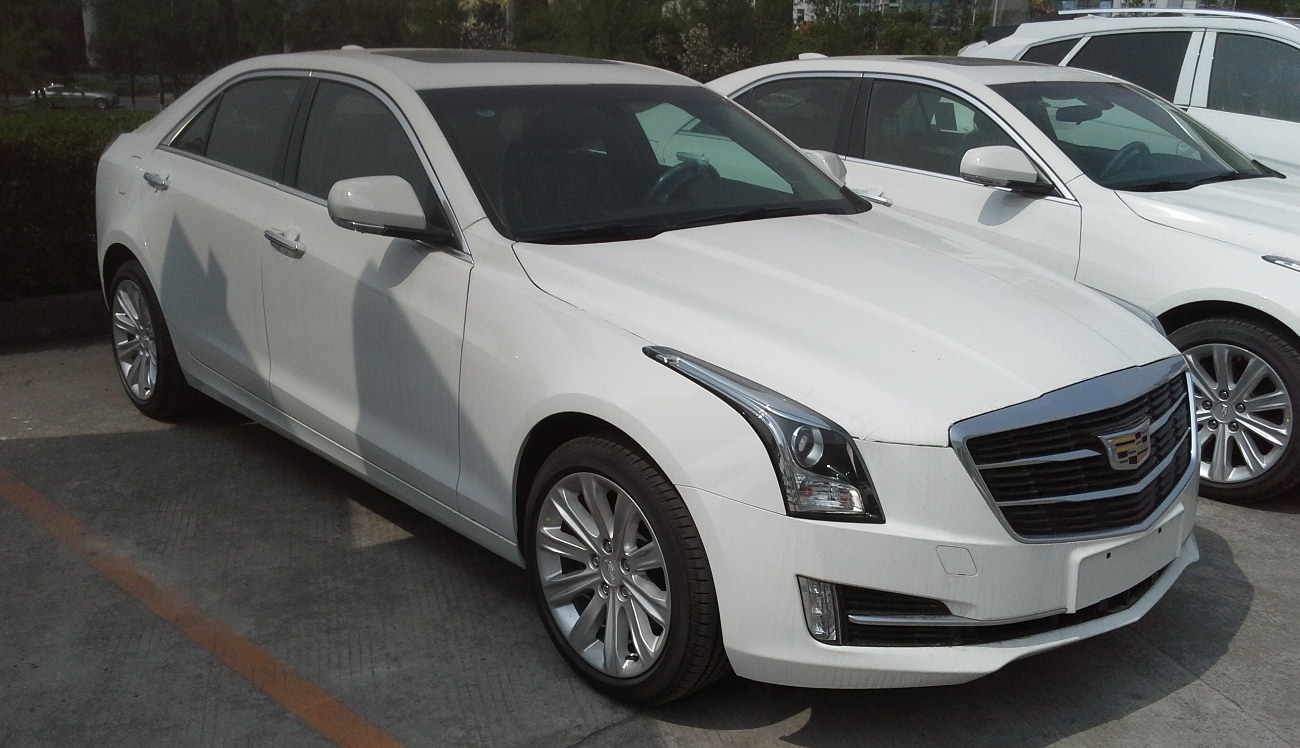
Cadillac ATS-L

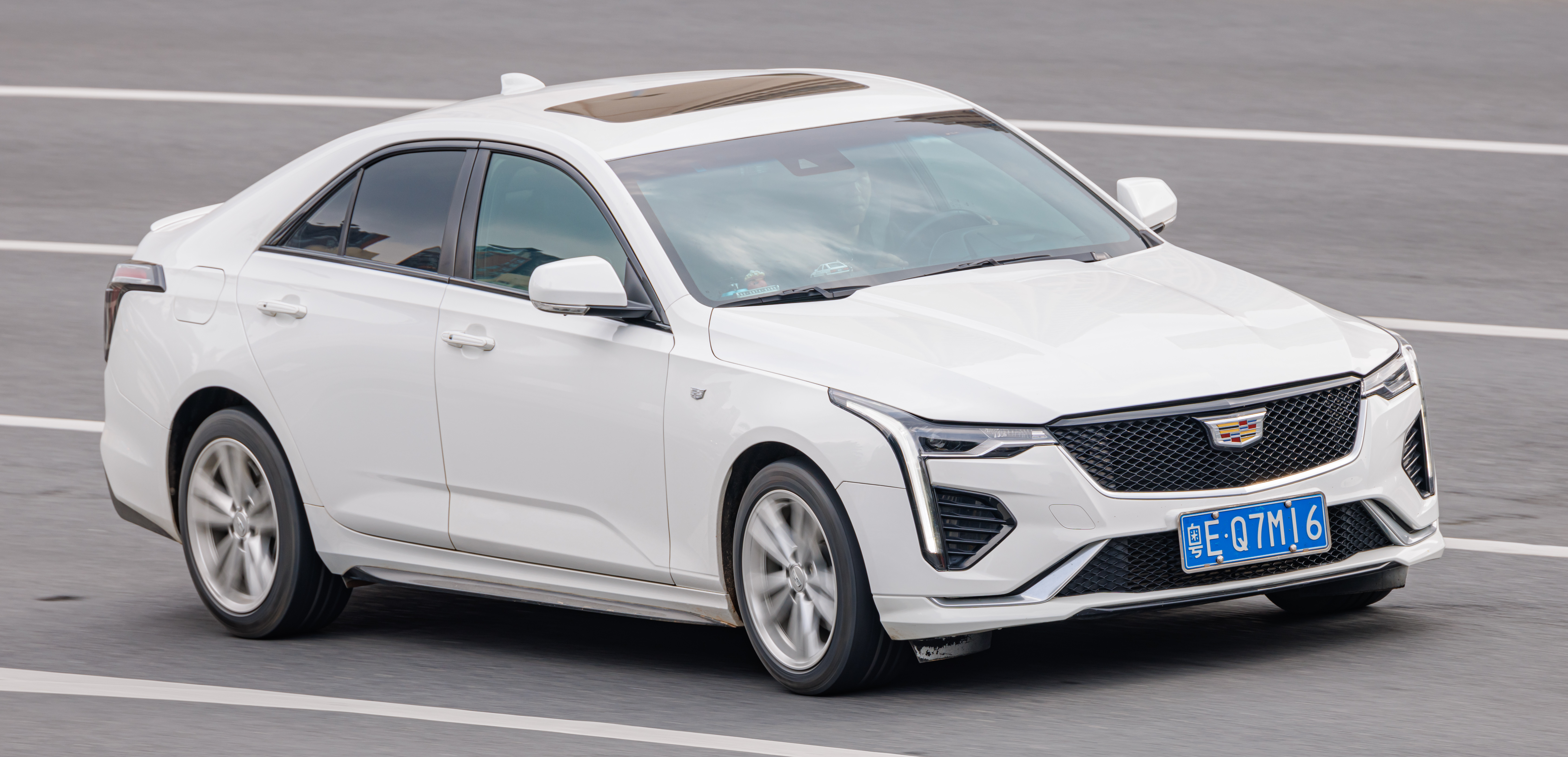
Cadillac CT4

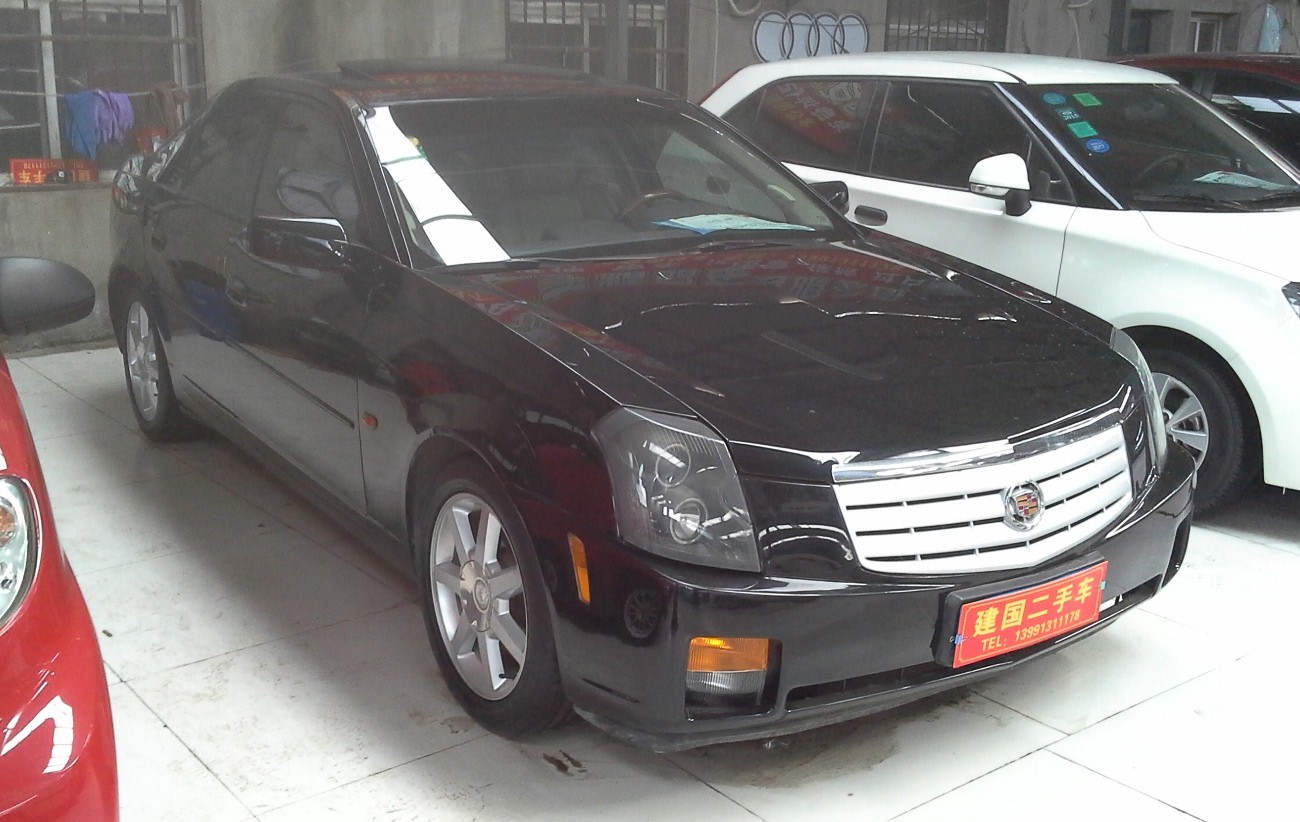
Cadillac CTS I

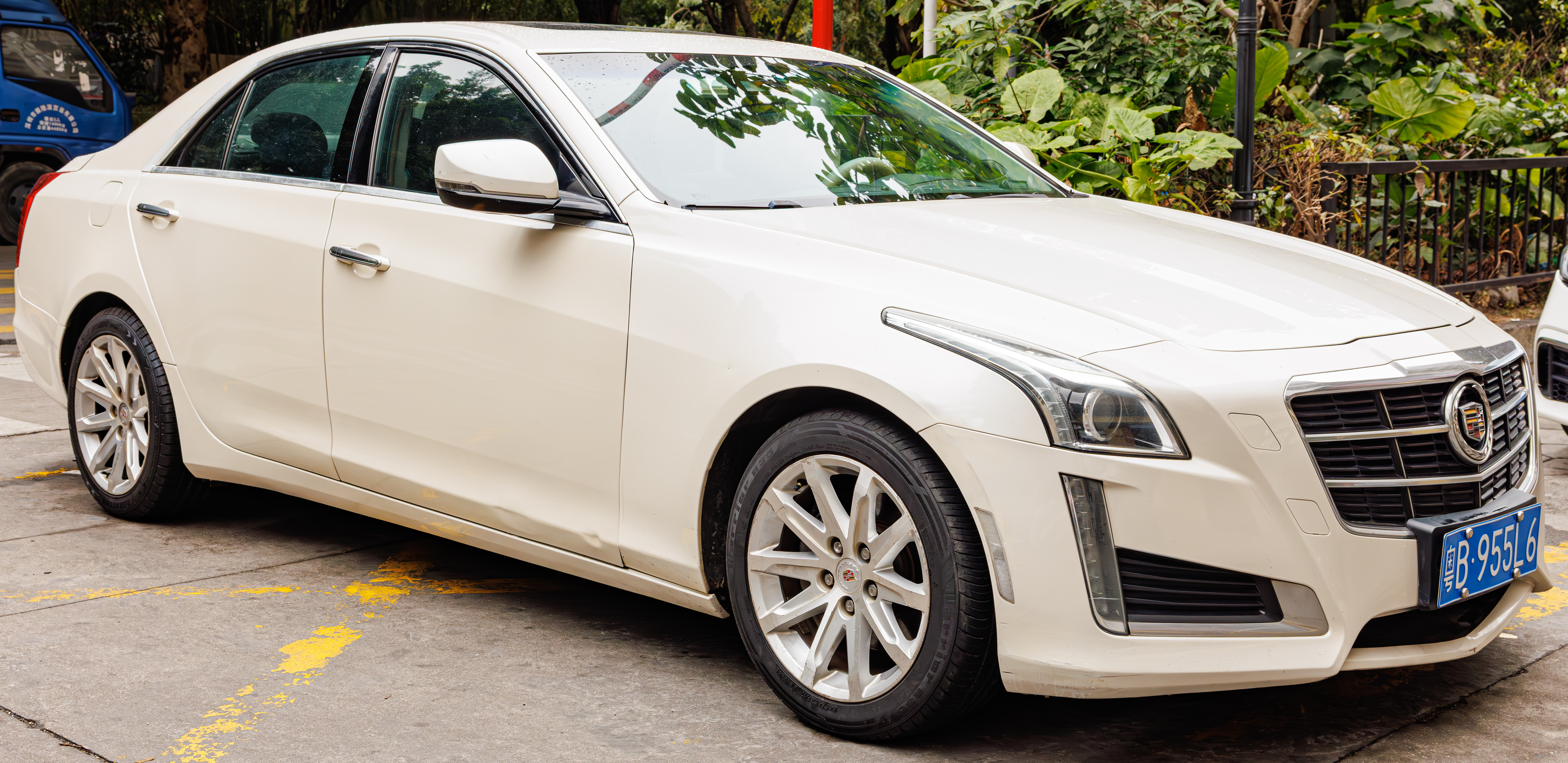
Cadillac CTS III

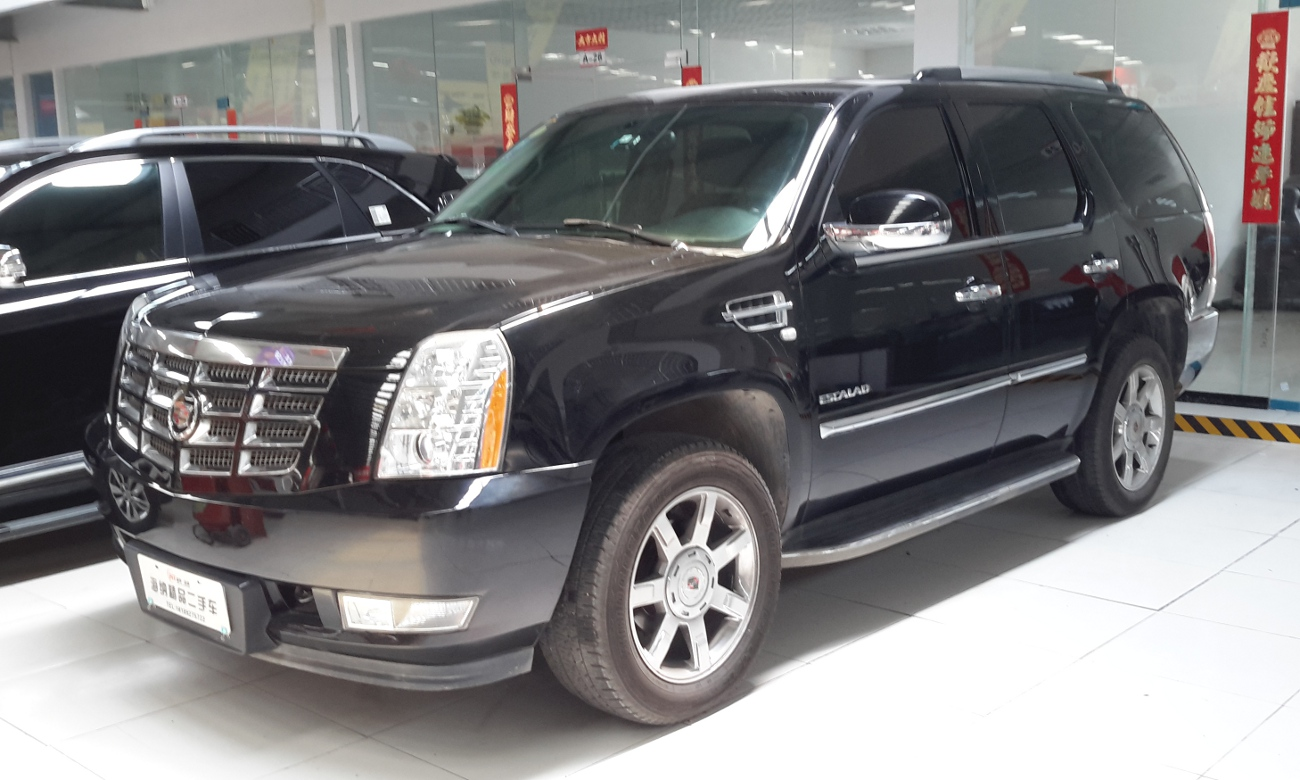
Cadillac Escalade III

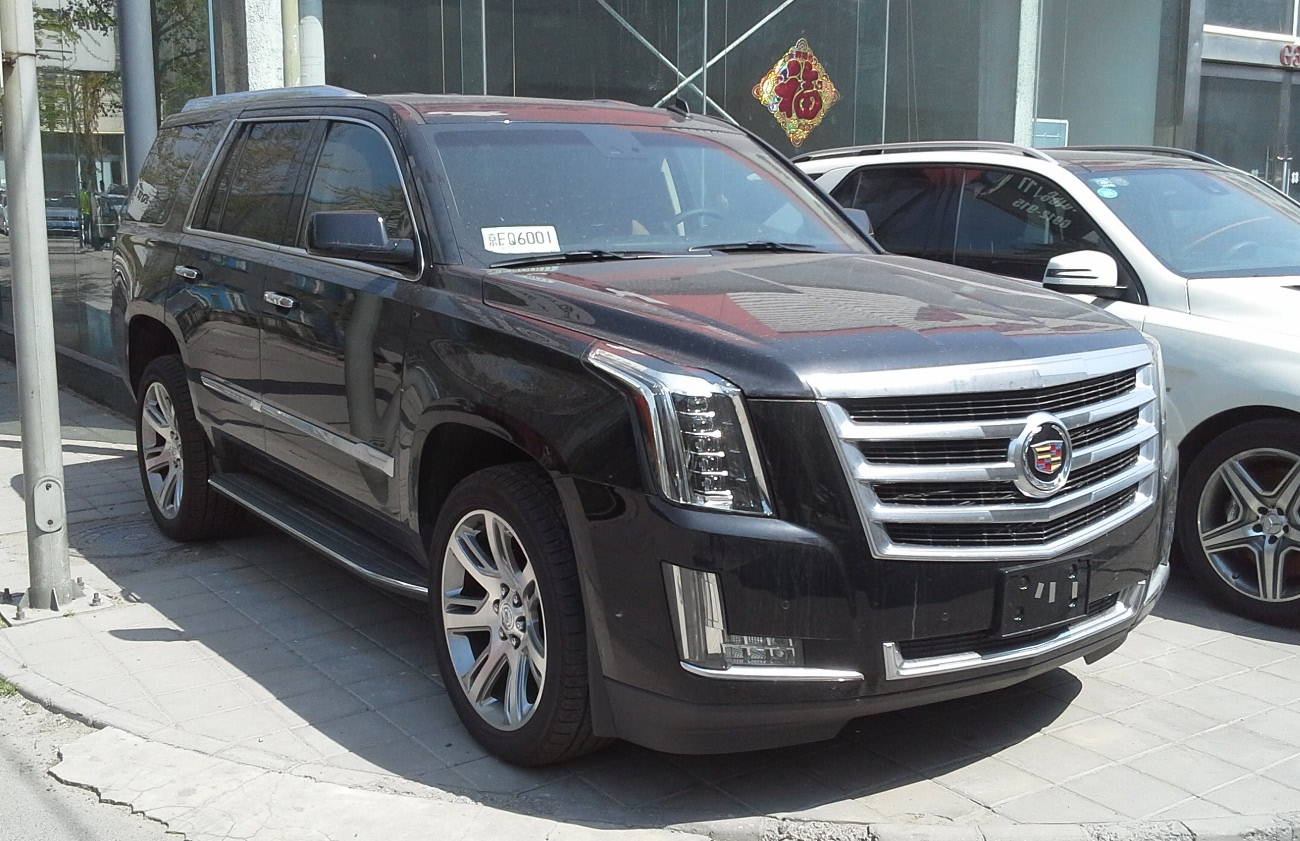
Cadillac Escalade IV

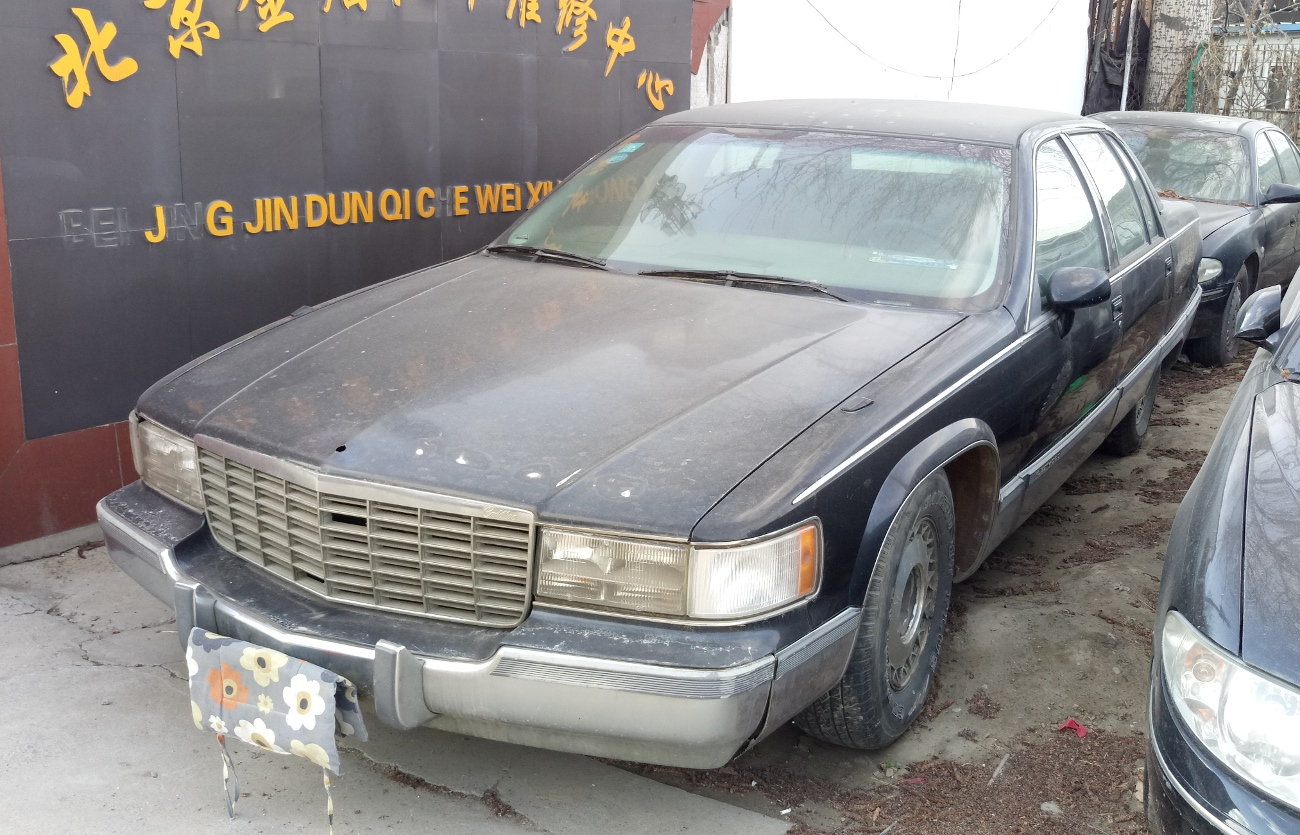
Cadillac Fleetwood Brougham

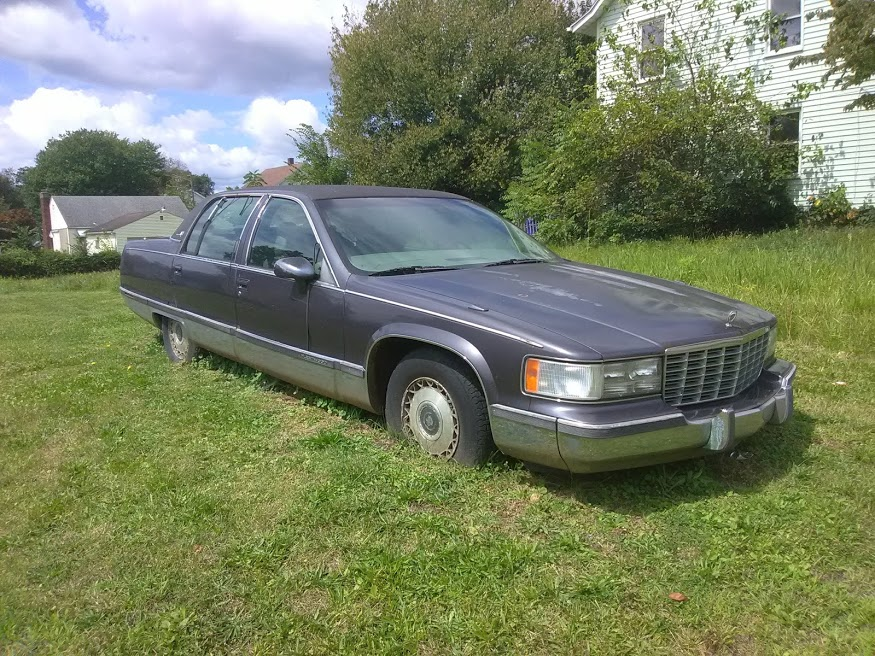
Cadillac Fleetwood

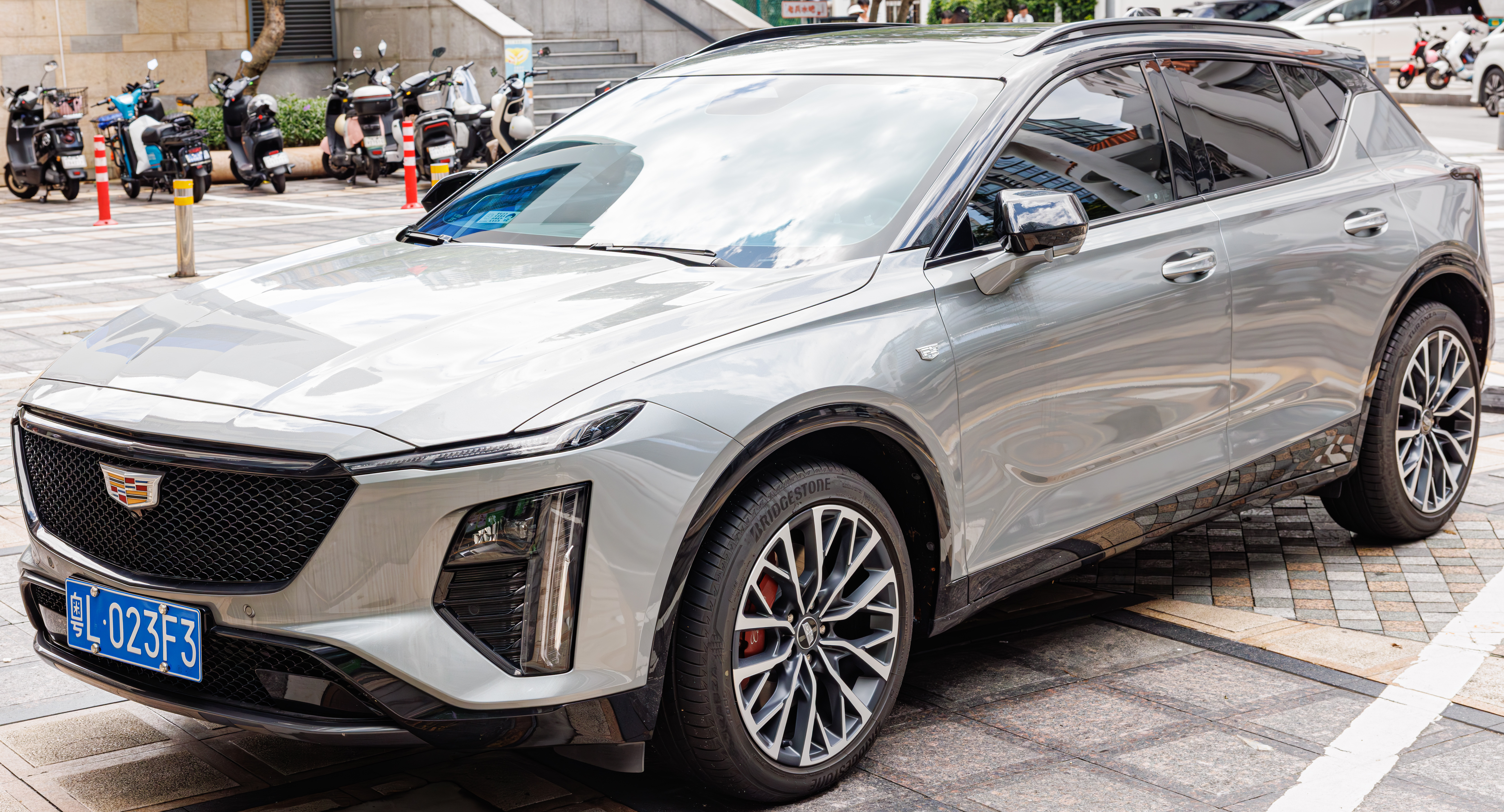
Cadillac GT4

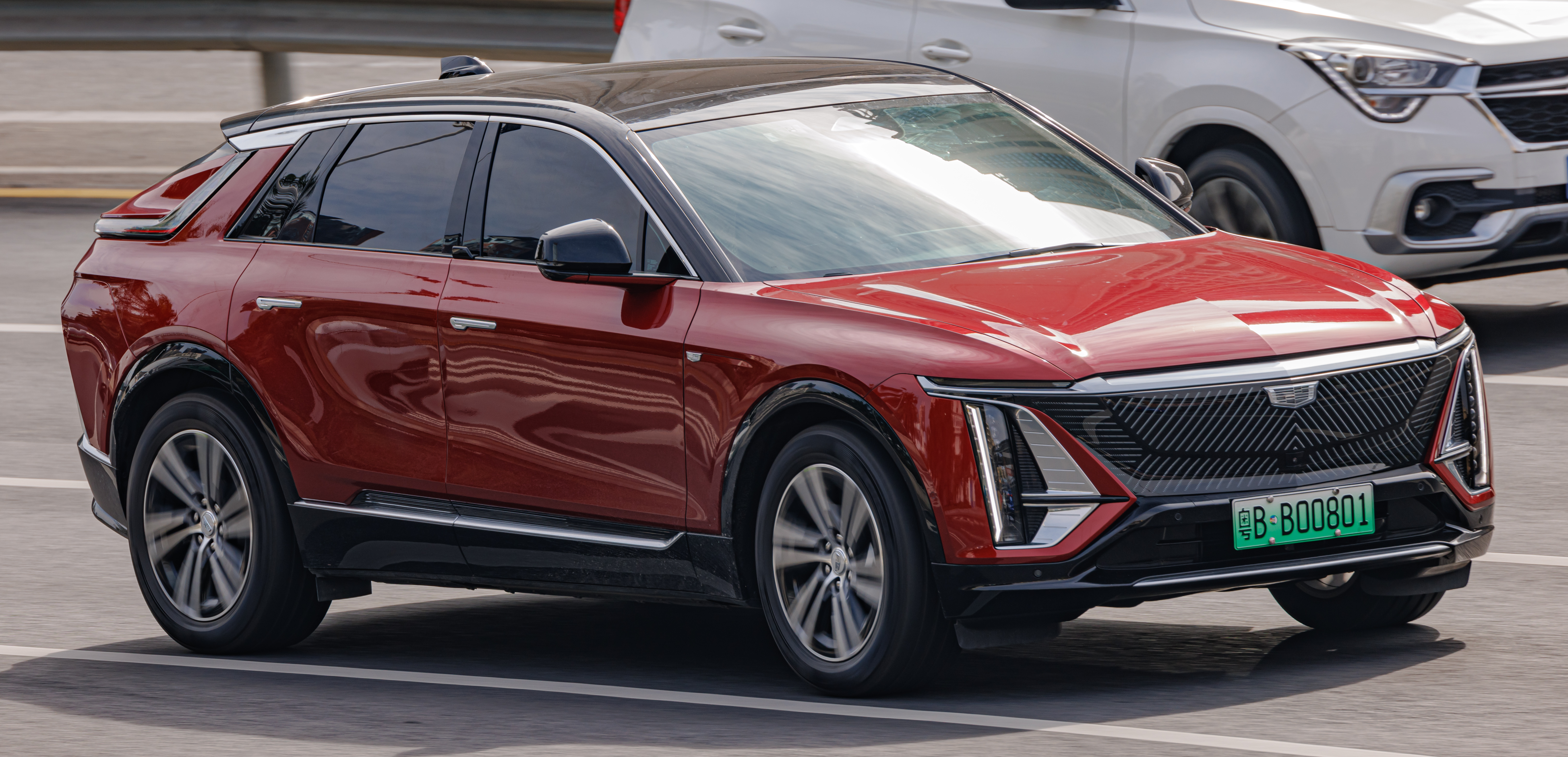
Cadillac Lyriq

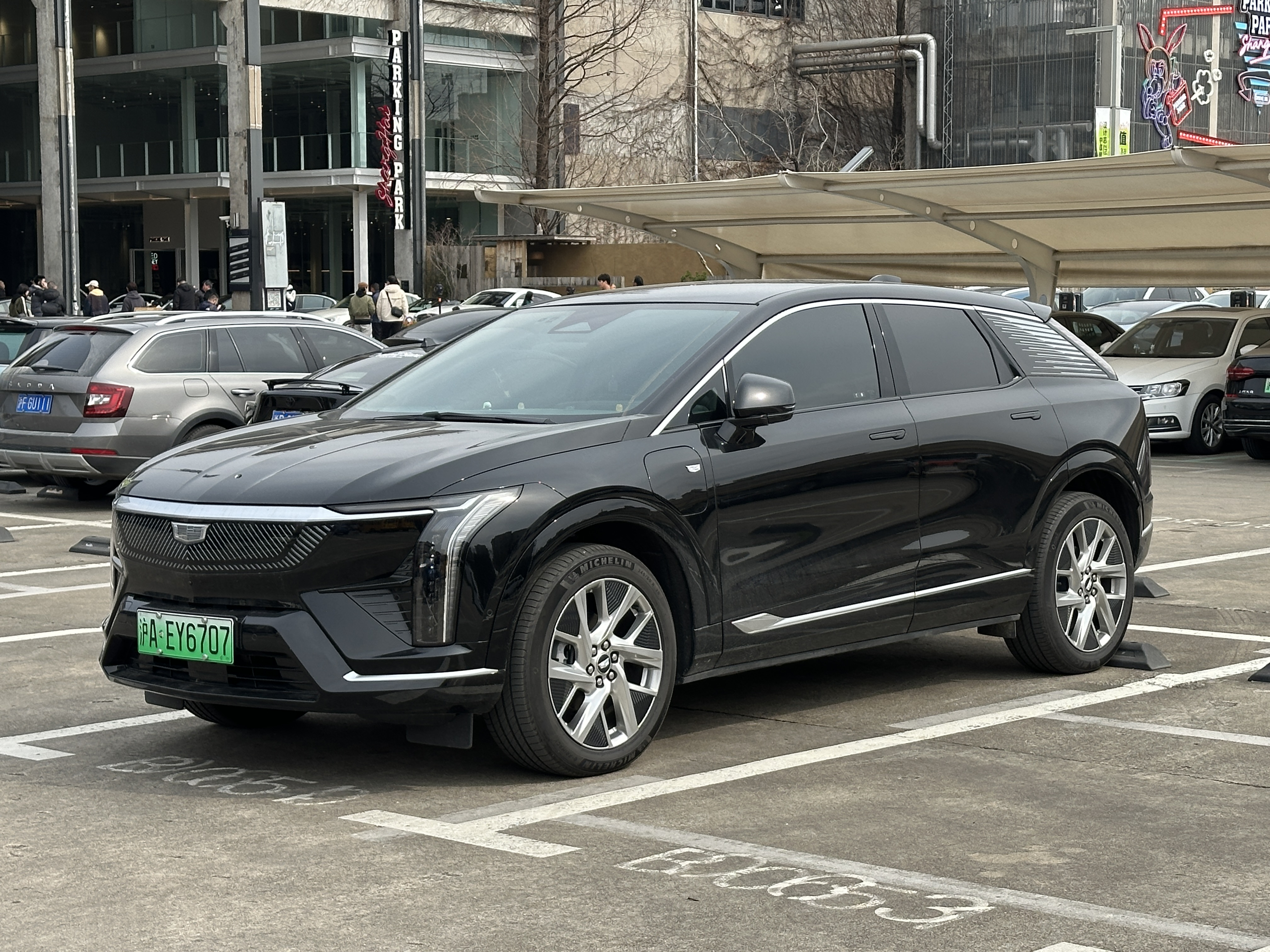
Cadillac Optiq

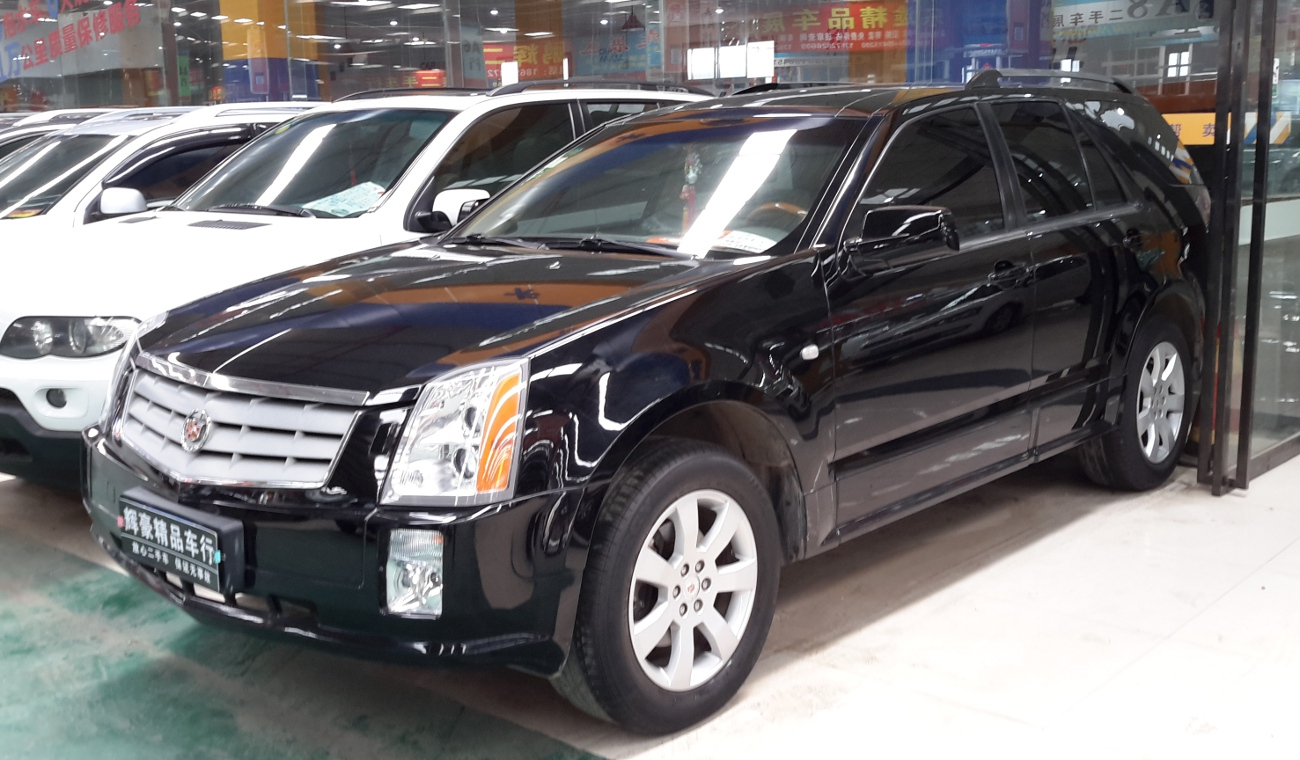
Cadillac SRX I

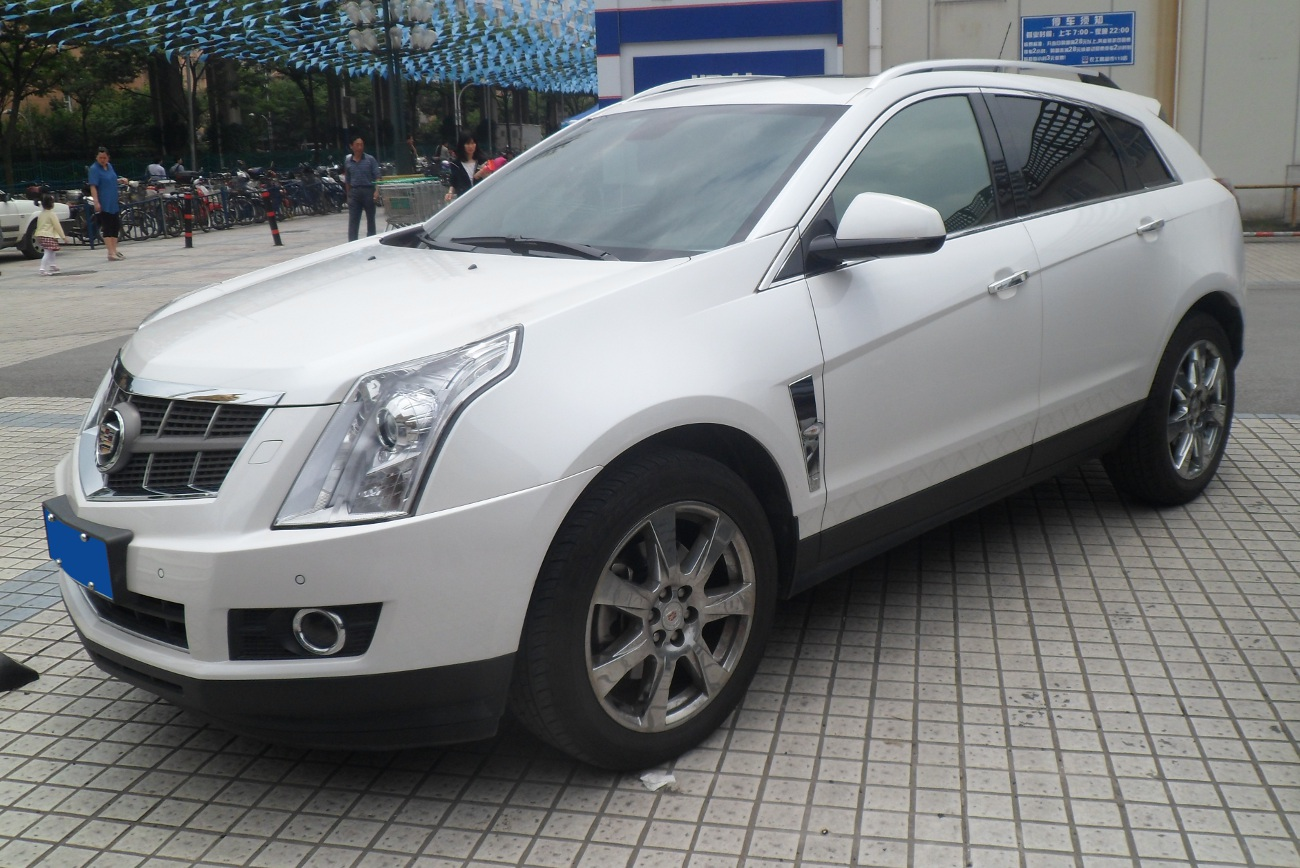
Cadillac SRX II

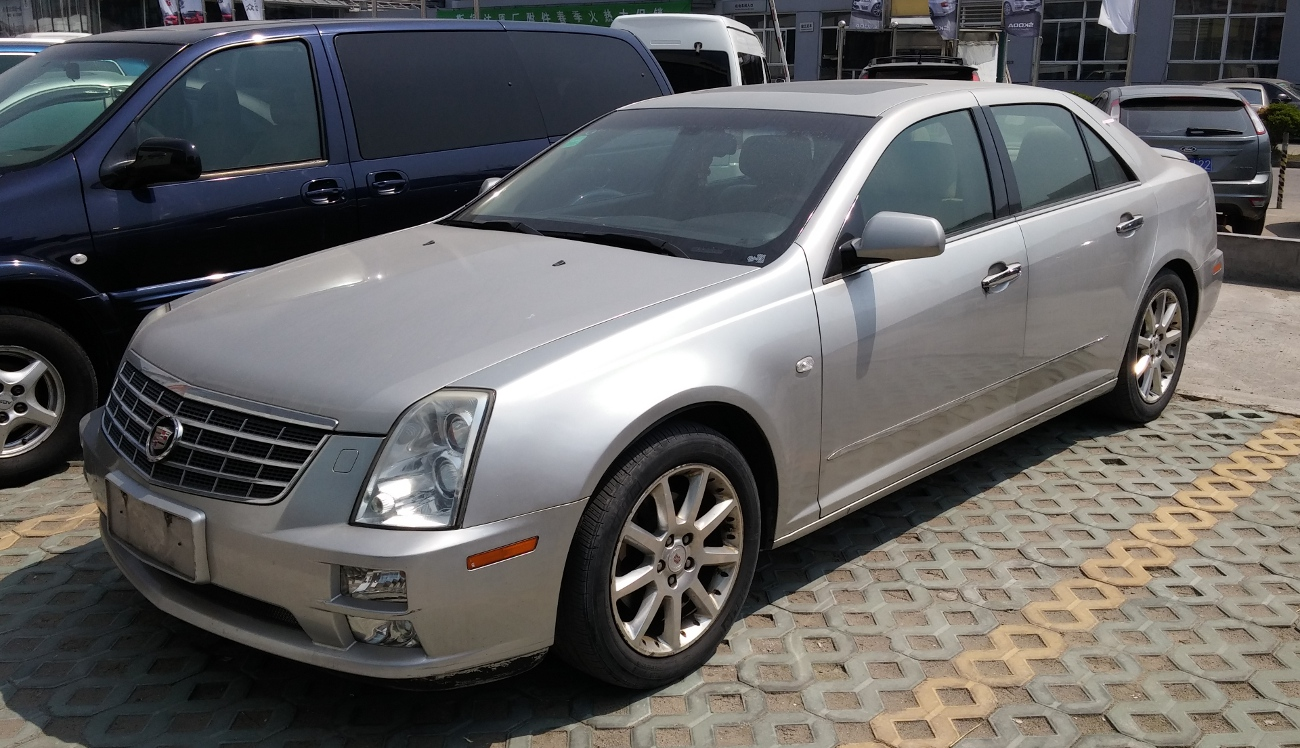
Cadillac SLS

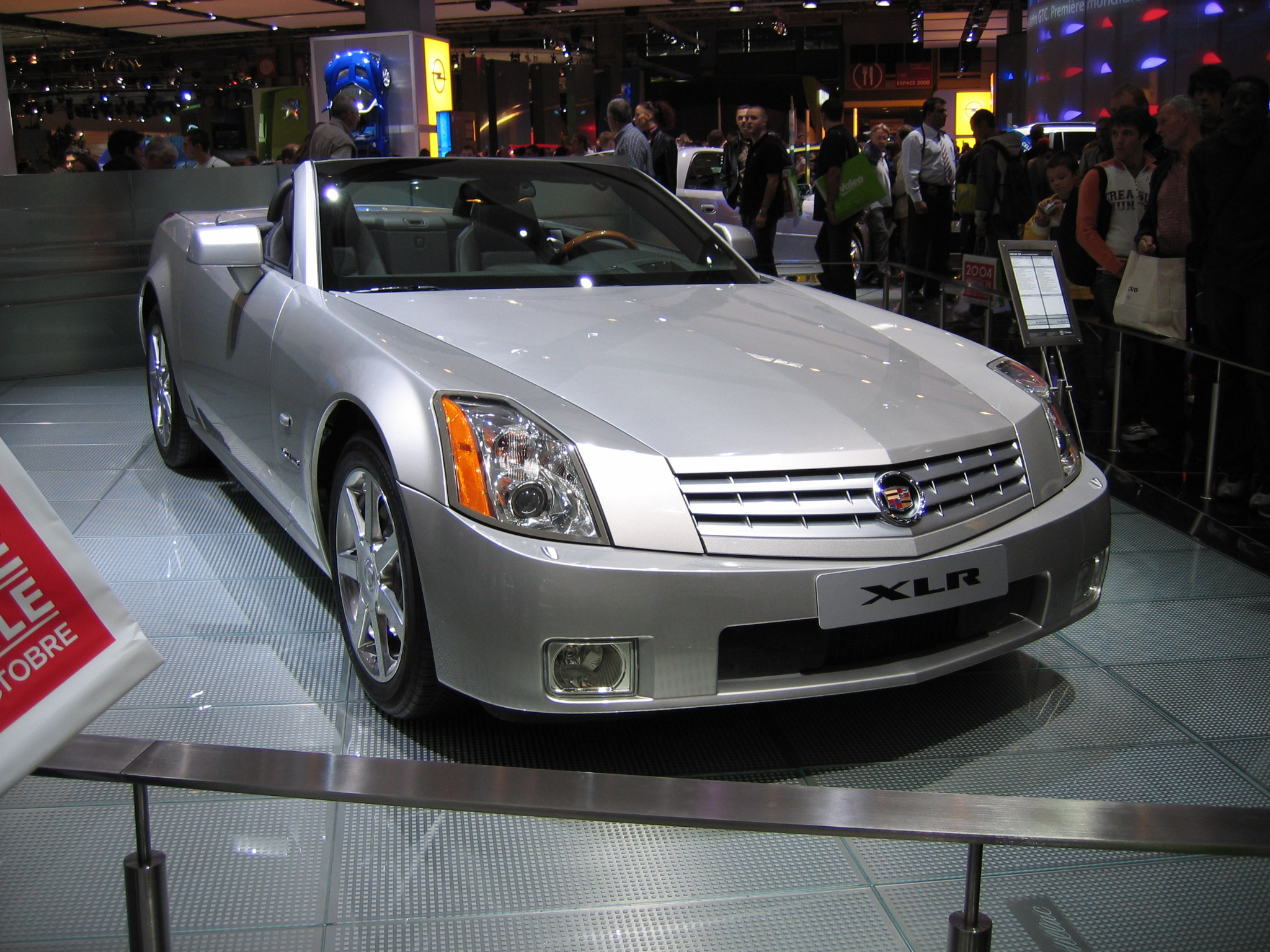
Cadillac XLR

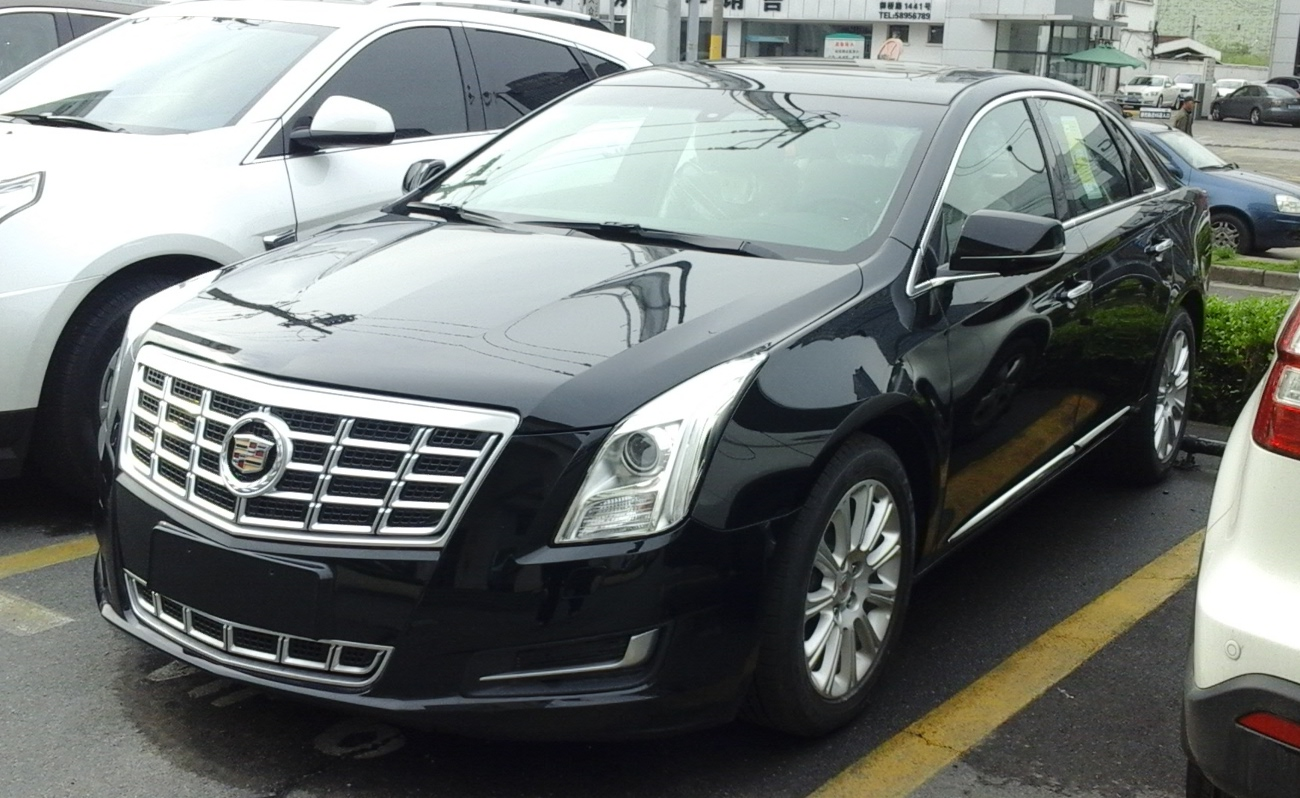
Cadillac XTS I

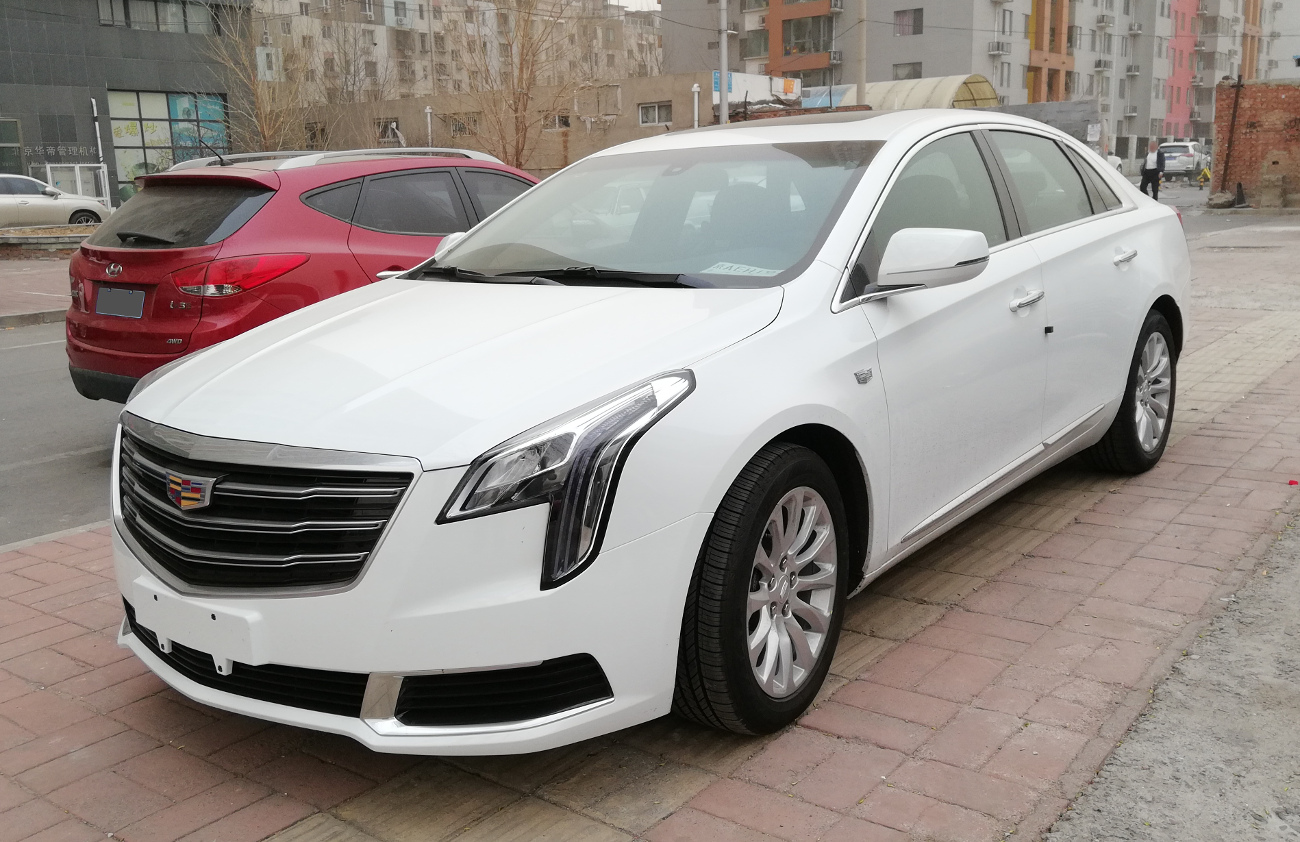
Cadillac XTS II

=== Chevrolet ===
- Aveo
- Camaro RS
- Caprice Classic
- Captiva
- Cavalier
- Corsica
- Corvette (C4)
- Corvette (C6)
- Corvette (C7)
- Cruze
- Colorado
- Epica
- Epica II
- Lova
- Lova RV
- Lumina APV
- Malibu
- Malibu XL
- Menlo
- Onix
- Orlando
- Sail
- Seeker
- Spark
- Silverado
- Tracker
- Trax
- Trailblazer
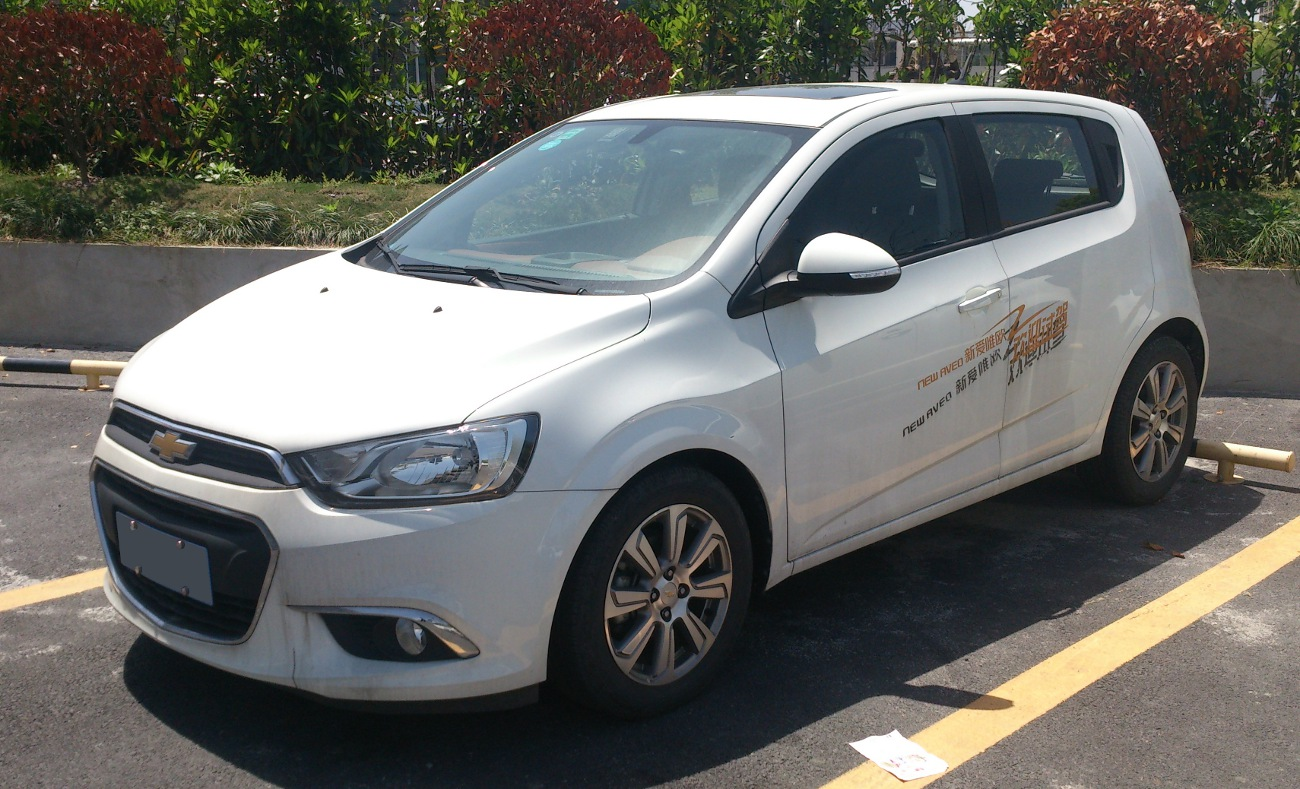
Chevrolet Aveo

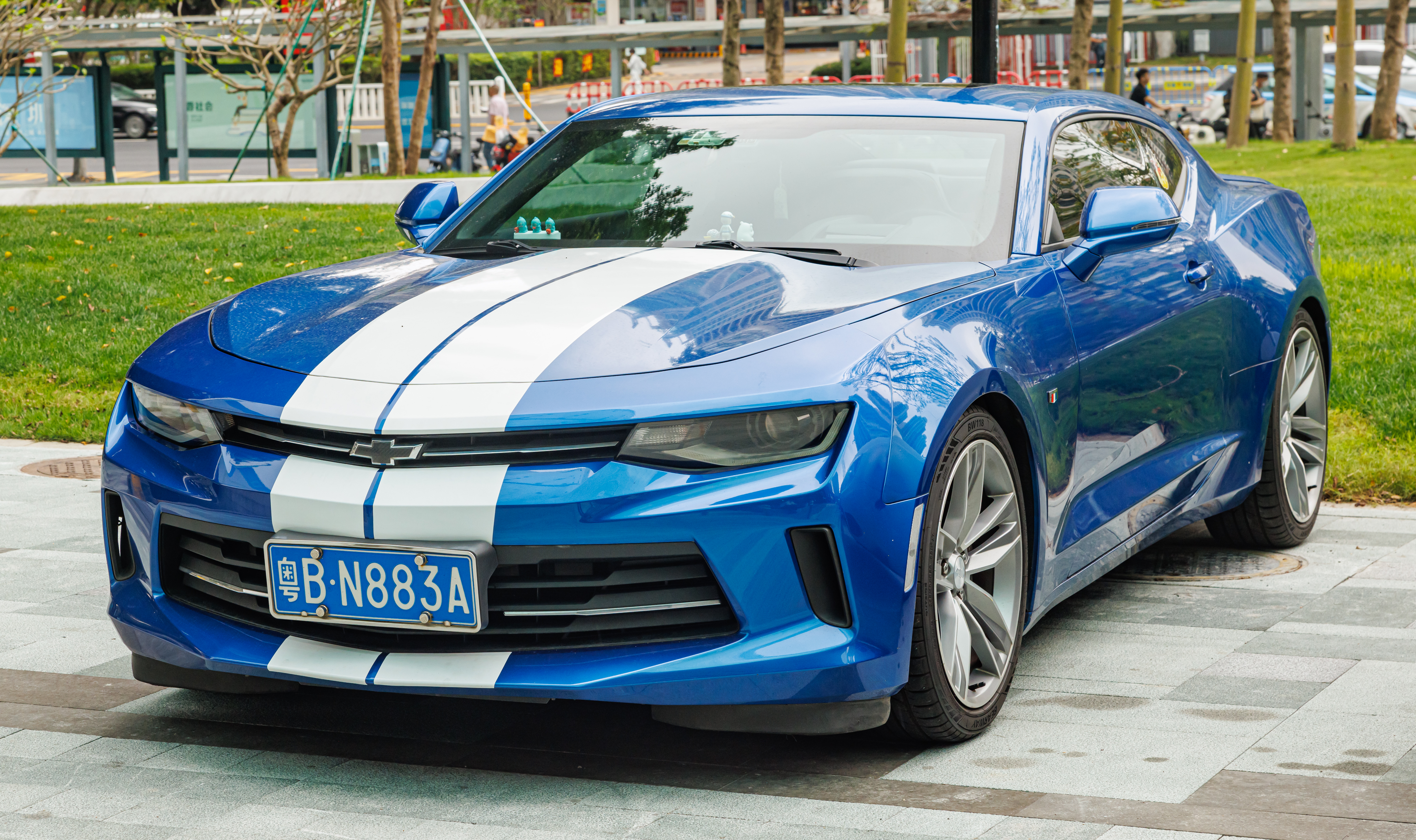
Chevrolet Camaro VI

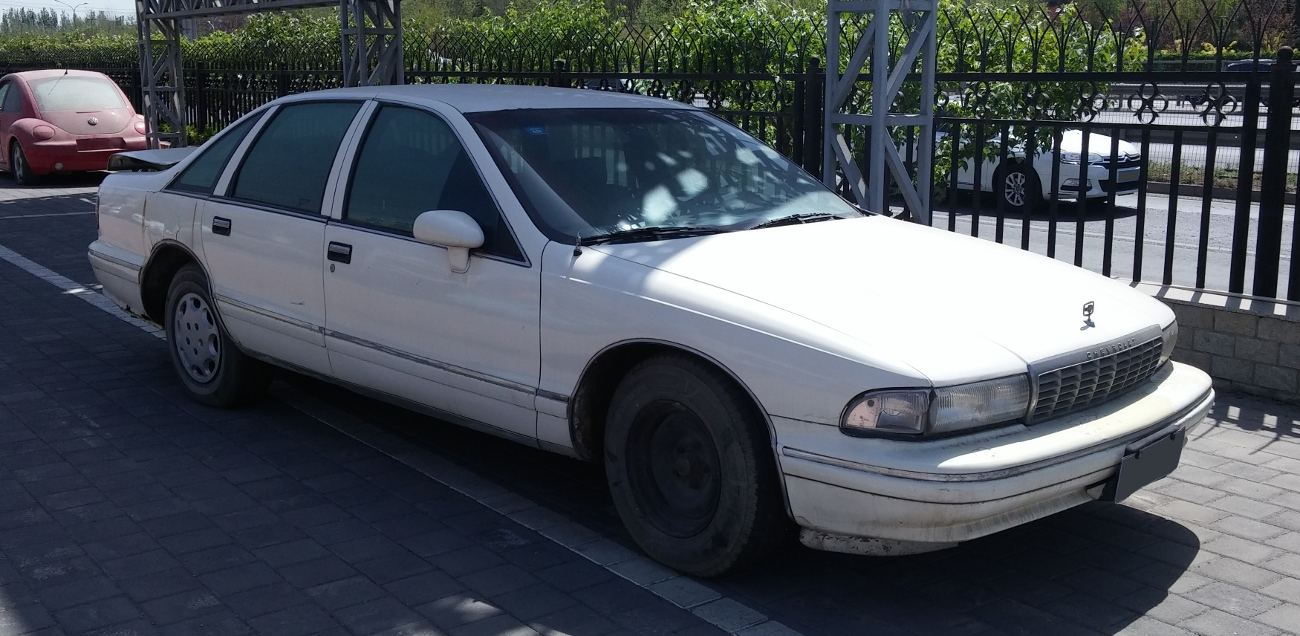
Chevrolet Caprice

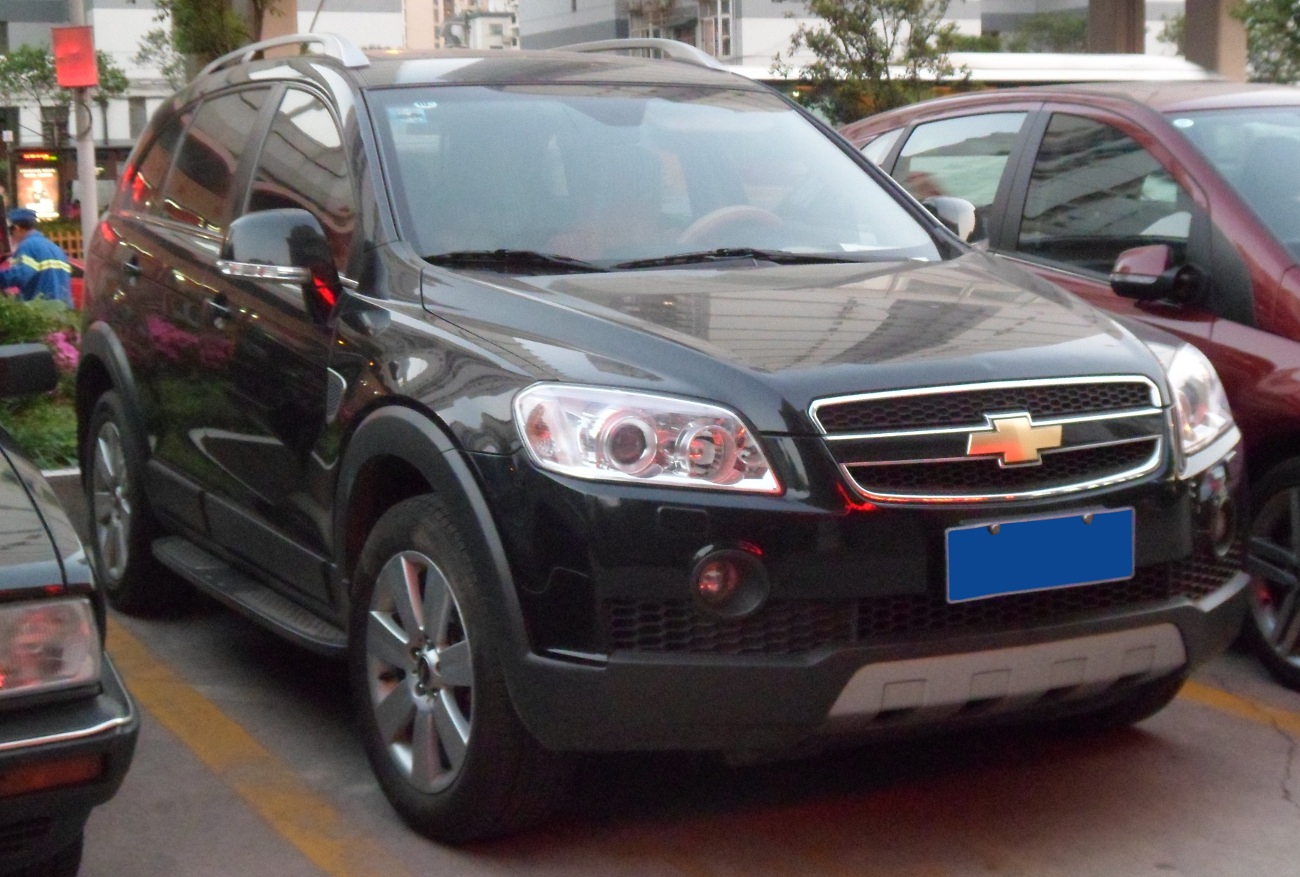
Chevrolet Captiva I

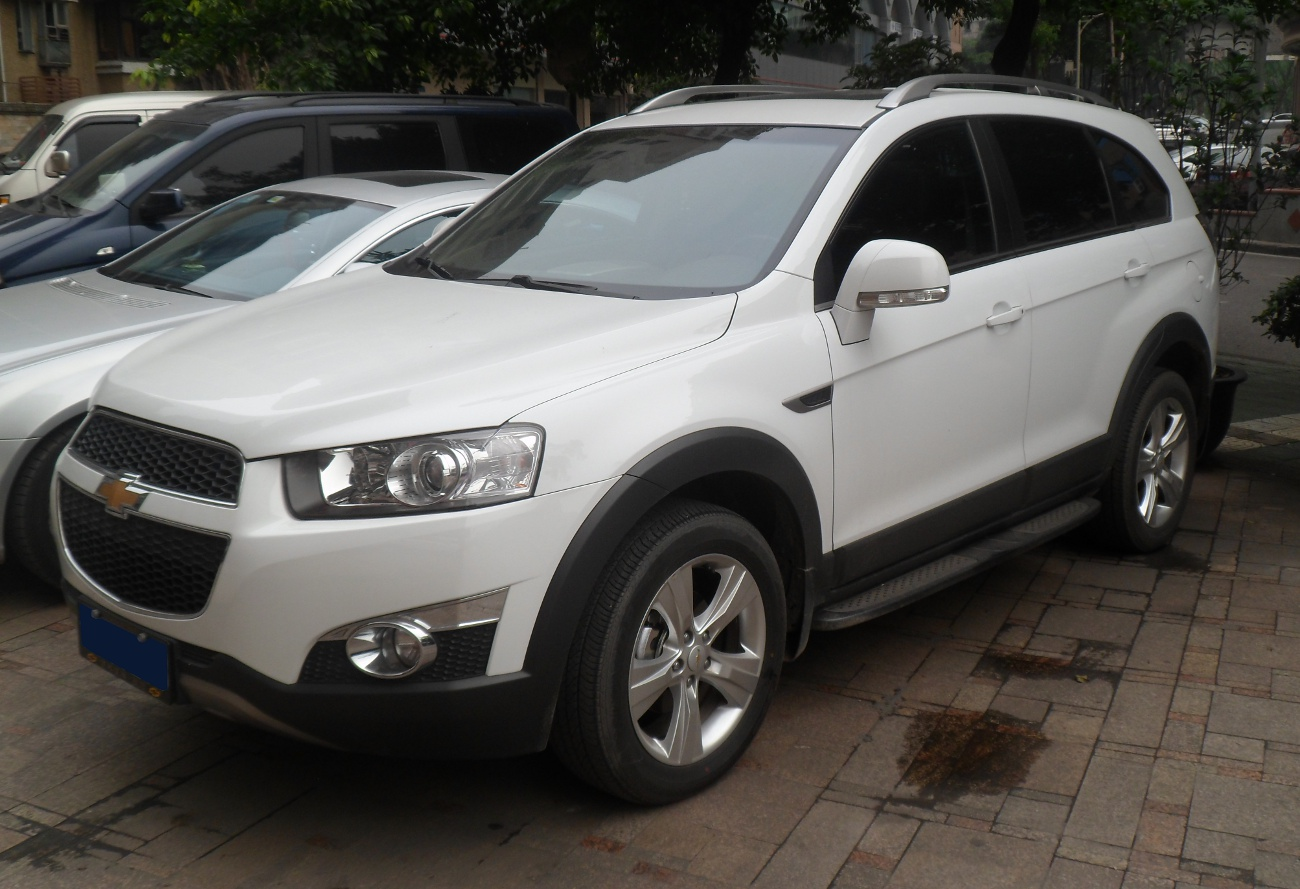
Chevrolet Captiva II

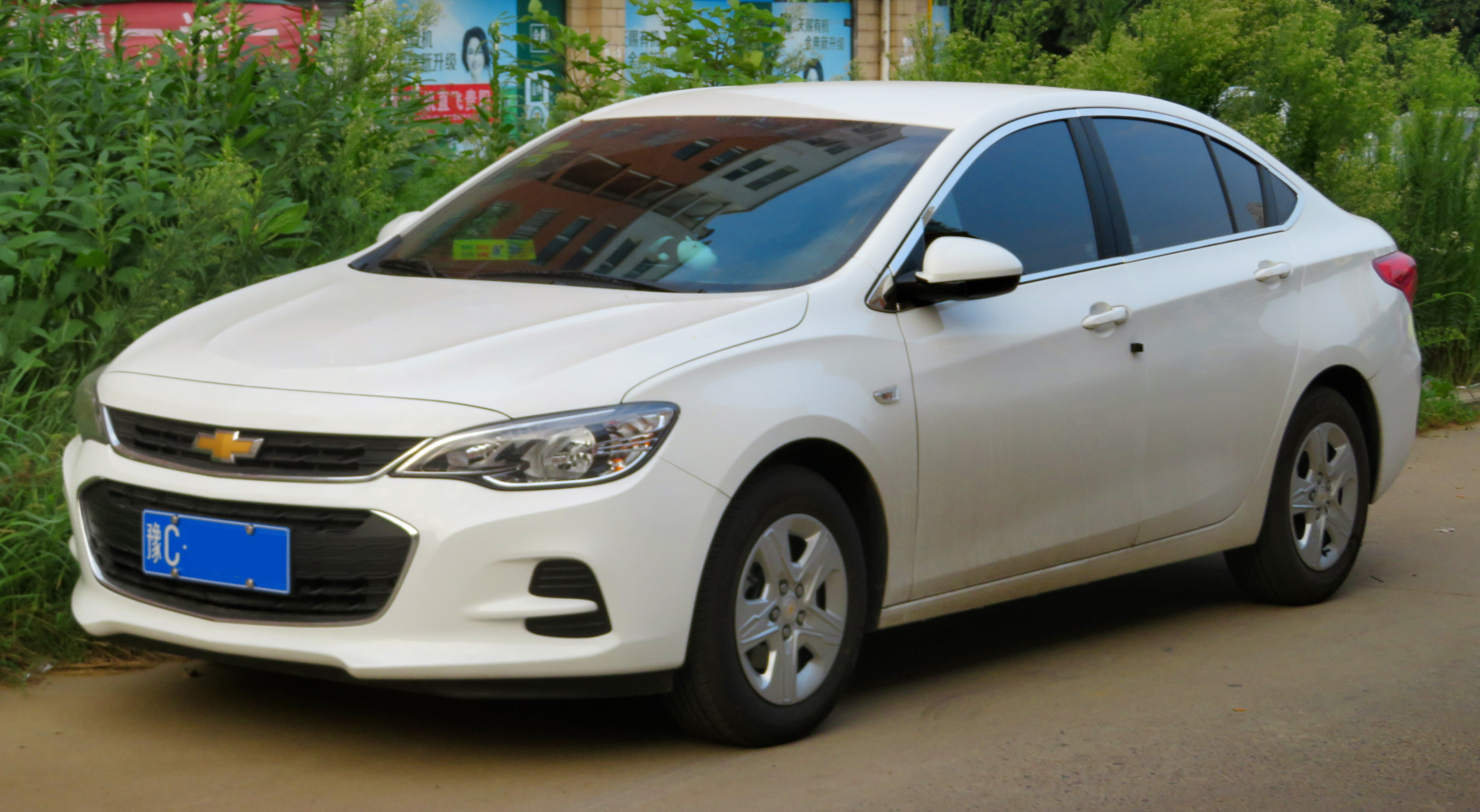
Chevrolet Cavalier

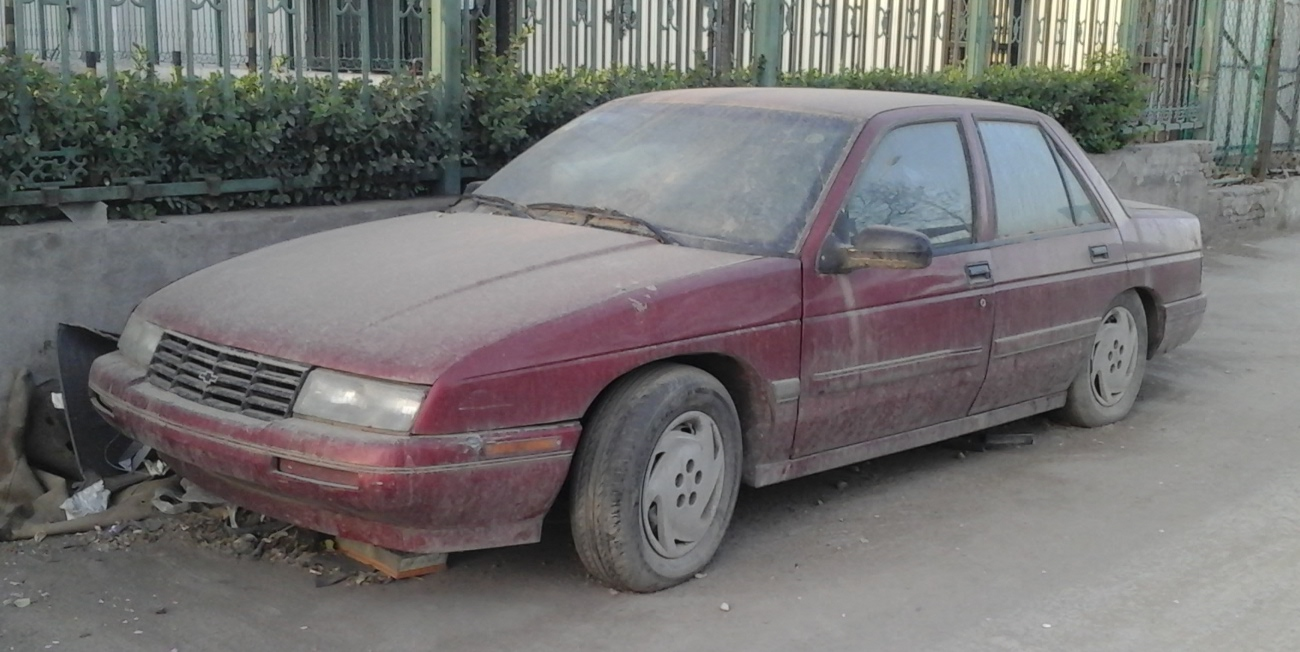
Chevrolet Corsica

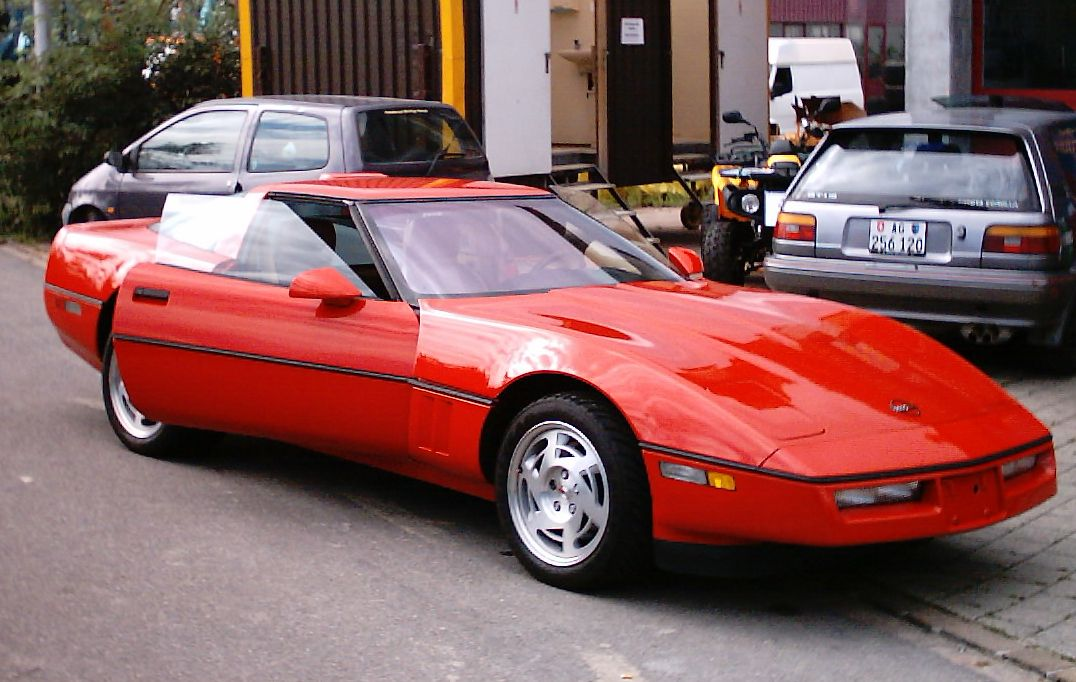
Chevrolet Corvette C4

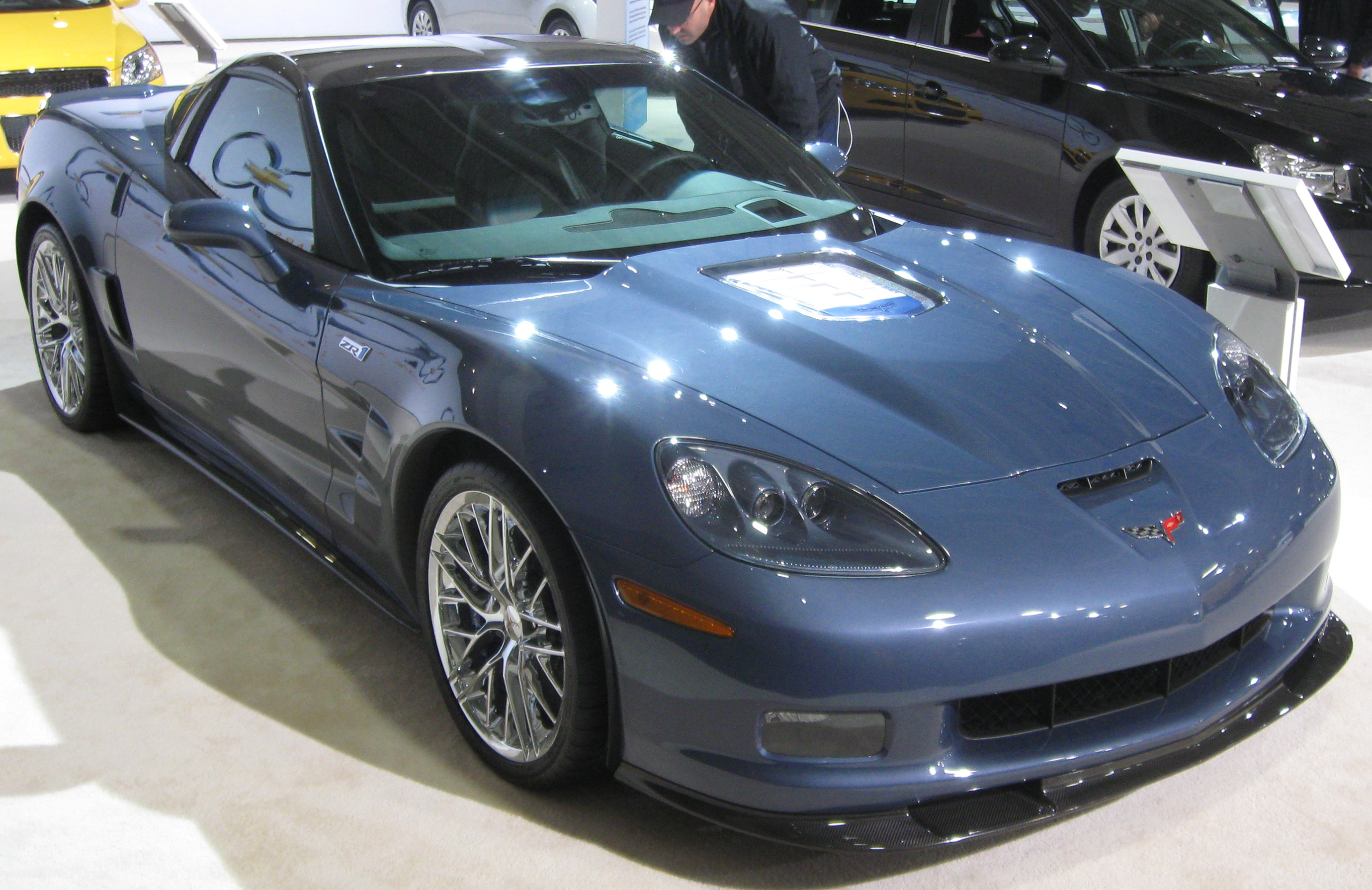
Chevrolet Corvette C6

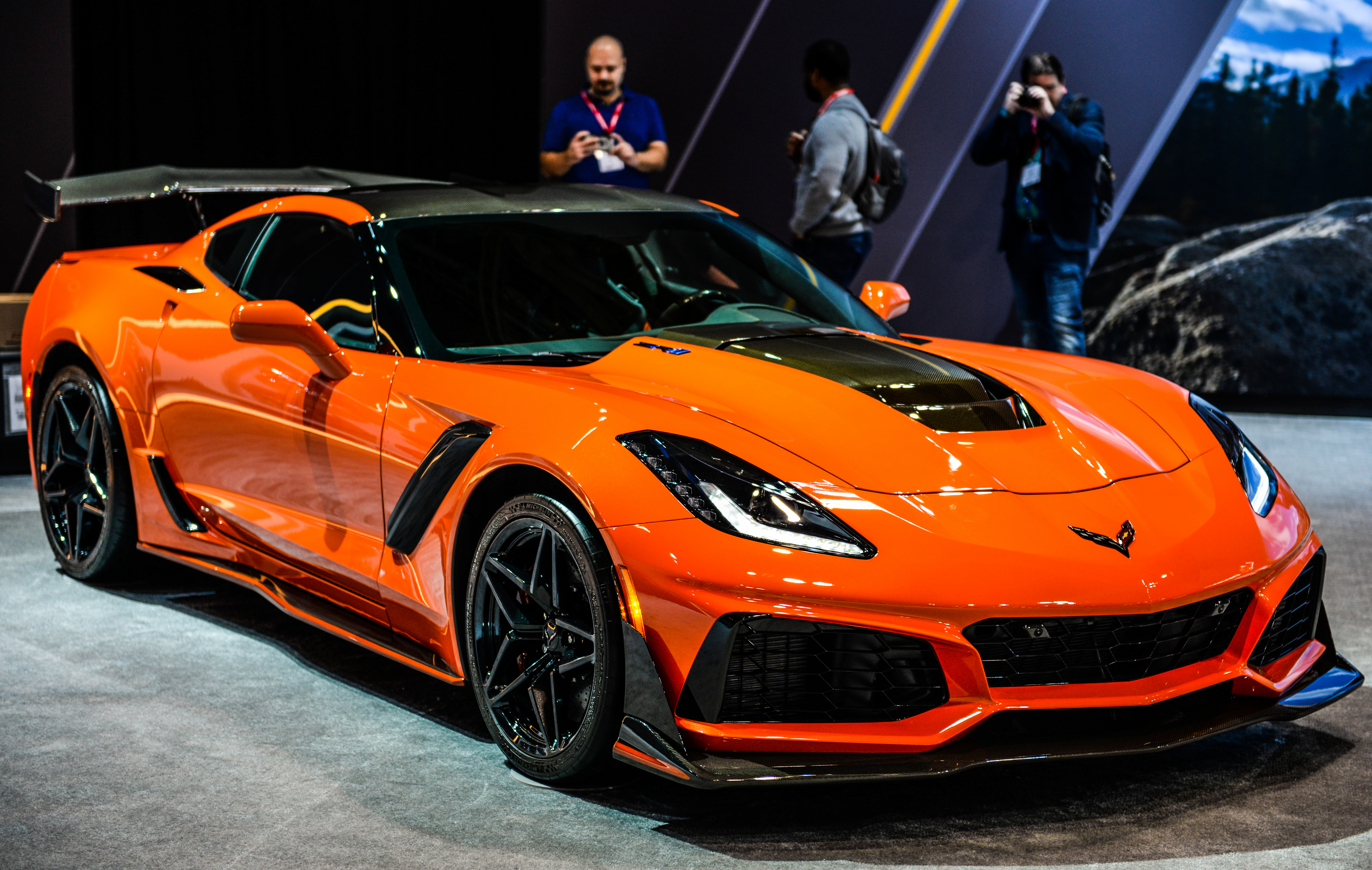
Chevrolet Corvette C7

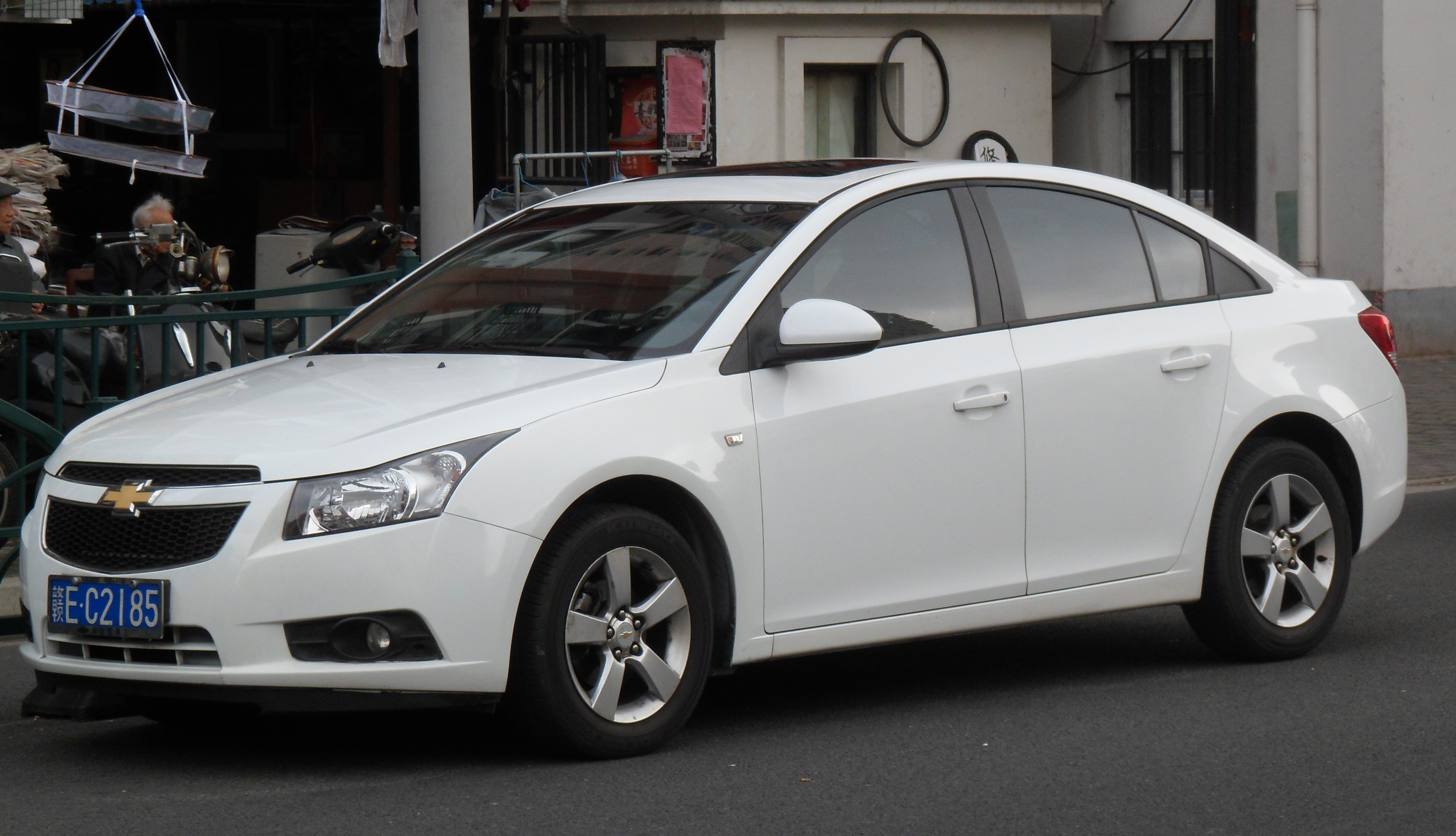
Chevrolet Cruze I

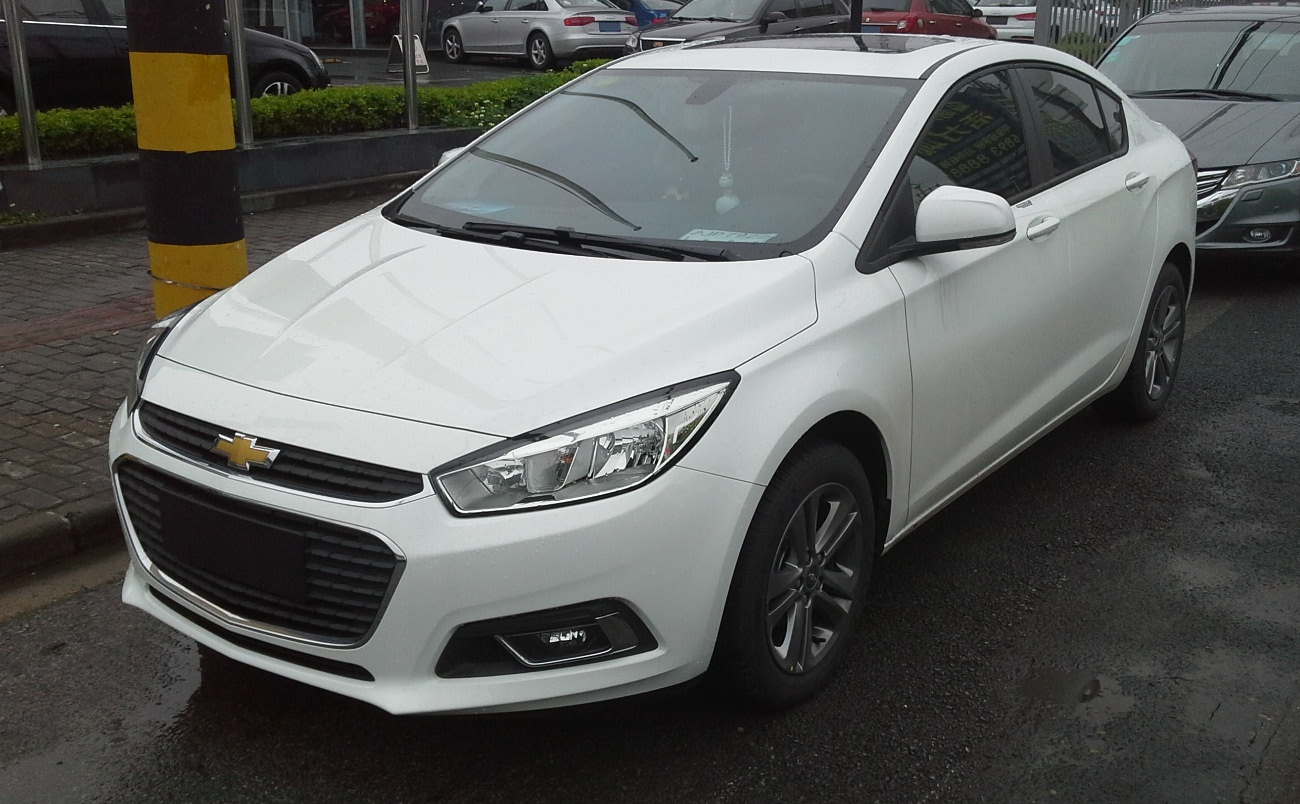
Chevrolet Cruze II

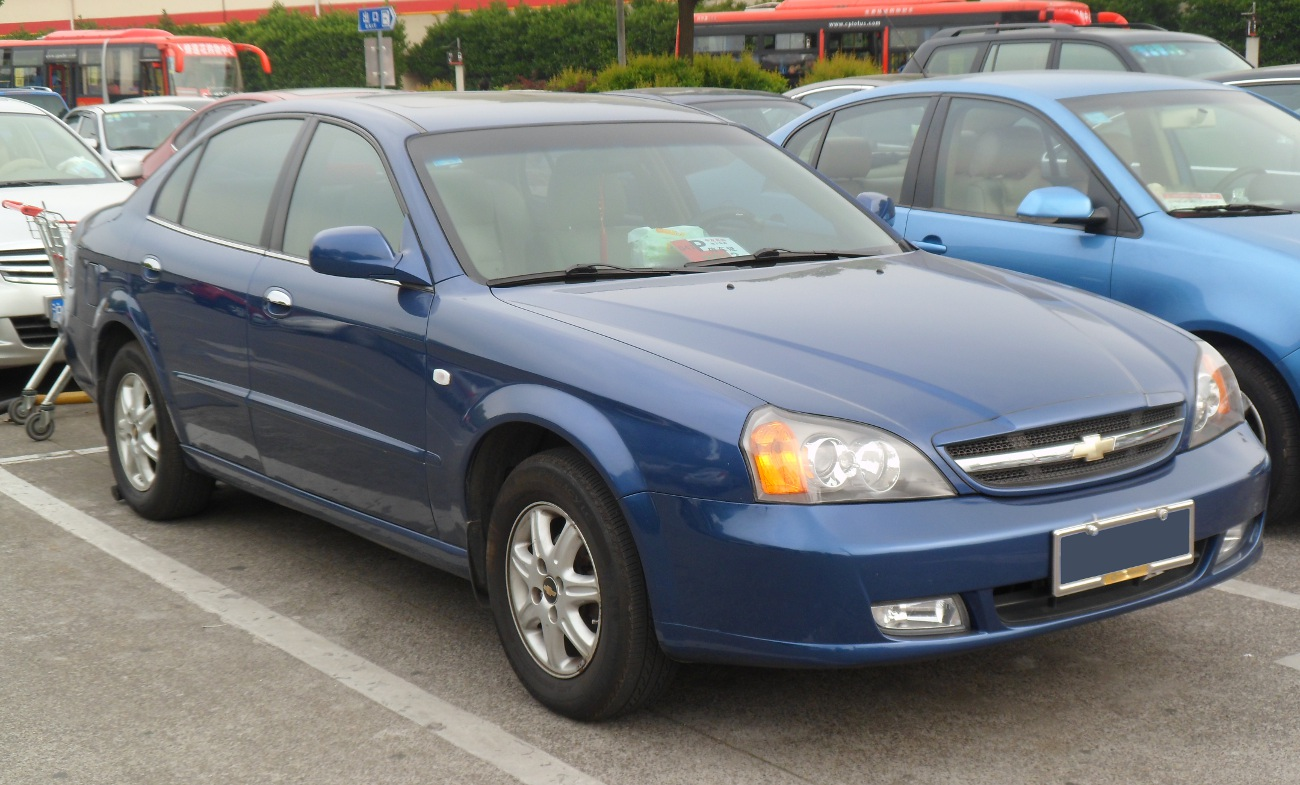
Chevrolet Epica V200

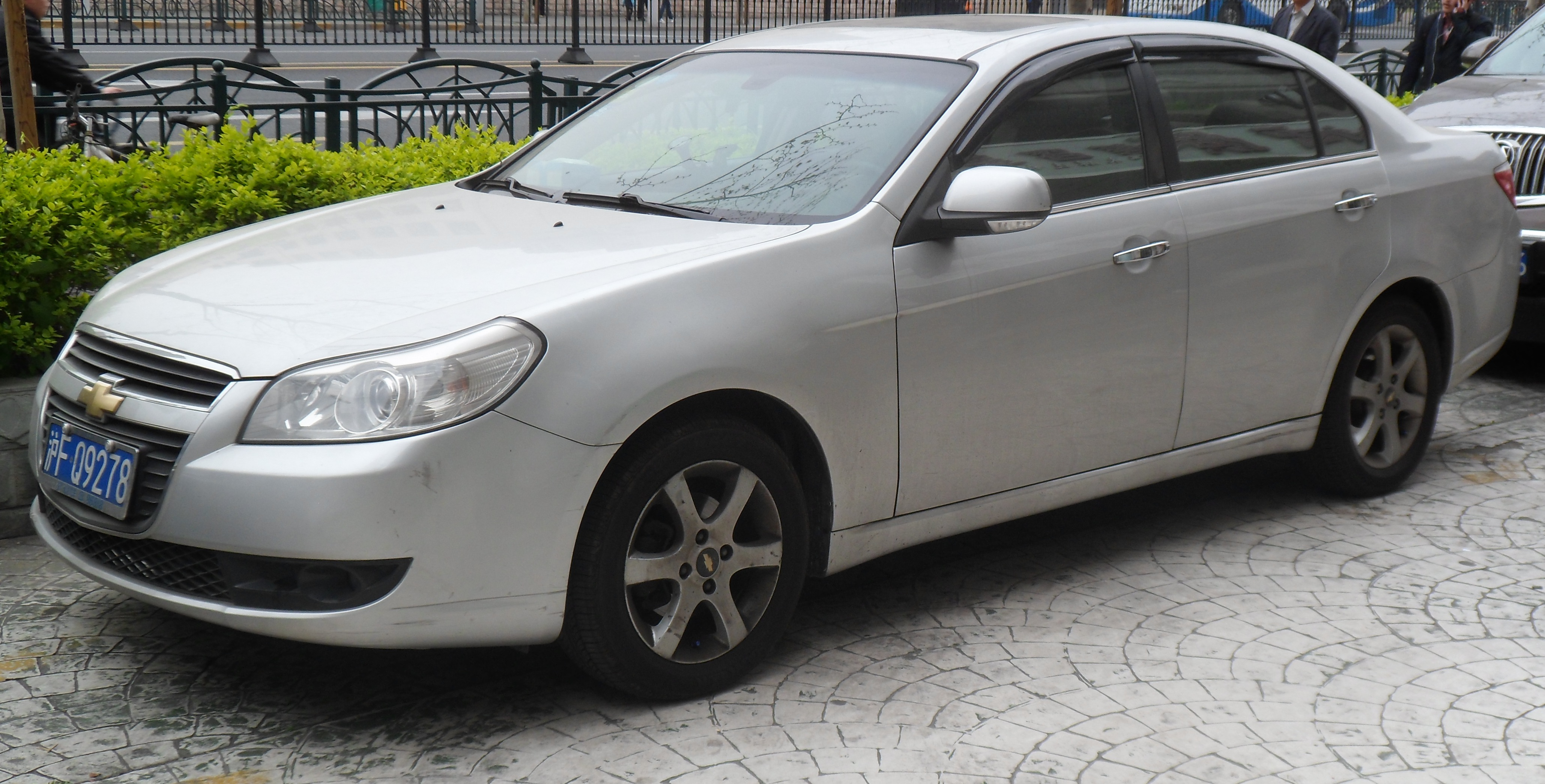
Chevrolet Epica V250

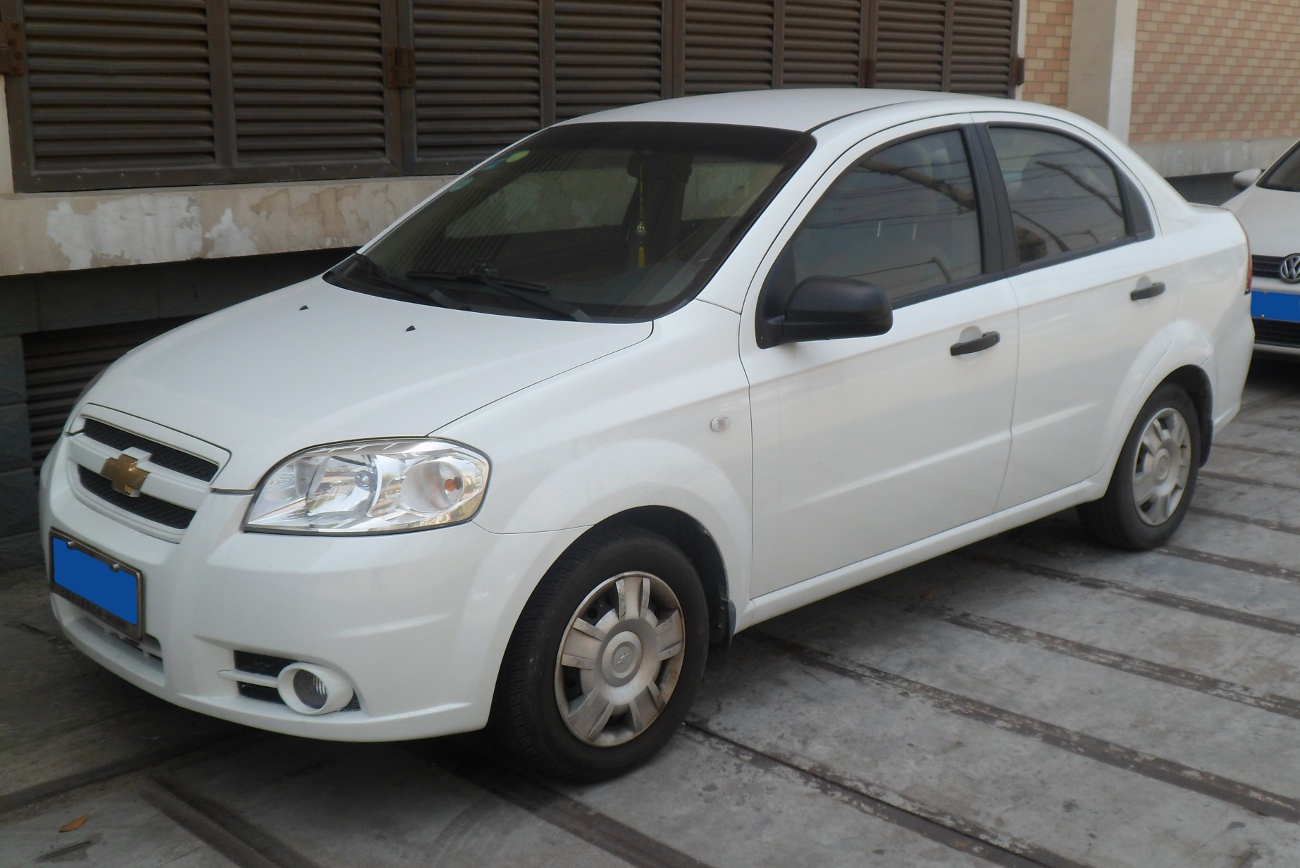
Chevrolet Lova

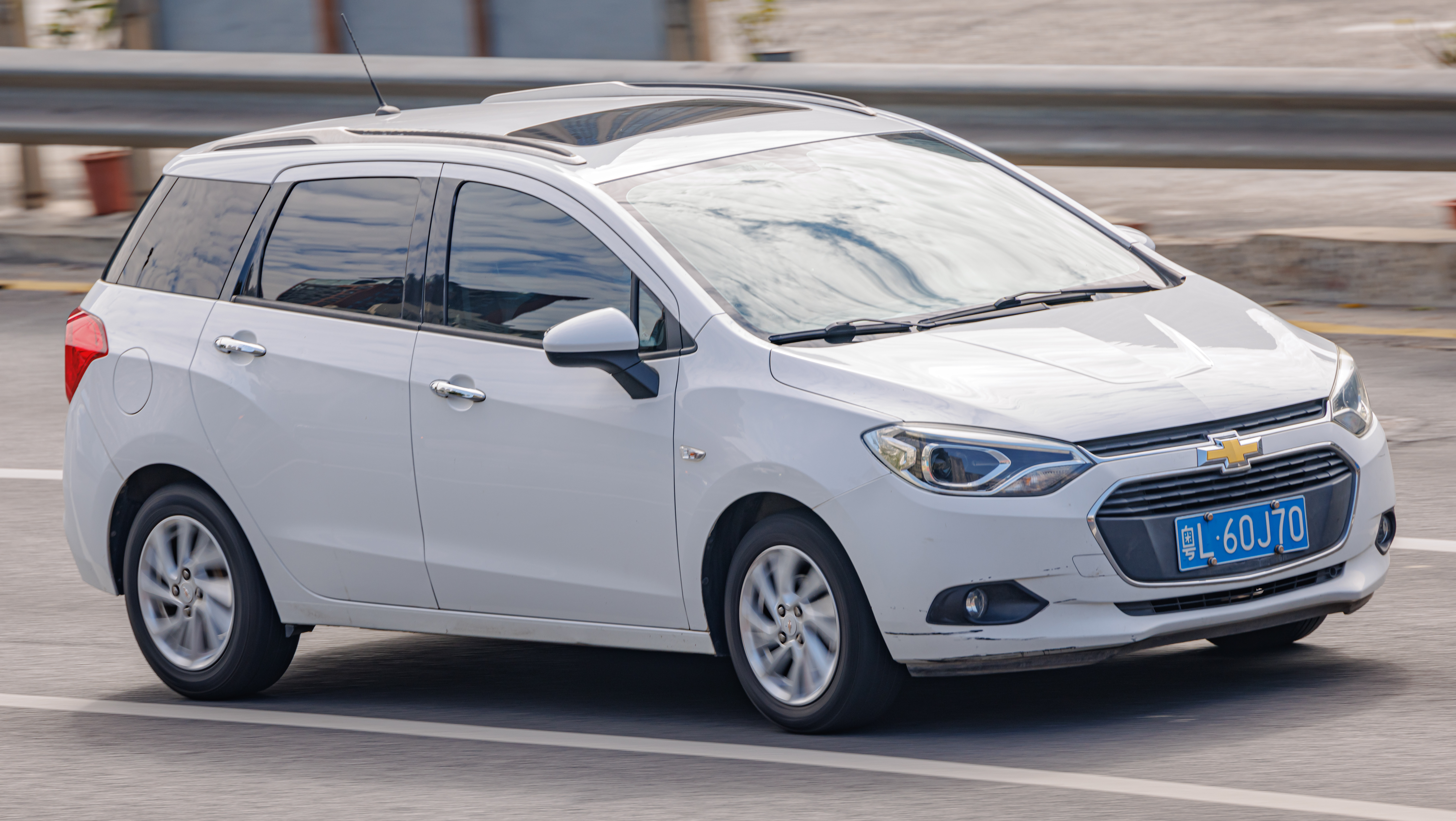
Chevrolet Lova RV

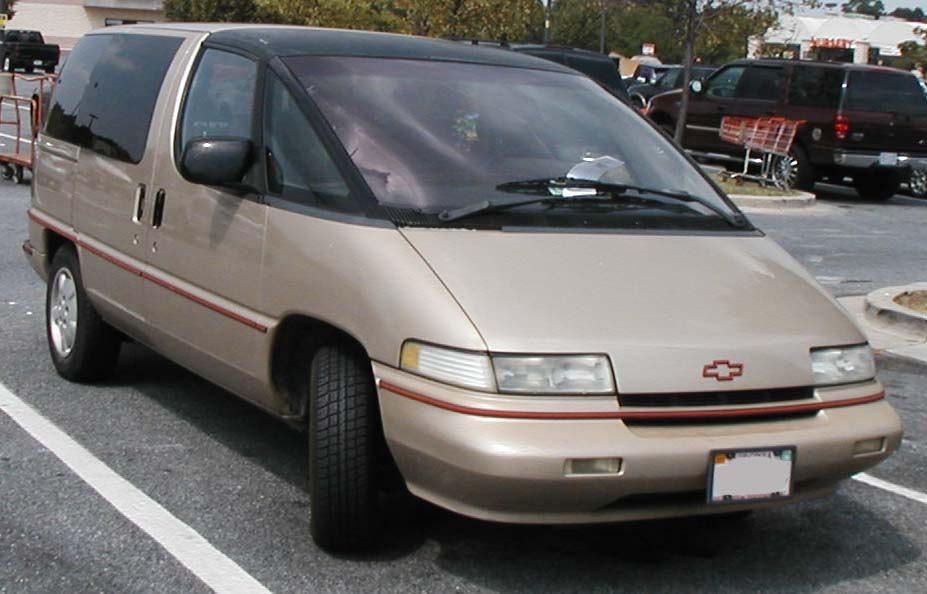
Chevrolet Lumina APV

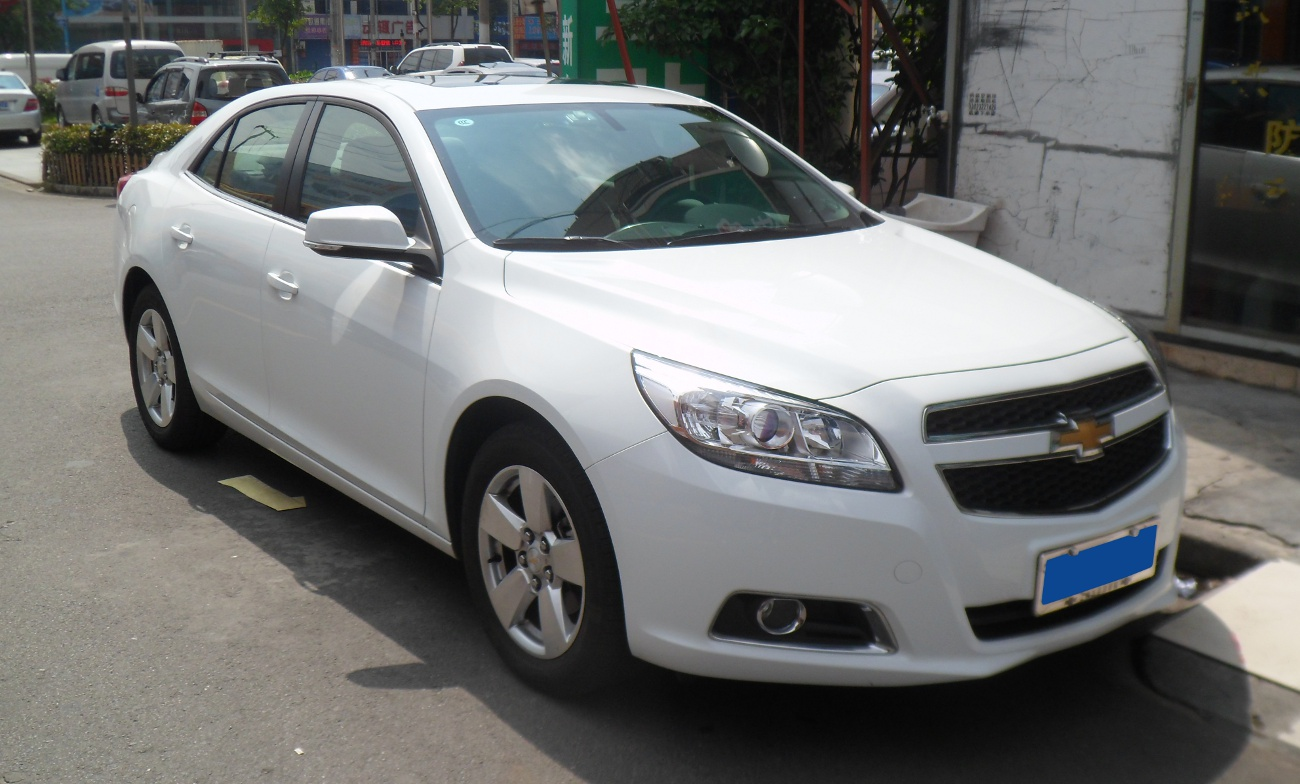
Chevrolet Malibu pre-facelift

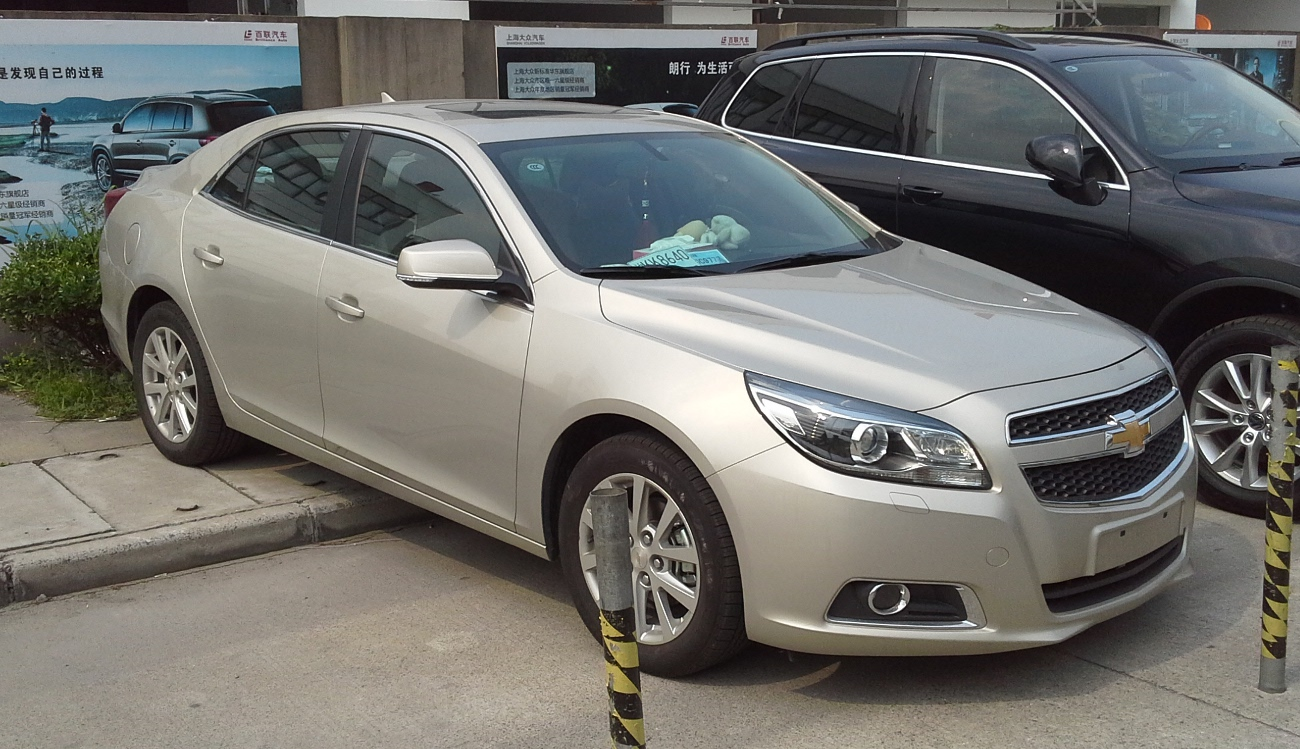
Chevrolet Malibu first facelift

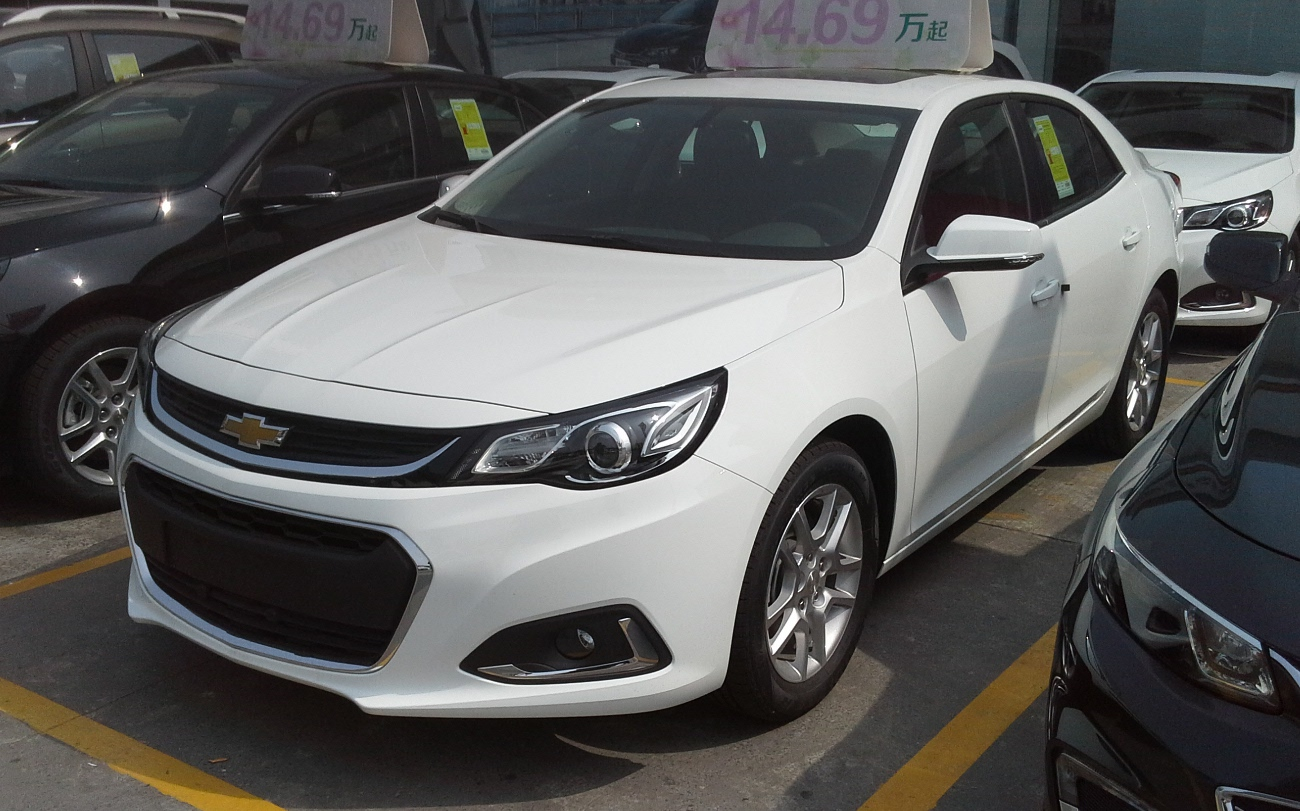
Chevrolet Malibu second facelift

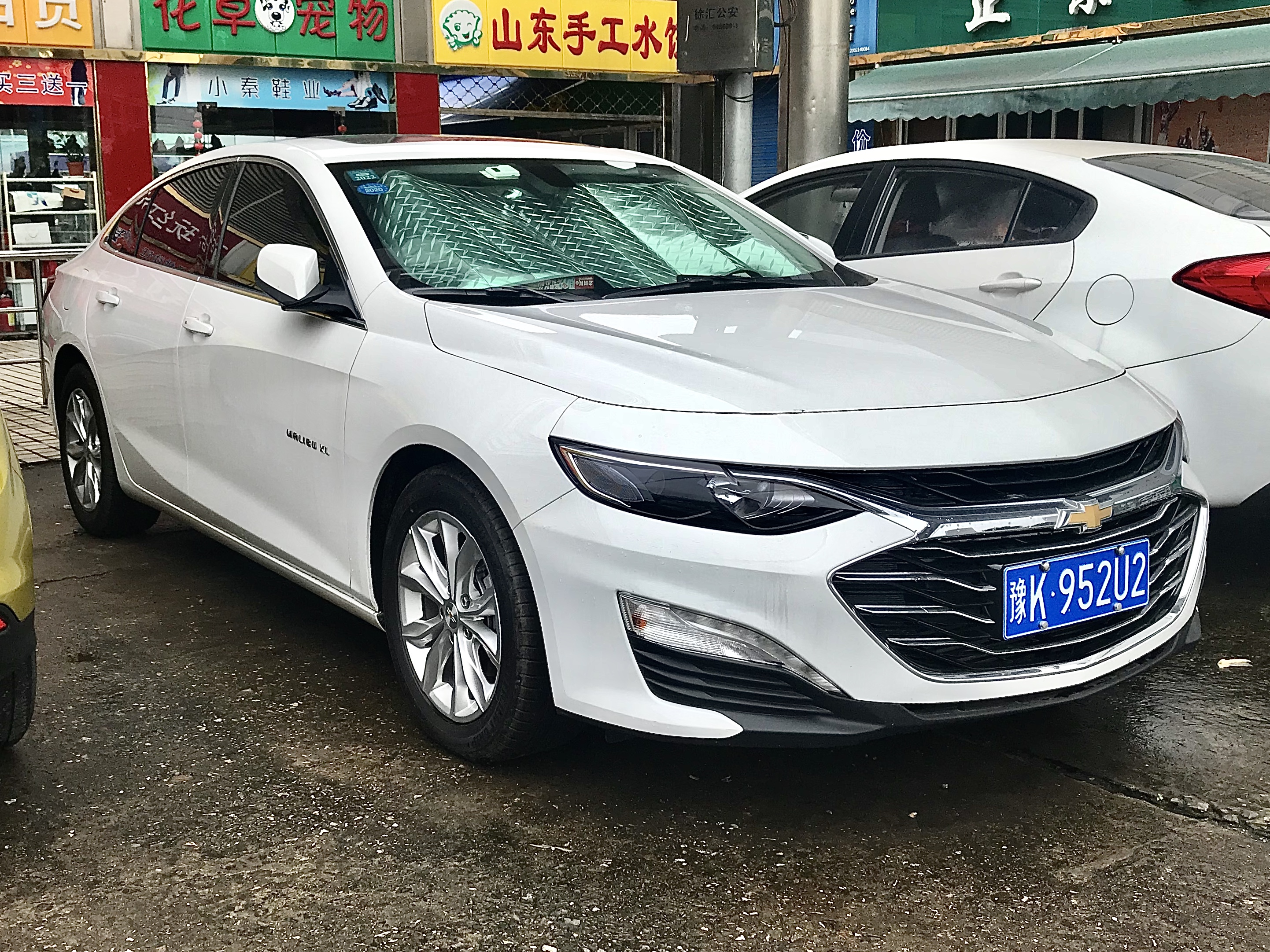
Chevrolet Malibu XL

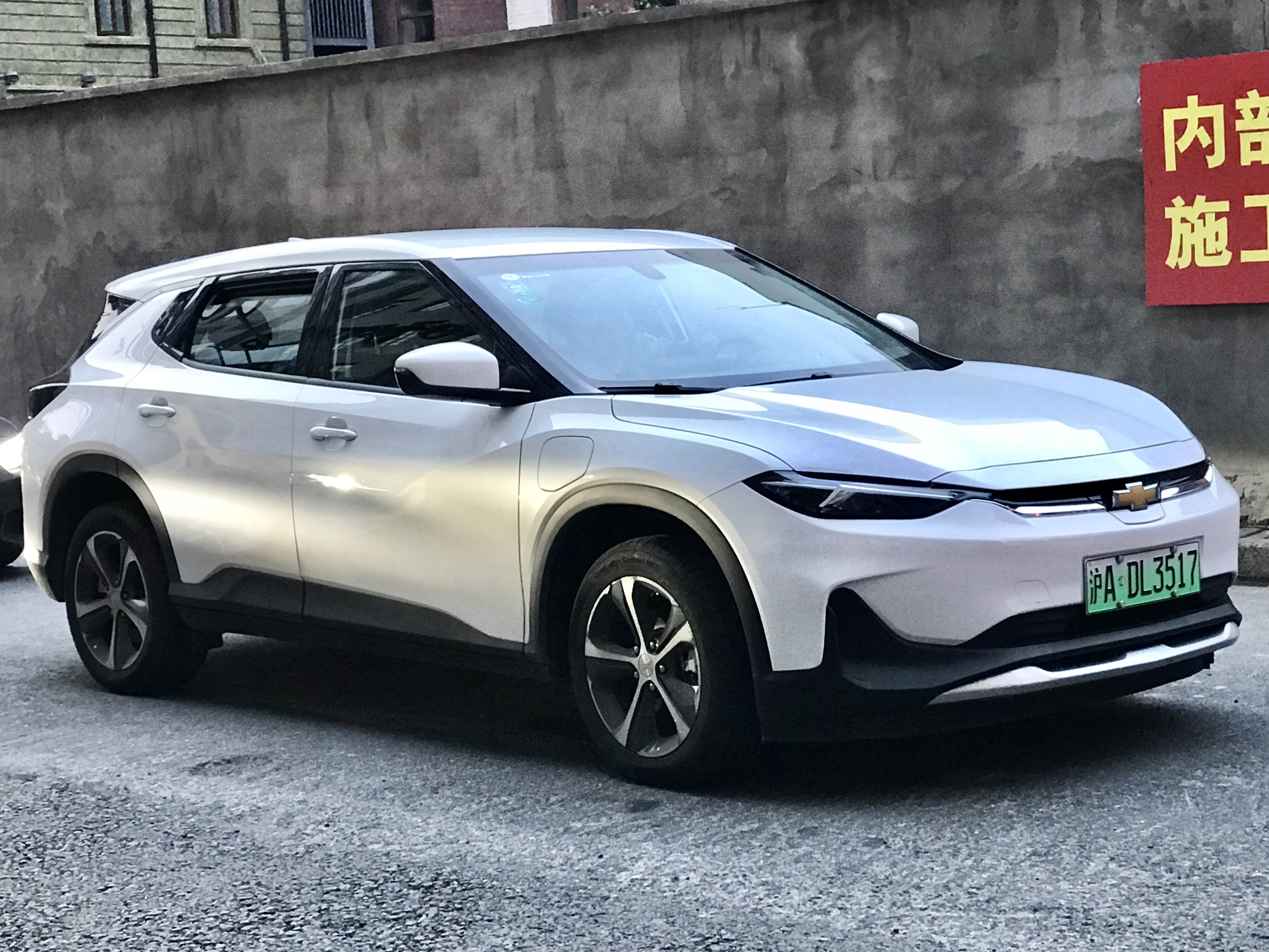
Chevrolet Menlo EV

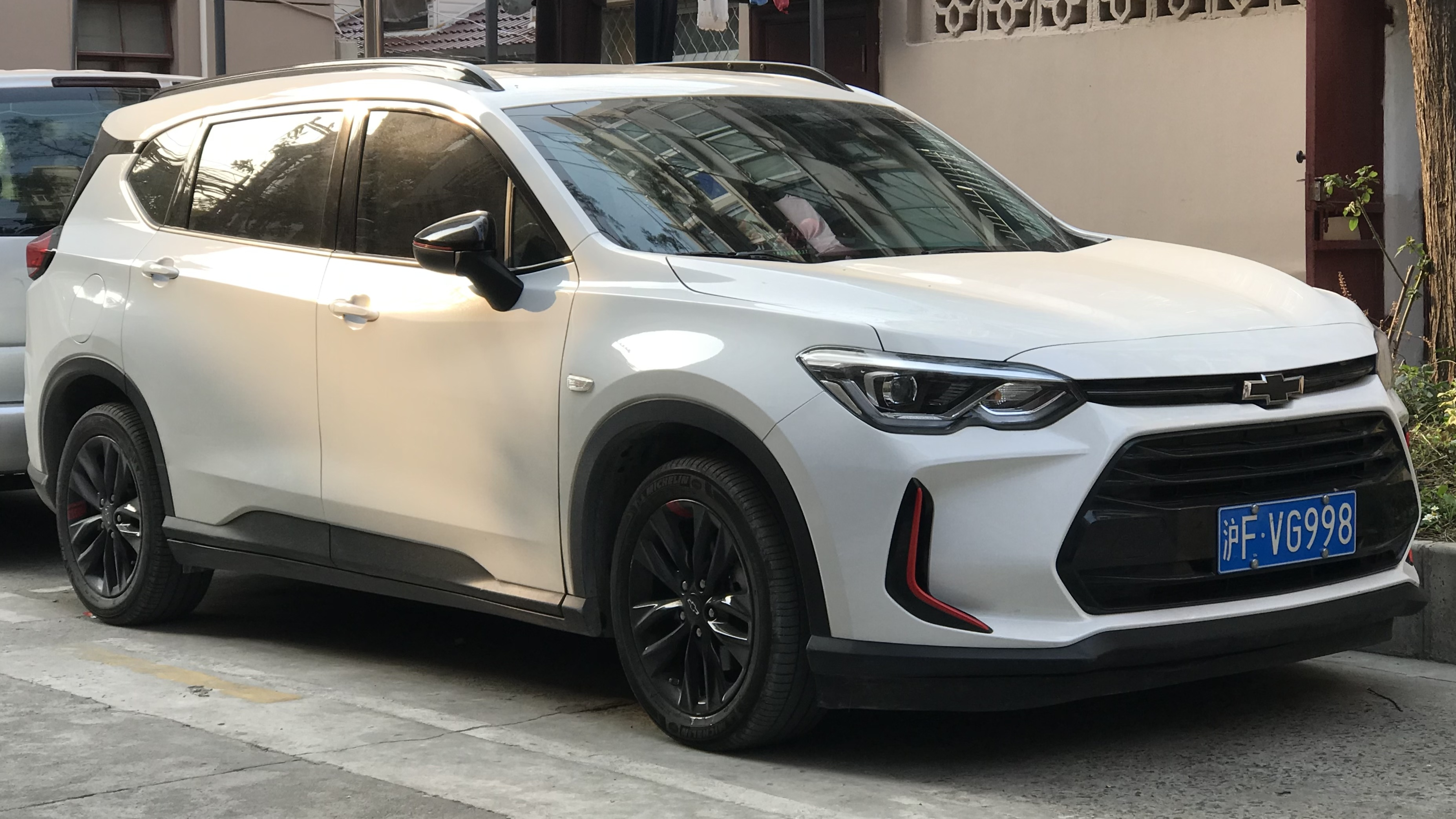
Chevrolet Orlando

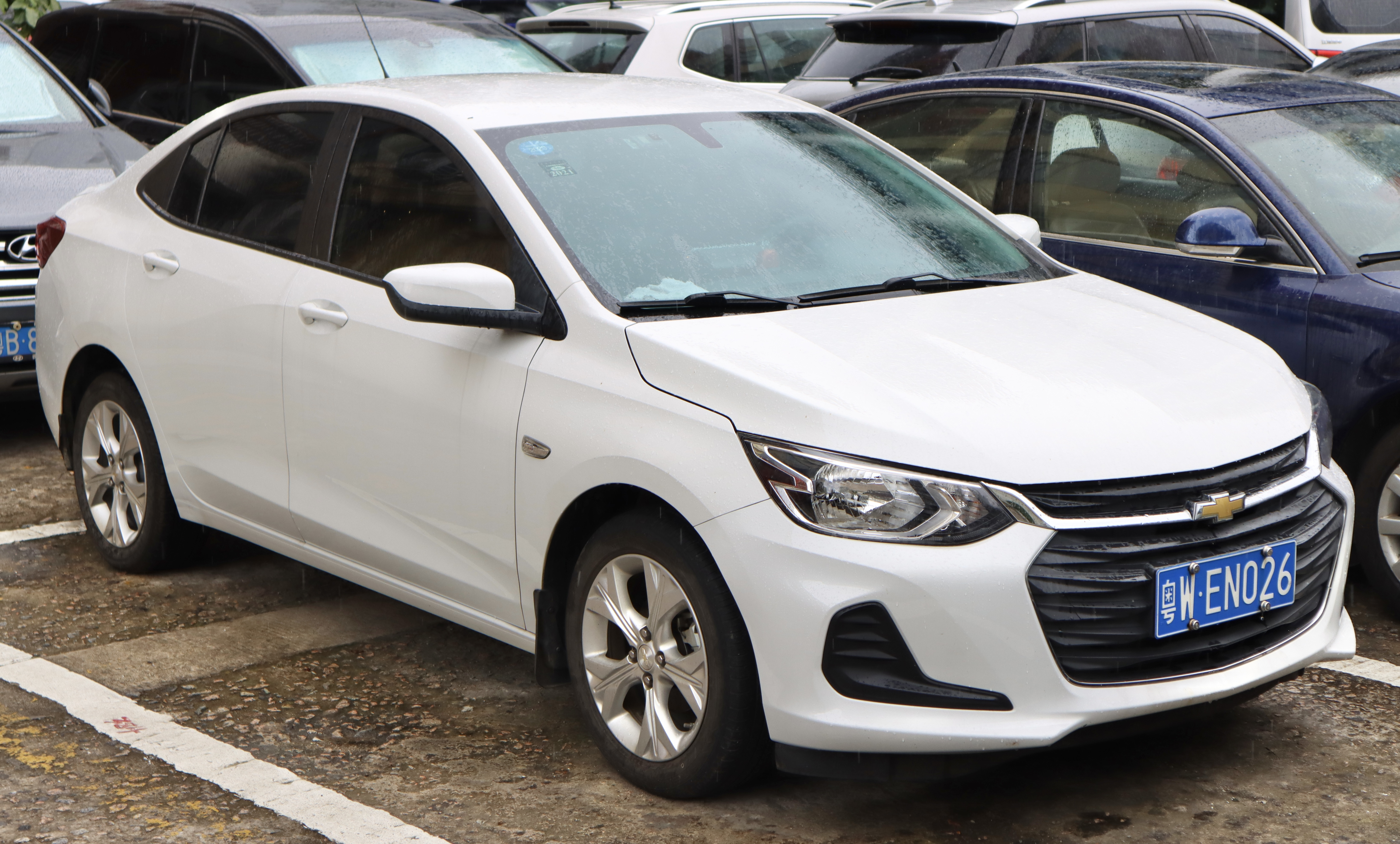
Chevrolet Onix

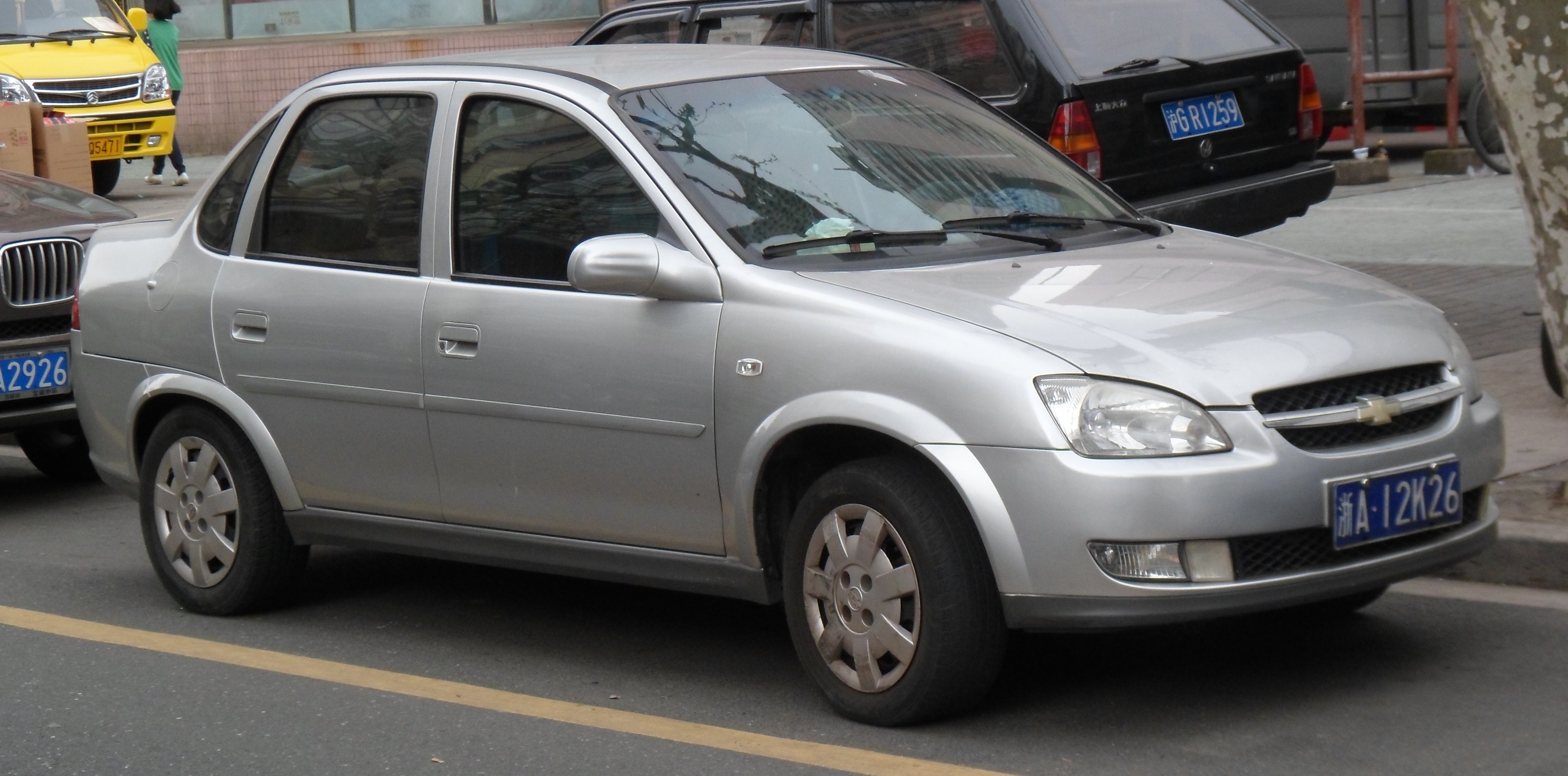
Chevrolet Sail I

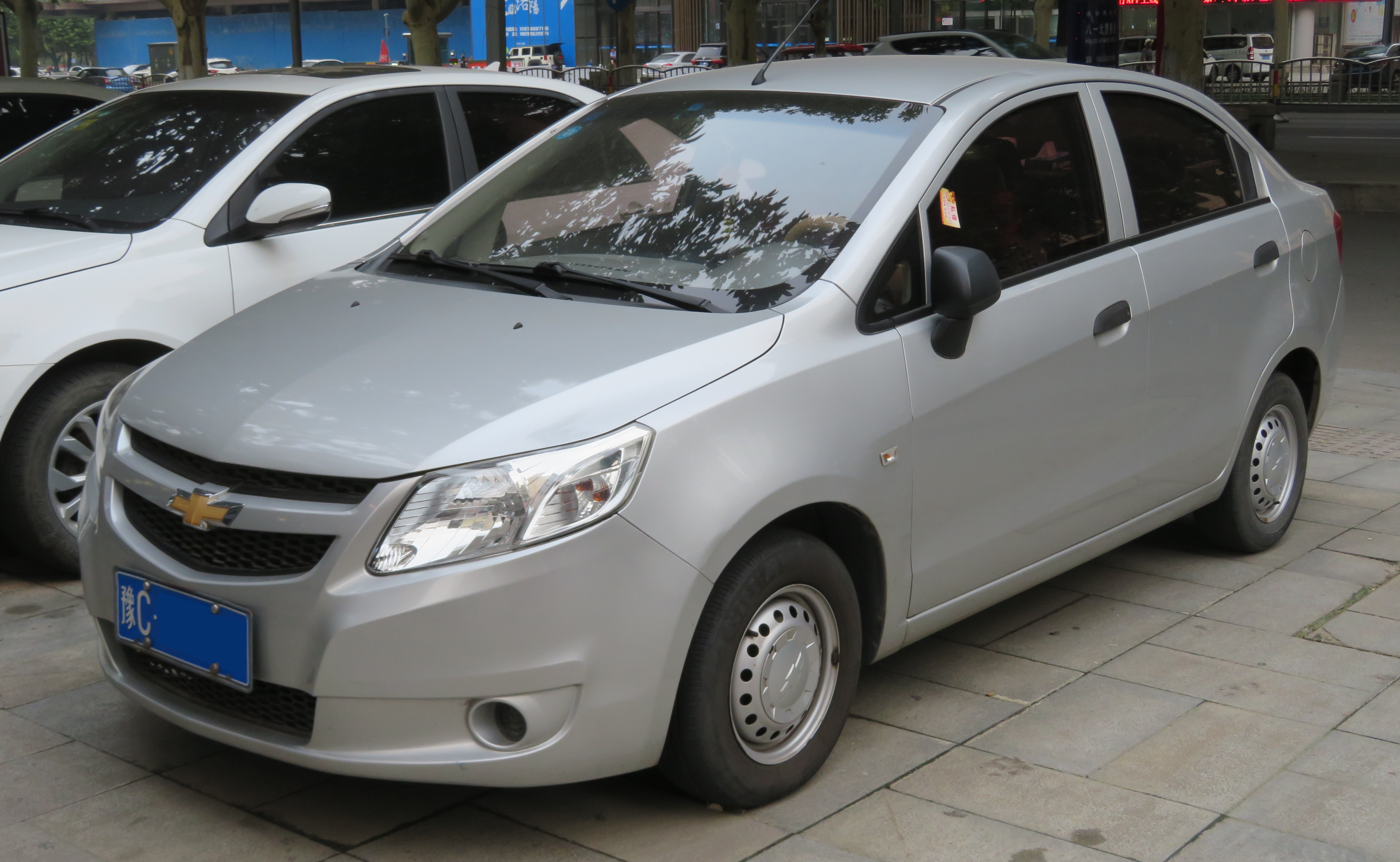
Chevrolet Sail II

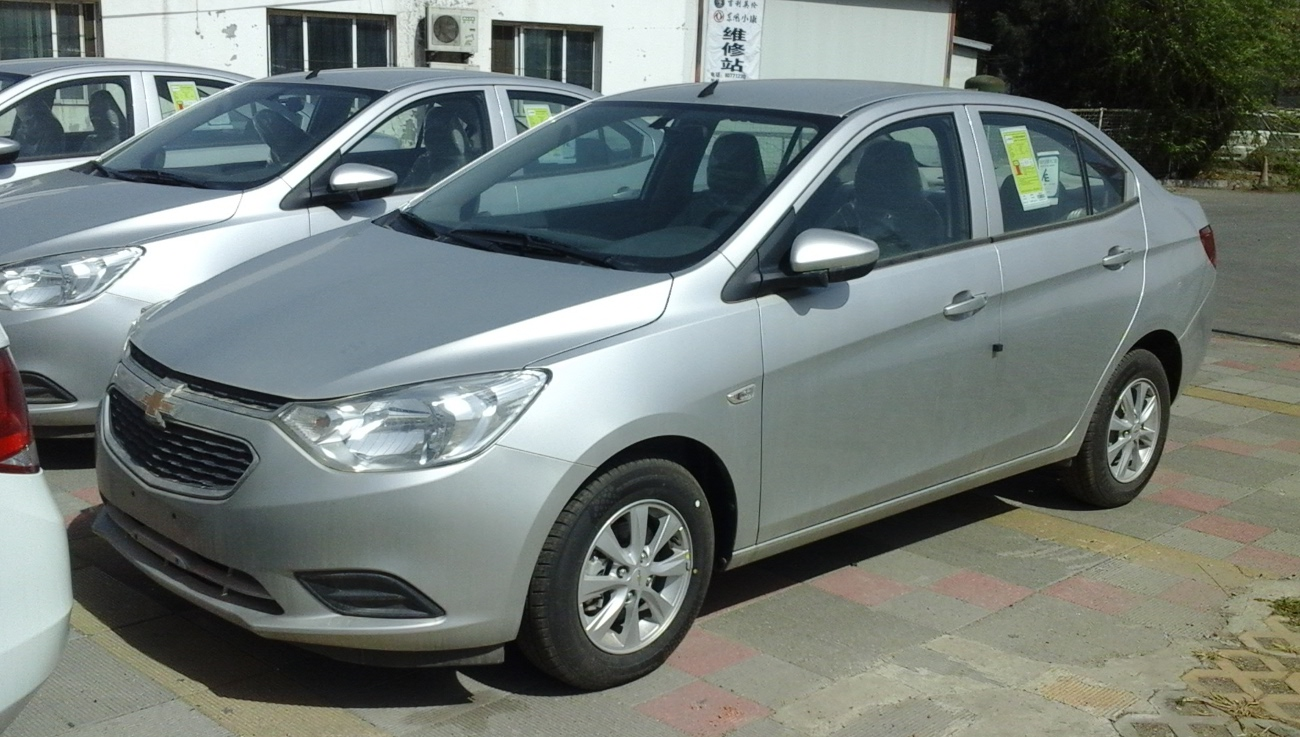
Chevrolet Sail III

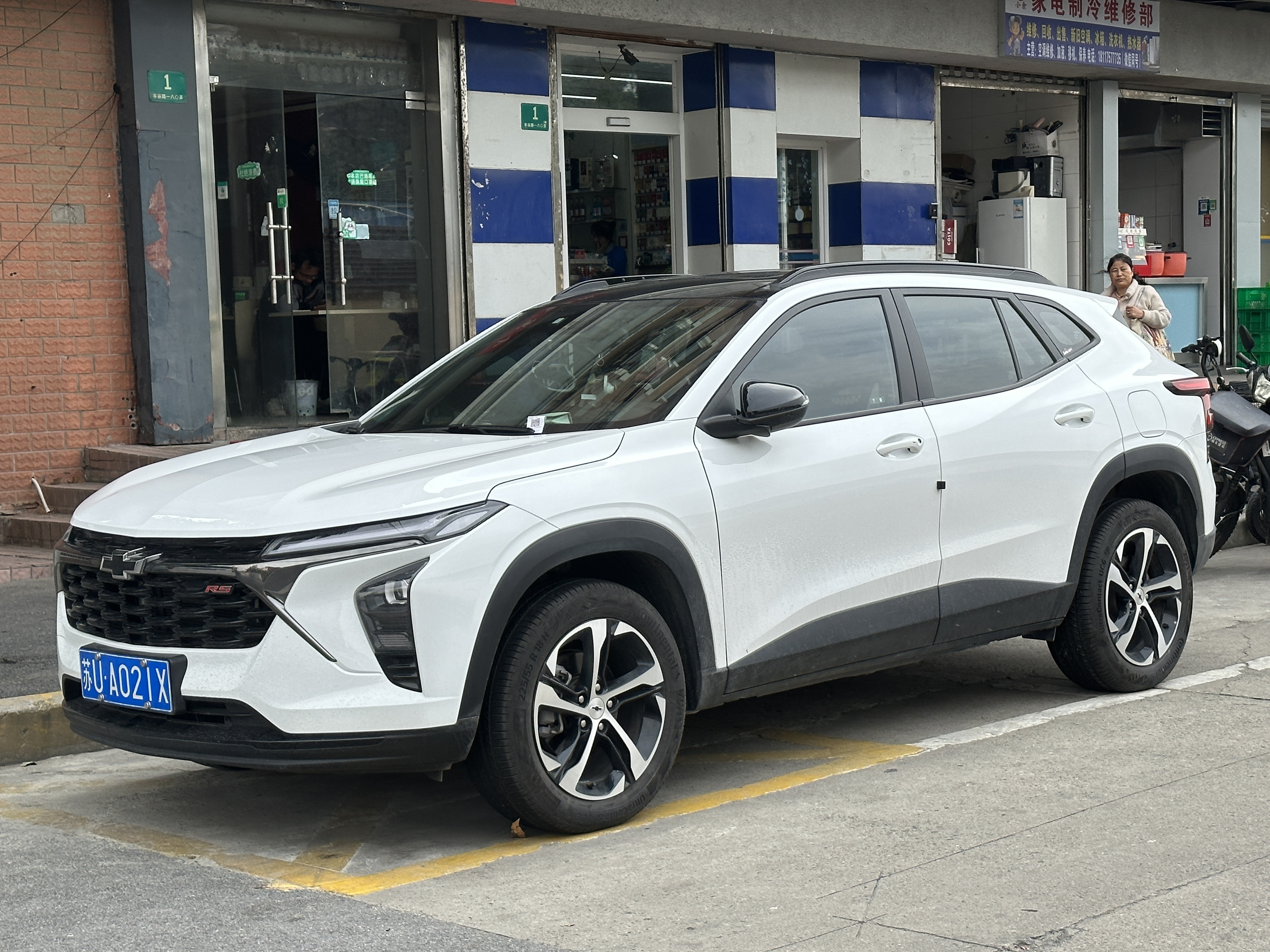
Chevrolet Seeker

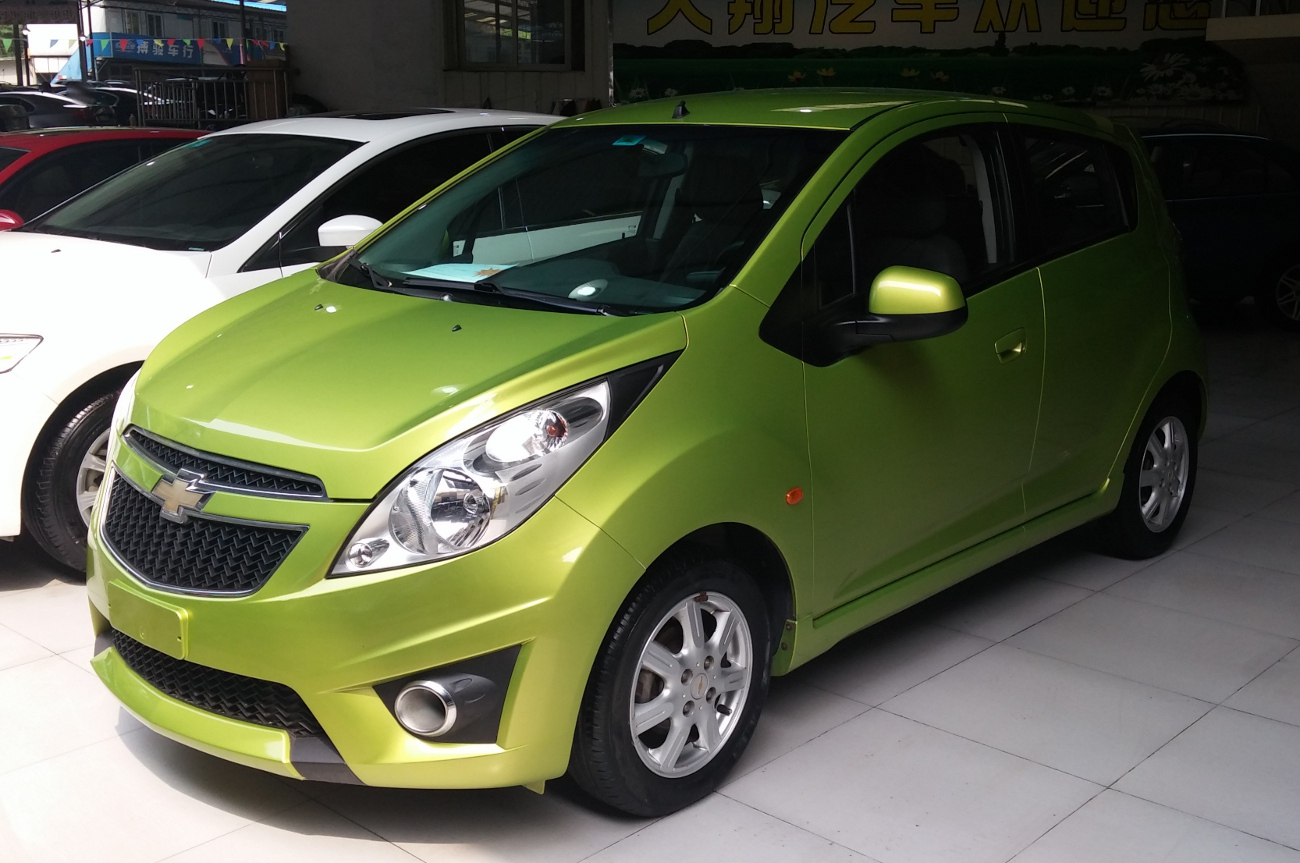
Chevrolet Spark

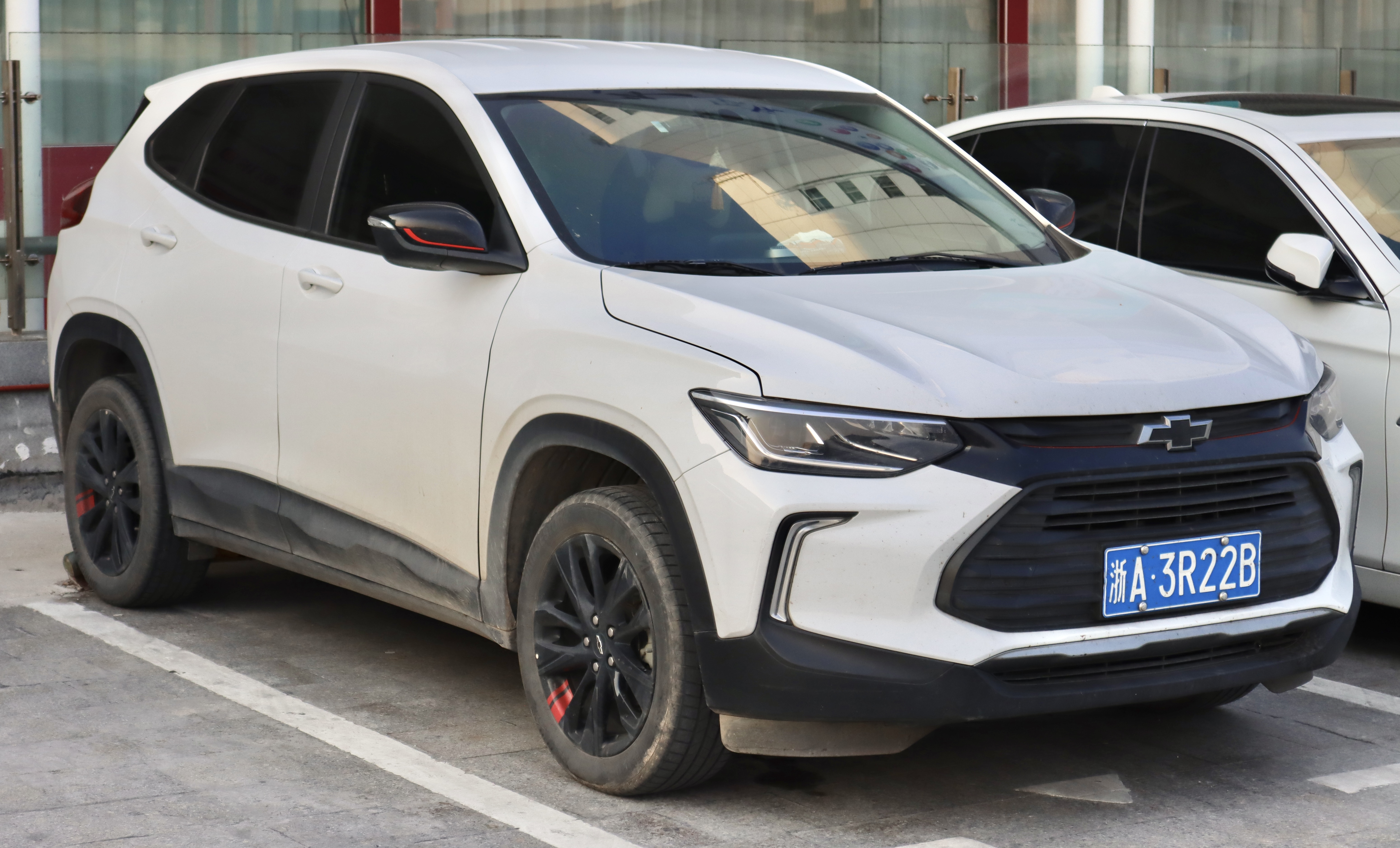
Chevrolet Tracker

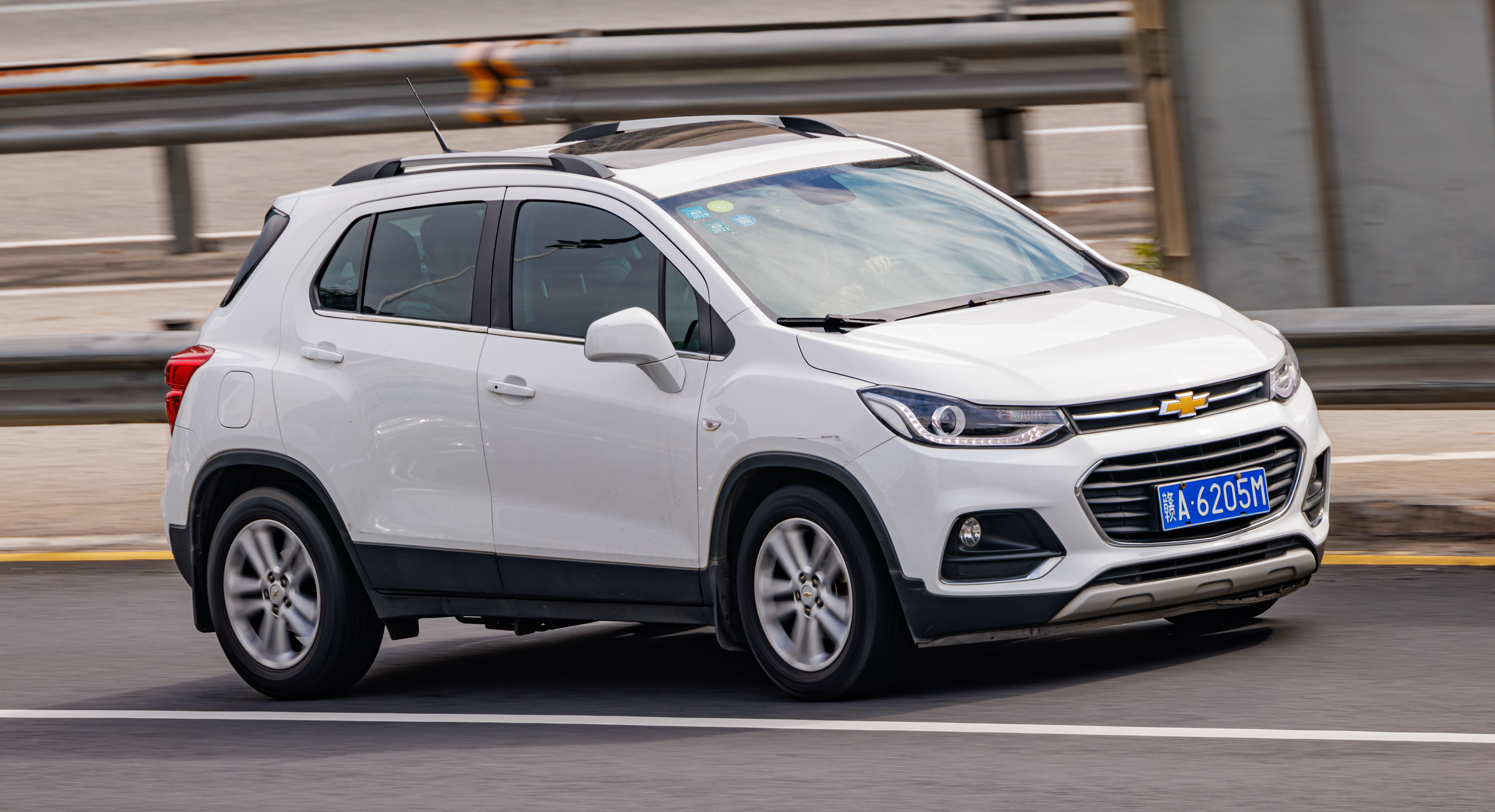
Chevrolet Trax (facelift)

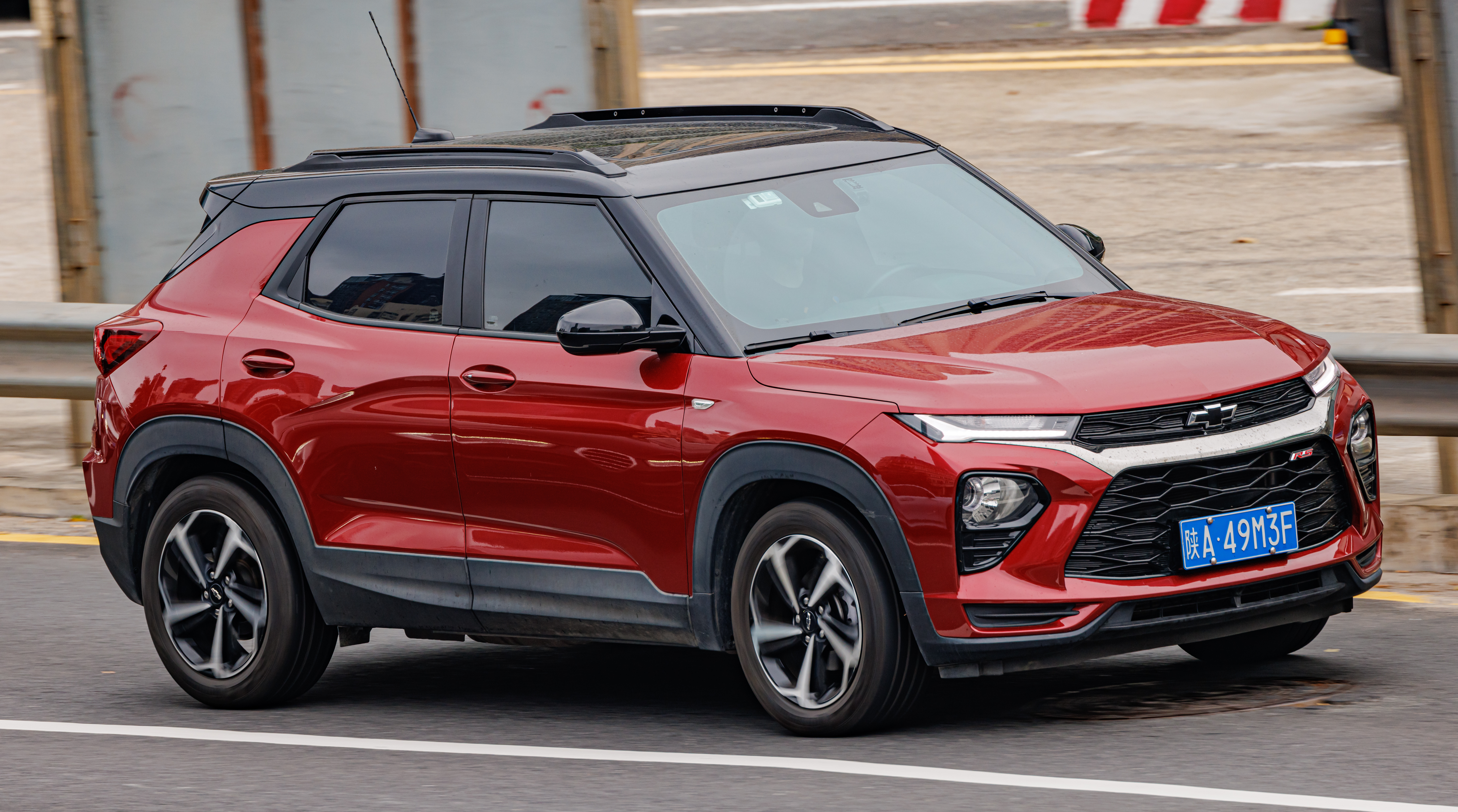
Chevrolet TrailBlazer

== Sales ==
Calendar year	Total sales	Ref.
1999	19,790	
2000	30,543	
2001	58,328	
2002	110,763	
2003	201,188	
2004	252,869	
2005	325,000	
2006	413,367	
2007	500,308	
2008	458,642	
2009	727,631	
2010	1,038,988	
2011	1,231,539	
2012	1,392,658	
2013	1,575,167	
2014	1,760,158	
2015	1,752,015	
2016	1,887,071	
2017	2,000,187	
2018	1,970,117	
2019	1,600,102	
2020	1,467,470	
2021	1,331,567	
2022	1,170,107	
2023	1,001,017	
2024	673,007	
2025	562,185	

== See also ==
- SAIC-GM-Wuling
