= Chevrolet Monza (China) =

Compact sedan

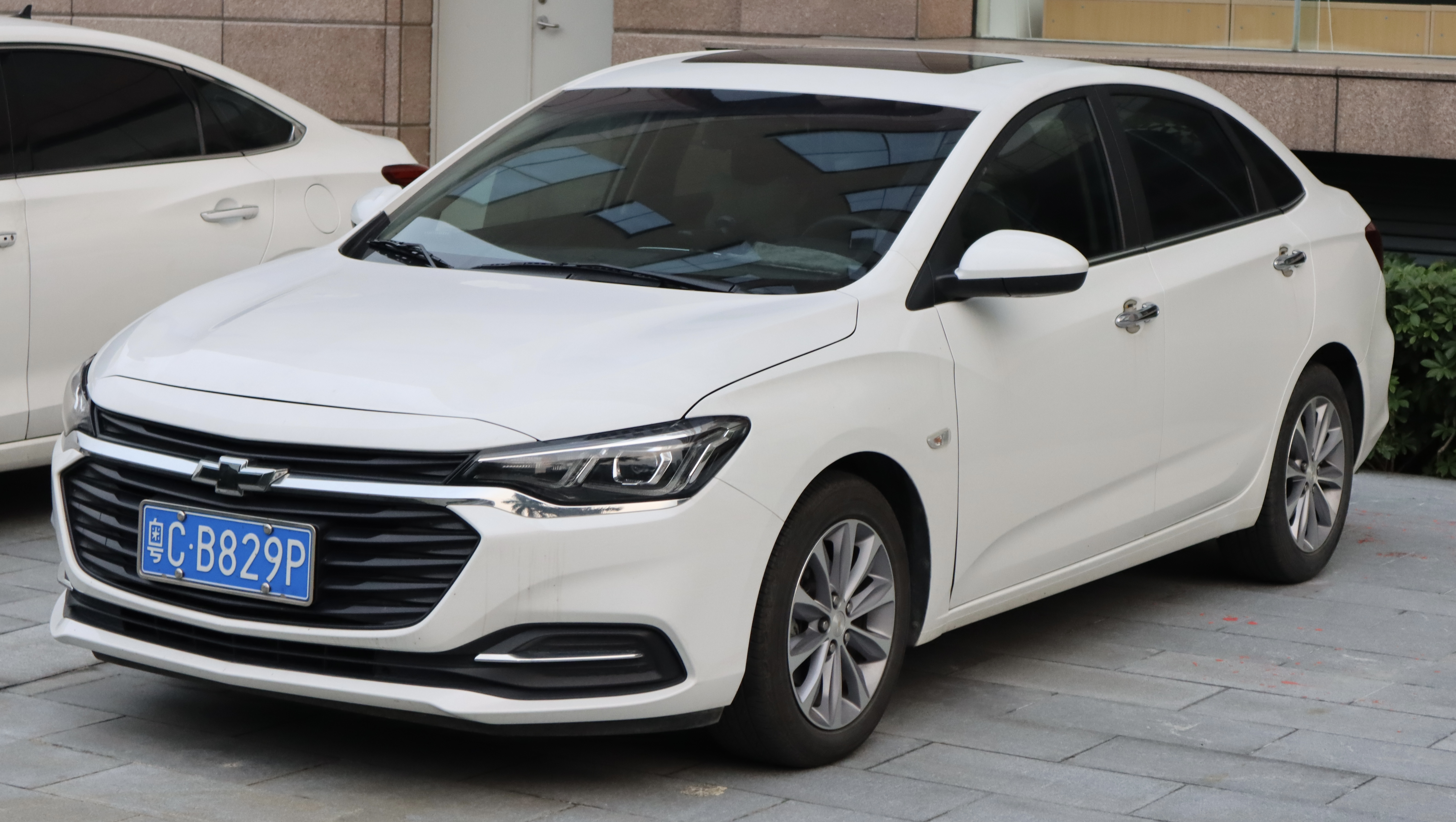

Overview
- Manufacturer: SAIC-GM
- Also called: Chevrolet Cavalier (Mexico; pre-facelift); Chevrolet Cruze (Middle East; facelift)
- Production: 2019–present
- Assembly: China: Wuhan (SAIC-GM)
- Designer: Xiaochuan Zeng (PATAC)

Body and chassis
- Class: Compact car
- Body style: 4-door sedan
- Layout: Front-engine, front-wheel-drive
- Platform: GM-PATAC K
- Related: Buick Excelle GT

Powertrain
- Engine: Petrol: 1.0 L EcoTec Turbo I3; 1.3 L EcoTec Turbo I3; 1.5 L L3A I4
- Transmission: 6-speed manual; 6-speed automatic; 6-speed DCT

Dimensions
- Wheelbase: 2,640 mm (103.9 in)
- Length: 4,614 mm (181.7 in) (320T); 4,630 mm (182.3 in) (330T); 4,656 mm (183.3 in) (2023 facelift)
- Width: 1,798 mm (70.8 in)
- Height: 1,485 mm (58.5 in); 1,465 mm (57.7 in) (2023 facelift)
- Curb weight: 1,225–1,265 kg (2,701–2,789 lb); 1,260 kg (2,778 lb) (2023 facelift)

Chronology
- Predecessor: Chevrolet Cavalier; Chevrolet Cruze

The Chevrolet Monza (Chinese: 科鲁泽; pinyin: kēlǔzé) is a compact sedan produced by General Motors through its SAIC-GM joint venture under the Chevrolet brand. Prior to the introduction of the vehicle, the Monza nameplate was previously used in the 20th century for related compact models in the North and South American markets. It is the successor of the fourth generation Chevrolet Cavalier previously sold under the 科沃兹 kewozi nameplate, which is now used for the Chevrolet Onix positioned below the Monza.

== History ==
The Monza debuted in November 2018 at the Guangzhou Auto Show. Since 21 March 2019, it is sold in China. It is built on the GM-PATAC K platform shared with the Buick Excelle GT and the Buick GL6 use.

Starting in late 2021, the Monza was exported to Mexico as the Cavalier Turbo. It was positioned above the Onix and replaced the previous generation Cavalier. It was available in three trim levels; LS, LT, and RS. The Cavalier was discontinued in July 2025, leaving the Aveo and Onix as the only Chevrolet passenger cars sold in Mexico.

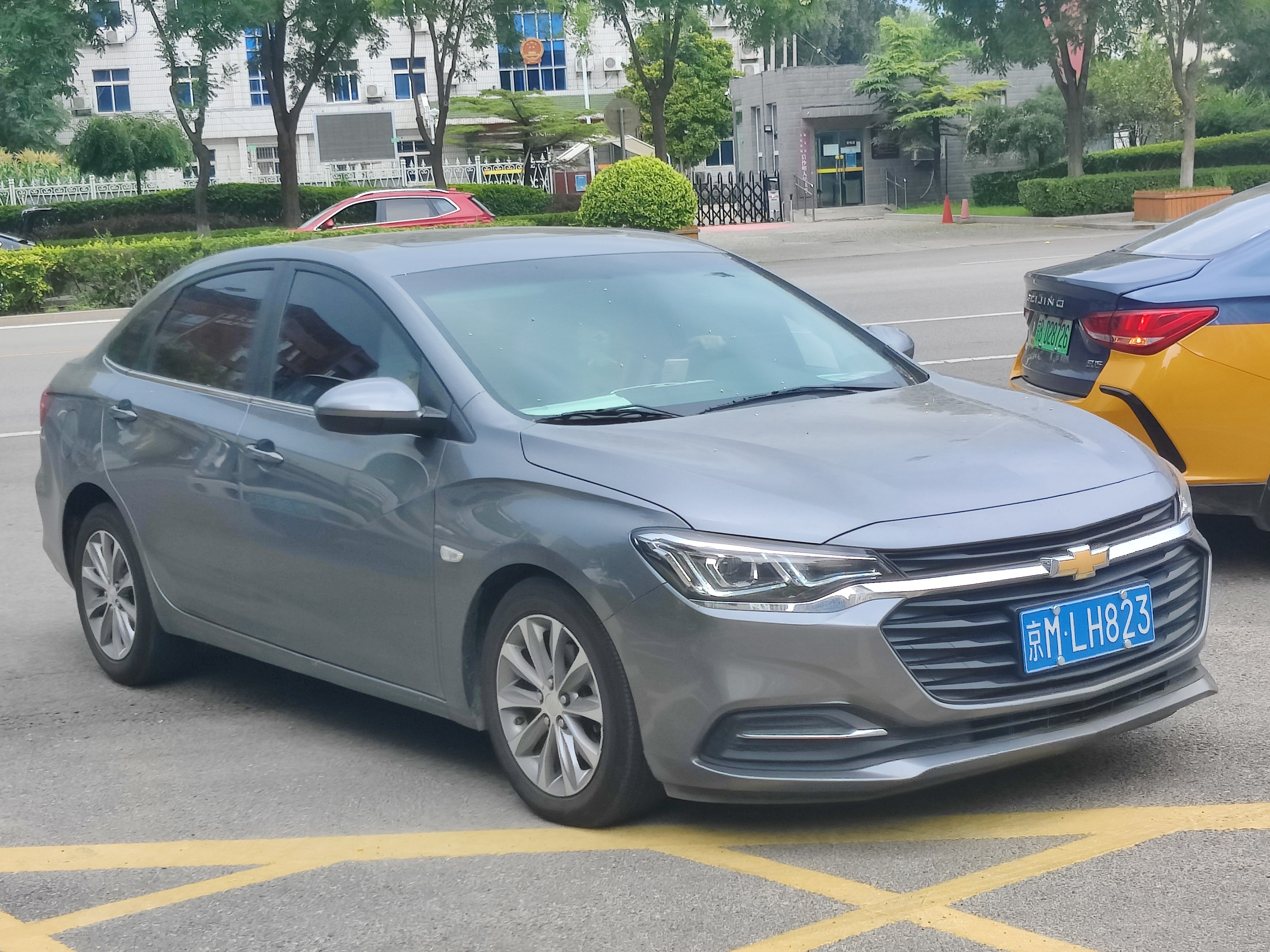
Chevrolet Monza

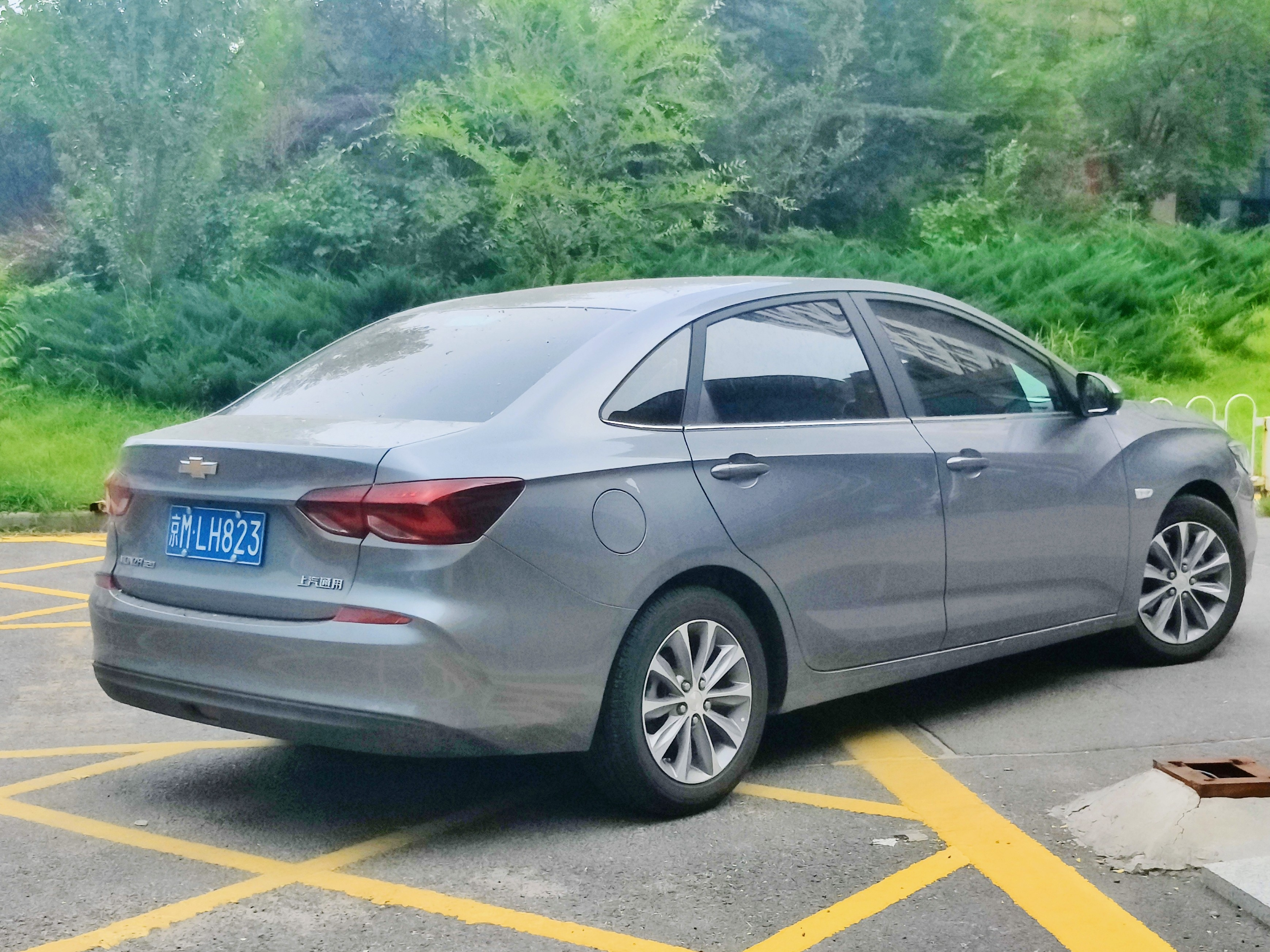
Chevrolet Monza rear

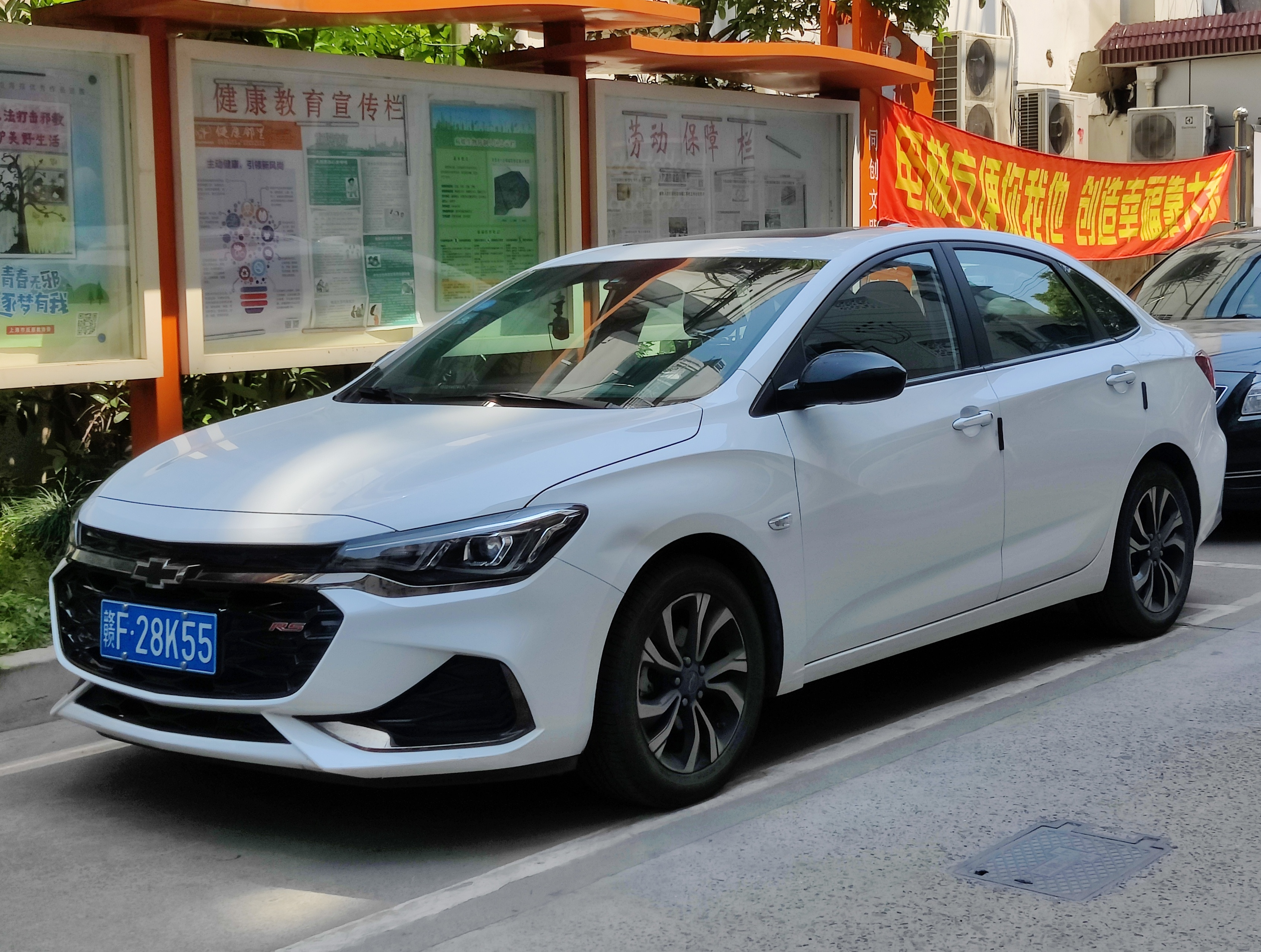
Chevrolet Monza RS

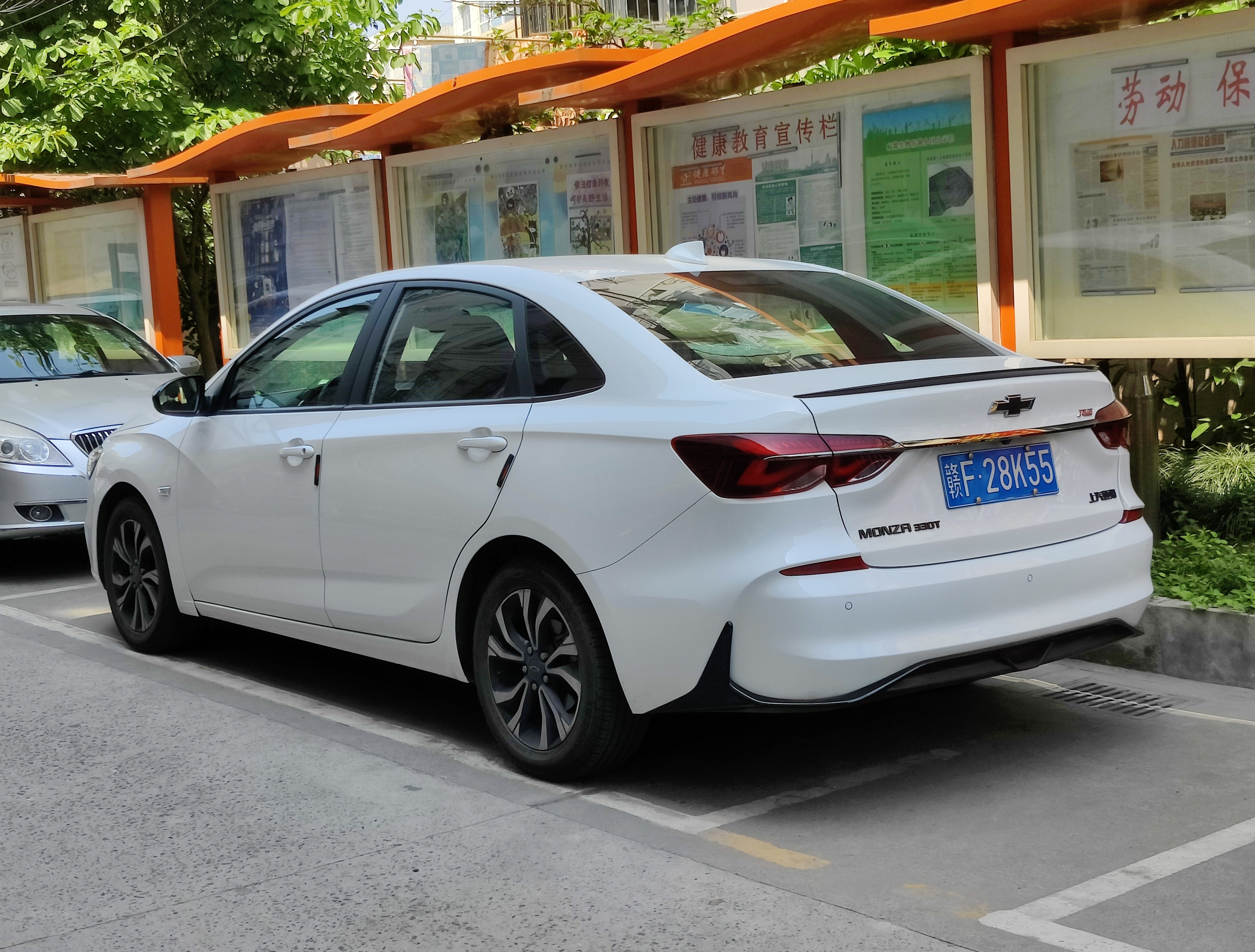
Chevrolet Monza RS rear

=== 2023 facelift ===
The model was restyled for the 2023 model year in China, undergoing an update facelift also adding a mild-hybrid version.

In July 2025, the facelifted Monza was announced for the Middle East market (excluding the United Arab Emirates) as the 2026 Chevrolet Cruze, with launches beginning in the following months.

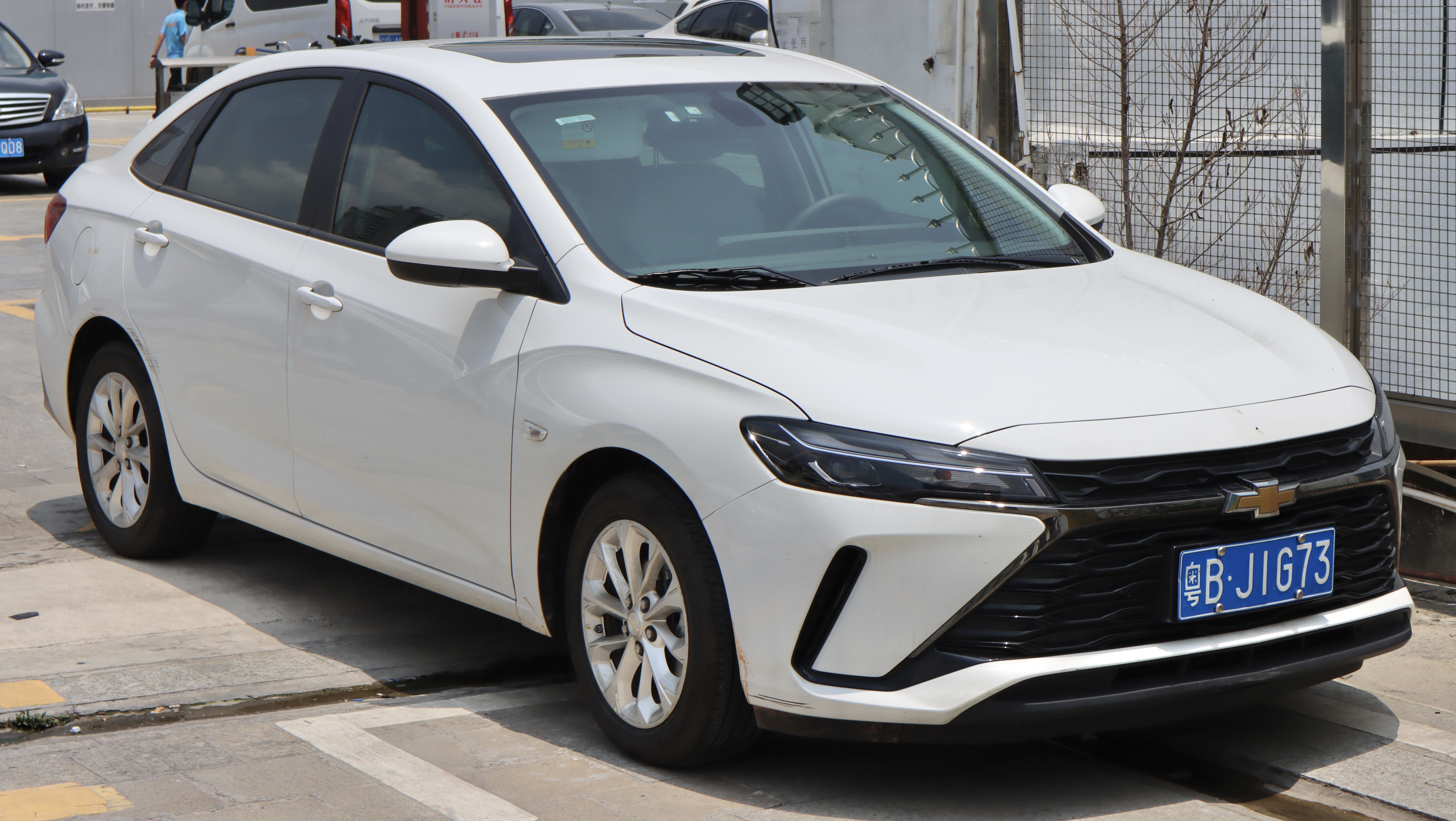
Chevrolet Monza 2023 facelift

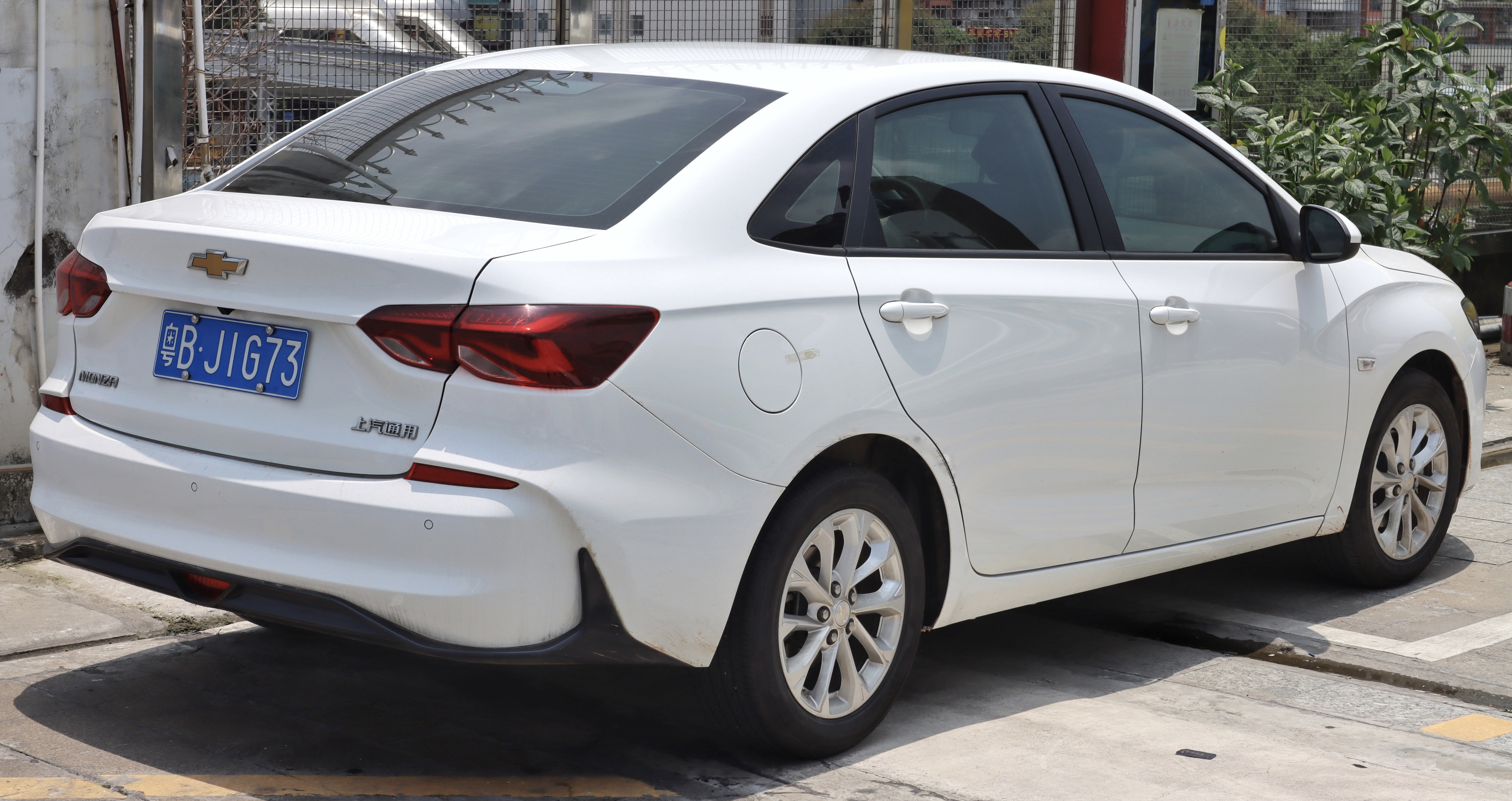
Chevrolet Monza 2023 facelift

== Specifications ==
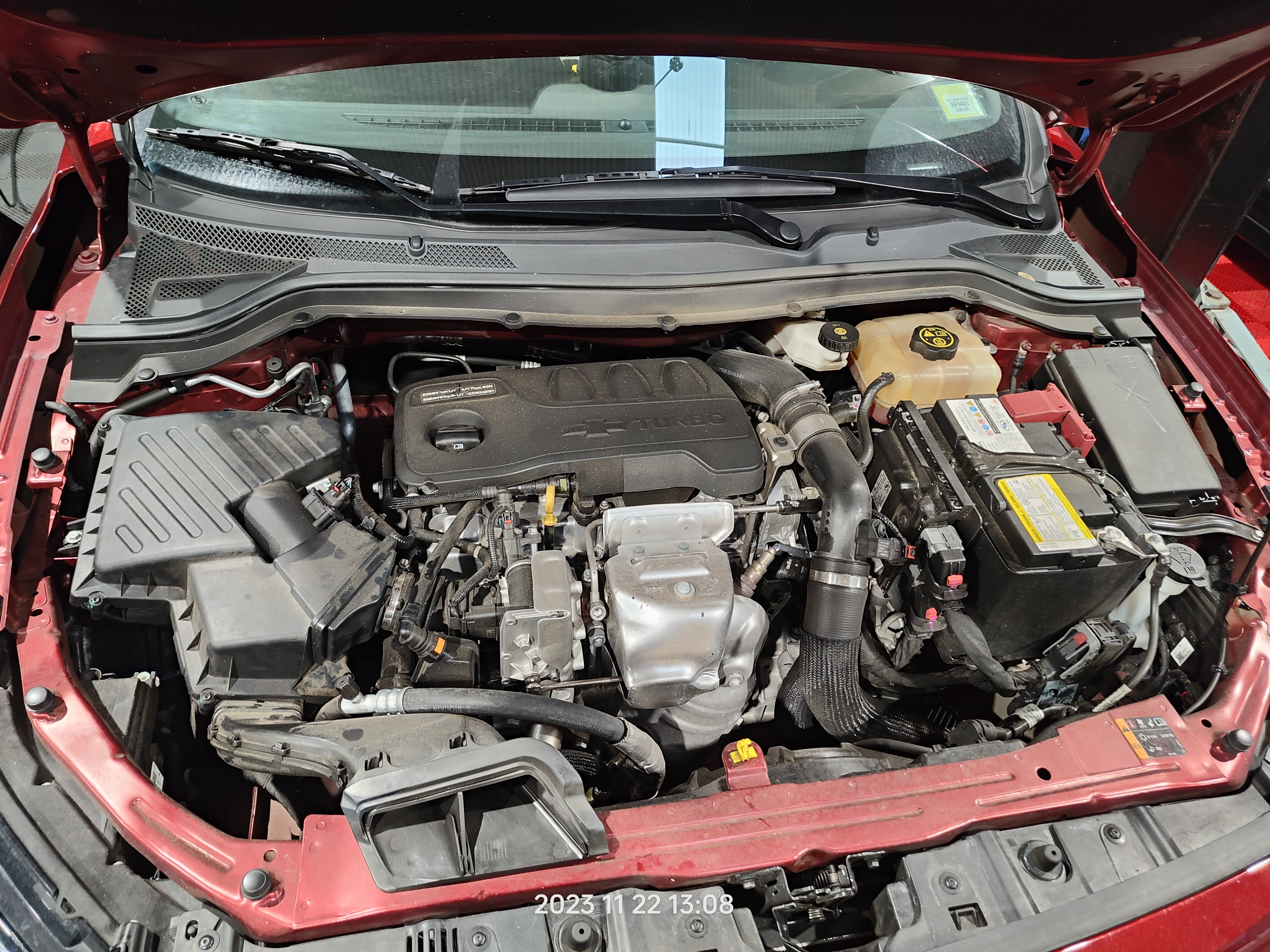
Chevrolet Monza Engine

The Monza was initially available in two trim levels (the 320T and the 330T) and in five models overall. The 320T is available with a 1.0-litre turbocharged three-cylinder engine paired with either a 6-speed manual or a 6-speed dual-clutch gearbox. The 330T gets a 1.3-litre turbocharged three-cylinder engine which is only available with a 6-speed automatic gearbox. Later, the 320 trim level was added featuring a 1.5-litre four-cylinder DVVT engine in the 2021 lineup.

=== Engines ===
Model	Engine	Power	Torque	Fuel economy
320	L2B 1.5L I4 DVVT	83 kW (113 PS) at 6000 rpm	141 N⋅m (104 lb⋅ft) at 4400 rpm	5.9 L/100 km (40 mpg_{‑US})
Redline 320T	LIW 1.0L I3 turbo	92 kW (125 PS) at 5600 rpm	170 N⋅m (125 lb⋅ft) at 2000-4000 rpm	4.7 L/100 km (50 mpg_{‑US})
RS 330T	LIY 1.3L I3 turbo	120 kW (163 PS) at 5500 rpm	230 N⋅m (170 lb⋅ft) at 1800-4400 rpm	5.3 L/100 km (44 mpg_{‑US})

== Sales ==
Year	China
2023	119,640
2024	33,125
2025	6,001
