= Buick Excelle GT =

Compact car produced by SAIC-GM (2009-2023)

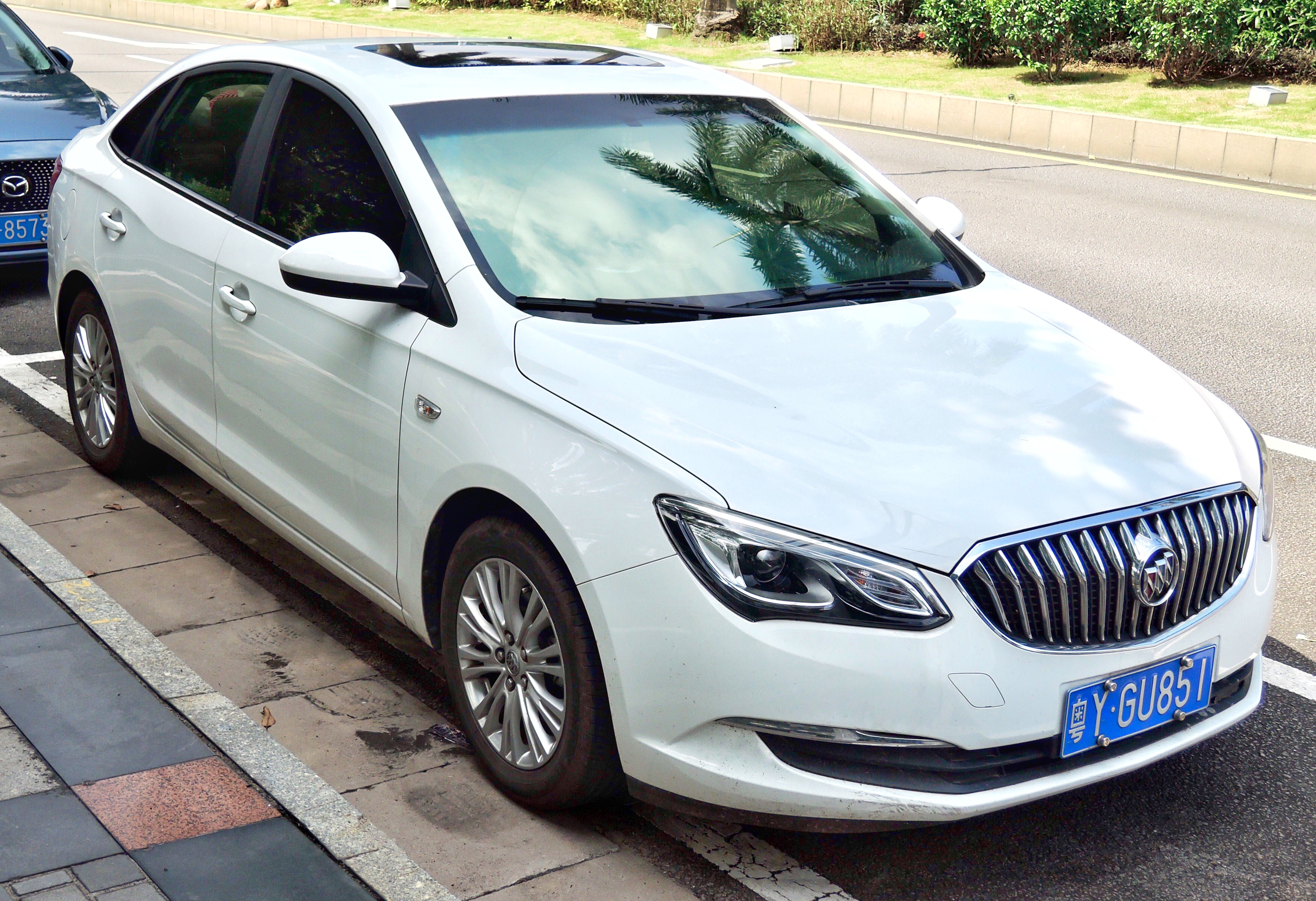

Overview
- Manufacturer: SAIC-GM
- Production: 2009–2023

Body and chassis
- Class: Compact car
- Layout: Front-engine, front-wheel-drive

The Buick Excelle GT (Chinese: 别克英朗; pinyin: Biékè yīnglǎng) is the name for the compact car manufactured by SAIC-GM under GM's Buick brand.

The original Buick Excelle (Chinese: 別克凱越; pinyin: Biékè kǎiyuè) was based on the Daewoo Lacetti developed by Daewoo Motors. Parallel to the Lacetti-based Excelle, Shanghai GM introduced a new car, also called "Buick Excelle" in China, but called "Ying Lang" in Chinese. It is based on GM's global compact car platform "Delta II" which was developed at Rüsselsheim in Opel's International Technical Development Center (ITDC). The globally sold Chevrolet Cruze as well as South Korean market Daewoo Lacetti Premiere were both based on this same Delta II platform.

Since the 2009 economic crises and the subsequent demise of the Saturn brand and reduction of GM's North American brands to four, certain Opel models were no longer aligned with the Saturn brand, but now with the Buick brand instead. Consequently, the models built and marketed by Buick China were twins of some Opel variants of GM's global platforms prior to the purchase of Opel and Vauxhall by Groupe PSA in 2017, while the Lacetti-based Excelle was re-positioned below Buick's newer offerings.

In China, a hatchback called the "Buick Excelle XT" (Chinese: 别克英朗XT; pinyin: Biékè yīnglǎng XT) debuted in 2009, which was essentially a rebadged Opel Astra J. A sedan debuted in 2010 called the "Buick Excelle GT" (Chinese: 别克英朗GT; pinyin: Biékè yīnglǎng GT).

A North American version of the Excelle GT was assembled in the United States from 2011 to 2016, and marketed as the Buick Verano.

In August 2016, Buick China decided to end 13 years of production of the original Buick Excelle (2003-2016) despite strong sales, with 2.68 million units sold over the course of 13 years. Citing its low price while the Buick brand was being moved upmarket in China as a main reason, there was no direct successor, with sister brands Chevrolet, Baojun and Wuling filling in the lower end market niche left unoccupied by the departure of the Buick Excelle.

== First generation (2009) ==
=== Excelle XT (hatchback) ===
Buick Excelle XT (first generation)
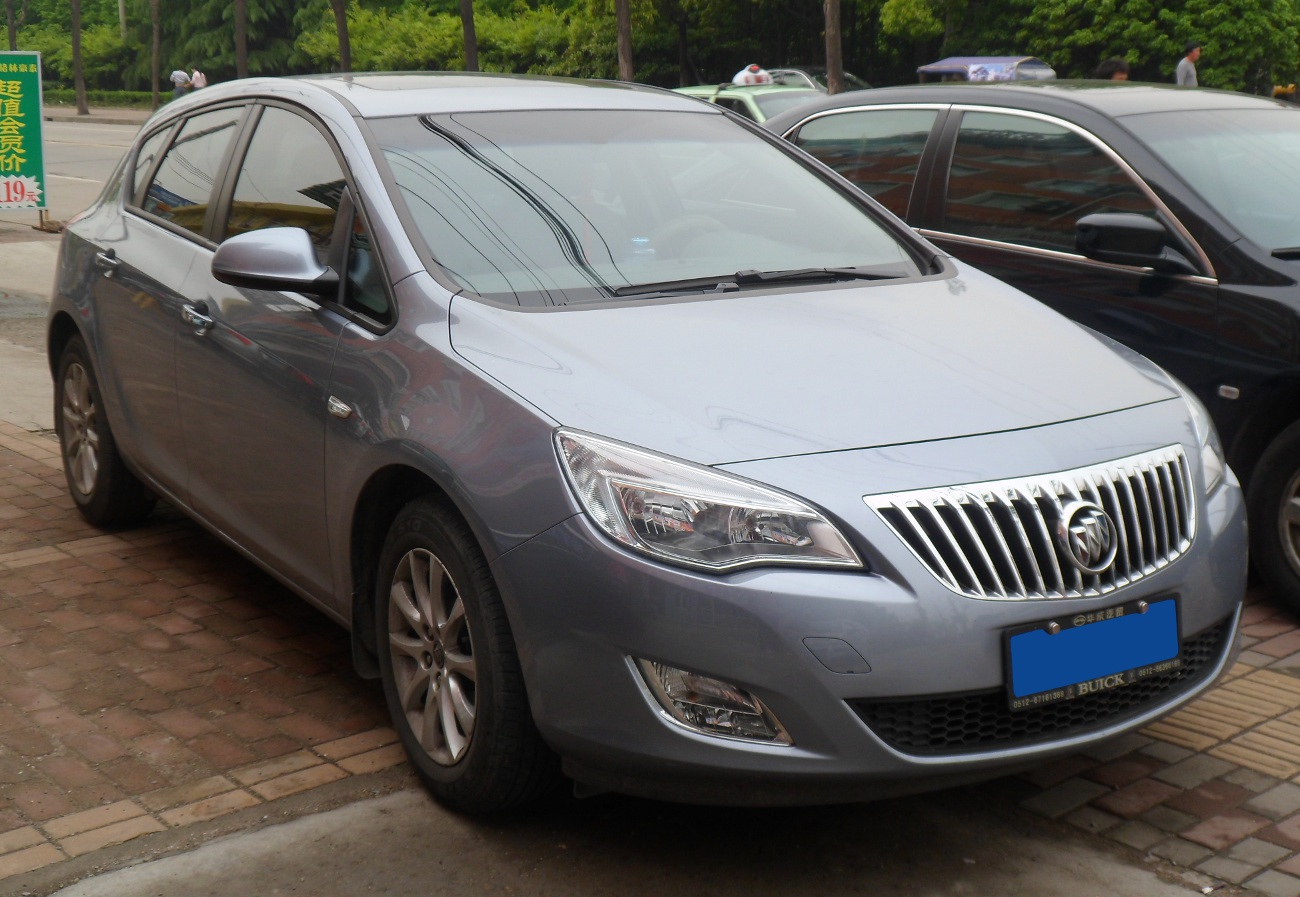

Overview
- Also called: Opel Astra; Vauxhall Astra (UK); Holden Astra (Australasia)
- Production: 2010–2015
- Assembly: China: Yantai, Shandong (SAIC-GM Dongyue Motors)
- Designer: Uwe Müller

Body and chassis
- Body style: 5-door hatchback
- Platform: Delta II platform

Powertrain
- Engine: 1.6 L Family 1 I4 (gasoline); 1.6 L Family 1 I4 (turbo gasoline); 1.8 L Family 1 I4 (gasoline)
- Transmission: 5 speed manual 6 speed automatic

Dimensions
- Wheelbase: 2,685 mm (105.7 in)
- Length: 4,419 mm (174.0 in)
- Width: 1,814 mm (71.4 in)
- Height: 1,487 mm (58.5 in)/1,508 mm (59.4 in)

The Excelle XT hatchback made its debut in late 2009 at the Guangzhou Auto Show and the Excelle GT sedan in June 2010. The hatch went on sale in China only in January 2010 and the sedan in June 2010. The XT is essentially a rebadged Opel Astra for the Chinese market only, with the most noticeable differences being Buick badges and a new grille.

Engine options for the Buick Excelle XT include:

- 1.6-liter turbocharged four-cylinder gasoline engine that delivers 135 kW.
- 1.6-liter inline four-cylinder gasoline engine with a two-stage variable intake manifold that delivers 85 kW.
- 1.8-liter DOHC inline four-cylinder gasoline engine that delivers 103 kW.

All engines are available with a six-speed automatic transmission featuring a sport mode.

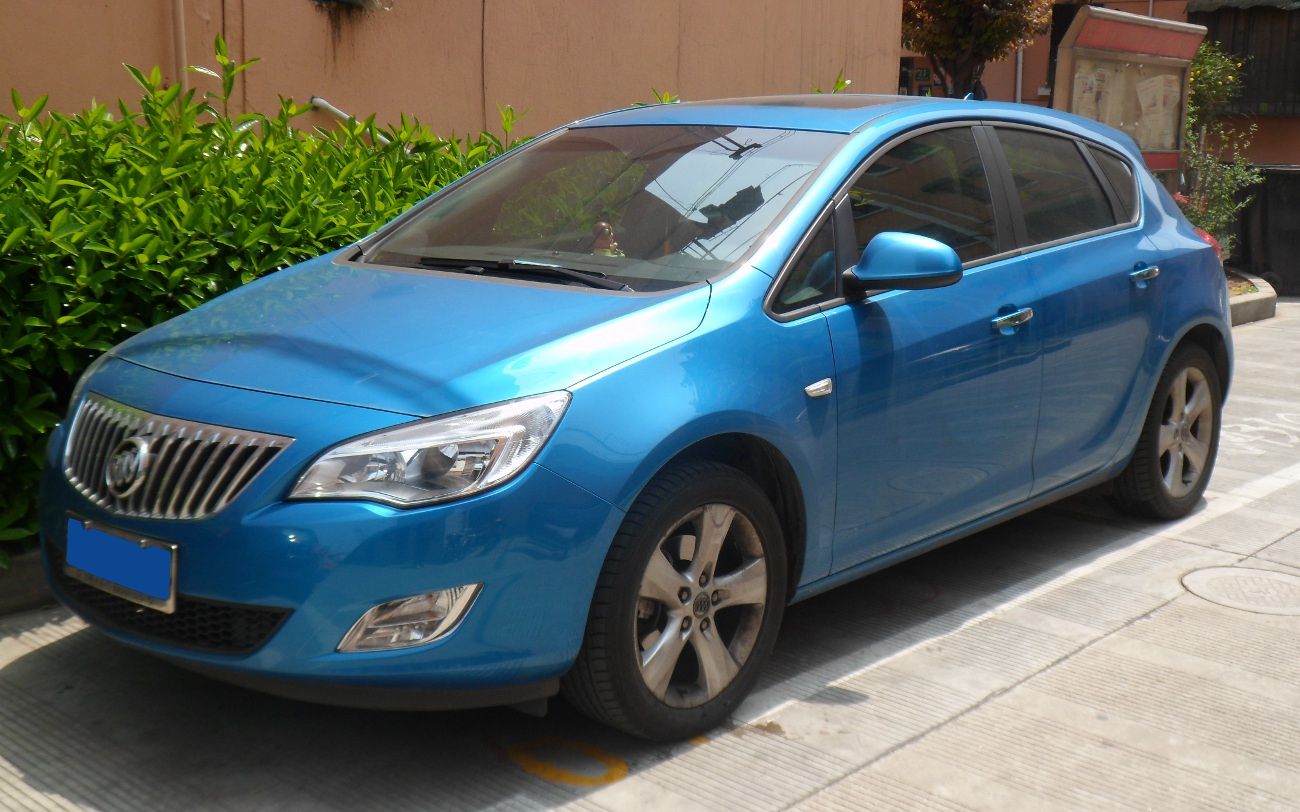
Buick Excelle XT hatchback front.

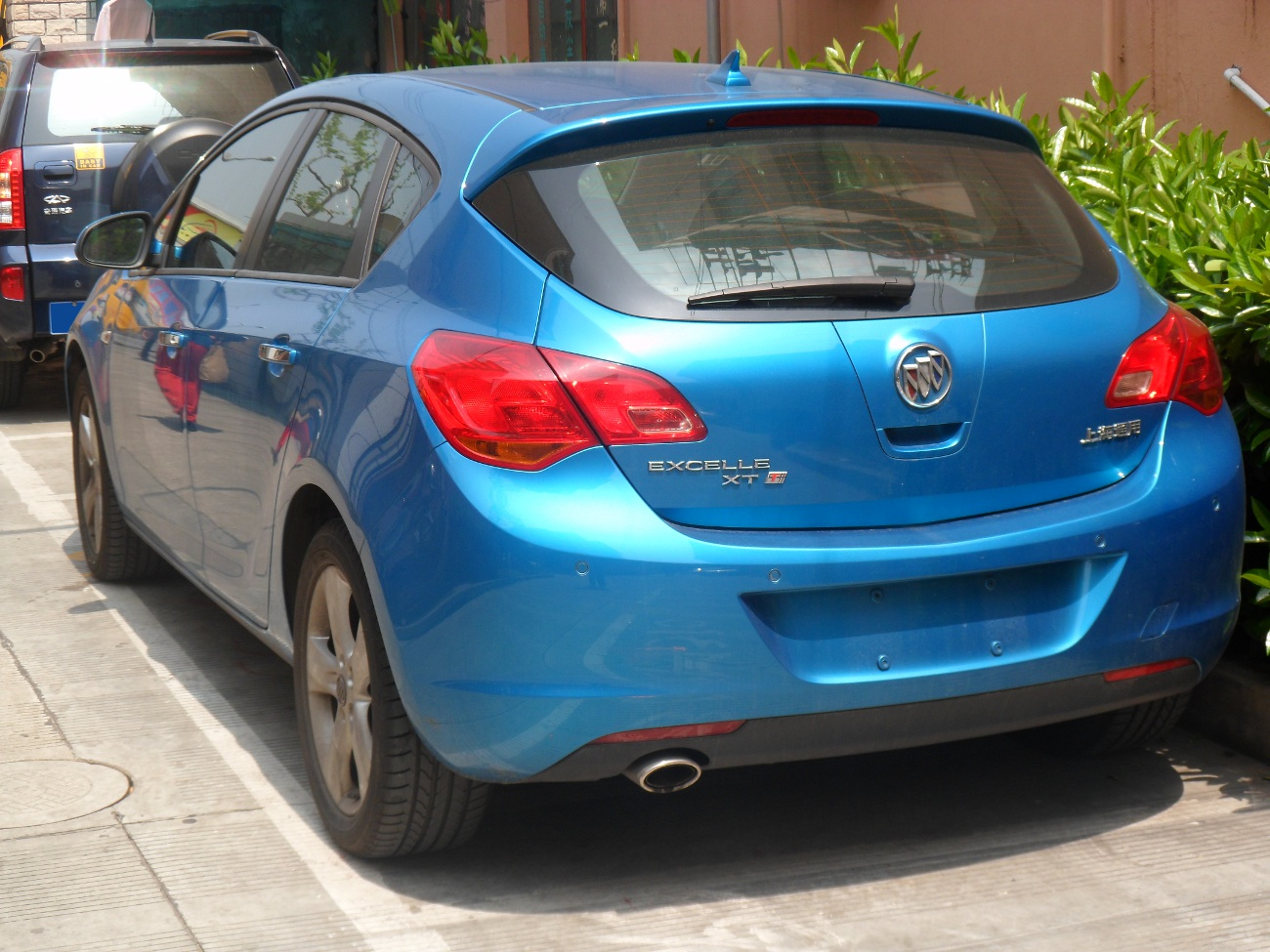
Buick Excelle XT hatchback rear.

=== Excelle GT (sedan) ===
Buick Excelle GT (first generation)
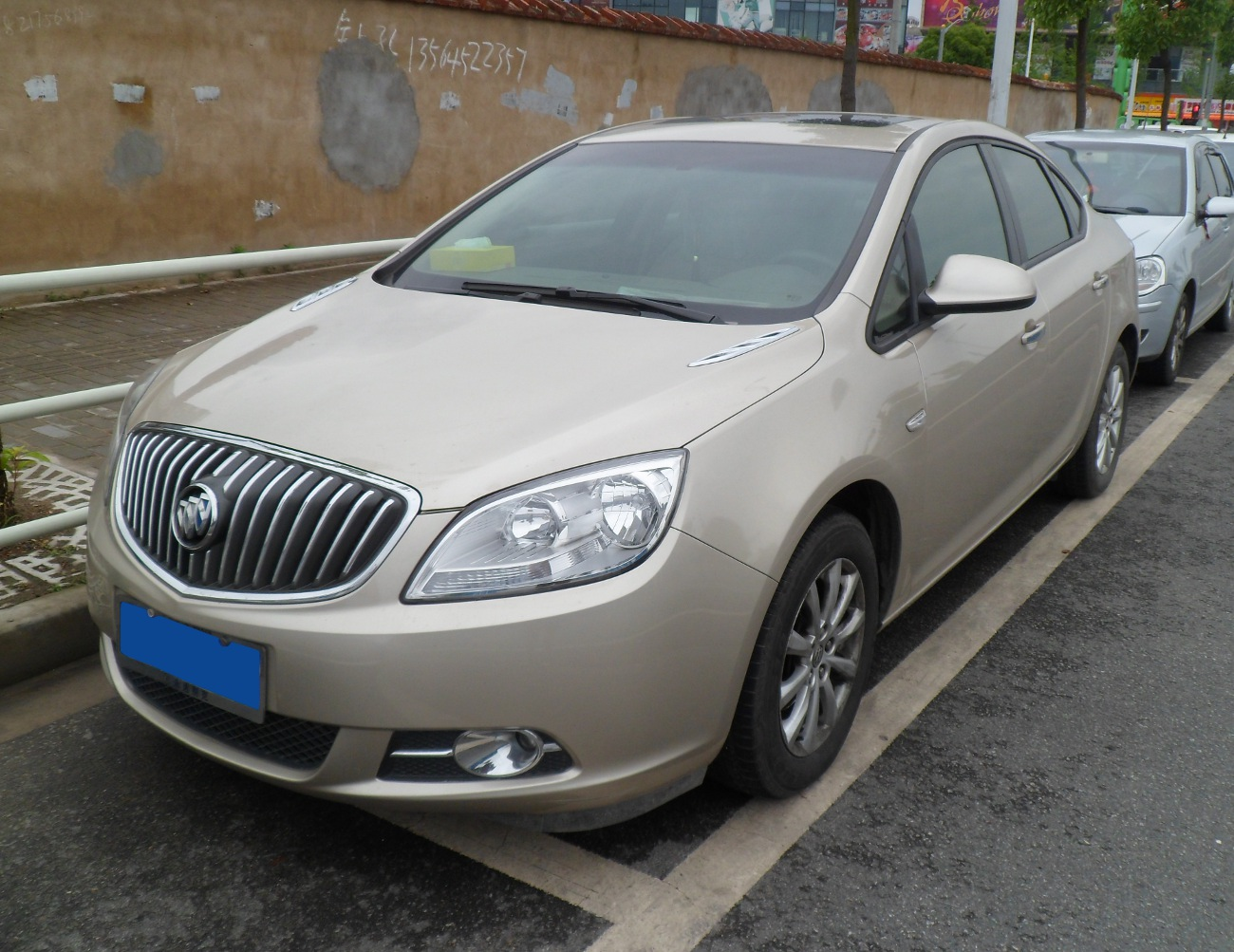

Overview
- Also called: Buick Verano
- Production: 2010–2015
- Assembly: China: Yantai, Shandong (SAIC-GM Dongyue Motors)
- Designer: James C. Shyr

Body and chassis
- Body style: 4-door sedan
- Platform: Delta II platform

Powertrain
- Engine: 1.6 L Family 1 I4 (gasoline); 1.6 L Family 1 I4 (turbo gasoline); 1.8 L Family 1 I4 (gasoline)
- Transmission: 5 speed manual 6 speed automatic

Dimensions
- Wheelbase: 2,685 mm (105.7 in)
- Length: 4,671 mm (183.9 in)
- Width: 1,814 mm (71.4 in)
- Height: 1,483 mm (58.4 in)

Another version of the Opel Astra that shares the design cues of the Excelle GT is assembled and marketed in North America as the Buick Verano. Production of the Verano began in the fourth quarter of 2011 at the General Motors Orion Assembly plant. The Verano went on sale late in 2011 as a 2012 model.

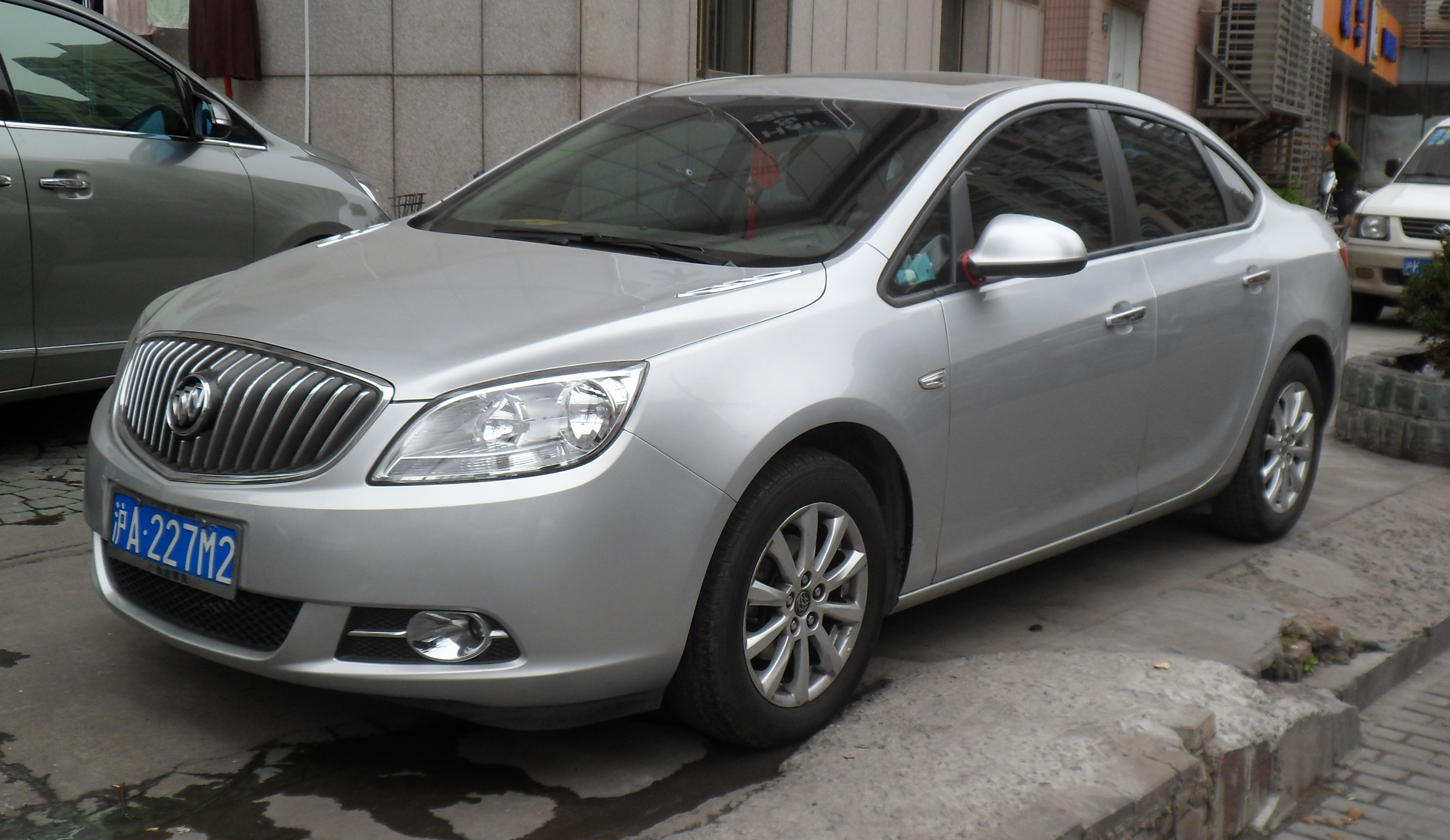
Buick Excelle GT sedan front.

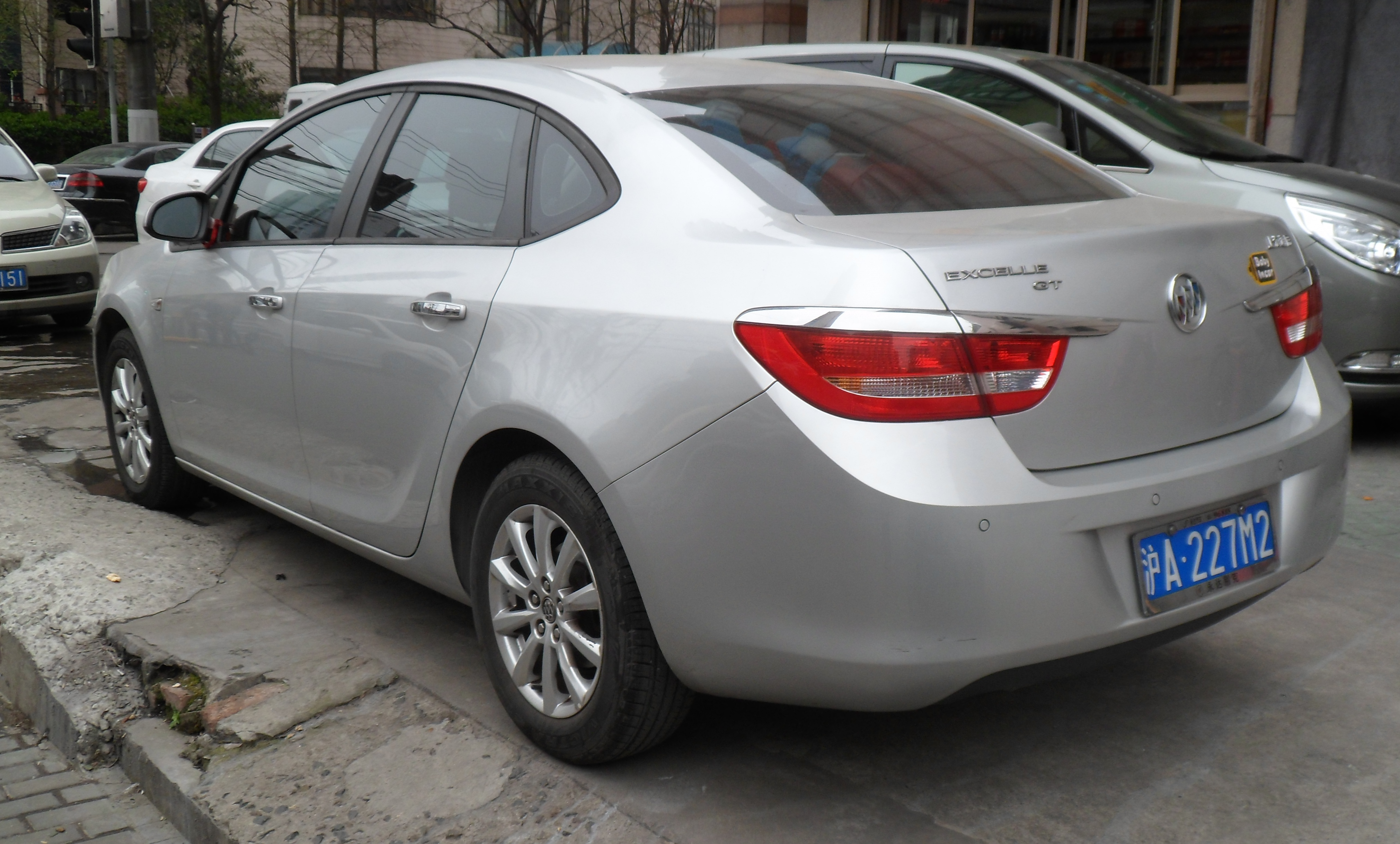
Buick Excelle GT sedan rear.

== Second generation (2015) ==
Buick Excelle GT (second generation)
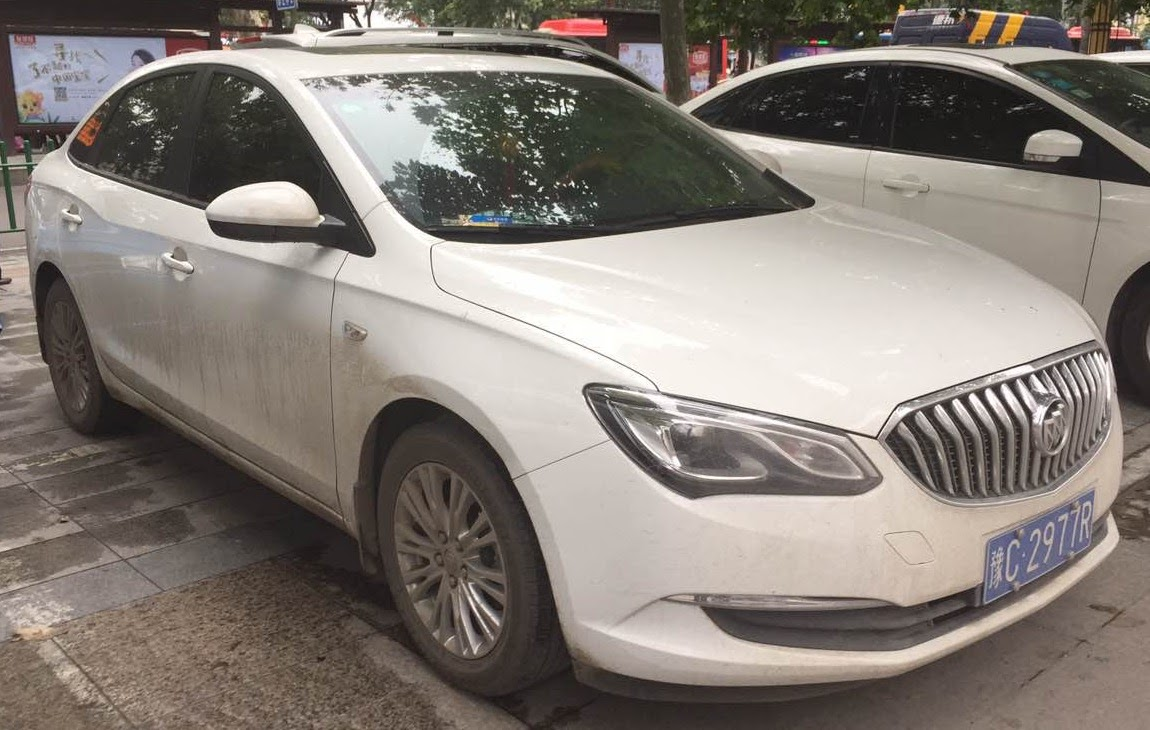

Overview
- Also called: Buick Excelle GX (station wagon)
- Production: 2015–2023
- Assembly: China: Wuhan (SAIC-GM Wuhan Branch)
- Designer: Yin He

Body and chassis
- Body style: 4-door sedan 5-door station wagon
- Layout: Front-engine, front-wheel drive
- Platform: D2XX or GM-PATAC K
- Related: Buick GL6; Chevrolet Monza (China); Roewe i5

Powertrain
- Engine: 1.0 L EcoTec Turbo I3; 1.3 L EcoTec Turbo I3; 1.4 L EcoTec Turbo I4; 1.5 L L2B I4
- Transmission: 6 speed manual 5 speed manual 6 speed automatic 6 speed DCT; 7 speed DCT

Dimensions
- Wheelbase: 2,640 mm (103.9 in)
- Length: 4,587 mm (180.6 in), 4,609 mm (181.5 in) (facelift)
- Width: 1,798 mm (70.8 in)
- Height: 1,463 mm (57.6 in), 1,486 mm (58.5 in) (facelift)
- Curb weight: 1,285 kg (facelift)

A new Buick Excelle GT was introduced as a 2015 model. The new model has a completely new look, with new front and rear bumpers, new lights, new grille, and a more luxurious cabin. New engines included are a 1.4-liter turbocharged engine mated to a seven-speed dual-clutch transmission or a 1.5-liter 113 hp (84 kW) mated to a five speed manual or six-speed automatic transmission. Trim levels for this model are called 15N and 18T. Production of the new model began in March 2015.

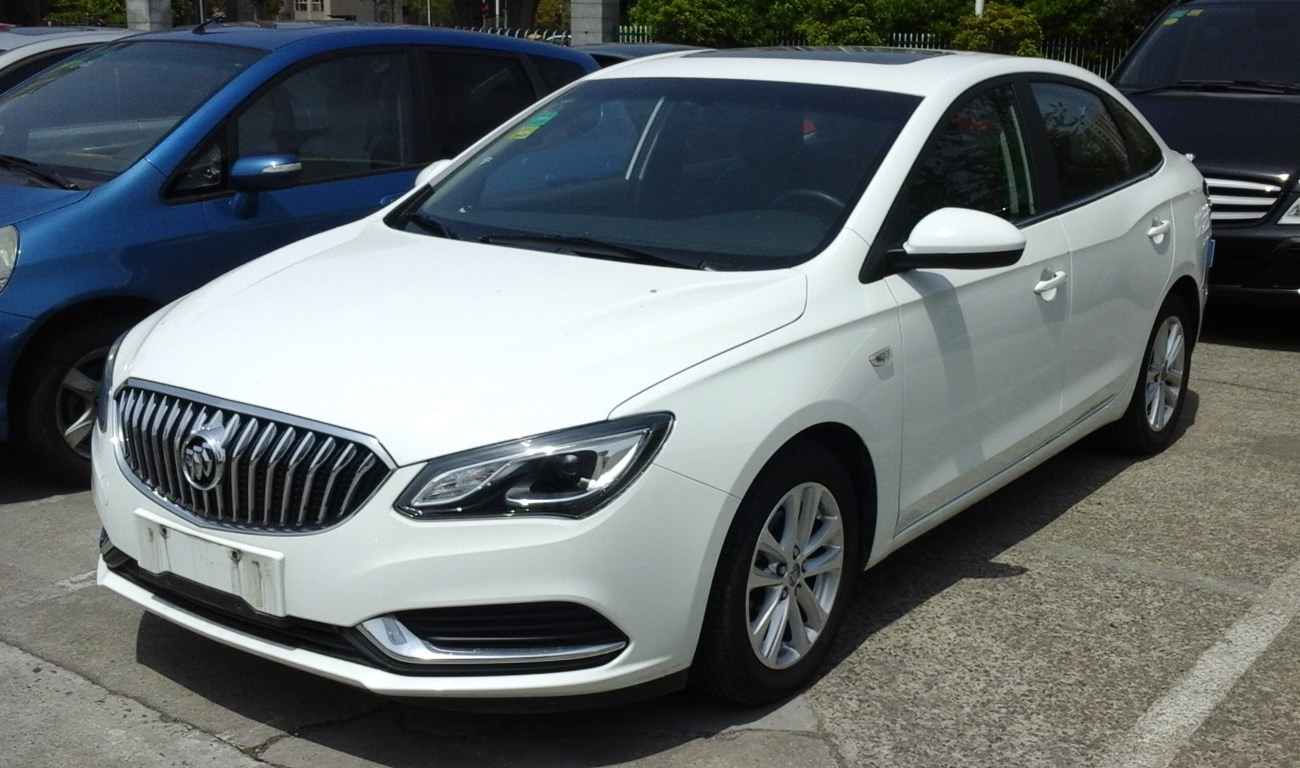
Pre-facelift Buick Excelle GT sedan front.

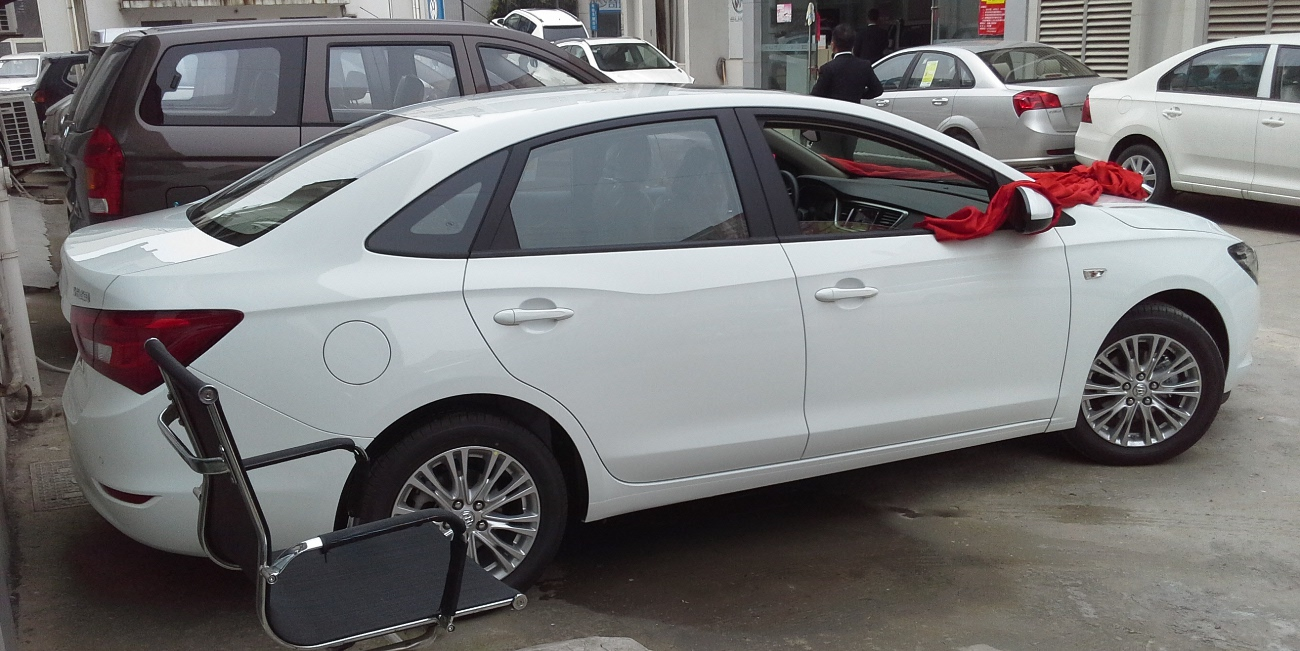
Pre-facelift Buick Excelle GT sedan side.

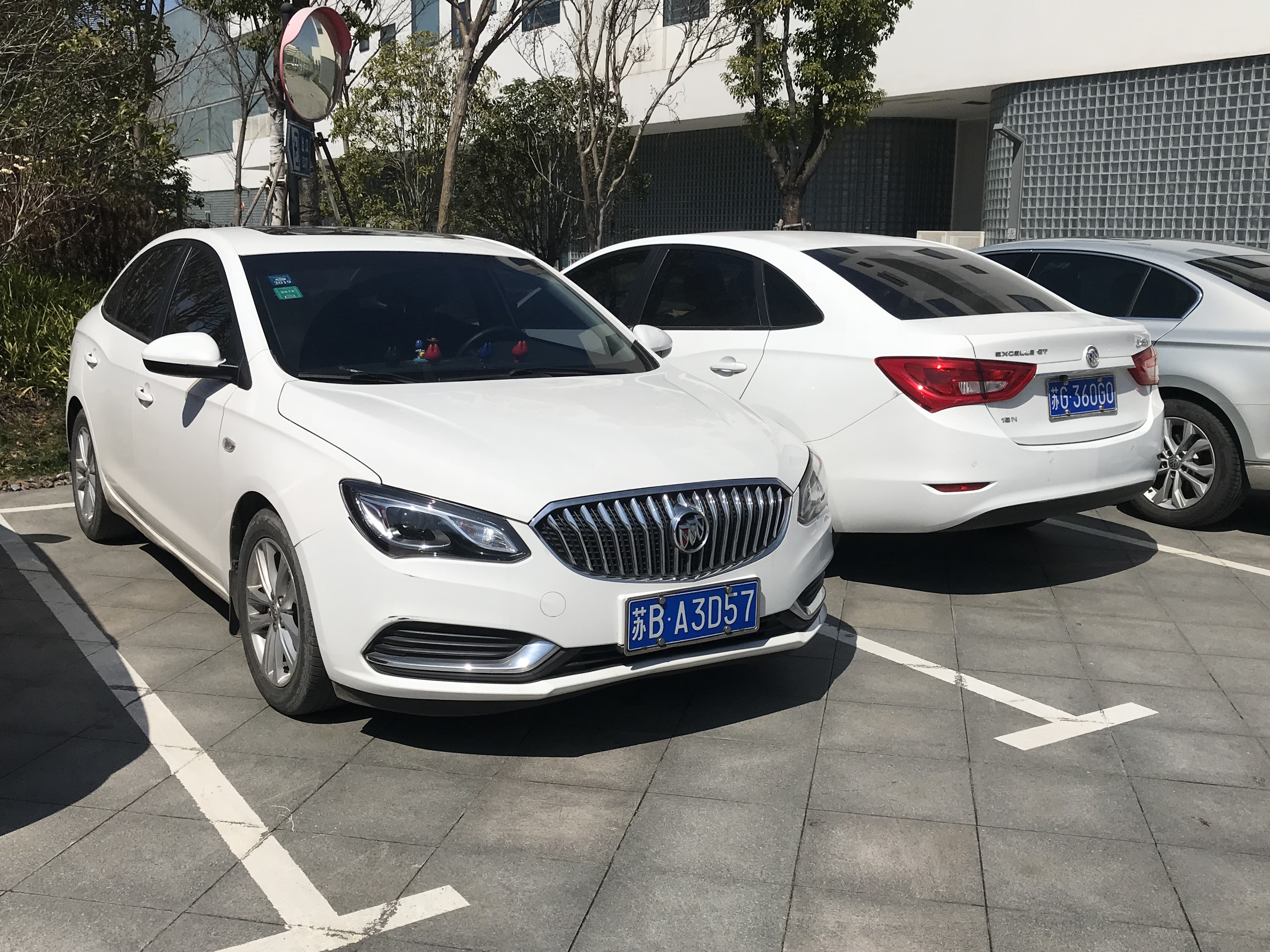
Pre-facelift Buick Excelle GT sedans front and rear.

=== 2018 facelift ===
In late 2017, Buick announced a facelift update for the 2018 model year that adds the new Buick grilles with the spreading wings to the Verano and Excelle products. The update applies to the Buick Verano sedan/hatchback, Buick Excelle GT sedan, and added a Buick Excelle GX station wagon as an additional new body style. 1 liter and 1.3 liter three cylinder engines were added to the range along with both 6 speed manual and dual clutch gearboxes.

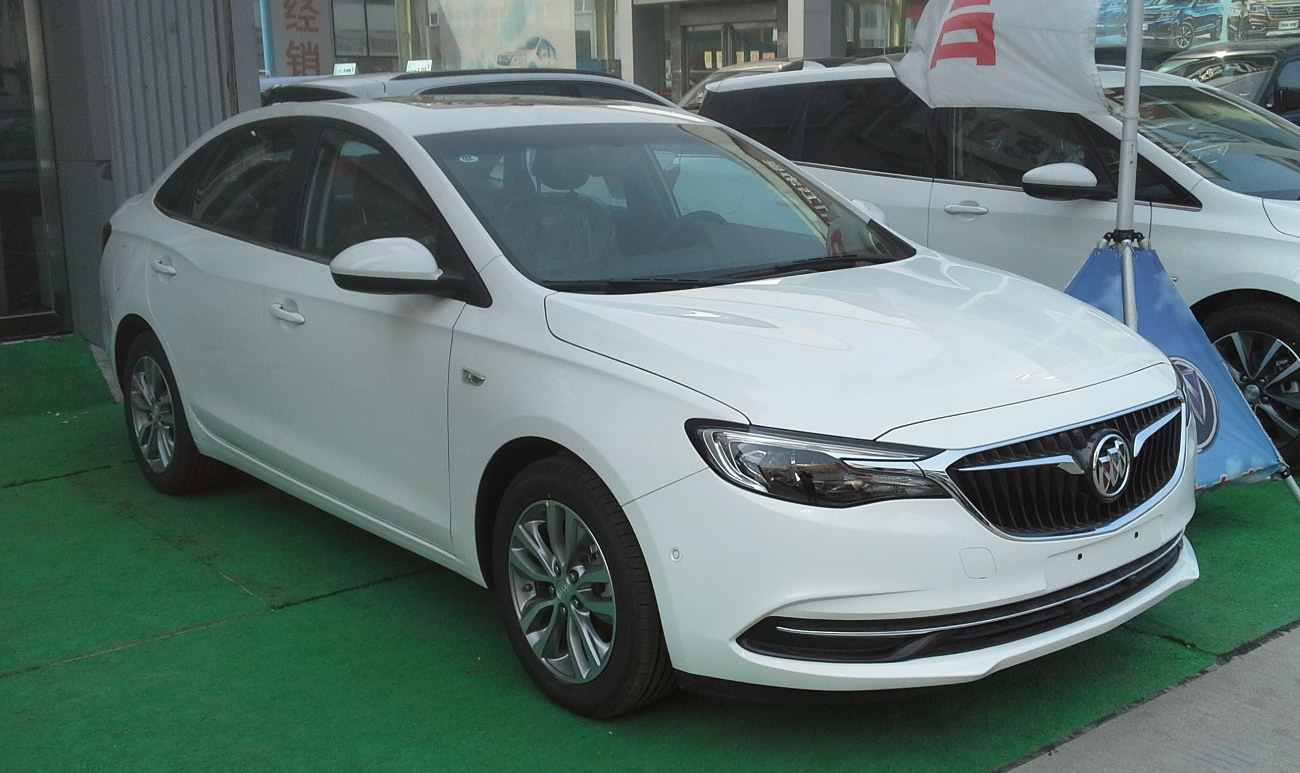
2018 Buick Excelle GT facelift front.

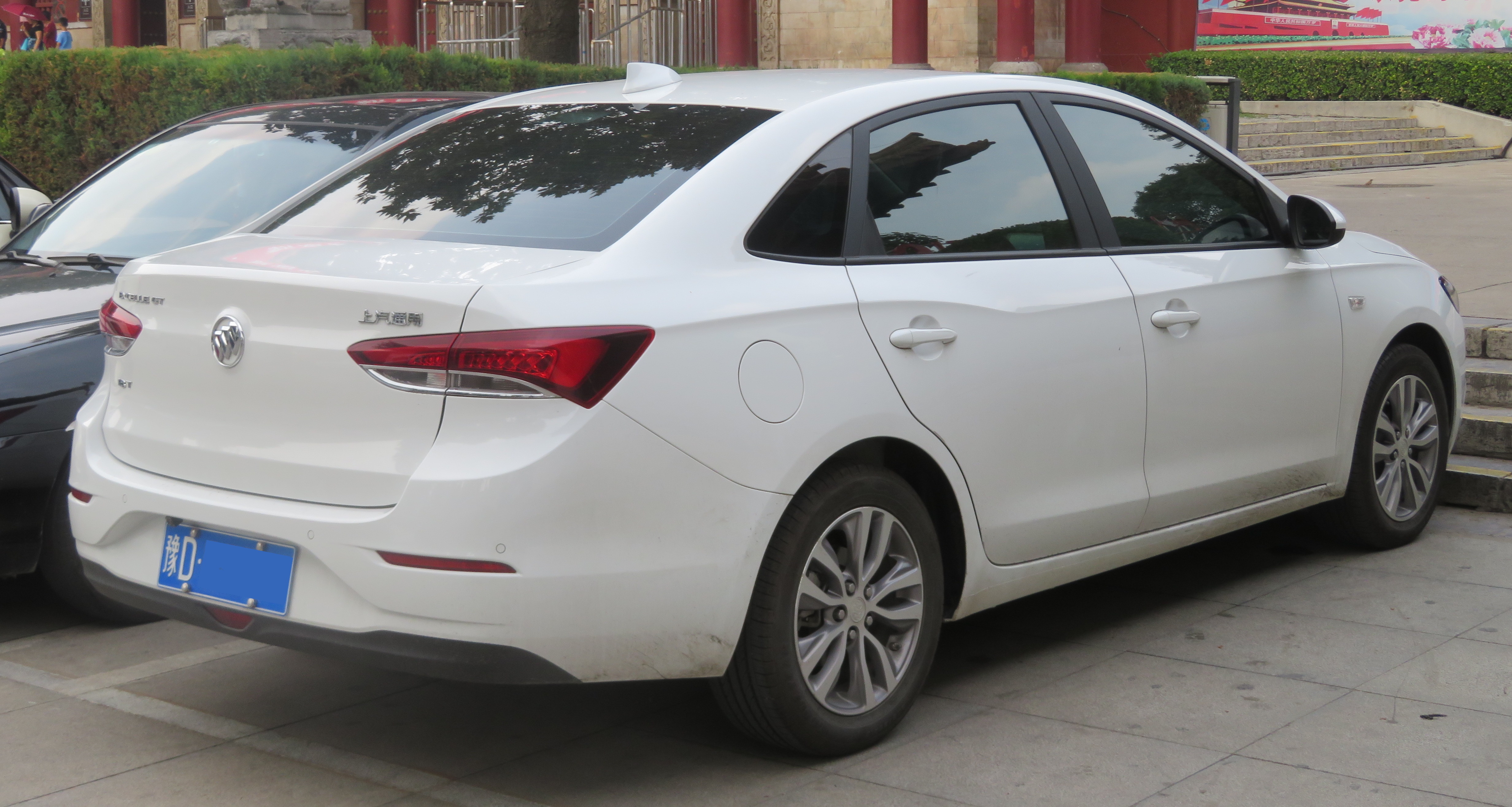
2018 Buick Excelle GT facelift rear.

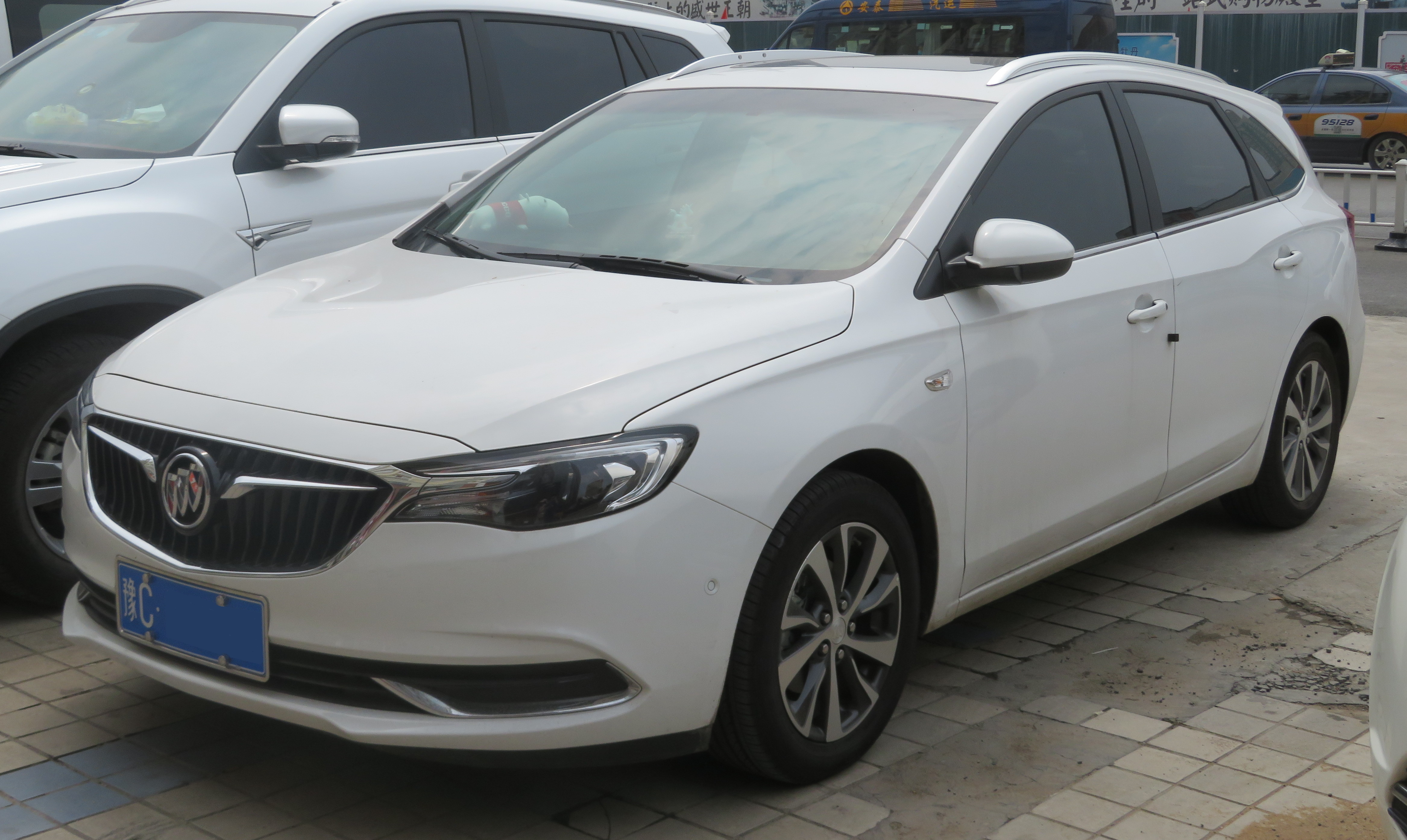
2018 Buick Excelle GX estate front.

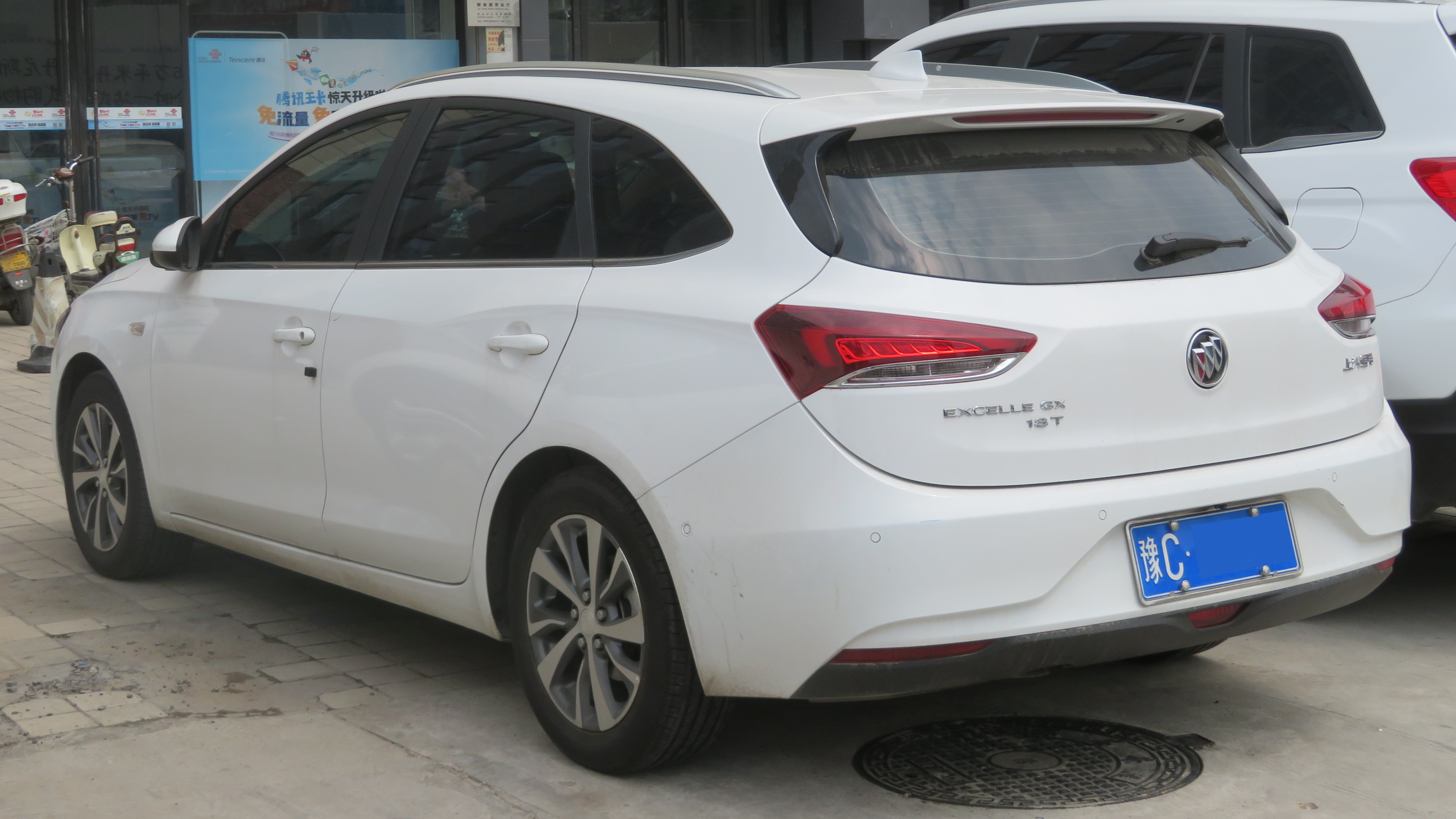
2018 Buick Excelle GX estate rear.

== Sales ==
| Year | China |
|---|---|
| 2012 | 322,808 |
| 2013 | |
| 2014 | |
| 2015 | |
| 2016 | |
| 2017 | |
| 2018 | 300,347 |
| 2019 | 296,792 |
| 2020 | 295,857 |
| 2021 | 263,017 |
| 2022 | 63,744 |
| 2023 | 3,607 |
| 2024 | 1 |
