= Buick Excelle =

Subcompact cars produced by Shanghai General Motors (2003-2023)

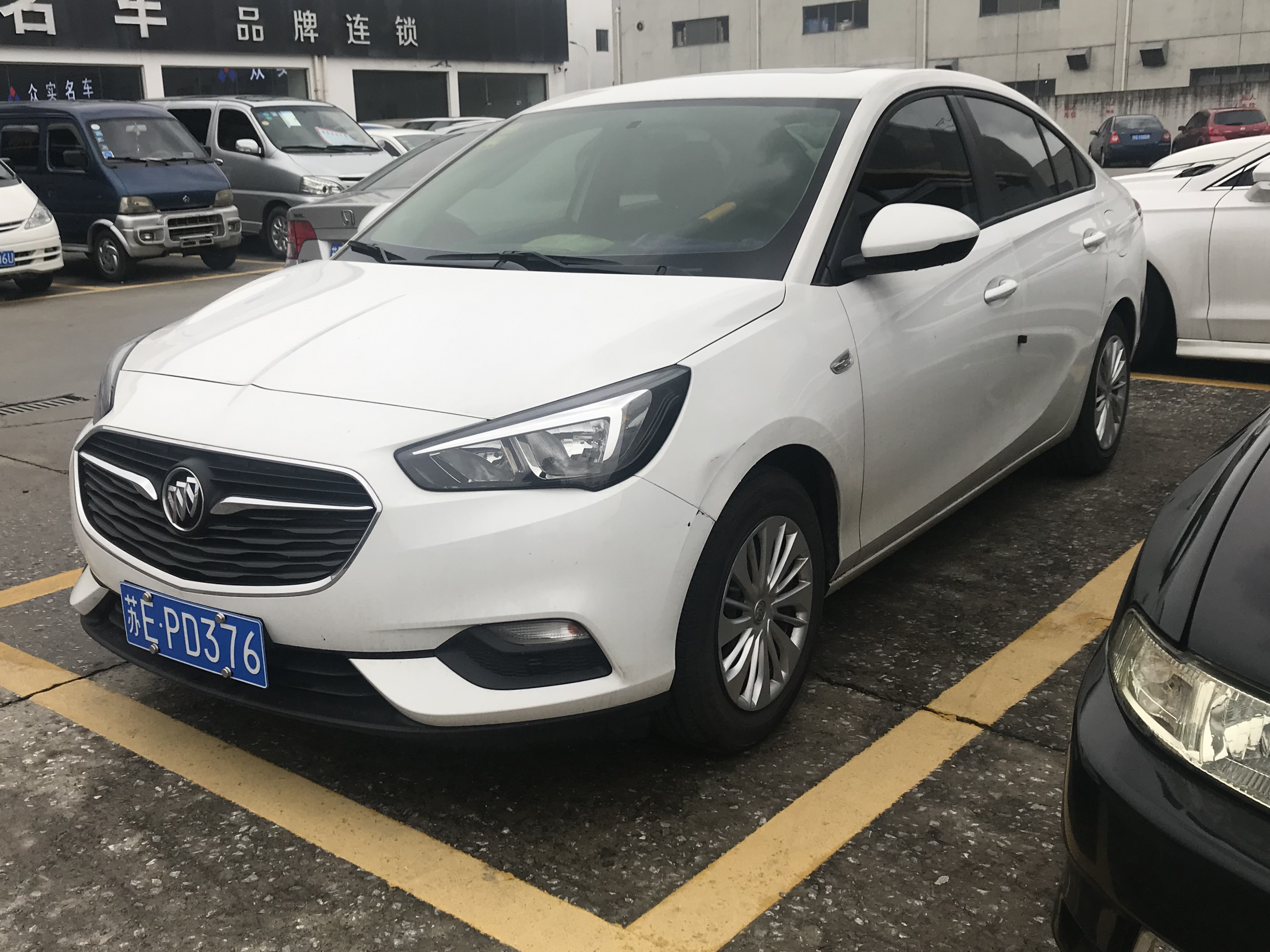

Overview
- Manufacturer: SAIC-GM
- Production: 2003–2016; 2018–2023
- Assembly: China: Shanghai

Body and chassis
- Class: Compact (China), Subcompact (global) (B)

Chronology
- Predecessor: Buick Sail

The Buick Excelle (Chinese: 別克凱越; pinyin: Biékè kǎiyuè) is the common name for the subcompact cars marketed by Shanghai General Motors Company Limited (Chinese: 上海通用汽車有限公司) under GM's Buick brand. It is classified as a compact in China, but by international standards it is a subcompact car.

The original Buick Excelle (Chinese "Kai Yue") is based on the Daewoo Lacetti developed in South Korea by Daewoo Motors. While this car was originally sold worldwide under the Daewoo brand, in 2004, General Motors rebranded all Daewoo products in Europe as Chevrolets.

Parallel to the Lacetti-based Excelle, Shanghai GM introduced a new car called the Buick Excelle GT in China, but called "Ying Lang" in Chinese. It is based on GM's global compact car platform "Delta II" which is developed at Rüsselsheim in Opel's International Technical Development Center (ITDC). The Chevrolet Cruze is based on this same platform.

Since the 2009 economic crises and the subsequent demise of the Saturn brand and reduction of GM's North American brands to four, the Opel models are aligned no longer with the Saturn brand, but the Buick brand. Consequently, the models built and marketed by Buick China are twins of the Opel variants of GM's global platforms while the Lacetti-based Excelle was re-positioned below Buick's newer offerings in the Chinese market.

In China, a hatchback called the Buick Excelle XT debuted in 2009, which is essentially a rebadged Astra J. A sedan debuted in 2010 called the Buick Excelle GT (Chinese: 别克英朗GT). An estate car based on the second generation Buick Excelle GT debuted in 2018 called the Buick Excelle GX.

In August 2016, Buick decided to end Excelle production despite strong sales, with 2.68 million units sold over the course of 13 years. Citing its low price while the brand moves upmarket as a main reason, there will be no direct successor, with Chevrolet and Wuling filling in the low-end market niche left unoccupied by the departure of the Excelle.

In June 2018, Buick launched the second generation of the Buick Excelle. Positioning under the Excelle GT, the second generation Excelle was based on a new platform and stand as a completely new model. The Excelle was discontinued in 2023 with no replacement currently planned.

== First generation (J200; 2003) ==
First generation
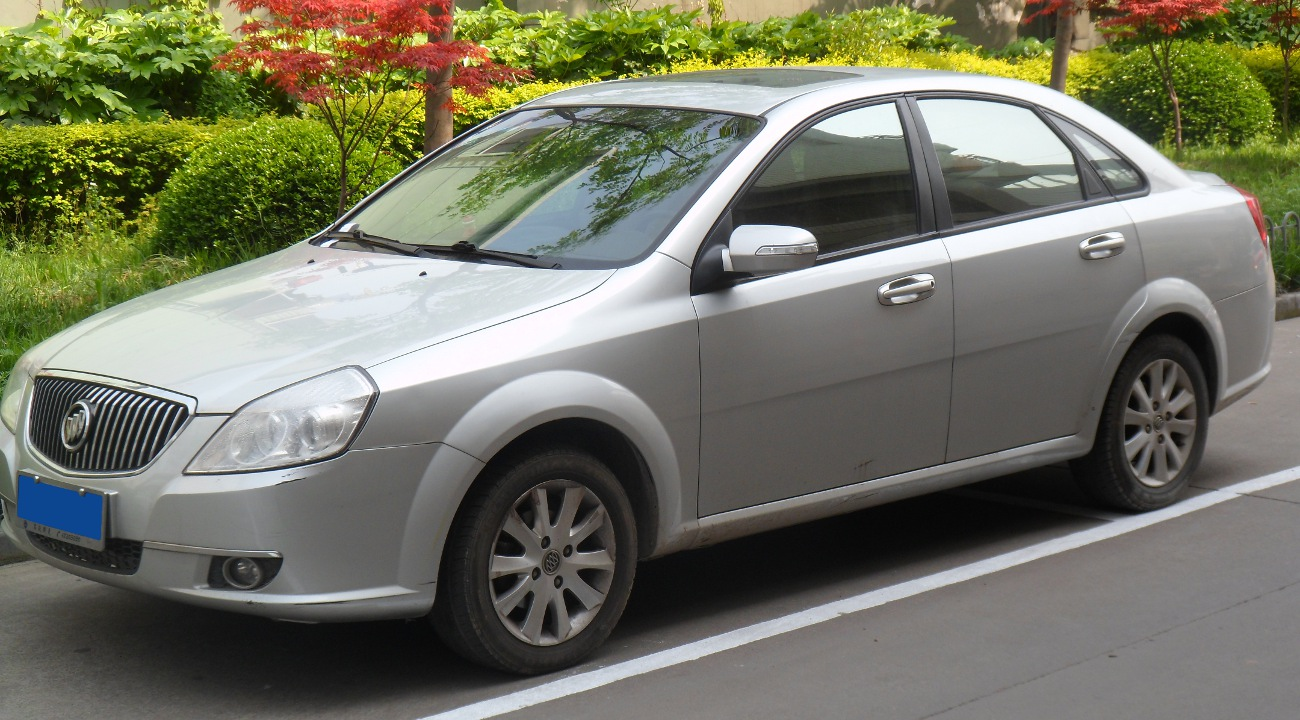

Overview
- Model code: J200
- Also called: Chevrolet Lacetti (Europe & Uzbekistan); Chevrolet Optra (Asia, South America, Canada, Mexico, South Africa); Chevrolet Estate (Indonesia); Chevrolet Nubira (Europe, sedan & wagon); Daewoo Lacetti (Korea, Hatchback in Europe); Daewoo Nubira (Europe, sedan & wagon); Daewoo Gentra (Uzbekistan); Holden Viva (Australia); Ravon Gentra (Russia); Suzuki Reno (United States, hatchback); Suzuki Forenza (United States, sedan)
- Production: 2003–2016 (Sedan); 2005–2009 (HRV and Wagon)
- Assembly: China: Shanghai (SAIC-GM); Taiwan: (Yulon GM)

Body and chassis
- Body style: 4-door sedan 5-door hatchback 5-door station wagon

Powertrain
- Engine: 1.5 L L2B I4; 1.6 L F16D3 I4; 1.8 L T18SED I4
- Transmission: 5 speed D16 manual 6 speed automatic 4 speed Step-Gate automatic

Dimensions
- Wheelbase: 2,600 mm (102.4 in)
- Length: 4,515 mm (177.8 in)
- Width: 1,725 mm (67.9 in)
- Height: 1,445 mm (56.9 in)

The first generation was available in a sedan or wagon and Excelle HRV (hatchback) and was a rebadged Daewoo Lacetti. The HRV and wagon were produced from 2005 to 2009 while the sedan continued to be produced locally in Shanghai from April 2003 to August 2016.

The model year 2008 received a facelift consisting of a new front fascia, new rear end design and updated interior. The facelift was partly inspired by the Buick Park Avenue, and the front light units and bumpers were redesigned while the front fenders remain the same units. A second facelift consisting of a new grille was released in 2013. A 1.6 litre engine was standard under the trim level LX until 2013 where a 1.5 litre engine replaced it. The new trim levels were 1.5 MT Classical, 1.5 MT Premium, 1.5 AT Classical and 1.5 AT Premium. Pricing was between 96,900 yuan to 118,900 yuan throughout its production run.

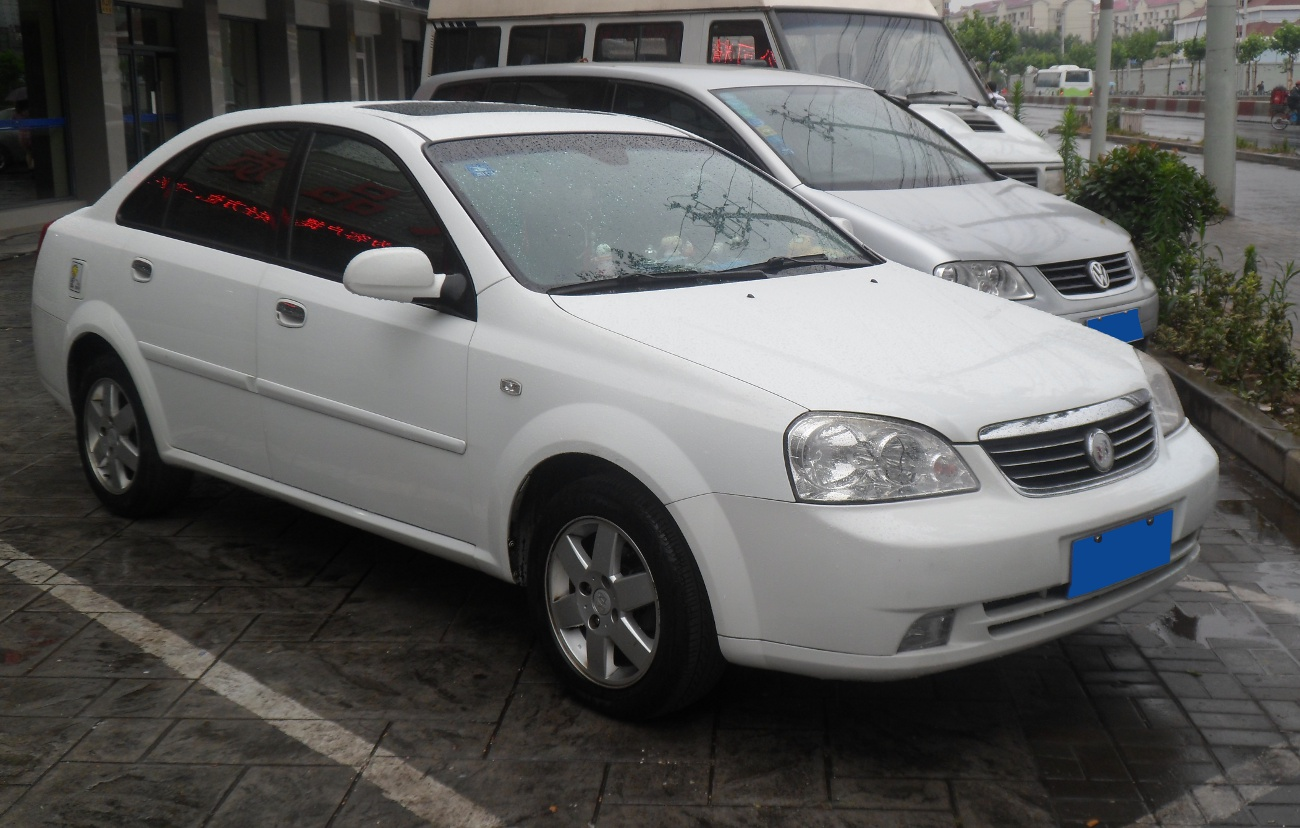
Buick Excelle front (pre-facelift)

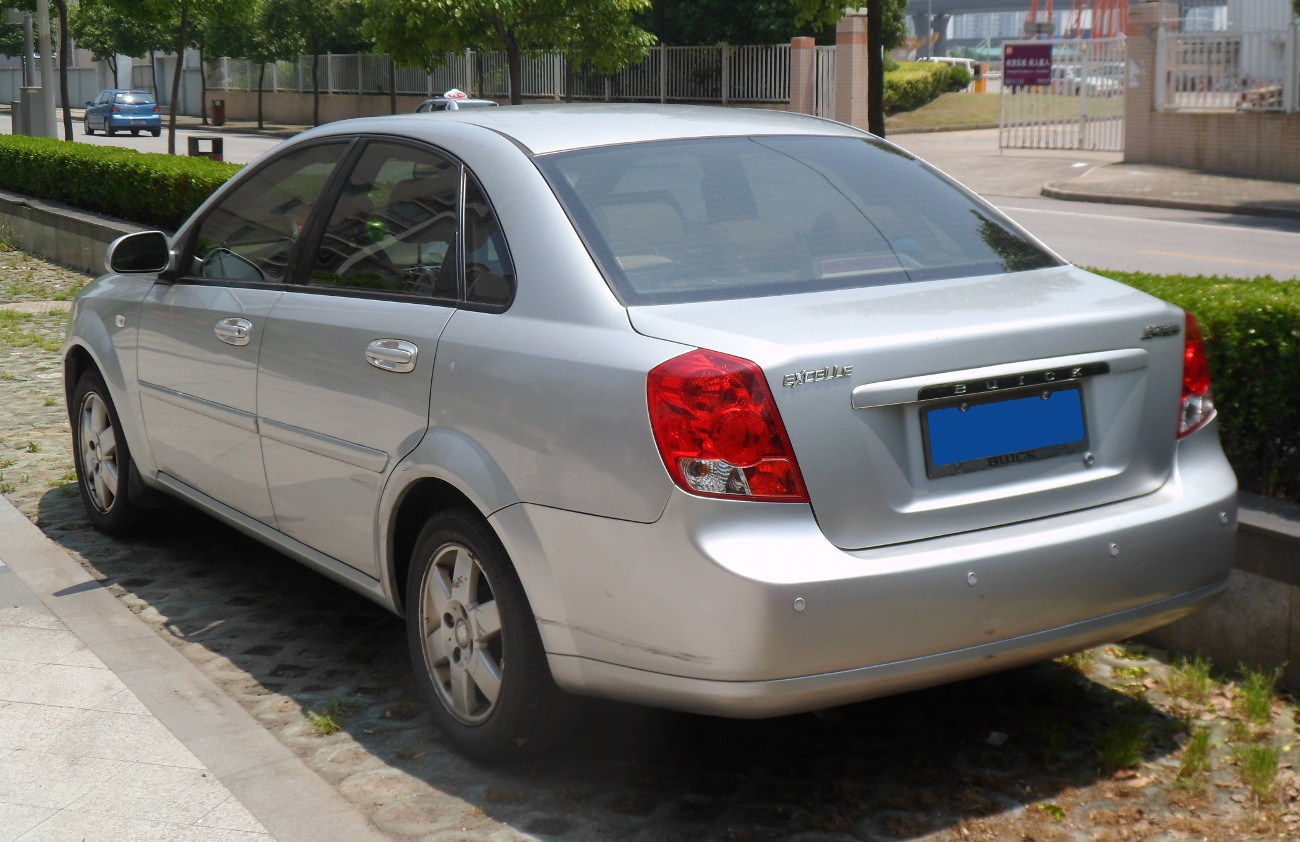
Buick Excelle rear (pre-facelift)

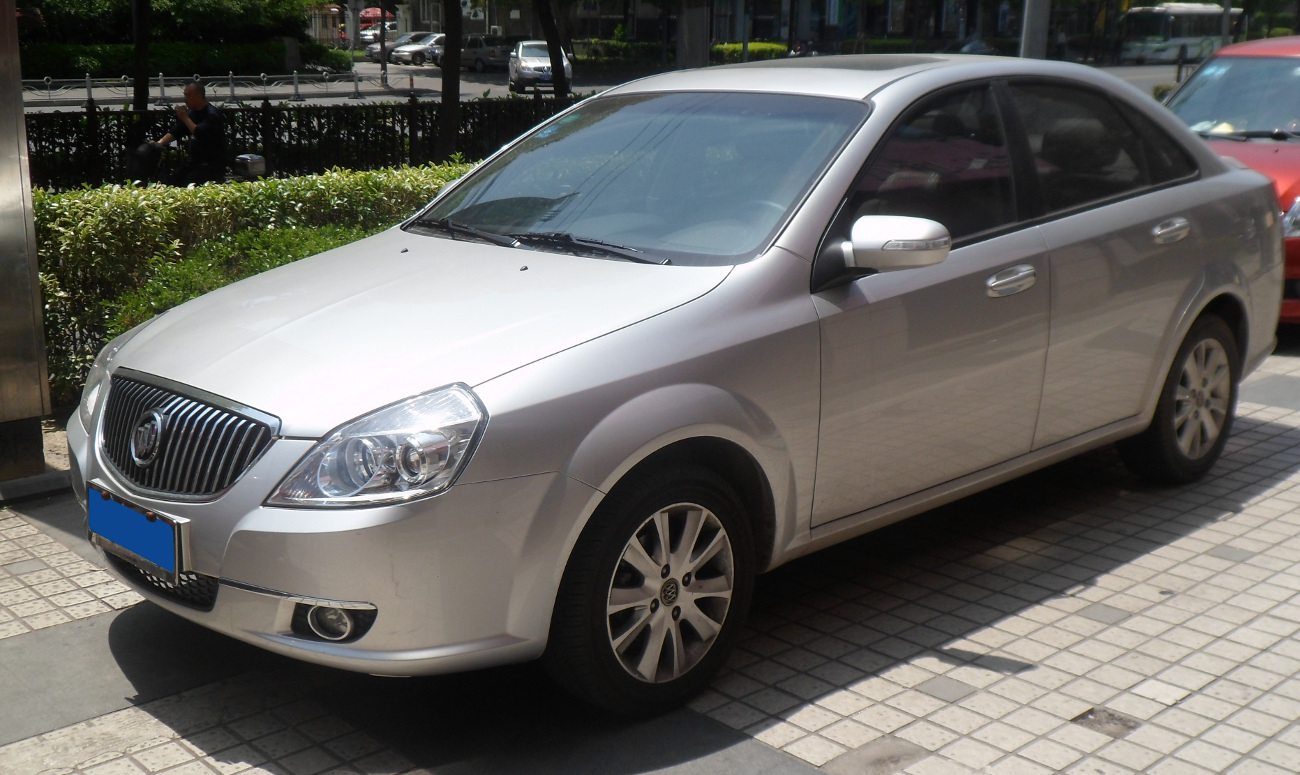
Buick Excelle front (facelift)

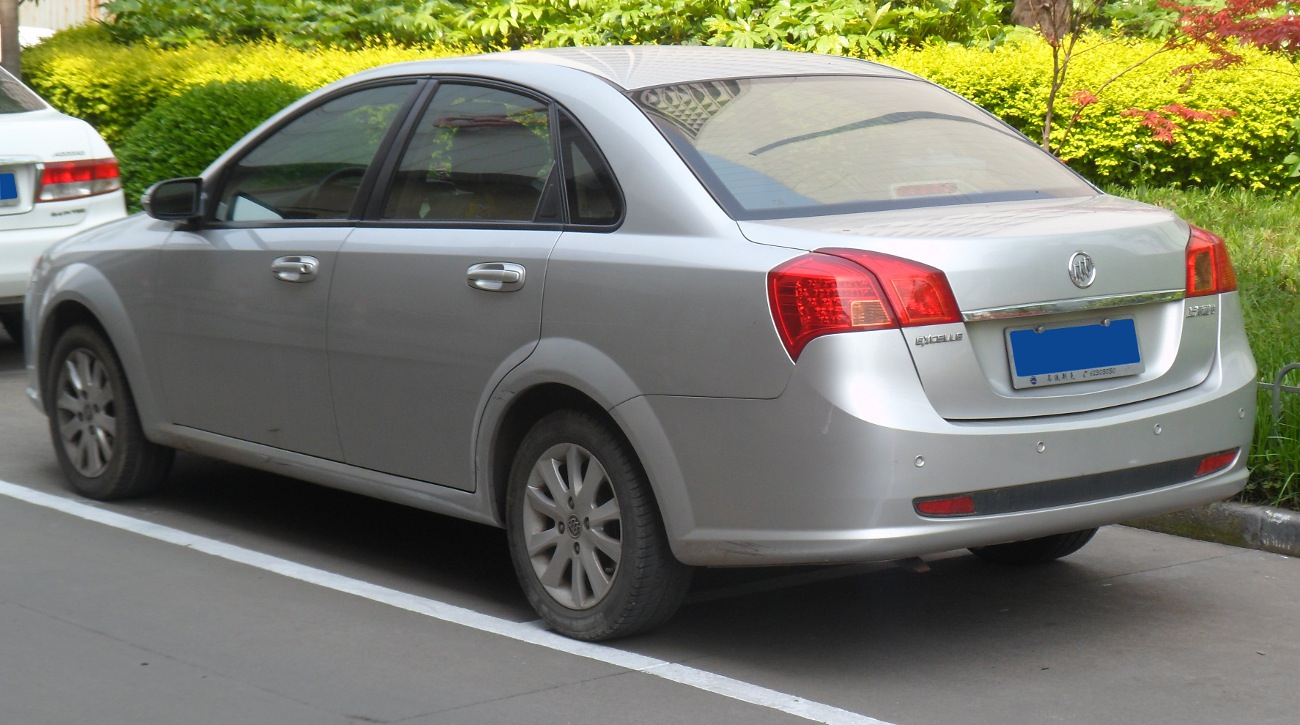
Buick Excelle rear (facelift)

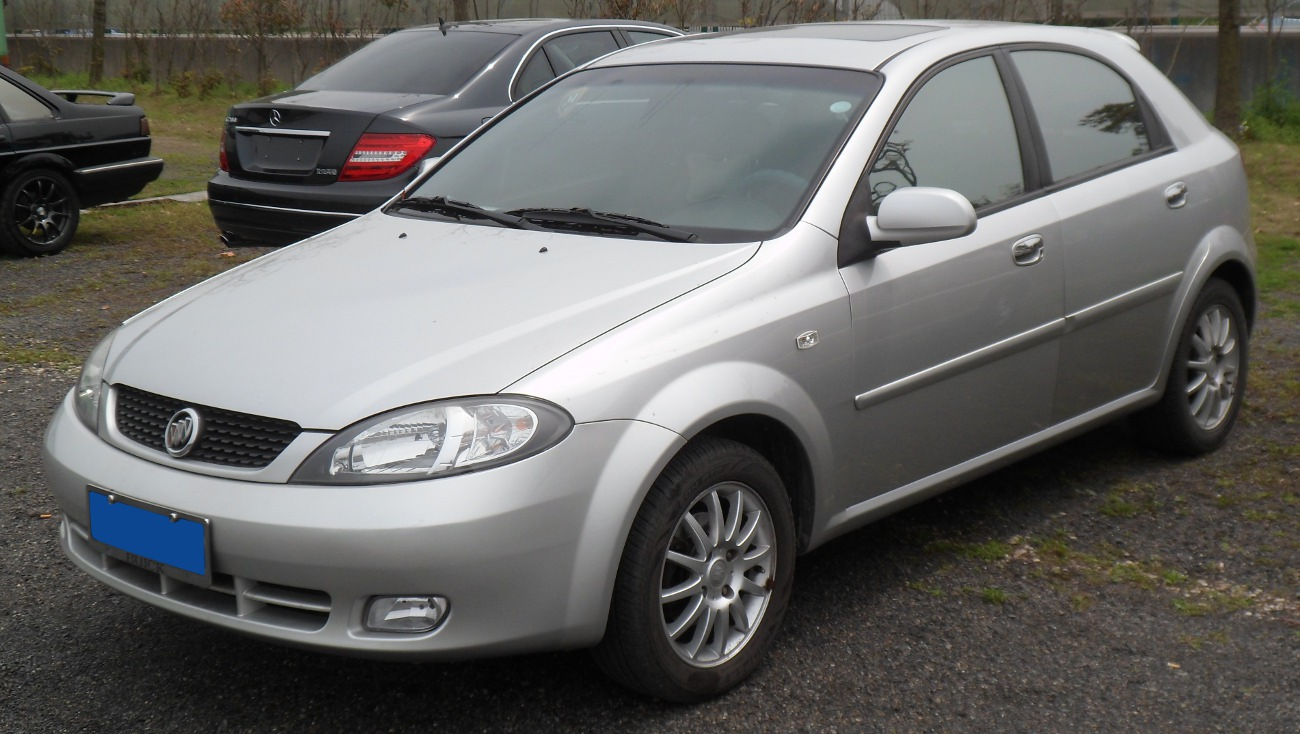
Buick Excelle HRV

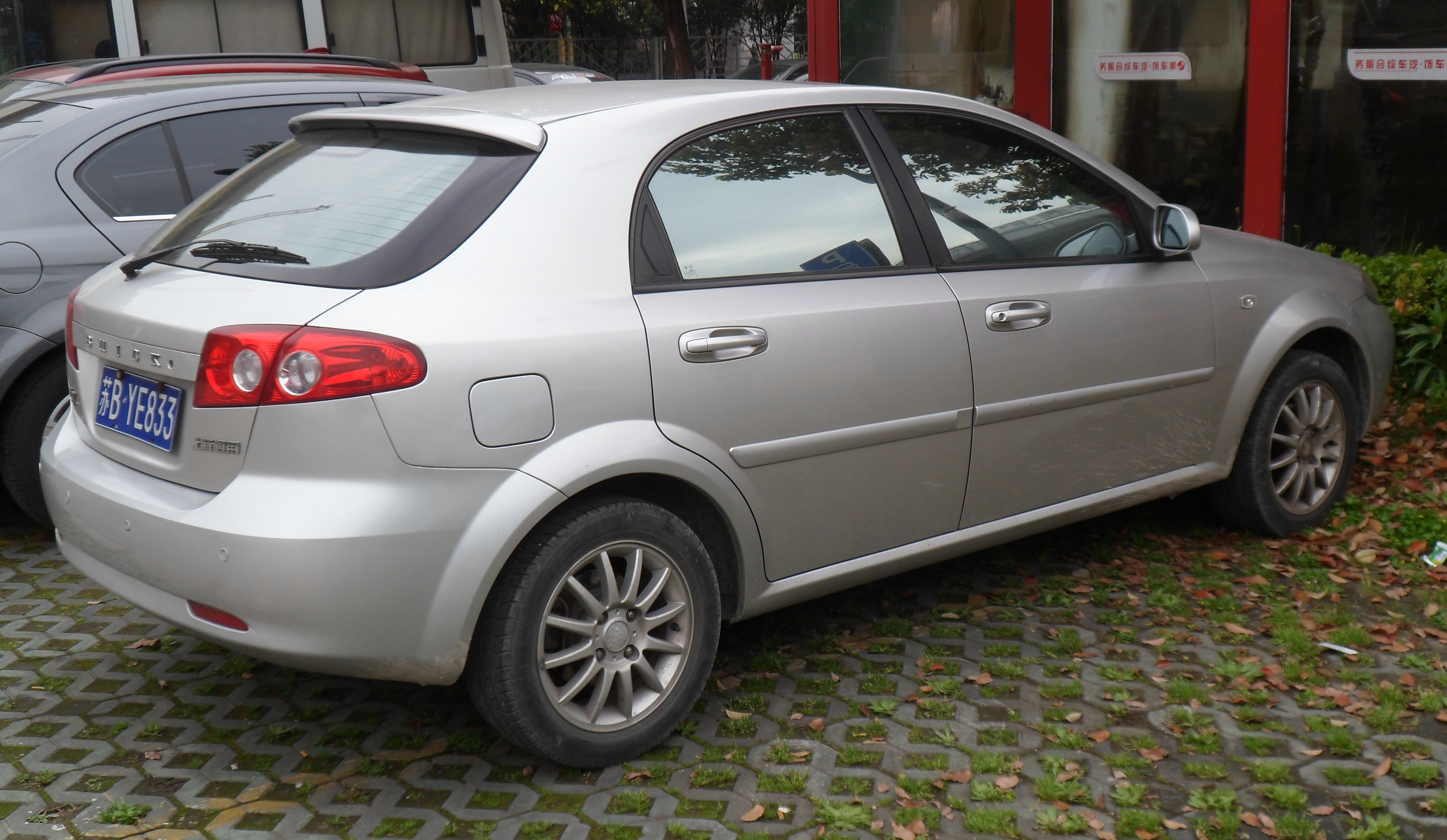
Buick Excelle HRV rear

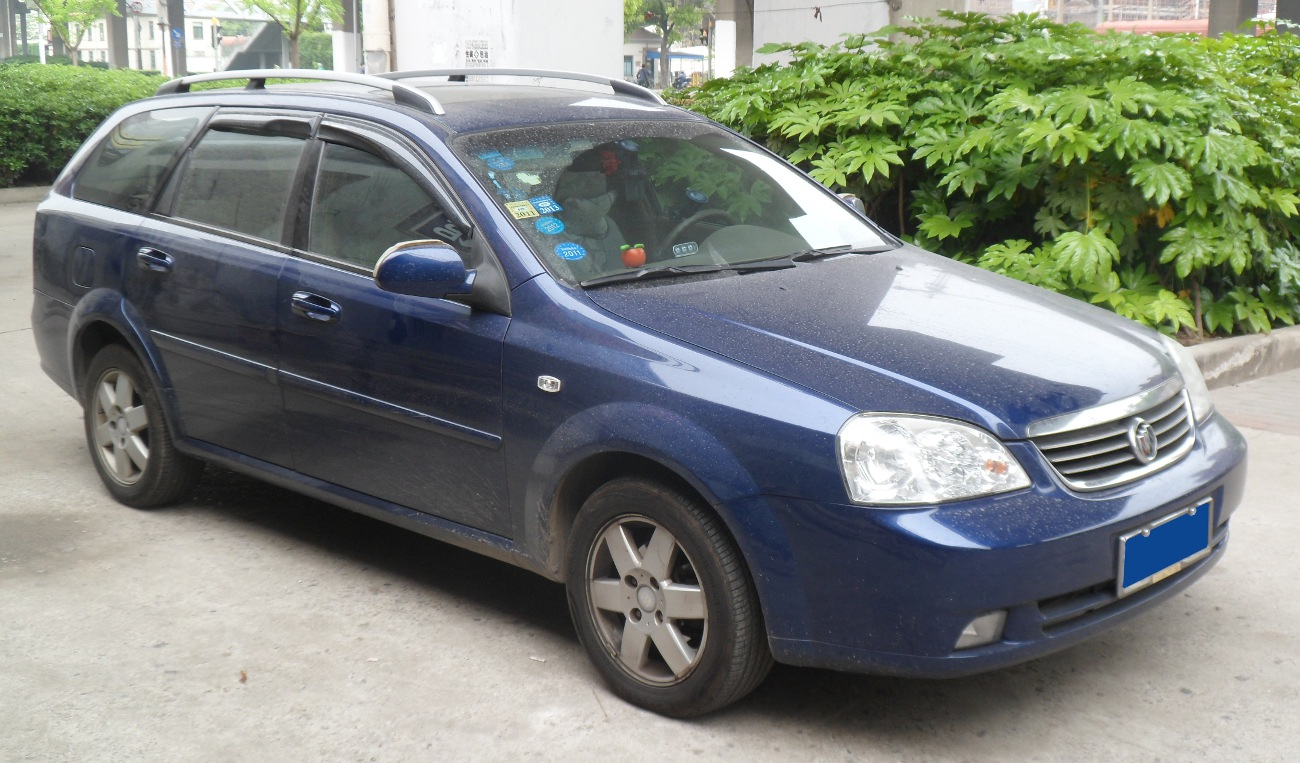
Buick Excelle Wagon front

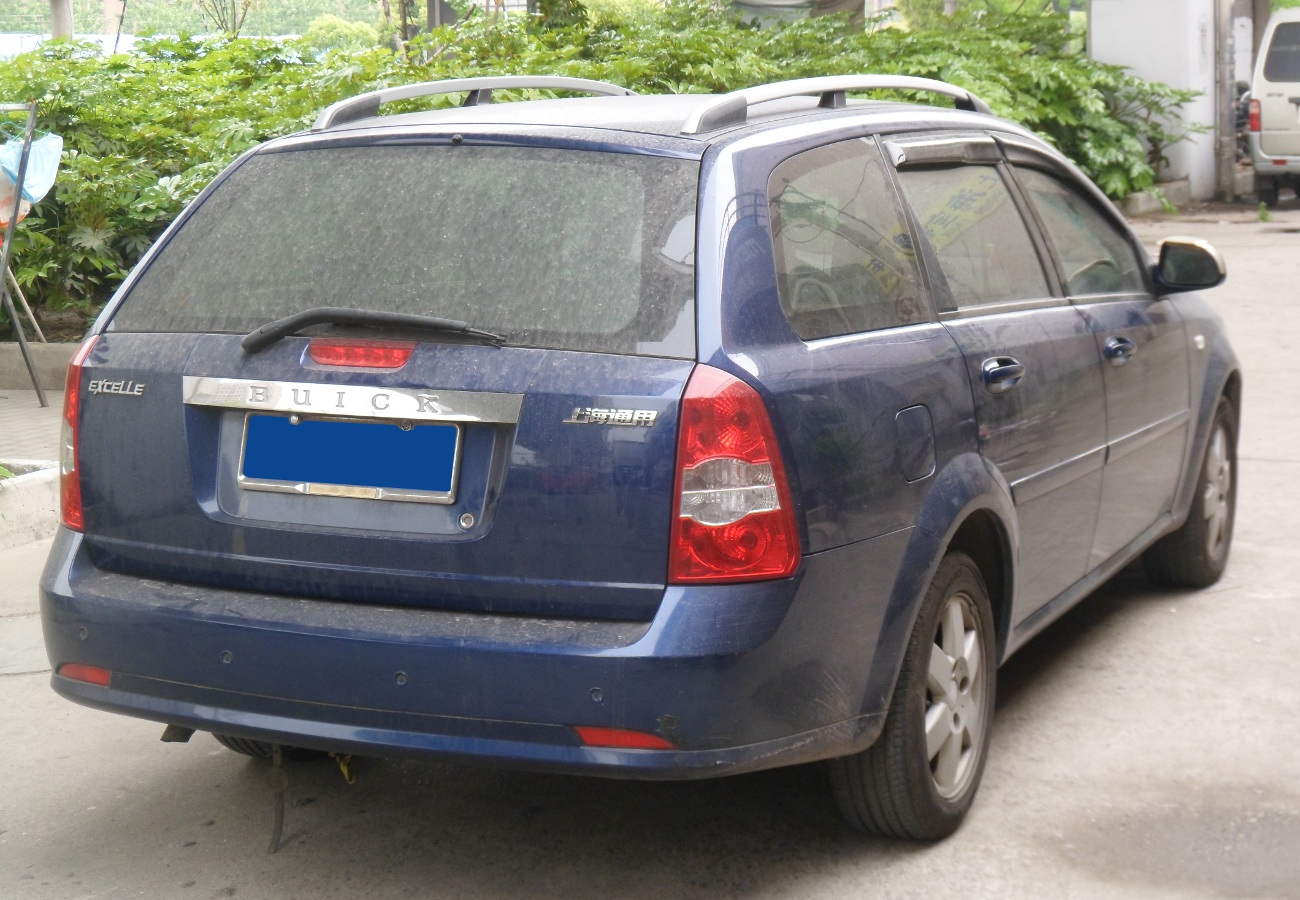
Buick Excelle Wagon rear

=== Taiwan ===
In the Taiwanese market, Yulon Motors, being the manufacturer and distributor of GM products in Taiwan, introduced a redesigned Buick Excelle produced and sold exclusively in Taiwan starting from 2007. As importing from mainland China is impossible due to political issues, the car was imported as a knock-down kit from South Korea and assembled locally in Taiwan. The Taiwanese version consists of a completely different front fascia compared to the version sold in mainland China while the rear is still similar to the Chevrolet Optra, Daewoo Lacetti, and Suzuki Forenza sedans with only the inner taillamp setup being redesigned.

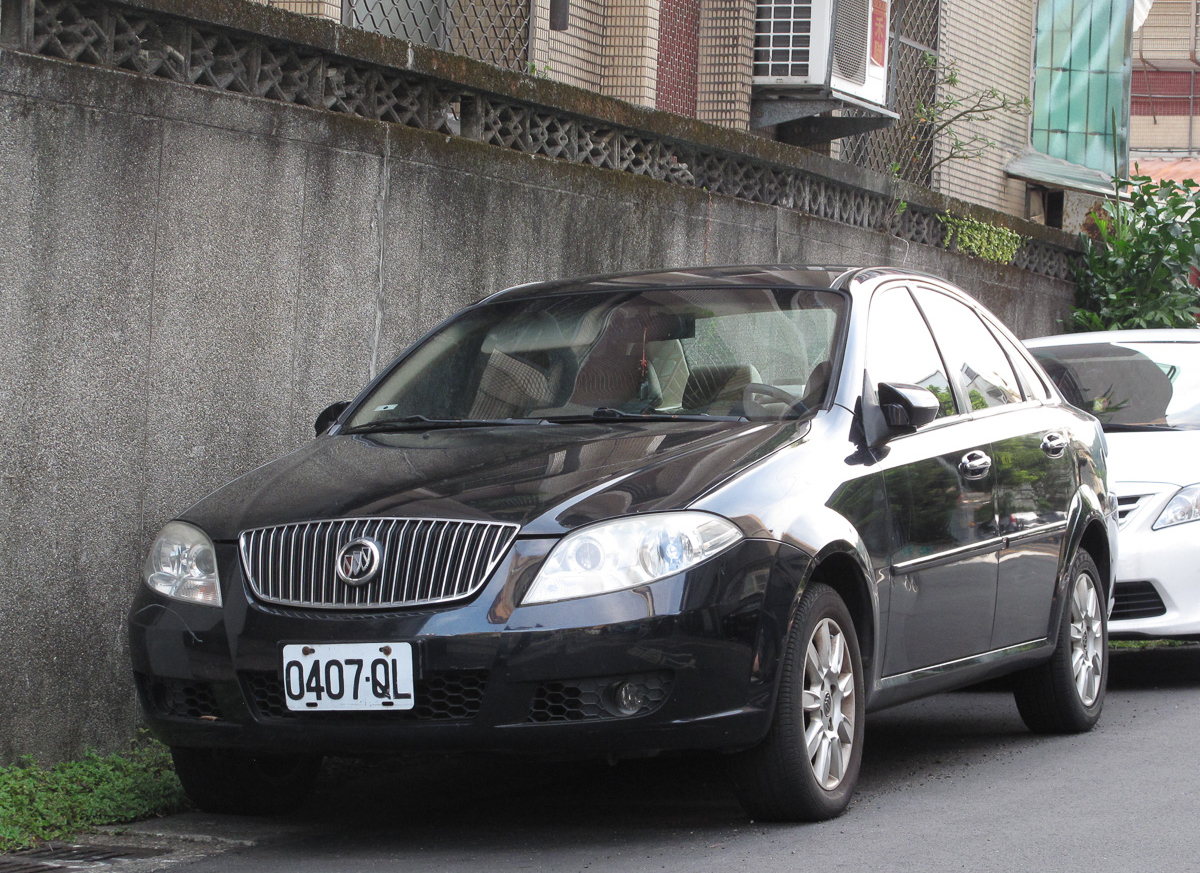
Taiwanese market Buick Excelle

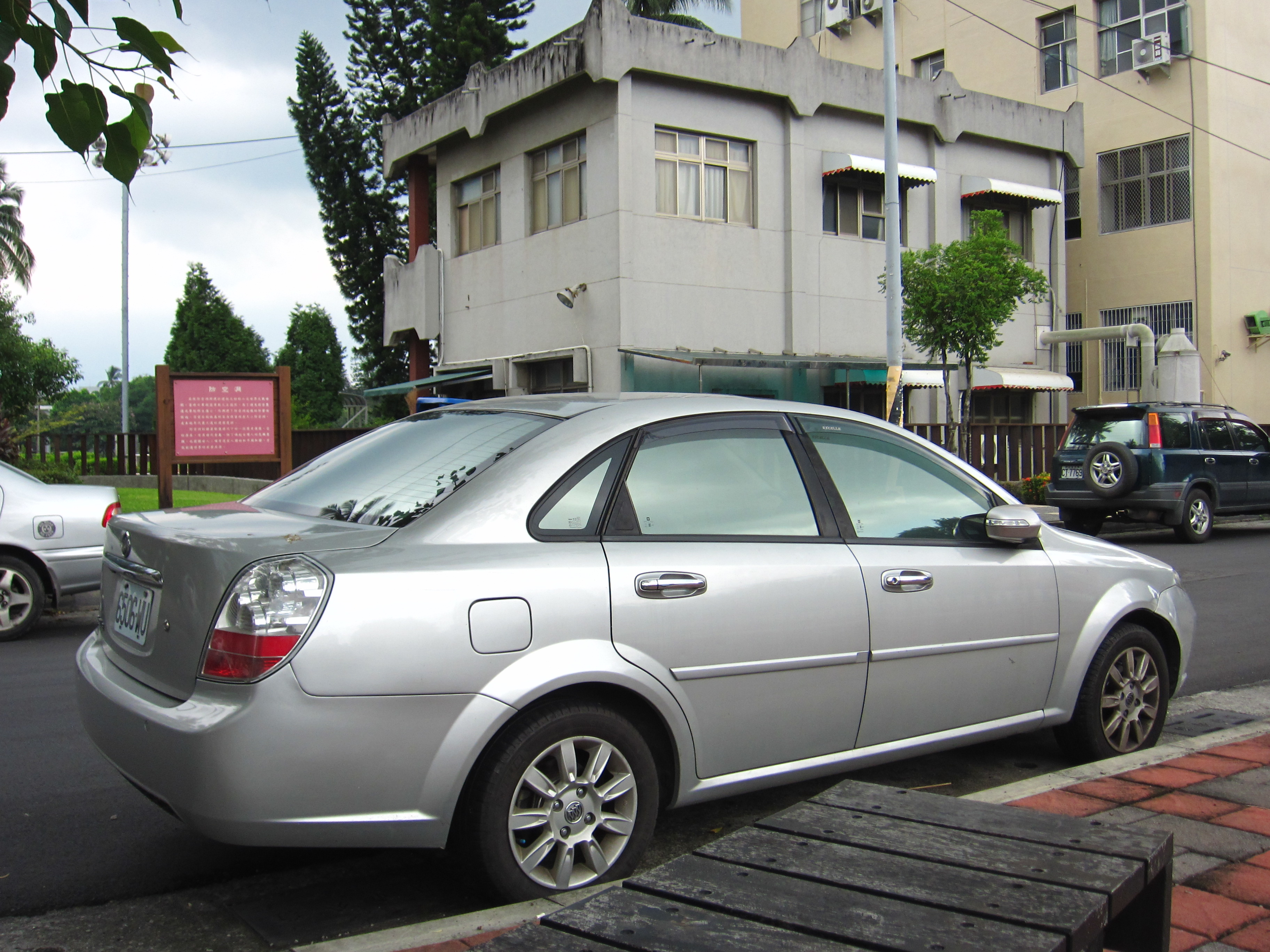
Taiwanese market Buick Excelle rear

== Second generation (2018) ==
Second generation
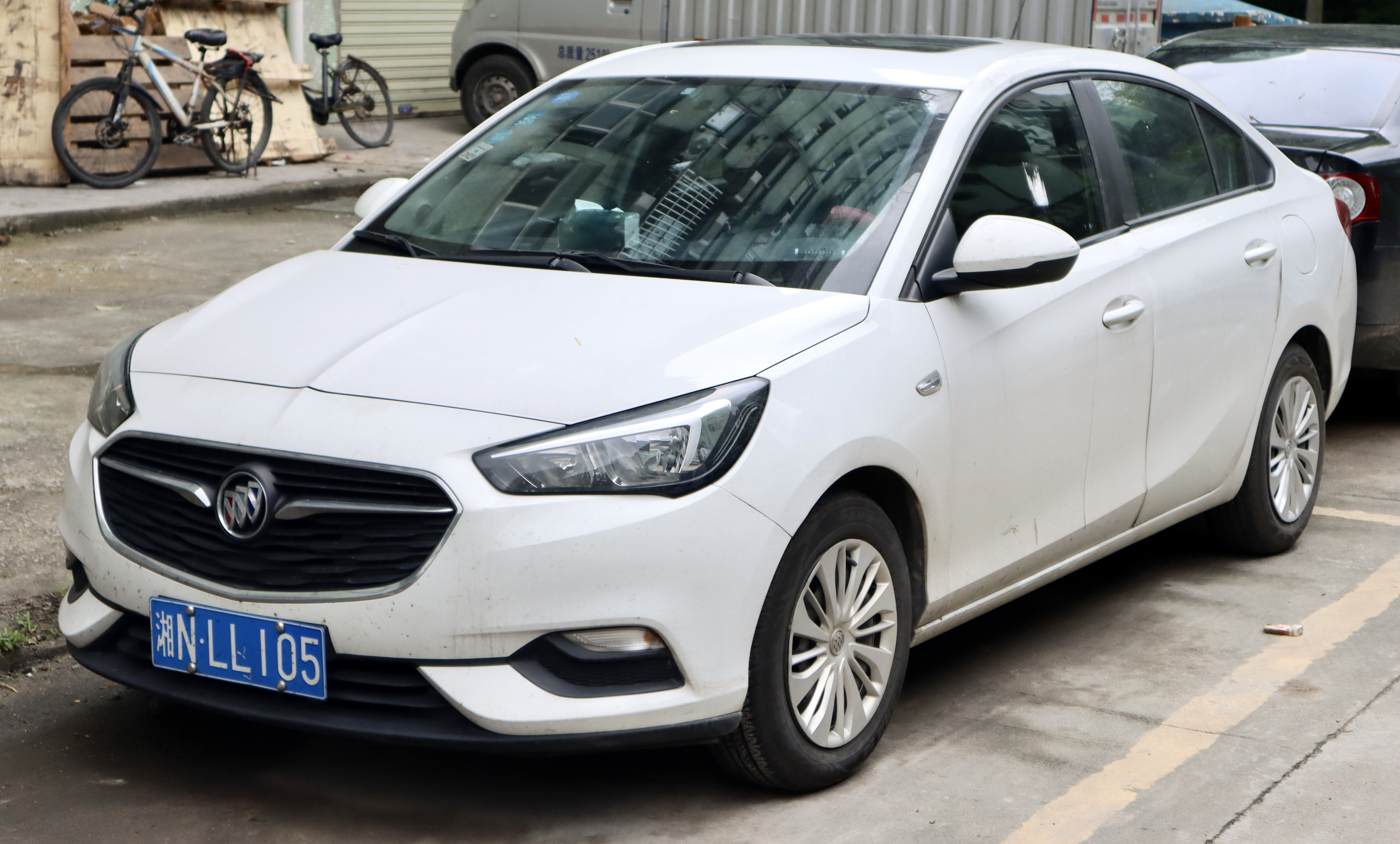

Overview
- Production: 2018–2023
- Assembly: China: Yantai, Shandong (SAIC-GM Dongyue Motors)

Body and chassis
- Body style: 4-door sedan
- Platform: GM GEM platform
- Related: Chevrolet Onix

Powertrain
- Engine: 1.3 L Eighth Generation EcoTec I3
- Transmission: 6-speed manual CVT

Dimensions
- Wheelbase: 2,611 mm (102.8 in)
- Length: 4,468 mm (175.9 in)
- Width: 1,765 mm (69.5 in)
- Height: 1,469 mm (57.8 in)

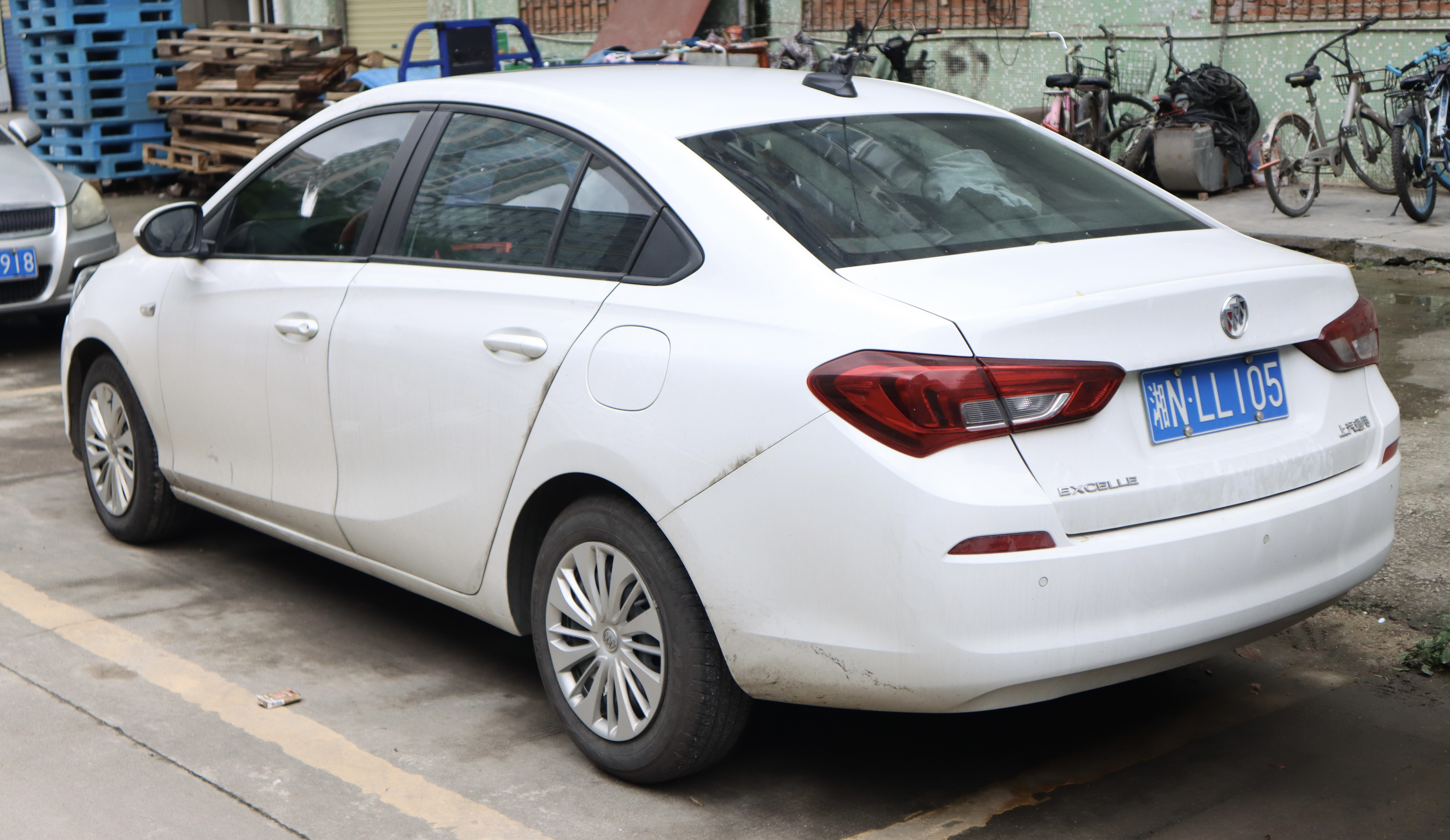
Buick Excelle second generation rear

The second generation Buick Excelle was available in the Chinese market on June 22, 2018, based on the Opel Corsa F (G2J0) project which was cancelled due to Opel being sold to the PSA Group. Based on the all new GEM platform, the second generation Buick Excelle is powered by a new 1.3-litre, dual-injection inline-3 engine producing 79 kW (106 hp; 107 PS) and 133 N⋅m (98 lb⋅ft; 14 kg⋅m) torque. Transmission options include a 6-speed manual and a CVT. As of July 2023, the Excelle is no longer listed on Buick China's website.
