= Chevrolet Joy =

Chevrolet Joy can refer to:

- A rebadge of the Daewoo Matiz, sold in Pakistan from 2005 to 2009; see Chevrolet Spark#Asia
- The renamed first-generation Chevrolet Onix/Prisma, sold in Brazil since 2019 alongside the second-generation Onix
