= Chevrolet Trailblazer (crossover) =

Subcompact crossover SUV

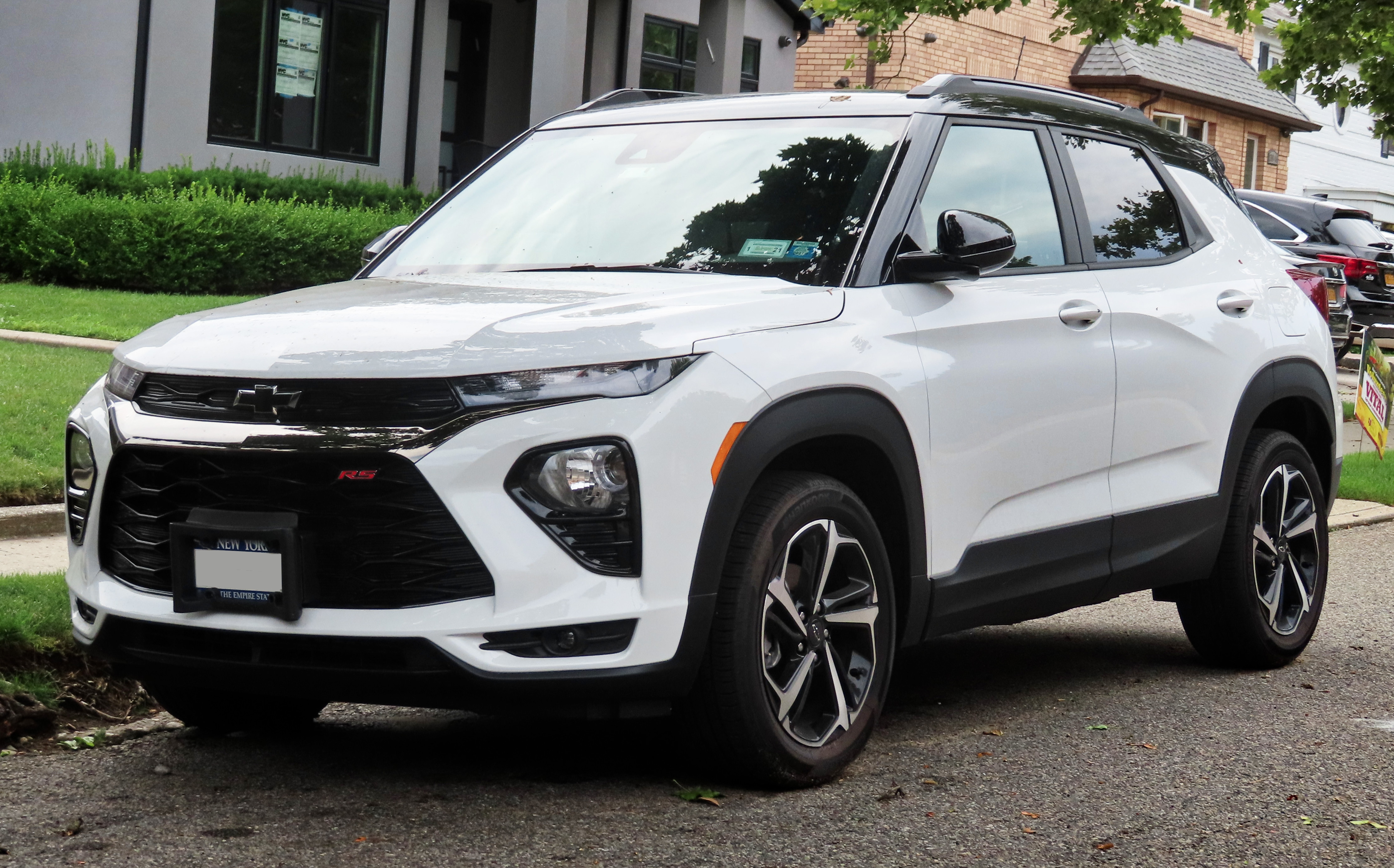
- 2021 Chevrolet Trailblazer RS AWD (US)

Overview
- Manufacturer: General Motors
- Model code: 9BYC
- Production: January 2020 – present
- Model years: 2021–present (North America)
- Assembly: South Korea: Bupyeong-gu, Incheon (GM Korea); China: Yantai, Shandong (SAIC-GM)

Body and chassis
- Class: Subcompact crossover SUV
- Body style: 5-door SUV
- Layout: Front-engine, front-wheel-drive; Front-engine, all-wheel-drive
- Platform: GM VSS-F (9BYC)
- Chassis: Unibody
- Related: Buick Encore GX

Powertrain
- Engine: Gasoline: 1.2 L LIH turbo I3; 1.3 L L3T turbo I3
- Power output: 102 kW (137 hp; 139 PS) (1.2 L); 115.5 kW (155 hp; 157 PS) (1.3 L)
- Transmission: 9-speed GM Hydra-Matic 9T65 automatic (AWD); CVT (FWD)

Dimensions
- Wheelbase: 2,640 mm (103.9 in)
- Length: 4,411–4,425 mm (173.7–174.2 in)
- Width: 1,810 mm (71.3 in)
- Height: 1,633–1,664 mm (64.3–65.5 in)
- Curb weight: 1,359–1,470 kg (2,996.1–3,240.8 lb)

The Chevrolet Trailblazer is a subcompact crossover SUV produced by General Motors under the Chevrolet brand since 2020.

== Overview ==
The Trailblazer was launched on April 16, 2019, at the 18th Shanghai International Automobile Industry Exhibition alongside the Tracker. The Trailblazer is aimed for developed markets, while the Tracker is aimed for emerging markets. Developed by GM Korea, the Trailblazer is assembled in Incheon, South Korea, while the Chinese-market model is produced in Yantai, Shandong, China, by SAIC-GM.

The Trailblazer made its North American debut at the Los Angeles Auto Show in November 2019, and sales began in early 2020 as a 2021 model year vehicle. The Activ and RS models also feature a contrasting color roof. In the North American market the Trailblazer is sold alongside the Trax, another subcompact crossover SUV. Although the Trax is larger, it is not offered with AWD and is priced below the Trailblazer; reports indicated an average transaction price approximately $5,000 lower.

It was launched in the Philippines in October 2021. Imported from South Korea, it notably reused the nameplate from the previous GMT360 platform-based Trailblazer which was discontinued in the same year.

On January 16, 2020, the Trailblazer was launched in South Korea. The Korean-market model is larger in dimension than Trailblazers sold in other markets, with a length of 4,425 mm (174.2 in) and width of 1,810 mm (71.3 in).

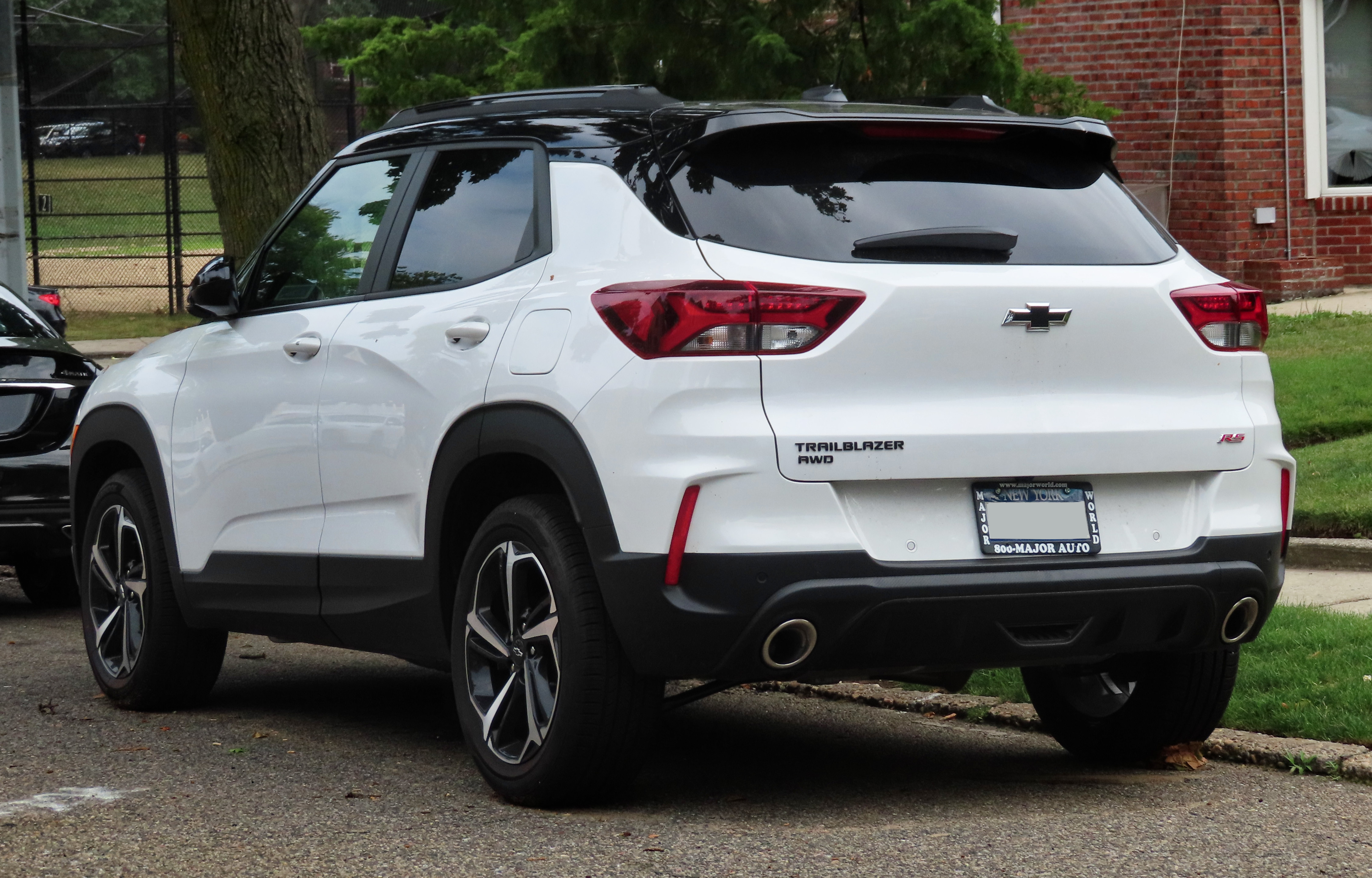
2021 Chevrolet Trailblazer RS AWD (US)

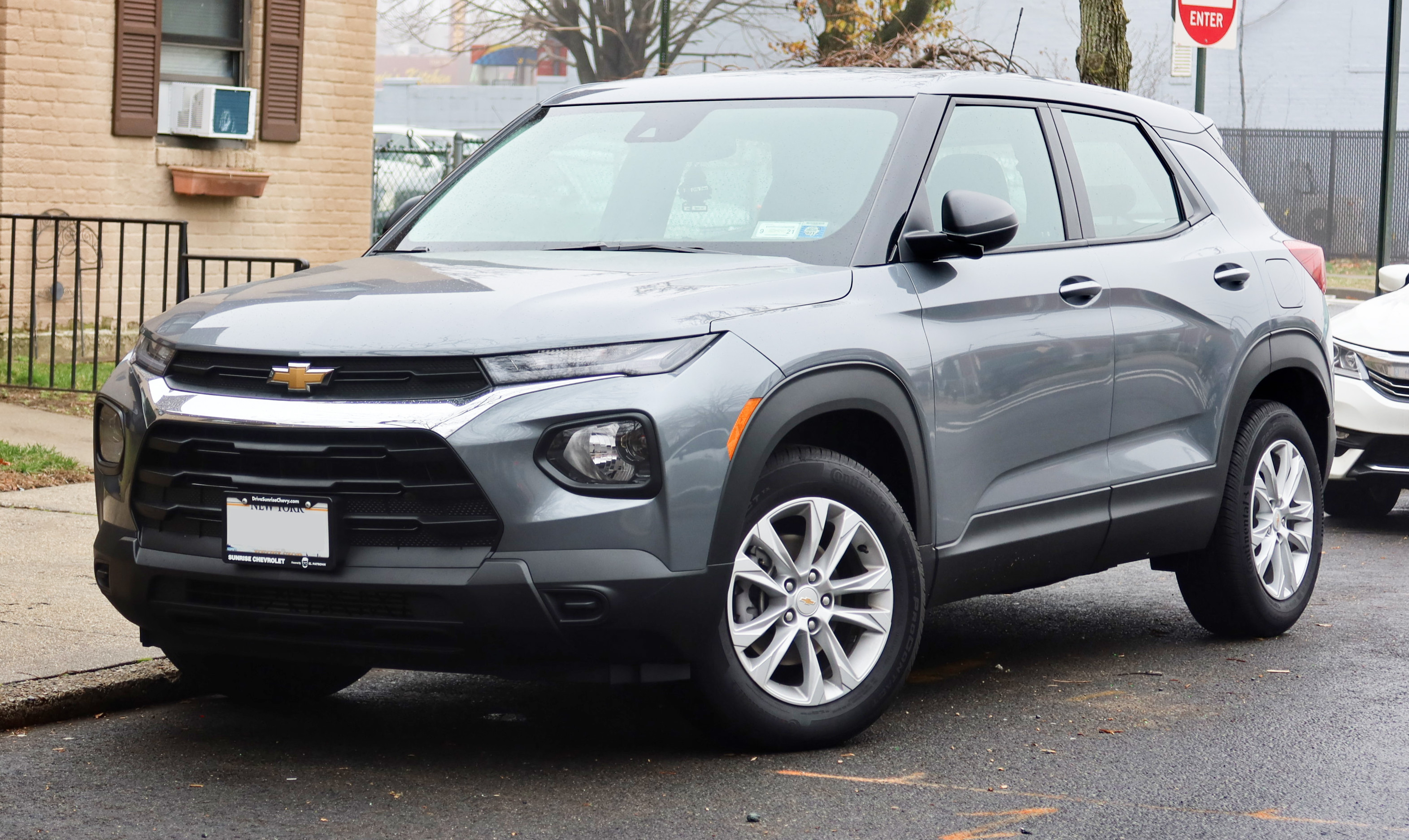
2021 Chevrolet Trailblazer LS AWD (US)

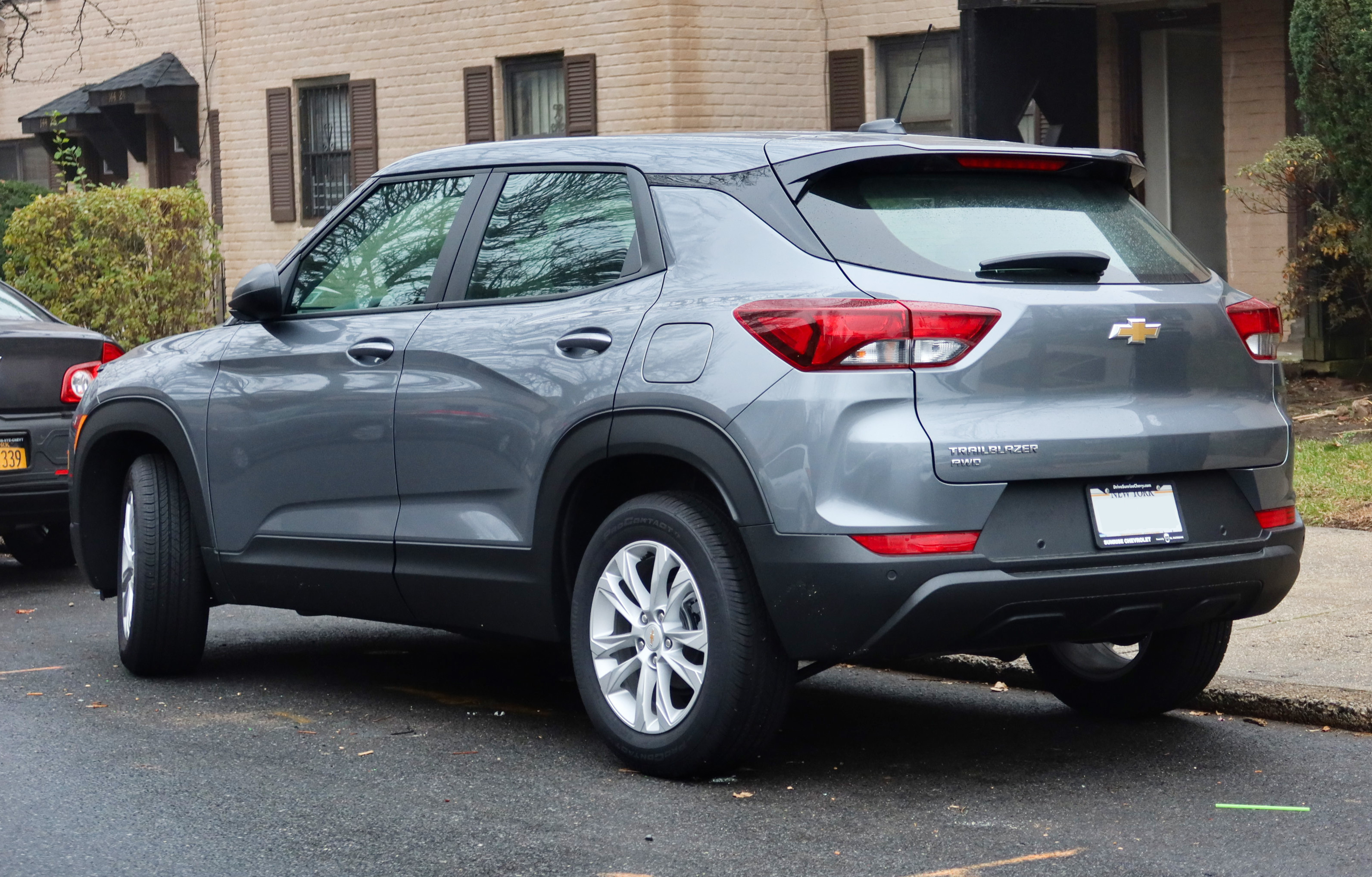
2021 Chevrolet Trailblazer LS AWD (US)

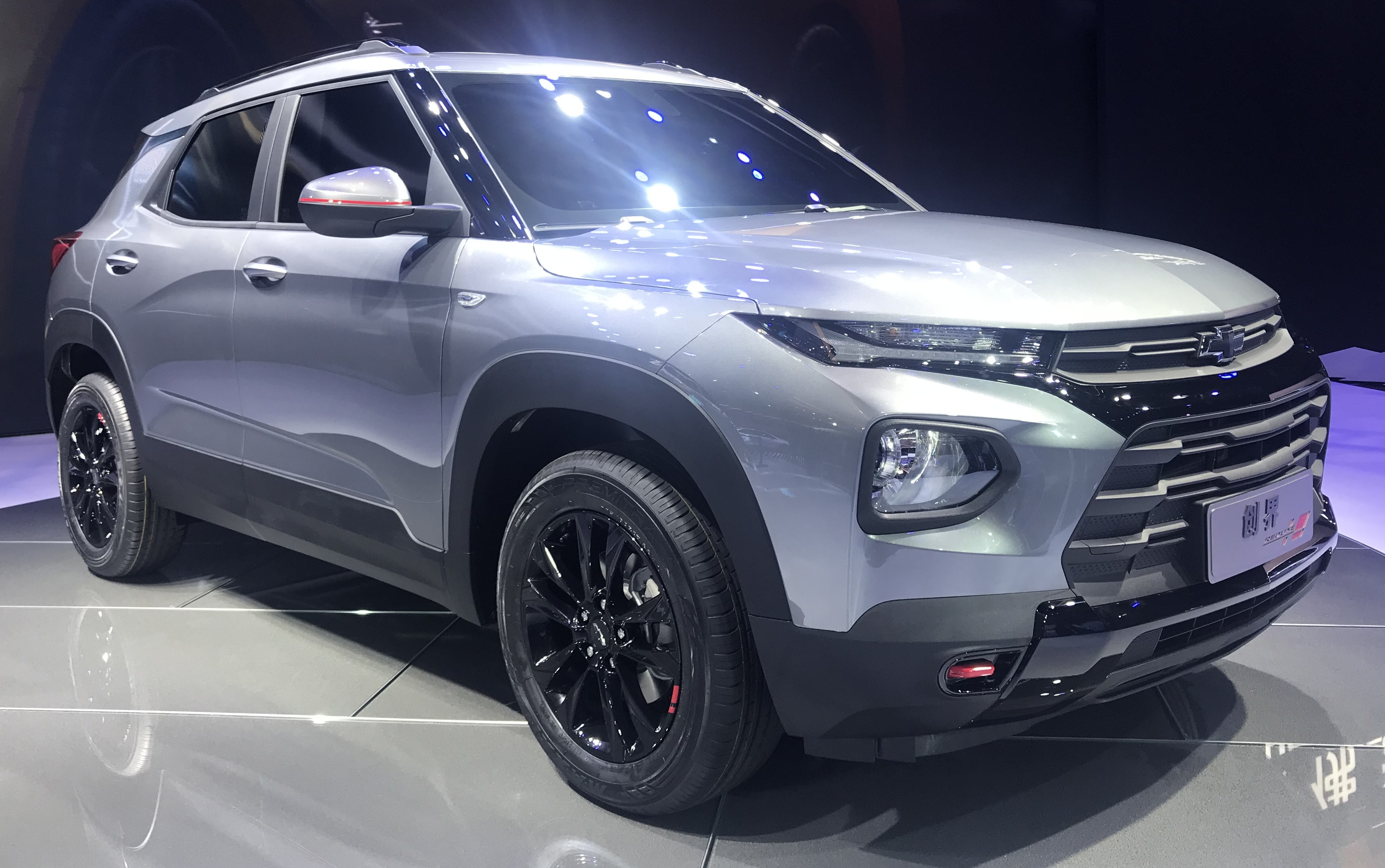
2019 Chevrolet Trailblazer (China)

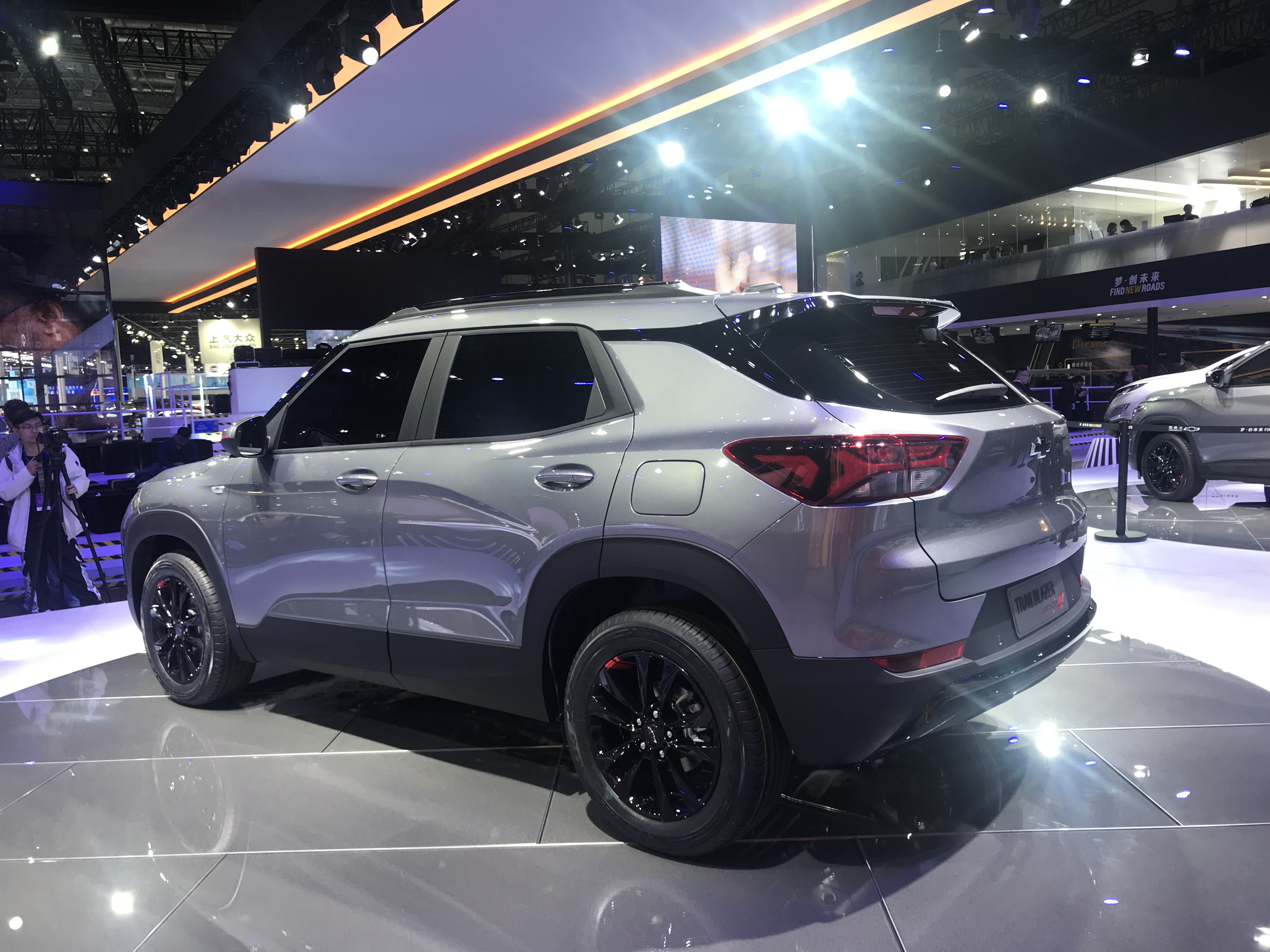
2019 Chevrolet Trailblazer (China)

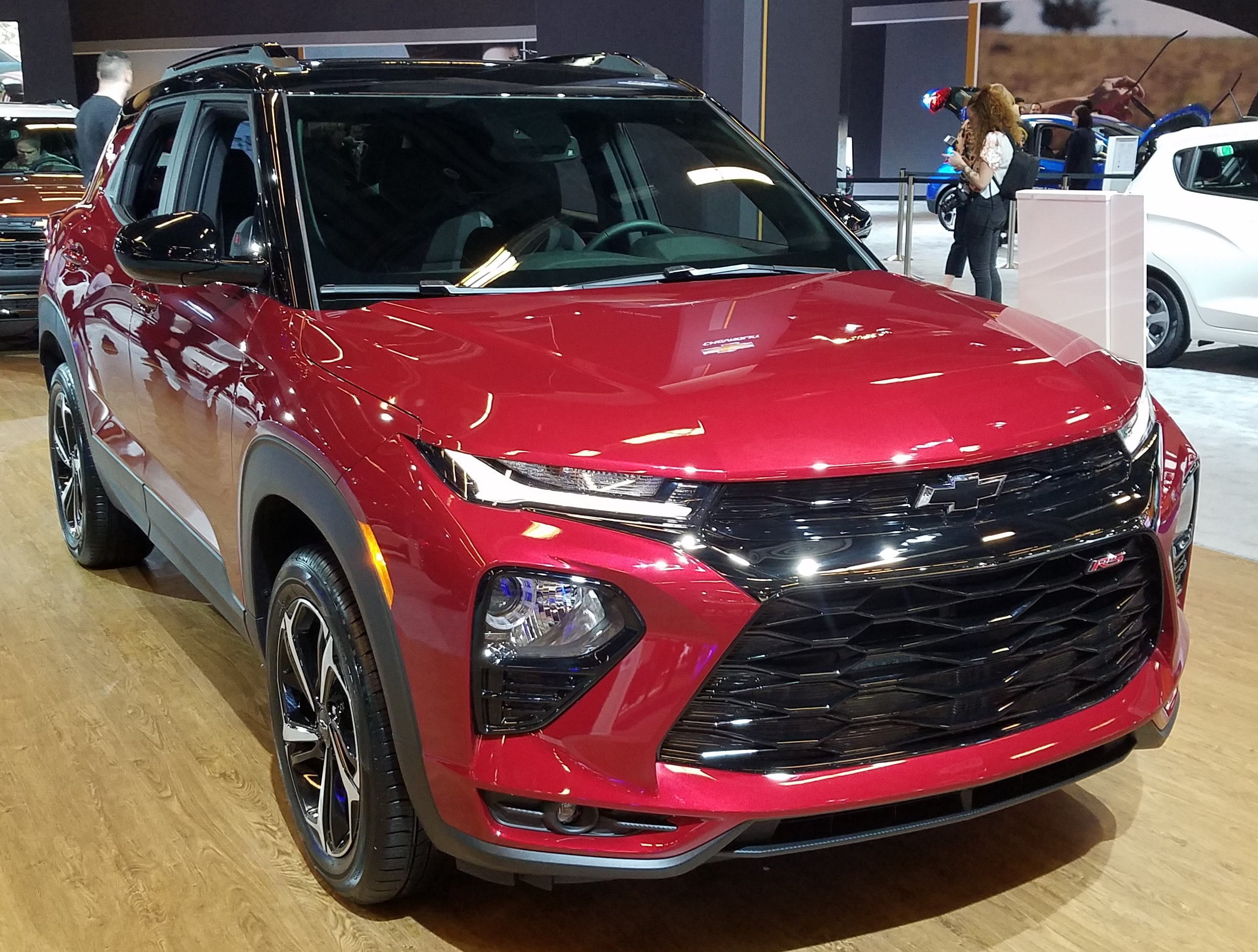
2021 Chevrolet Trailblazer RS (US)

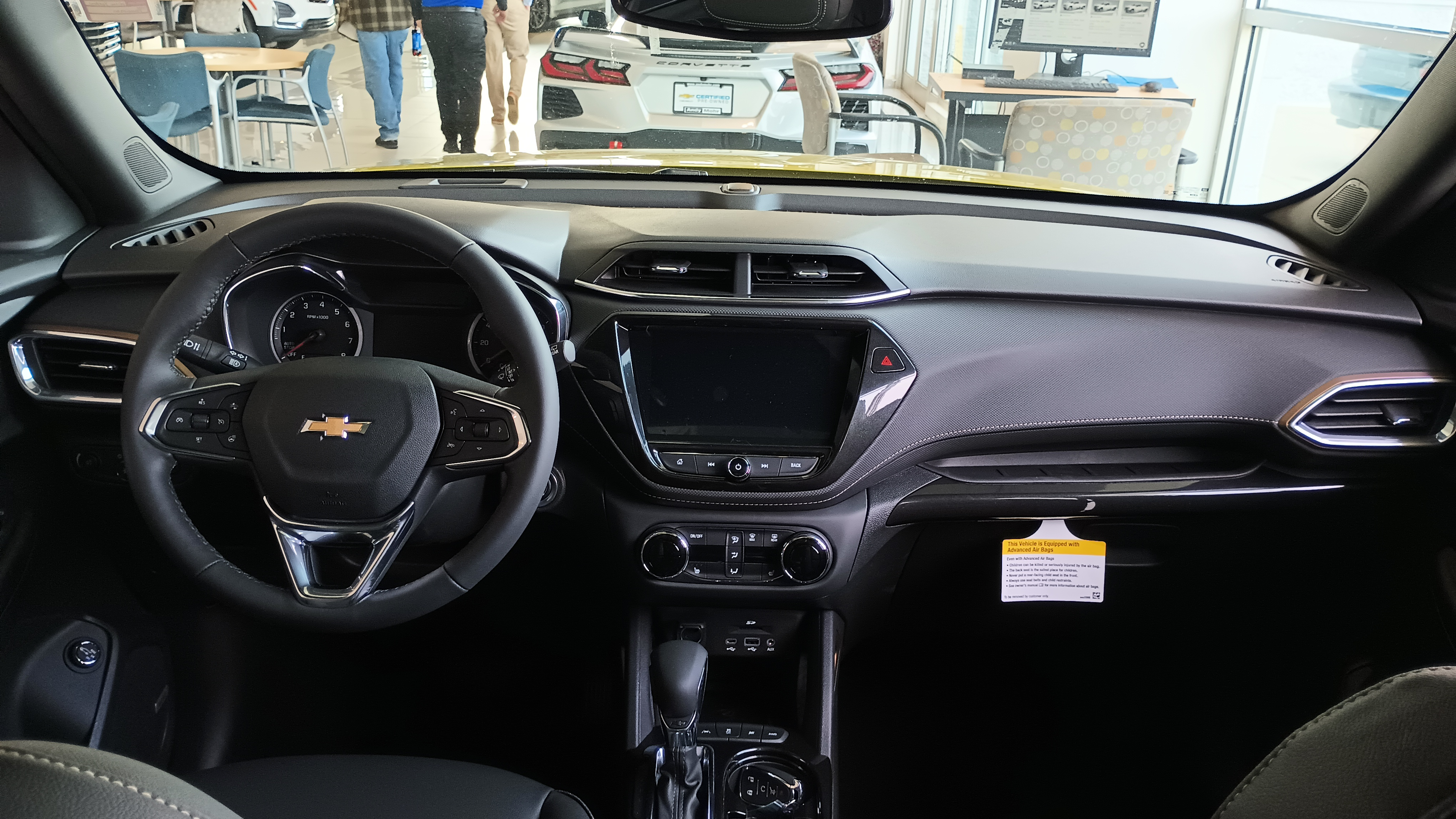
Interior

=== United States ===
In the United States, the 2021 Trailblazer is available in several trim levels: L, LS, LT, ACTIV, and RS. The L, LS, and LT are the "core" models of the Trailblazer lineup, and feature more traditional exterior styling. The ACTIV trim features a more rugged exterior appearance, while the RS trim features a sportier exterior appearance. In addition, the ACTIV and RS trims both offer a two-tone roof option. L, LS, and LT front-wheel-drive models came standard with the 1.2-liter three-cylinder turbocharged gasoline engine, while LS and LT all-wheel-drive models include the larger 1.3-liter three-cylinder turbocharged gasoline engine. The latter is also optional on the LT front-wheel-drive. All RS and Activ models, regardless of drivetrain, include the 1.3-liter engine as standard equipment. All FWD Trailblazers are equipped with continuously variable transmission as standard. AWD versions come with a 9-speed automatic.

=== 2024 refresh ===
The Trailblazer received a facelift in February 2024 for the 2024 model year. Changes include a new front fascia of a curvier design, new front bumper, new running lights, new LED taillights, new exterior colors, new wheel designs, and the interior receives a larger 11-inch touchscreen infotainment system (available with wireless Apple CarPlay and Android Auto) and 8.8-inch digital instrument cluster.

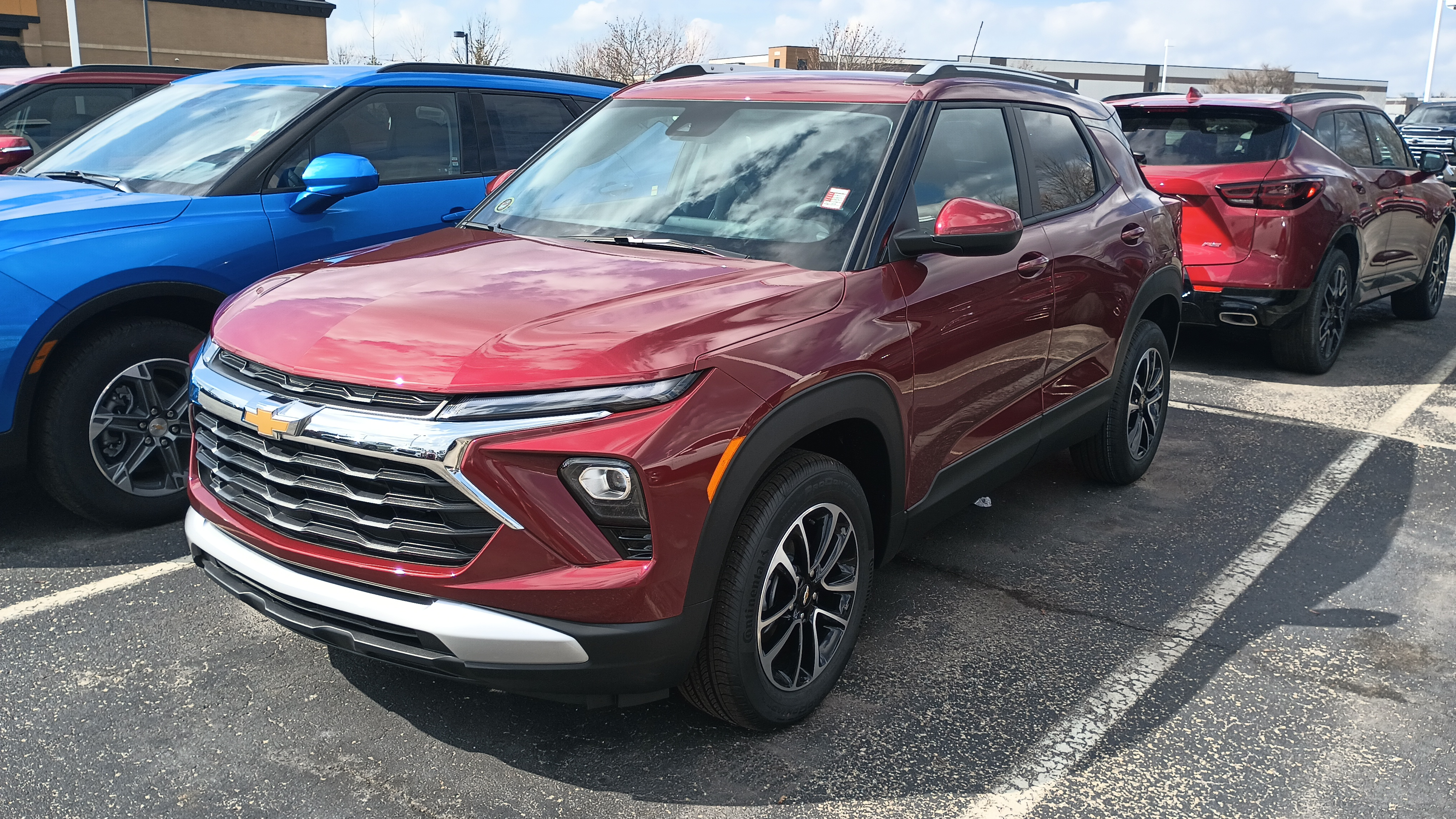
Front view

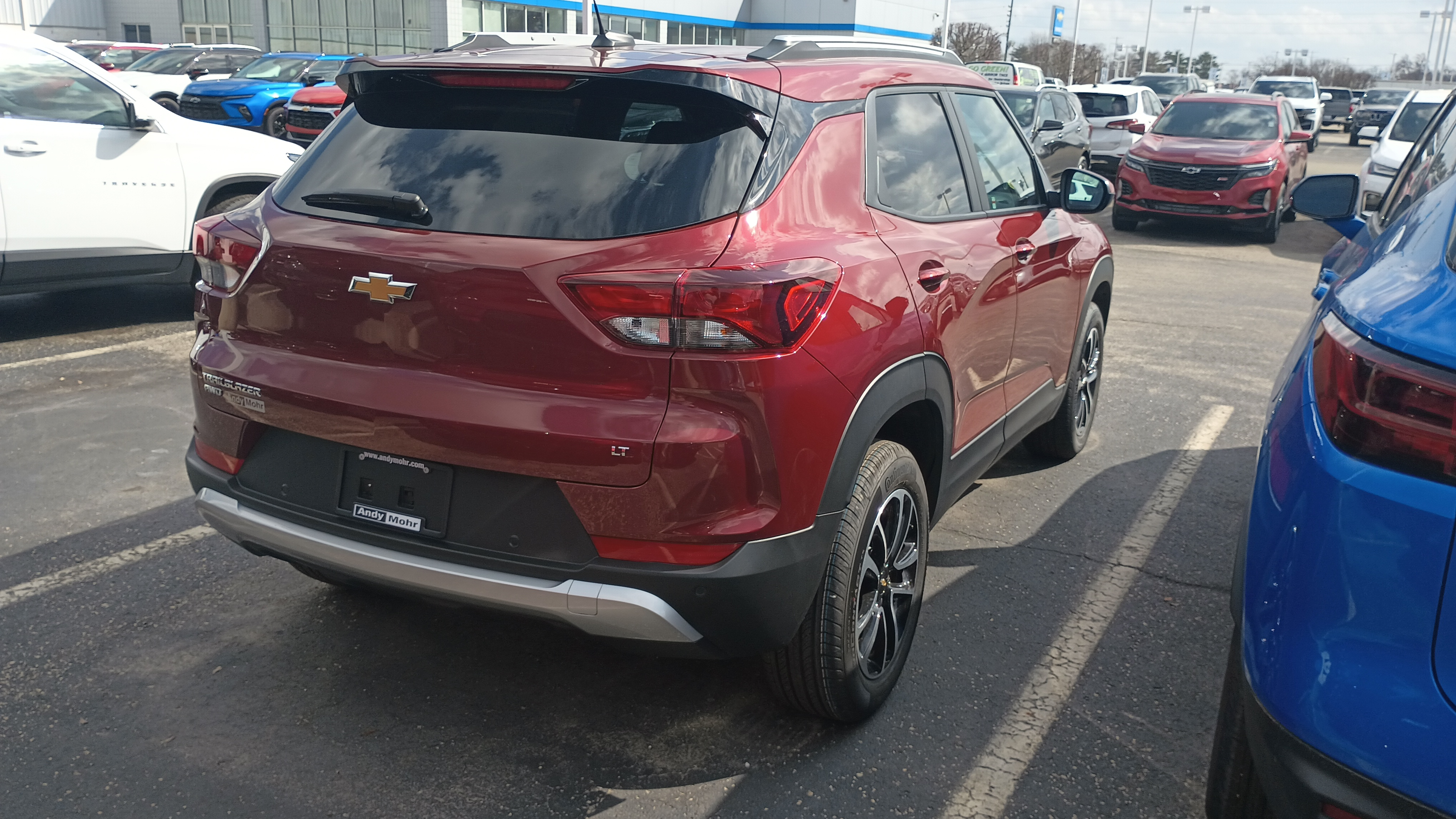
Rear view

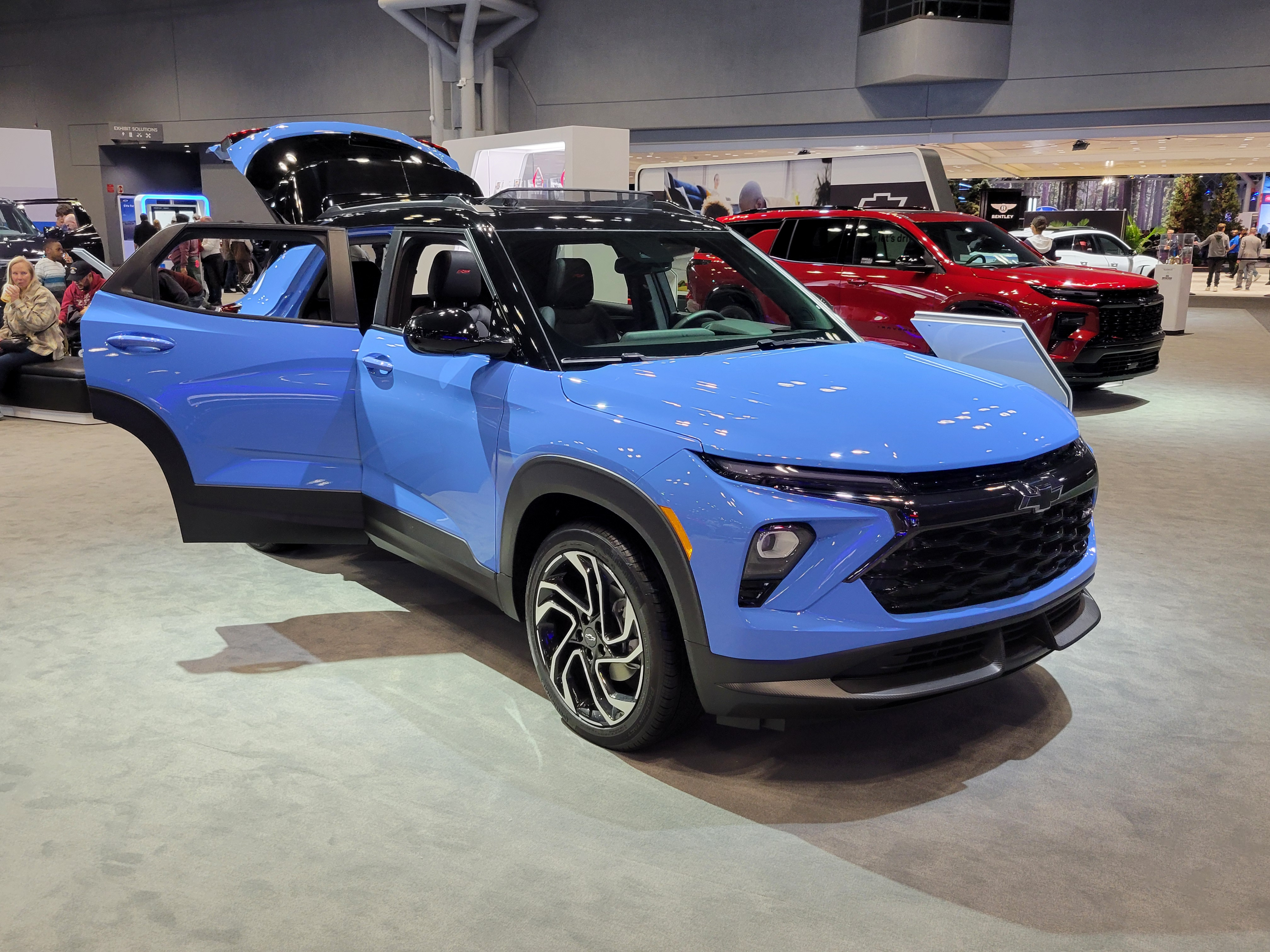
2024 Trailblazer RS

== Safety ==
The 2021 model year Trailblazer was awarded "Top Safety Pick+" by IIHS, as the Trailblazer headlights on all trims received both a Good and Acceptable rating to be qualified for higher-tier safety award.

IIHS scores (2021)
| Small overlap front (driver) | Good | |
| Small overlap front (passenger) | Good | |
| Moderate overlap front (original test) | Good | |
| Side (original test) | Good | |
| Roof strength | Good | |
| Head restraints and seats | Good | |
| Headlights | Good | Acceptable |
| Front crash prevention: vehicle-to-vehicle | Superior | |
| Front crash prevention: vehicle-to-pedestrian (Day) | Advanced | |
| Child seat anchors (LATCH) ease of use | Acceptable | |

== Sales ==
| Calendar year | United States | Canada | South Korea | China |
|---|---|---|---|---|
| 2019 | | | | 3,673 |
| 2020 | 34,292 | 2,487 | 20,887 | 5,460 |
| 2021 | 90,163 | 7,643 | 18,286 | 555 |
| 2022 | 60,888 | 4,448 | 14,561 | |
| 2023 | 111,014 | 11,302 | 7,521 | |
| 2024 | 104,398 | 10,433 | 4,260 | |
| 2025 | 101,363 | 9,567 | 2,509 | |
