= GM CSS Prime engine =

Overview
- Manufacturer: General Motors
- Also called: Ecotec; Prime CSS
- Production: 2019–present

Layout
- Configuration: I3
- Displacement: 999.8 cc (61.01 cu in); 1,199 cc (73.2 cu in)
- Cylinder bore: 74 mm (2.91 in); 75 mm (2.95 in)
- Piston stroke: 77.5 mm (3.05 in); 90.5 mm (3.56 in)
- Cylinder block material: Aluminium alloy
- Cylinder head material: Aluminium alloy
- Valvetrain: DOHC
- Compression ratio: 9.5–12.5:1

Combustion
- Fuel system: Gasoline direct injection; port injection
- Fuel type: Gasoline; Ethanol
- Oil system: Wet sump
- Cooling system: Water-cooled

Chronology
- Predecessor: GM Small Gasoline engine
- Successor: PSA PureTech engine (Opel, Vauxhall)

The GM CSS Prime engine is a family of engines developed by General Motors. All variants are equipped with a wet timing belt. This was the last new engine family developed with input from GM's European division prior to the sale to PSA Group.

== 1.0 L ==
The 1.0-liter inline-3 is a further development of the 1.0-liter GM Small Gasoline engine family. It shares its engine block design with the 1.2-liter variants, but uses different cylinder liners. It has a bore and stroke of 74 mm × 77.5 mm (2.91 in × 3.05 in) for a displacement of 999.8 cc (61.01 cu in).

=== LIJ ===
This CSS Prime variant is used primarily in Latin American markets. It is naturally aspirated and uses port injection, and an ethanol flex-fuel capable variant is offered in the Brazilian market. It uses an oil-immersed timing belt. It has a compression ratio of 12.5:1.

| Year | Model | Power | Torque |
|---|---|---|---|
| 2019–present | Chevrolet Onix | 76 hp (57 kW; 77 PS) @6,400 | 95 N⋅m (70 lb⋅ft) @4,100 |
| 2019–present | Chevrolet Onix (ethanol) | 80 hp (60 kW; 81 PS) @6,400 | 104 N⋅m (77 lb⋅ft) @4,100 |

=== L4G ===
This CSS Prime variant is used primarily in Latin American markets. It is turbocharged and uses port injection, and an ethanol flex-fuel capable variant is offered in the Brazilian market. It uses an oil-immersed timing belt. It has a compression ratio of 10.5:1.

| Year | Model | Power | Torque |
|---|---|---|---|
| 2019–present | Chevrolet Onix | 114 hp (85 kW; 116 PS) @5,500 | 160 N⋅m (118 lb⋅ft) @2,000–4,500 |
| 2019–present | Chevrolet Tracker | 114 hp (85 kW; 116 PS) @5,500 | 160 N⋅m (118 lb⋅ft) @2,000–4,500 |
| 2019–present | Chevrolet Onix (ethanol) | 114 hp (85 kW; 116 PS) @5,500 | 165 N⋅m (122 lb⋅ft) @2,000–4,500 |
| 2019–present | Chevrolet Tracker (ethanol) | 114 hp (85 kW; 116 PS) @5,500 | 165 N⋅m (122 lb⋅ft) @2,000–4,500 |

=== L4F ===
This CSS Prime variant is used primarily in Latin American markets. It is turbocharged and uses direct injection, and an ethanol flex-fuel capable variant is offered in the Brazilian market. It uses an oil-immersed timing belt. It has a compression ratio of 10.5:1.

The L4F in the Chevrolet Onix has a port injection and a reduced compression ratio of 9.5:1 and is only sold in the Argentina market.

In July 2025, the flex-fuel variant was updated to improve fuel efficiency to qualify for Brazil's new IPI Verde sustainable vehicle tax reduction program, and the oil-immersed timing belt was upgraded with a more durable model with an increased warranty of 240,000 km (150,000 mi) compared to the previous 150,000 km (93,000 mi).

| Year | Model | Power | Torque |
|---|---|---|---|
| 2019–present | Chevrolet Onix | 114 hp (85 kW; 116 PS) @5,500 | 160 N⋅m (118 lb⋅ft) @2,000–4,500 |
| 2024–present | Chevrolet Tracker | 115 hp (86 kW; 117 PS) @5,000 | 180 N⋅m (133 lb⋅ft) @1,800–3,500 |
| 2024–25 | Chevrolet Tracker (ethanol) | 119 hp (89 kW; 121 PS) @5,000 | 185 N⋅m (136 lb⋅ft) @1,800–3,500 |
| 2025–present | Chevrolet Tracker (ethanol) | 113 hp (84 kW; 115 PS) @5,000 | 181 N⋅m (133 lb⋅ft) @1,800–3,500 |

== 1.2 L ==
This line of engines is known as the Prime CSS (Cylinder Set Strategy) engines, and is a further development of the 1.1-liter GM Small Gasoline engine family. It shares its engine block design with the 1.0-liter variants, but uses different cylinder liners. It has a bore and stroke of 75 mm × 90.5 mm (2.95 in × 3.56 in).

=== LIF ===
This variant is naturally aspirated and uses port injection with a compression ratio of 10.5:1. It is used in the Argentinian-built Chevrolet Onix.

| Year | Model | Power | Torque |
|---|---|---|---|
| 2019–24 | Chevrolet Onix | 89 hp (66 kW; 90 PS) @6,200 | 115 N⋅m (85 lb⋅ft) @4,400 |

=== L4H ===
The L4H is turbocharged and has port injection, with a compression ratio of 10.5:1 in Brazil and Mexico-built vehicles, and a 9.5:1 compression ratio model used in some markets.

| Year | Model | Power | Torque |
|---|---|---|---|
| 2019–22 | Chevrolet Onix | 130 hp (97 kW; 132 PS) @5,500 | 190 N⋅m (140 lb⋅ft) @2,000–4,500 |
| 2019–present | Chevrolet Tracker | 130 hp (97 kW; 132 PS) @5,500 | 190 N⋅m (140 lb⋅ft) @2,000–4,500 |
| 2019–present | Chevrolet Montana | 130 hp (97 kW; 132 PS) @5,500 | 190 N⋅m (140 lb⋅ft) @2,000–4,500 |

=== L4K ===
The L4K was the first CSS Prime family engine to enter production. It is the direct injected version of the L4H and also has flex-fuel capability. It was originally used by Opel in the Astra with a 10.0:1 compression ratio, while South American variants use a 10.5:1 compression ratio.

South American variants initially used port injection, which was upgraded to direct injection in 2024 to meet emissions regulations.

| Year | Model | Power | Torque |
|---|---|---|---|
| 2019–21 | Opel/Vauxhall Astra | 108 hp (81 kW; 109 PS) @4,500 | 195 N⋅m (144 lb⋅ft) @2,000–3,500 |
| 2019–21 | Opel/Vauxhall Astra | 129 hp (96 kW; 131 PS) @5,500 | 225 N⋅m (166 lb⋅ft) @2,000–3,500 |
| 2019–21 | Opel/Vauxhall Astra | 143 hp (107 kW; 145 PS) @5,500 | 225 N⋅m (166 lb⋅ft) @2,000–3,500 |
| 2020–24 | Chevrolet Tracker (ethanol) | 131 hp (98 kW; 133 PS) @5,500 | 210 N⋅m (155 lb⋅ft) @2,000–4,500 |
| 2020–24 | Chevrolet Montana (ethanol) | 131 hp (98 kW; 133 PS) @5,500 | 210 N⋅m (155 lb⋅ft) @2,000–4,500 |
| 2024–present | Chevrolet Tracker | 137 hp (102 kW; 139 PS) @5,000 | 220 N⋅m (162 lb⋅ft) @2,500–4,000 |
| 2024–present | Chevrolet Montana | 137 hp (102 kW; 139 PS) @5,000 | 220 N⋅m (162 lb⋅ft) @2,500–4,000 |
| 2024–present | Chevrolet Tracker (ethanol) | 139 hp (104 kW; 141 PS) @5,000 | 225 N⋅m (166 lb⋅ft) @2,500–4,000 |
| 2024–present | Chevrolet Montana (ethanol) | 139 hp (104 kW; 141 PS) @5,000 | 225 N⋅m (166 lb⋅ft) @2,500–4,000 |

=== LIH ===
The LIH variant is the North American market version of the L4K.

| Year | Model | Power | Torque |
|---|---|---|---|
| 2020–present | Buick Encore GX | 137 hp (102 kW; 139 PS) @5,000 | 219 N⋅m (162 lb⋅ft) @2,500 |
| 2021–present | Chevrolet Trailblazer | 137 hp (102 kW; 139 PS) @5,000 | 219 N⋅m (162 lb⋅ft) @2,500 |
| 2024–present | Buick Envista | 137 hp (102 kW; 139 PS) @5,000 | 219 N⋅m (162 lb⋅ft) @2,500 |
| 2024–present | Chevrolet Trax | 137 hp (102 kW; 139 PS) @5,000 | 219 N⋅m (162 lb⋅ft) @2,500 |

=== LBP ===
The LBP is the E85 flex-fuel variant of the LIH exclusively for the US market.

| Year | Model | Power | Torque |
|---|---|---|---|
| 2025–present | Buick Encore GX | 137 hp (102 kW; 139 PS) @5,000 | 219 N⋅m (162 lb⋅ft) @2,500 |
| 2025–present | Buick Envista | 137 hp (102 kW; 139 PS) @5,000 | 219 N⋅m (162 lb⋅ft) @2,500 |
| 2025–present | Chevrolet Trailblazer | 137 hp (102 kW; 139 PS) @5,000 | 219 N⋅m (162 lb⋅ft) @2,500 |
| 2025–present | Chevrolet Trax | 137 hp (102 kW; 139 PS) @5,000 | 219 N⋅m (162 lb⋅ft) @2,500 |
