= Buick Envista =

Subcompact crossover SUV

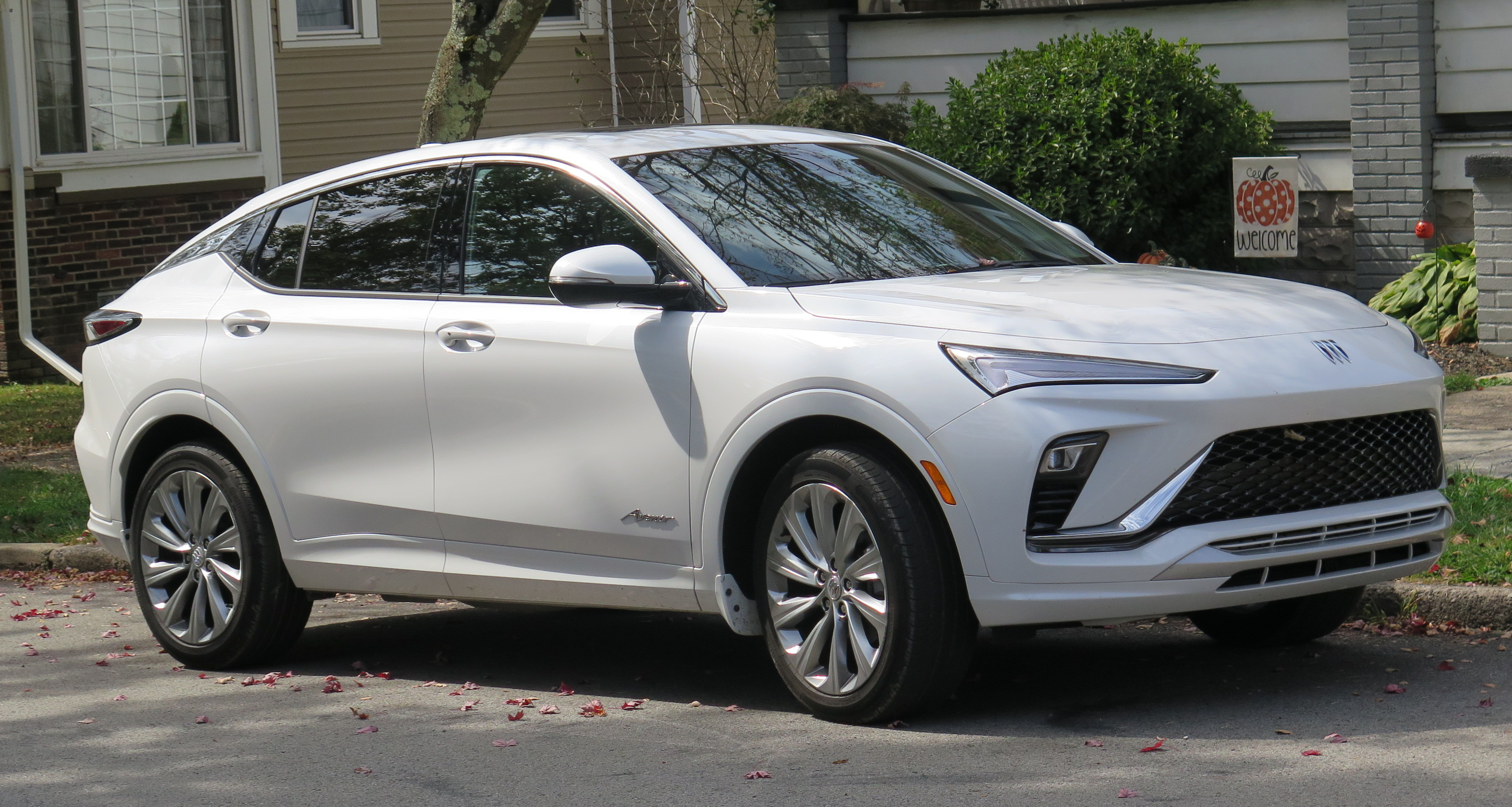
- 2025 Buick Envista

Overview
- Manufacturer: General Motors
- Model code: 9BQB
- Production: 2023–present (South Korea); 2022–2025 (China)
- Model years: 2024–present (North America)
- Assembly: China: Shenyang (SAIC-GM); South Korea: Bupyeong-gu, Incheon (GM Korea)

Body and chassis
- Class: Subcompact crossover SUV
- Body style: 5-door coupe SUV
- Layout: Front-engine, front-wheel-drive
- Platform: GM VSS-F (9BXX)
- Related: Chevrolet Trax (2nd gen.); Chevrolet Seeker

Powertrain
- Engine: Gasoline: 1.2 L LIH turbo I3; 1.5 L LYX turbo I4 (China)
- Transmission: 6-speed automatic; CVT (China)

Dimensions
- Wheelbase: 2,700 mm (106.3 in)
- Length: 4,638 mm (182.6 in)
- Width: 1,816 mm (71.5 in)
- Height: 1,565 mm (61.6 in)
- Curb weight: 1,374–1,435 kg (3,030–3,163 lb)

Chronology
- Predecessor: Buick Encore (North America)

The Buick Envista is a subcompact crossover SUV with a fastback design manufactured by General Motors and marketed under the Buick brand since 2022 for the model years 2023 onward, 2024 for North America. It shares the GM VSS-F platform with the Chevrolet Trax (marketed as the Seeker in China).

Presented for the Chinese market in August 2022, GM introduced the Envista in April 2023 in the United States and Canada. The Envista is manufactured in Changwon, South Korea by GM Korea and in China by SAIC-GM.

== Overview ==
In China, the Envista is equipped with the GM small gasoline engine (LYX), a turbocharged 1.5-liter gasoline straight-four engine that produces 181 horsepower (135 kW) and 183 pound-feet (248 N⋅m) of torque paired with a continuously variable transmission.

In the North American market, the Envista is powered by the GM E-Turbo engine (LIH), a turbocharged 1.2-liter gasoline straight-three engine rated at 137 horsepower (102 kW) and 162 pound-feet (220 N⋅m) of torque mated to a six-speed automatic transmission. The Envista is offered in three trim levels: Preferred, Sport Touring (ST) and Avenir, each with front-wheel drive.

Front suspension uses MacPherson struts and rear suspension uses a compound crank semi-independent twist beam (or torsion beam) rear suspension with a Watts linkage standard on the Avenir trim and available on ST.

The interior of the Envista features a single panel combining an 8-inch screen for driver instruments and an 11-inch infotainment screen. Wireless Android Auto and Apple CarPlay are offered, as well as over-the-air updates and a surround-sound audio system. The front door panels and dashboard feature stitched elements, and the Avenir and ST trim levels feature embroidered head restraints logos.

Black 18-inch alloy wheels are standard on the ST trim, with 19-inch wheels available. Bright gray 19-inch alloy wheels are standard on the Avenir.

The Envista has an EPA listed passenger volume of 97.5 cu ft (2.76 m^{3}) and maximum cargo volume of 20.7 cu ft (0.59 m^{3}) behind the rear seat and 42 cu ft (1.2 m^{3}) with the rear seat folded.

Envista was removed from the Buick China website in March 2025.

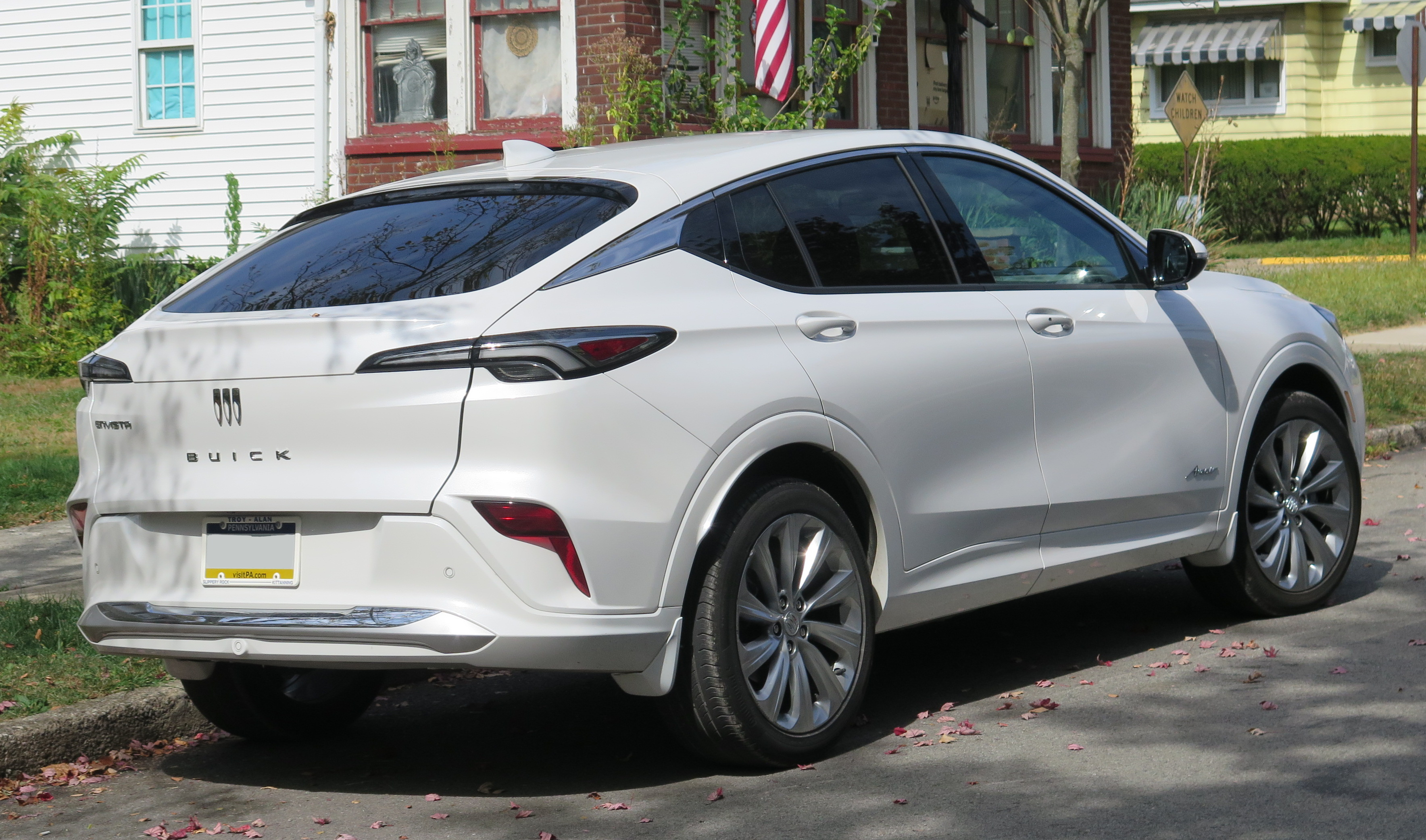
Rear view

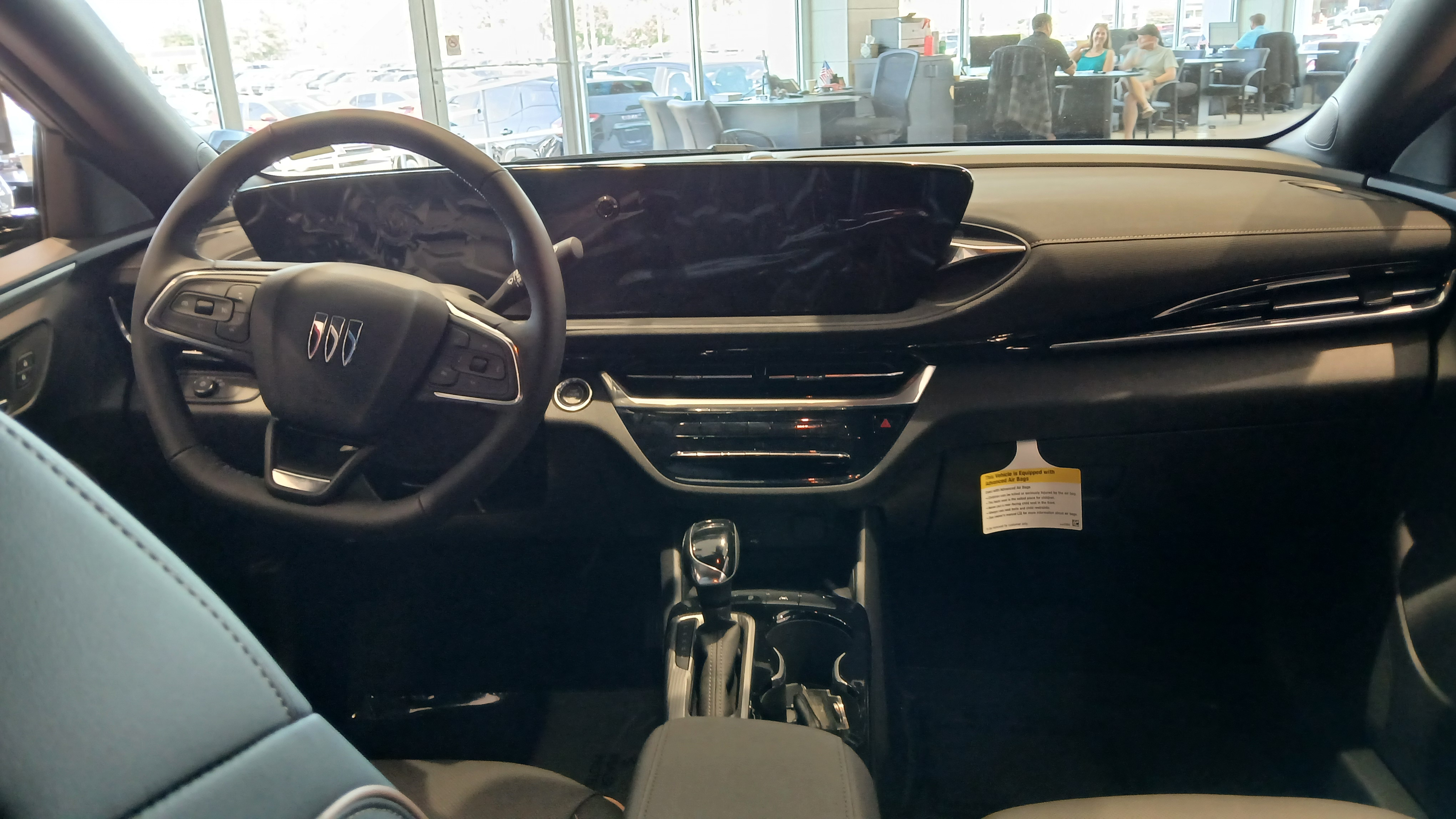
Interior

== Sales ==
Year	China	United States	Canada
2022	2,274		
2023	3,811	13,301	1,385
2024	437	51,316	6,738
2025		58,949	8,001
