= Chevrolet Onix =

Subcompact car produced by GM Brazil

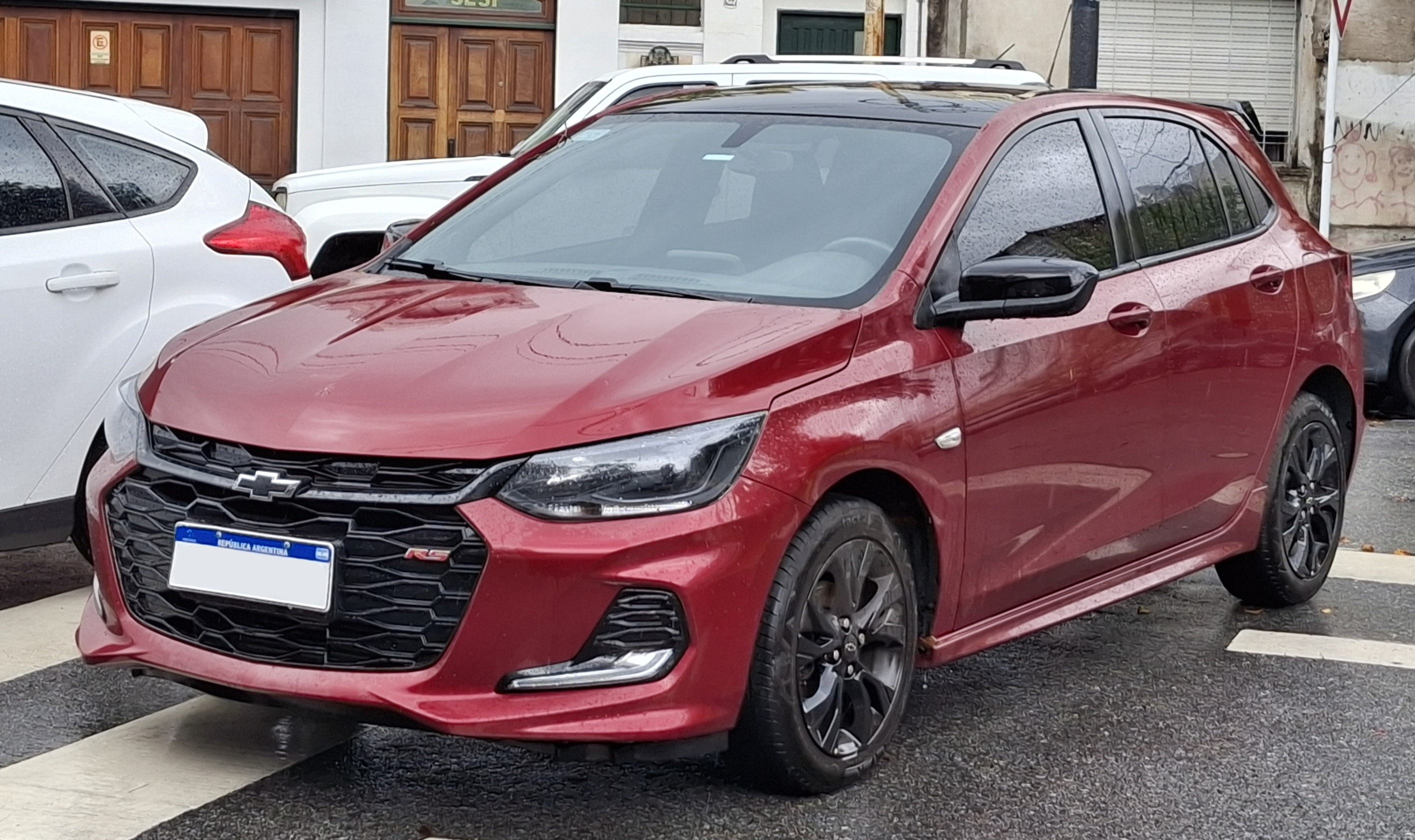
- Second generation Onix RS hatchback

Overview
- Manufacturer: General Motors
- Production: 2012–present

Body and chassis
- Class: Subcompact car
- Layout: Front-engine, front-wheel-drive

Chronology
- Predecessor: Chevrolet Agile; Chevrolet Corsa; Chevrolet Celta; Chevrolet Prisma (sedan)

The Chevrolet Onix is a subcompact car marketed by Chevrolet. It was launched to replace the Chevrolet Corsa and some versions of the Chevrolet Celta. Mainly produced at General Motors Brazil's plants in Gravataí and São Caetano do Sul, the Onix is available in five-door hatchback and four-door sedan body styles. The sedan version is sold as the Chevrolet Onix Plus in Brazil and as the Onix Sedan in Colombia, while in Mexico the sedan is the only model offered. The Onix has also been assembled in Uzbekistan since 2022 by UzAuto Motors.

== First generation (2012) ==
First generation
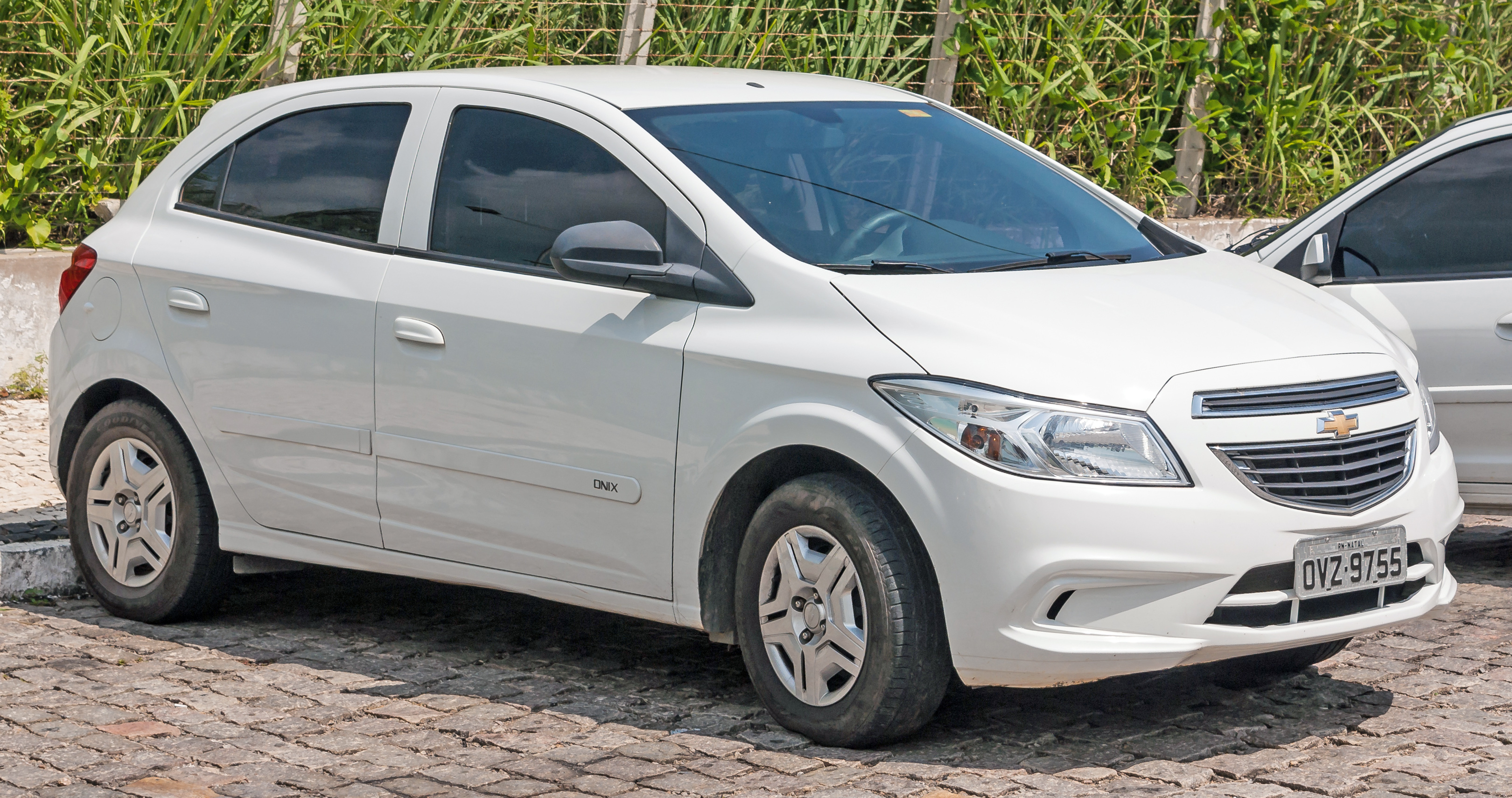
- 2013 Chevrolet Onix

Overview
- Also called: Chevrolet Prisma (sedan, 2012–2019); Chevrolet Joy (hatchback, 2016–2024); Chevrolet Joy Plus (sedan, 2019–2024)
- Production: 2012–2024
- Assembly: Brazil: Gravataí, Rio Grande do Sul; São Caetano do Sul, São Paulo (GM Brazil: 2012–2023); Colombia: Bogotá (GM Colmotores: 2023–2024)

Body and chassis
- Body style: 5-door hatchback; 4-door sedan (Prisma)
- Platform: GM Gamma II

Powertrain
- Engine: 1.0 L SPE/4 I4 flex fuel; 1.4 L SPE/4 I4 flex fuel
- Transmission: 5-speed manual; 6-speed manual; 6-speed 6T40 automatic

Dimensions
- Wheelbase: 2,528 mm (99.5 in)
- Length: 3,930–3,958 mm (154.7–155.8 in); 4,275–4,282 mm (168.3–168.6 in) (Prisma)
- Width: 1,705 mm (67.1 in); 1,737 mm (68.4 in) (Activ)
- Height: 1,474–1,484 mm (58.0–58.4 in); 1,497 mm (58.9 in) (Activ)
- Curb weight: 1,008–1,119 kg (2,222–2,467 lb)

The first-generation Onix was available in three trim levels (LS, LT, and LTZ) with two four-cylinder engines: a 1.0-litre producing 78 PS (57 kW; 77 bhp) (petrol) or 80 PS (59 kW; 79 bhp) (ethanol), and a 1.4-litre producing 98 PS (72 kW; 97 bhp) (petrol) or 106 PS (78 kW; 105 bhp) (ethanol), available with automatic or five-speed manual transmission. In Brazil, the four-door sedan variant was known as the Chevrolet Prisma.

For 2016, the Onix and Prisma received a facelift along with interior improvements. A touchscreen was added with Android Auto and Apple CarPlay support. A crossover-styled variant called the Onix Activ was also introduced, with raised suspension, plastic body cladding, and a roof rack.

In late 2019, the Onix and Prisma were replaced in Brazil by the second-generation Onix and Onix Plus respectively.

=== Joy ===
When the Onix and Prisma were facelifted in 2016, the base LS trim retained the original front end and became known as the Onix Joy and Prisma Joy. This left the LT as the base trim for the updated Onix and Prisma. In late 2019, the Onix and Prisma were replaced by the second-generation Onix and Onix Plus in Brazil; however, the Onix Joy and Prisma Joy remained on sale, now renamed simply Joy and Joy Plus and featuring the facelift styling that had previously been reserved for higher trim levels. The Joy and Joy Plus were built at the São Caetano do Sul plant in Brazil from 2019 through 2022, before production transferred to GM Colmotores in Colombia in early 2023. In 2024, as GM ceased operations in Colombia and Ecuador, the Joy was discontinued.

=== Technical details ===
All versions feature front-wheel drive, MacPherson strut front suspension, and twist-beam rear suspension, along with dual airbags, ABS, and power steering. In February 2013, the Prisma sedan was launched with a boot capacity of 500 litres.

The 1.0-litre versions are fitted with 14-inch wheels, while 15-inch wheels are standard on 1.4-litre models.

=== Safety ===
==== Latin NCAP ====
In December 2014, the Chevrolet Onix in its most basic Latin American market configuration with two airbags was evaluated under the Latin NCAP 1.0 assessment, achieving a three-star adult safety rating and a two-star child safety rating.

Latin NCAP 1.5 test results Chevrolet Onix + 2 Airbags (from August 2014) (2014, similar to Euro NCAP 2002)
Test	Points	Stars
Adult occupant:	10.67/17.0	3 /5 stars
Child occupant:	20.14/49.00	2 /5 stars

In May 2017, the Onix in its most basic configuration with two airbags and no ESC was re-evaluated under the Latin NCAP 2.0 assessment using the 2016 protocol, achieving a zero-star adult rating and a three-star child rating.

Latin NCAP 2.0 test results Chevrolet Onix + 2 Airbags (2017, based on Euro NCAP 2008)
Test	Points	Stars
Adult occupant:	0/34.0	0 /5 stars
Child occupant:	27.38/49.00	3 /5 stars

In January 2018, an updated Onix in its most basic configuration with two airbags and no ESC was evaluated under the same protocol, achieving a three-star adult rating and a three-star child rating.

Latin NCAP 2.0 test results Chevrolet Onix/Prisma + 2 Airbags (from 15/01/2018) (2018, based on Euro NCAP 2008)
Test	Points	Stars
Adult occupant:	20.24/34.0	3 /5 stars
Child occupant:	32.59/49.00	3 /5 stars

=== Gallery ===
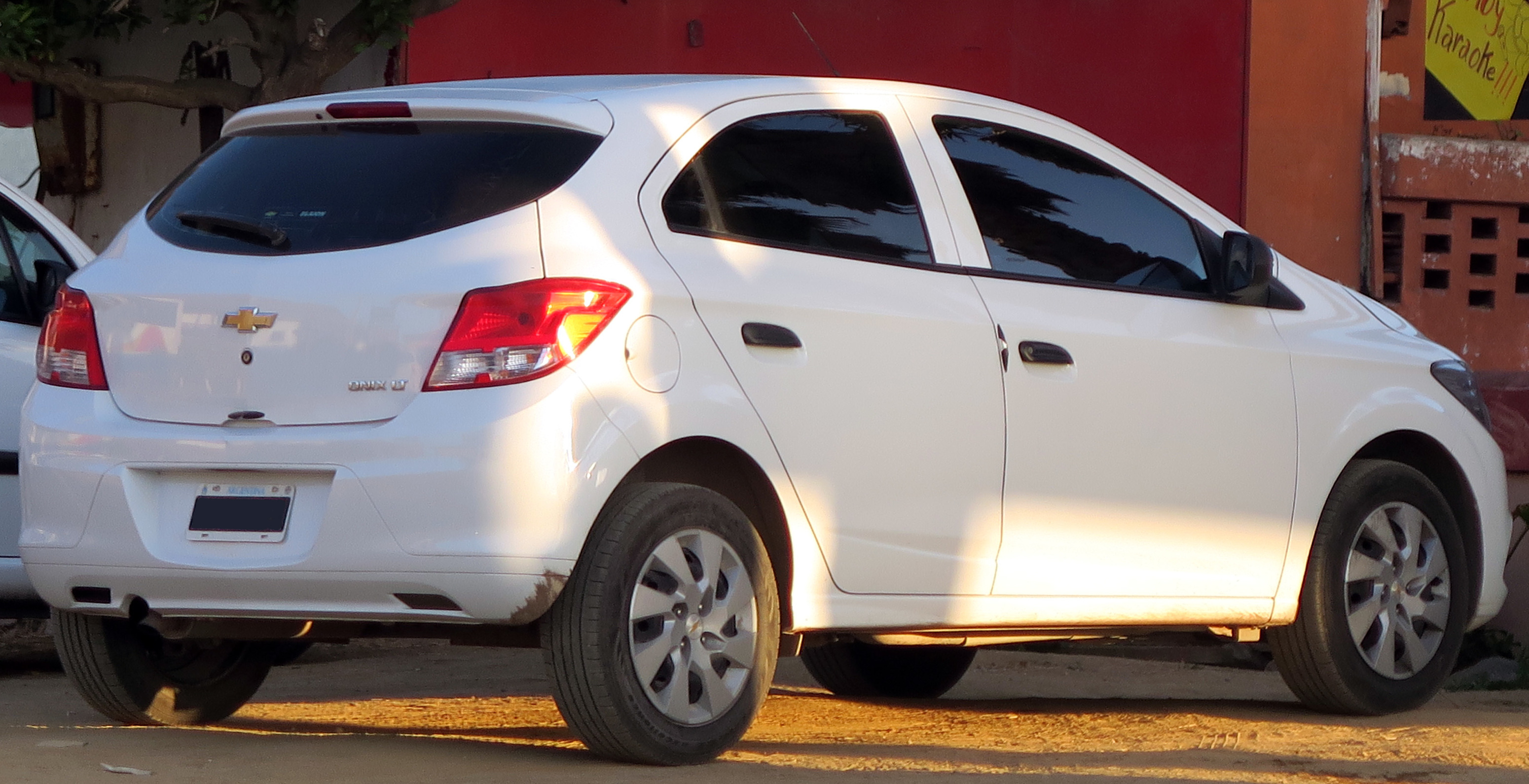
Chevrolet Onix (pre-facelift) rear view

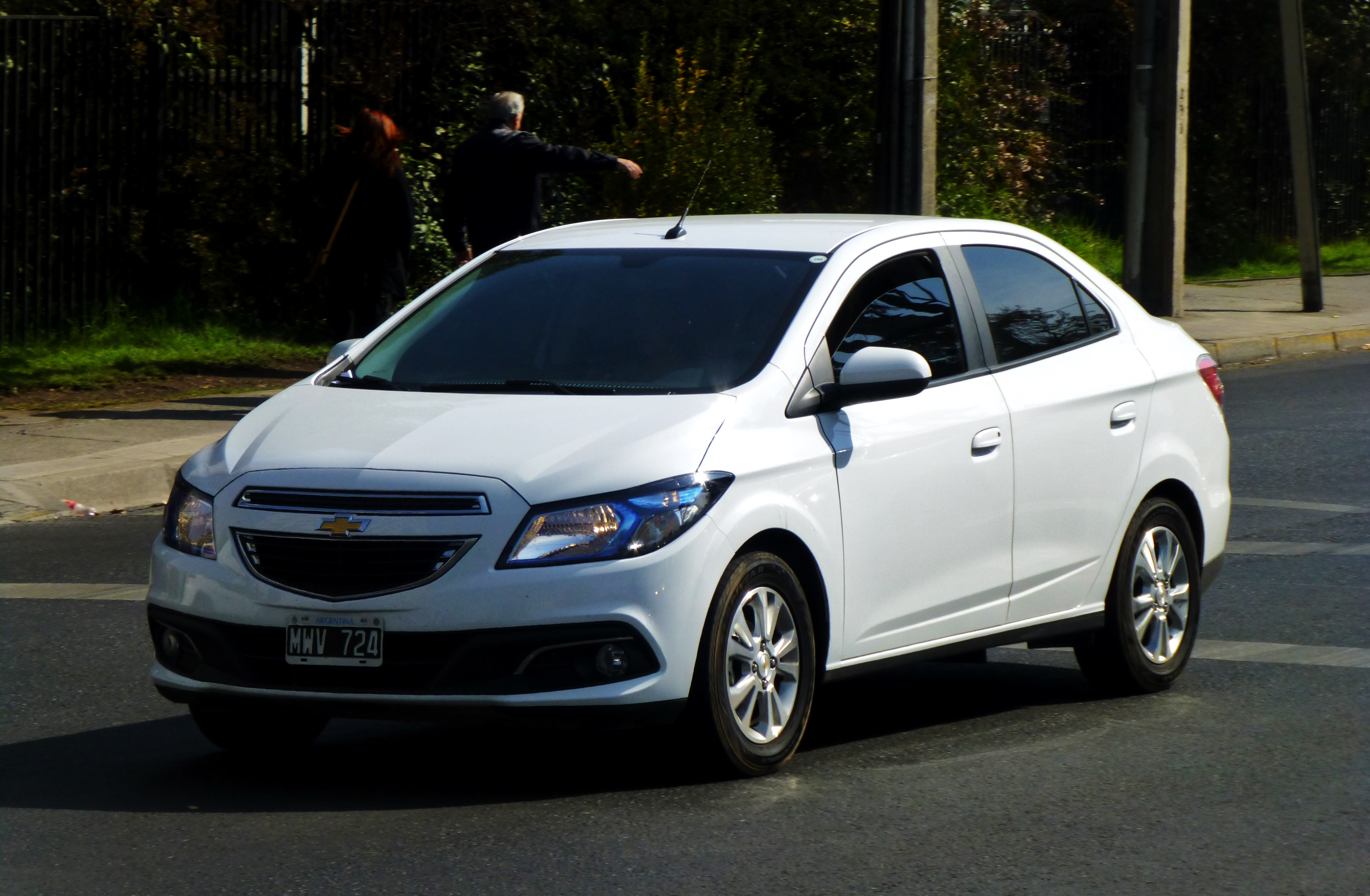
Chevrolet Prisma (pre-facelift)

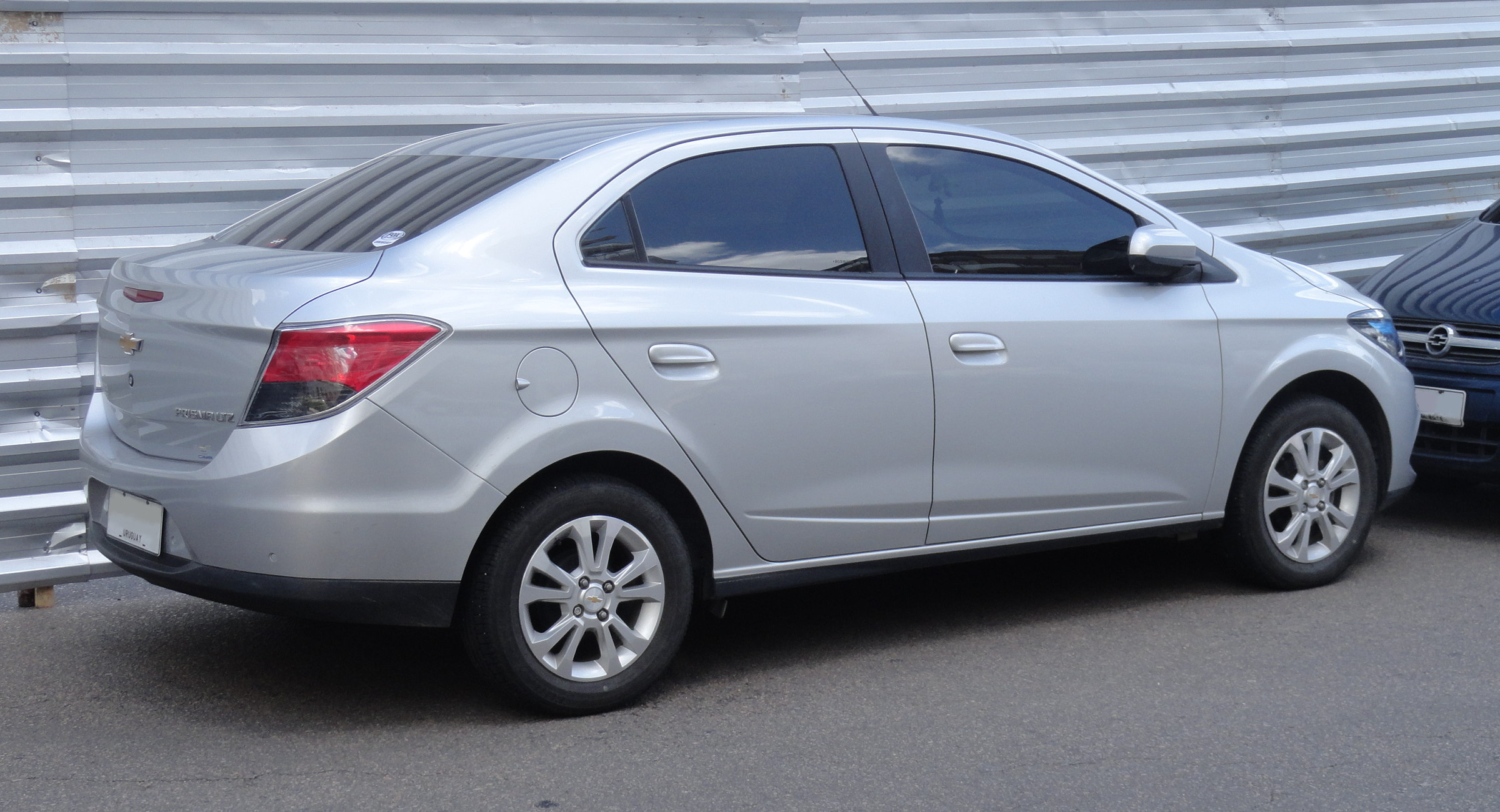
Chevrolet Prisma (pre-facelift) rear view

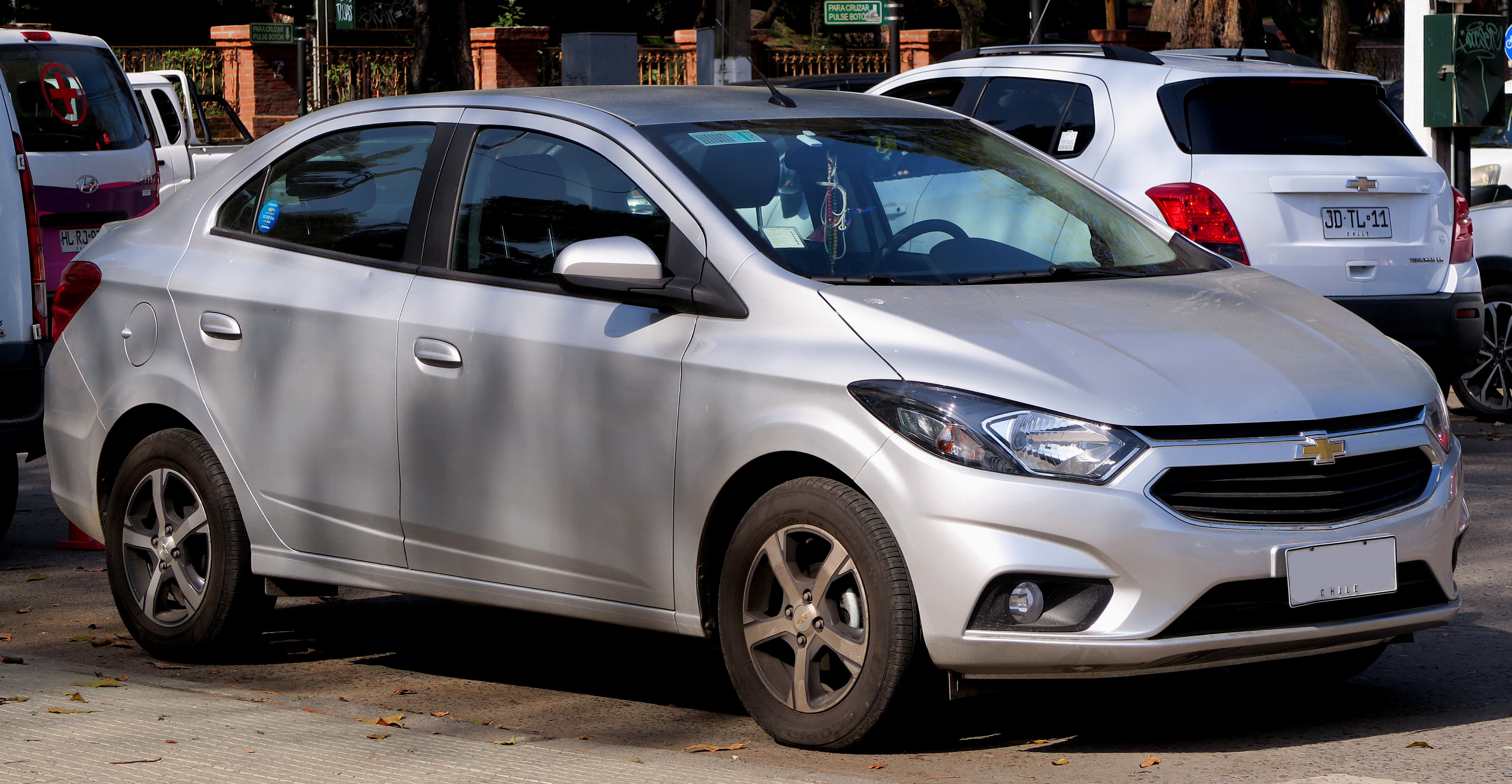
Chevrolet Prisma (facelift)

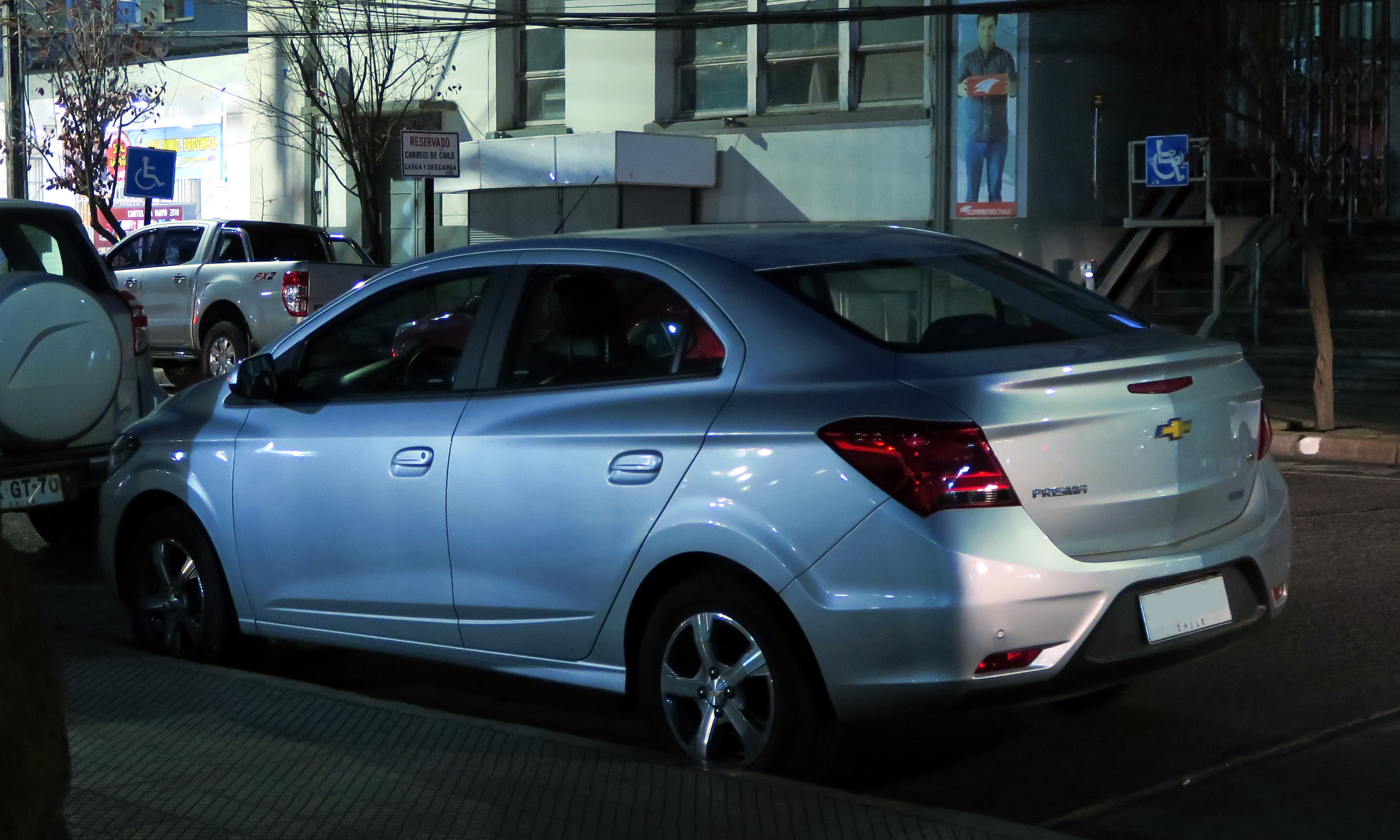
Chevrolet Prisma (facelift) rear view

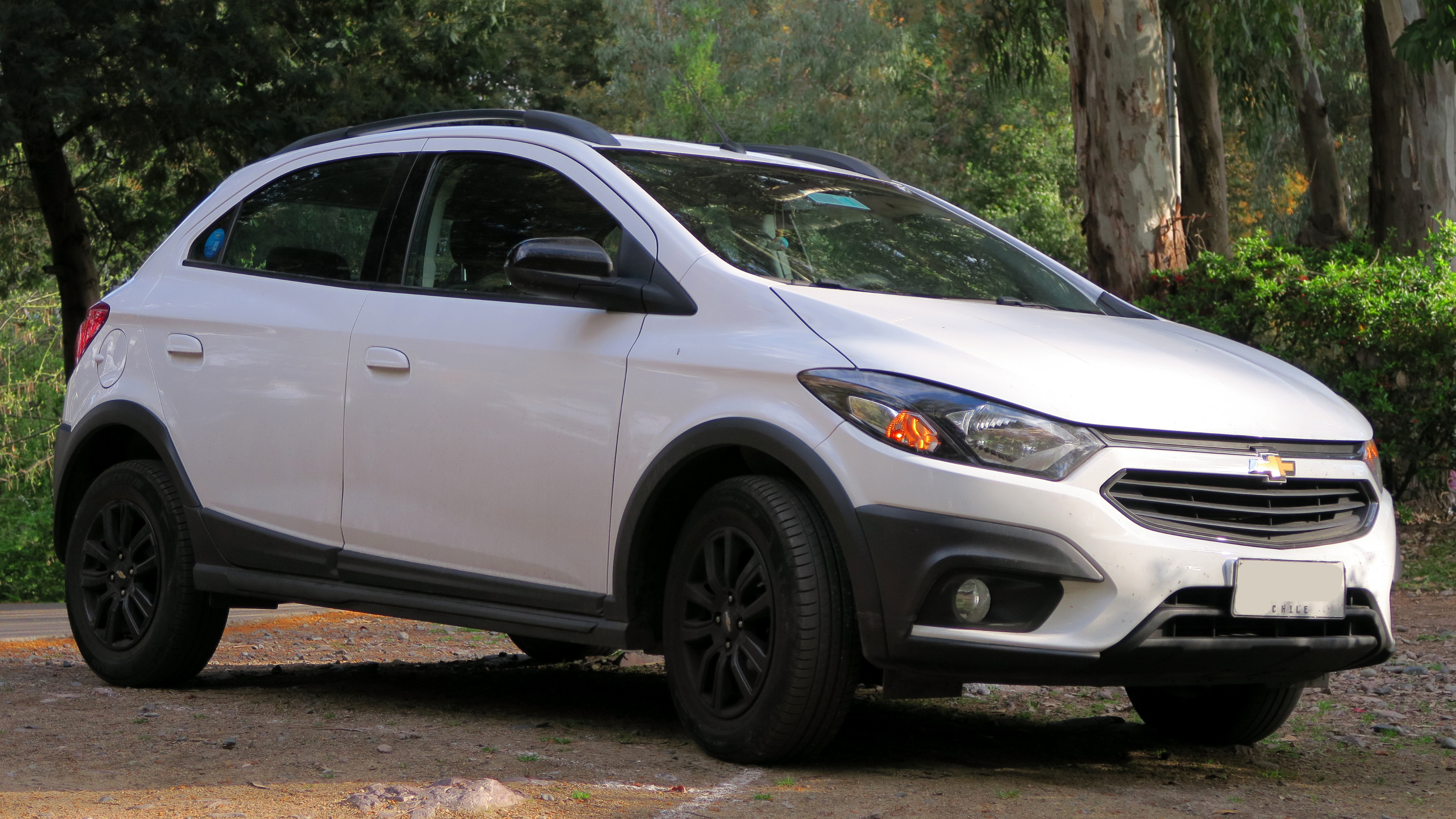
2020 Chevrolet Onix Activ

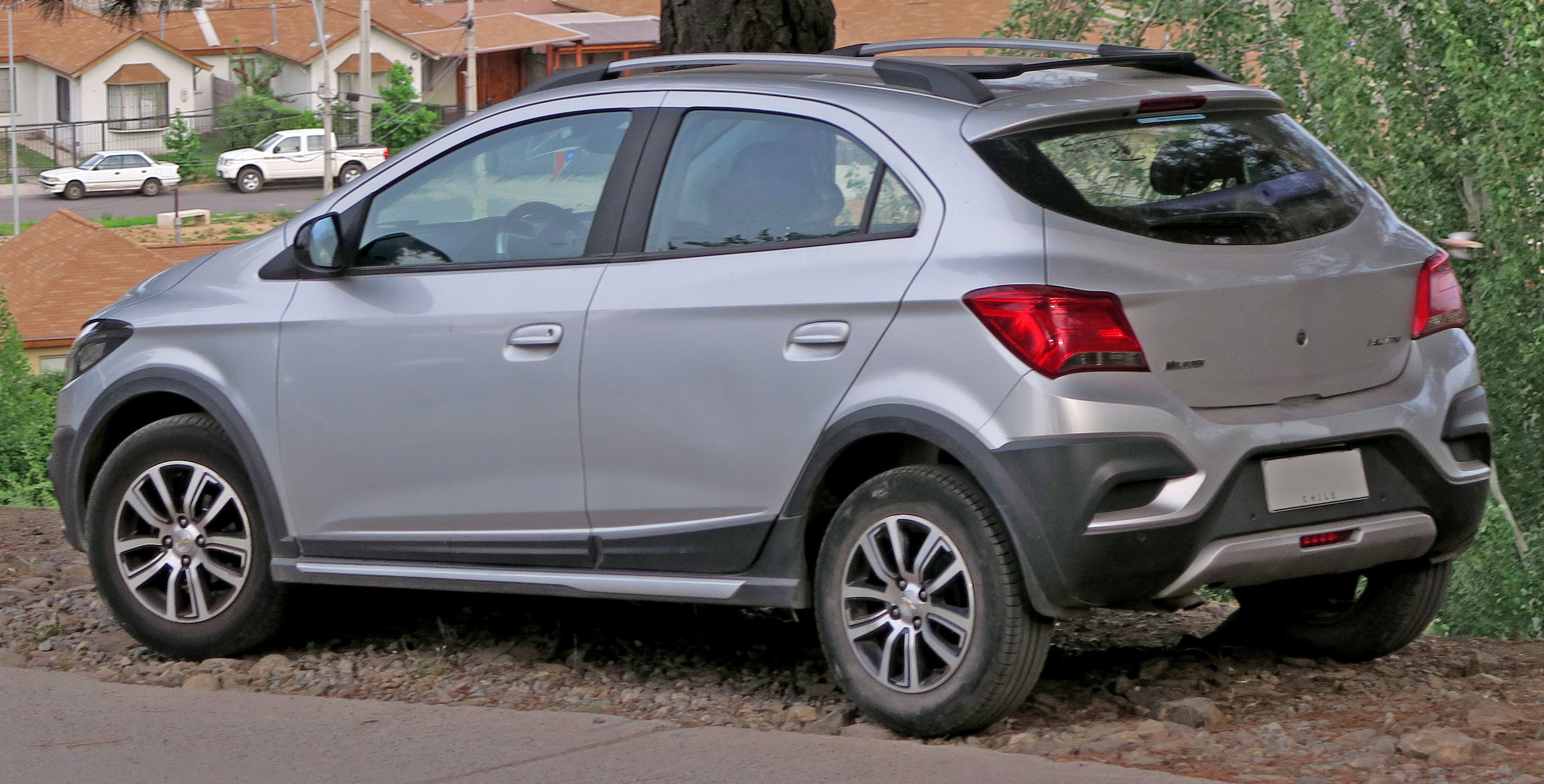
Chevrolet Onix Activ rear view

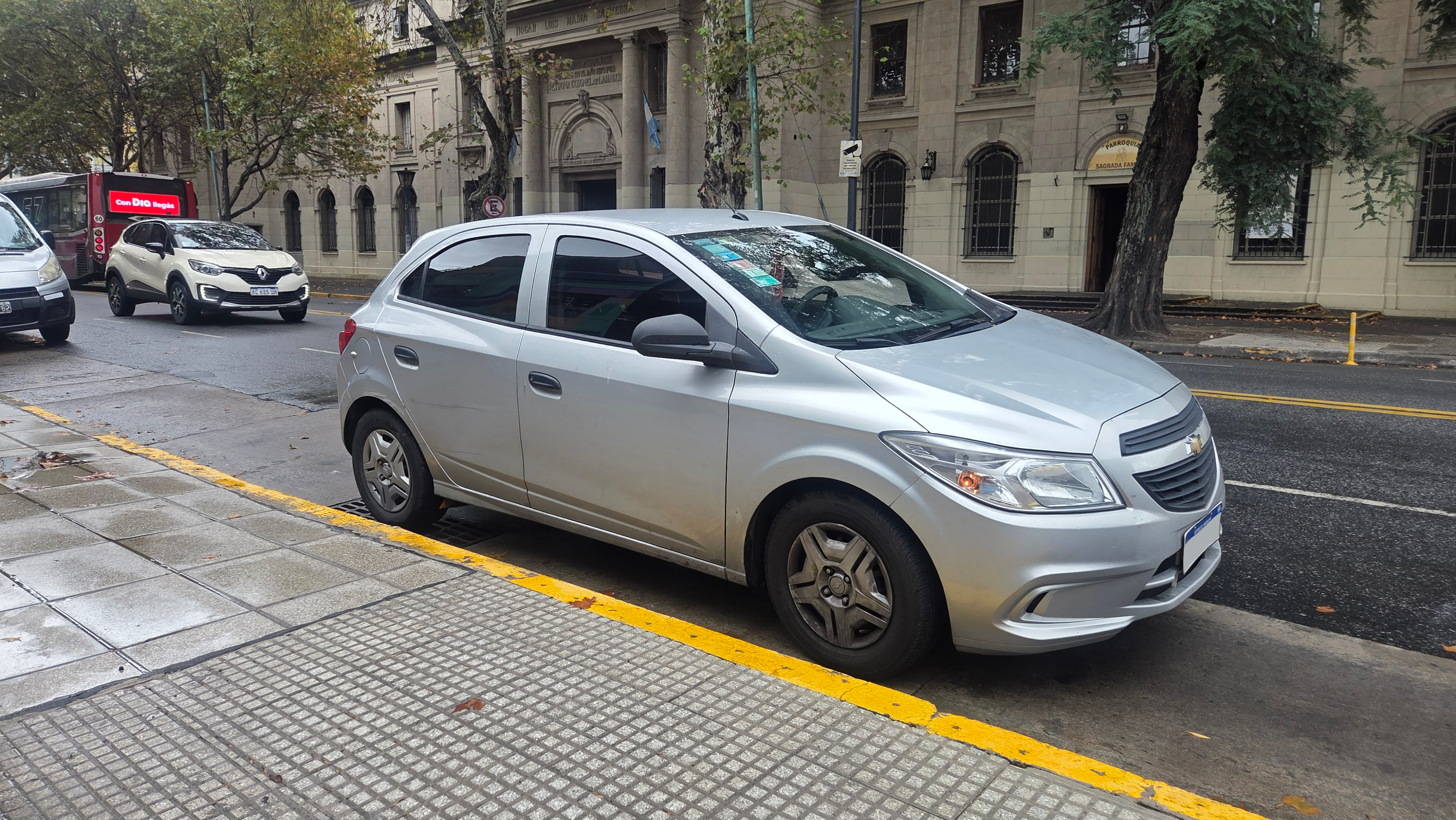
Chevrolet Joy (pre-facelift)

== Second generation (2019) ==
Second generation
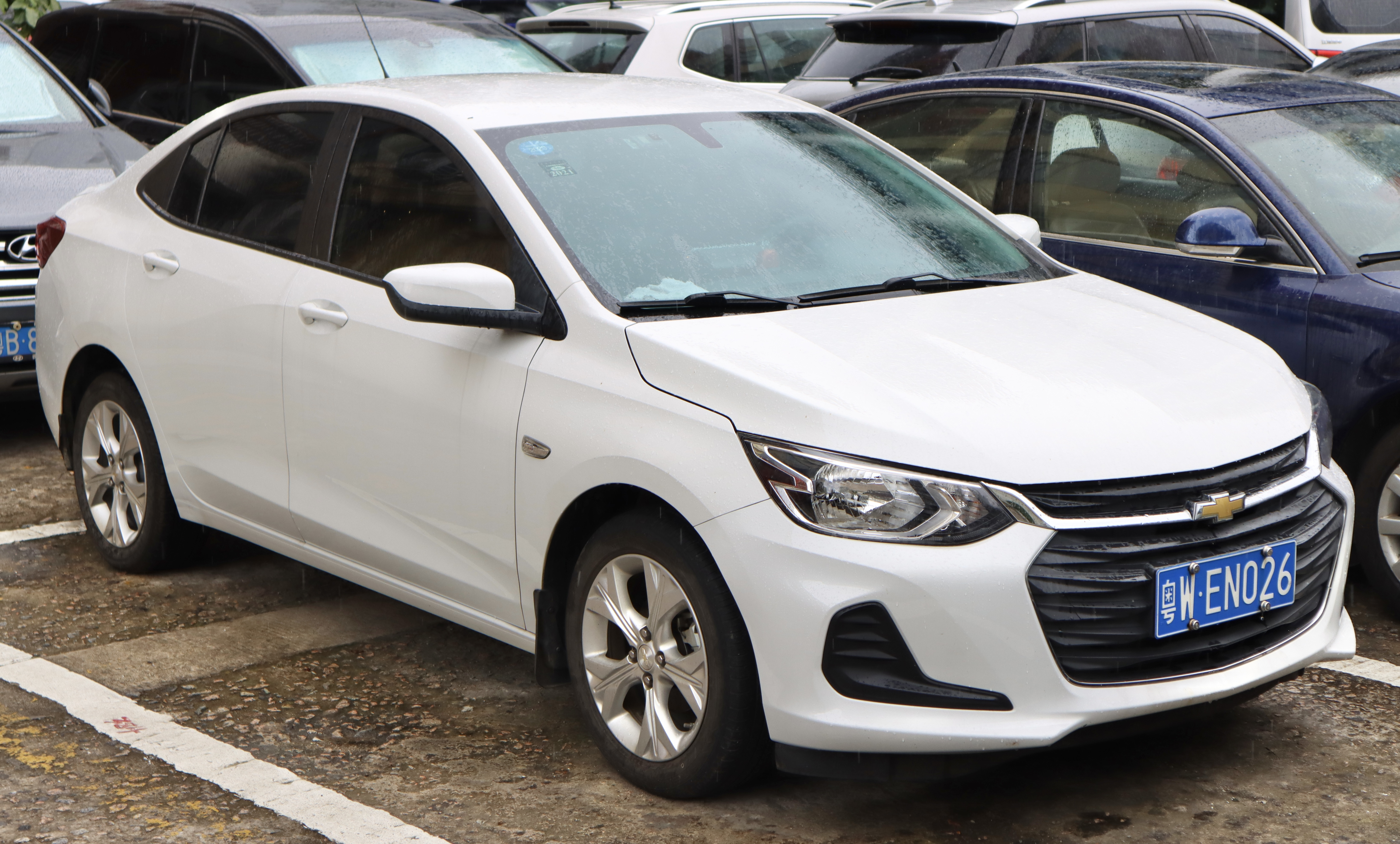
- Chevrolet Onix sedan

Overview
- Production: 2019–present
- Assembly: Brazil: Gravataí, Rio Grande do Sul (GM Brazil); Argentina: Alvear, Santa Fe (GM Argentina); China: Yantai, Shandong (SAIC-GM); Mexico: San Luis Potosí (until May 2022); Uzbekistan: Asaka (UzAuto Motors)

Body and chassis
- Body style: 5-door hatchback; 4-door sedan
- Platform: GM GEM platform
- Related: Chevrolet Tracker; Buick Excelle (second generation); Chevrolet Sonic

Powertrain
- Engine: 1.0 L LIV Ecotec 325T I3 turbo flex fuel; 1.0 L LIJ I3; 1.0 L L4G turbo I3; 1.0 L L4F turbo I3; 1.2 L LIF I3; 1.2 L L4H turbo I3; 1.3 L LGB I3 turbo
- Transmission: 5-speed manual; 6-speed manual; 6-speed automatic

Dimensions
- Wheelbase: 2,550 mm (100.4 in) (hatchback); 2,600 mm (102.4 in) (sedan)
- Length: 4,160 mm (163.8 in) (hatchback); 4,474 mm (176.1 in) (sedan)
- Width: 1,730 mm (68.1 in)
- Height: 1,471 mm (57.9 in)
- Curb weight: 1,120 kg (2,469 lb)

Chronology
- Predecessor: Chevrolet Cavalier; Chevrolet Cobalt; Chevrolet Sonic; Chevrolet Lacetti (Uzbekistan)

In April 2019, a new sedan named the Onix was launched in China under the Chinese name Chinese: 科沃兹; pinyin: Kēwòzī. The Onix replaced both the Sonic and Cavalier in the Chinese market and is slightly larger than the first-generation Prisma. It is built on the GEM (Global Emerging Markets) platform.

In China, the Onix is offered with a turbocharged, direct-injected 1.0-litre three-cylinder engine rated at 92 kW (123 hp; 125 PS) and 180 N⋅m (133 lb⋅ft; 18 kg⋅m) of torque, with a claimed fuel economy of 4.9 L/100 km (20.4 km/L; 57.6 mpg_{‑imp}; 48.0 mpg_{‑US}). A naturally aspirated 1.0-litre three-cylinder DVVT engine is also available on the manual 320 trim. Brazilian versions use port injection on both the turbocharged and naturally aspirated variants.

The first variant to debut was the Onix Redline, featuring black exterior trim with red accents and a two-tone interior.

The Onix has also been produced in Uzbekistan by UzAuto Motors since 2022, with sales commencing at the end of that year.

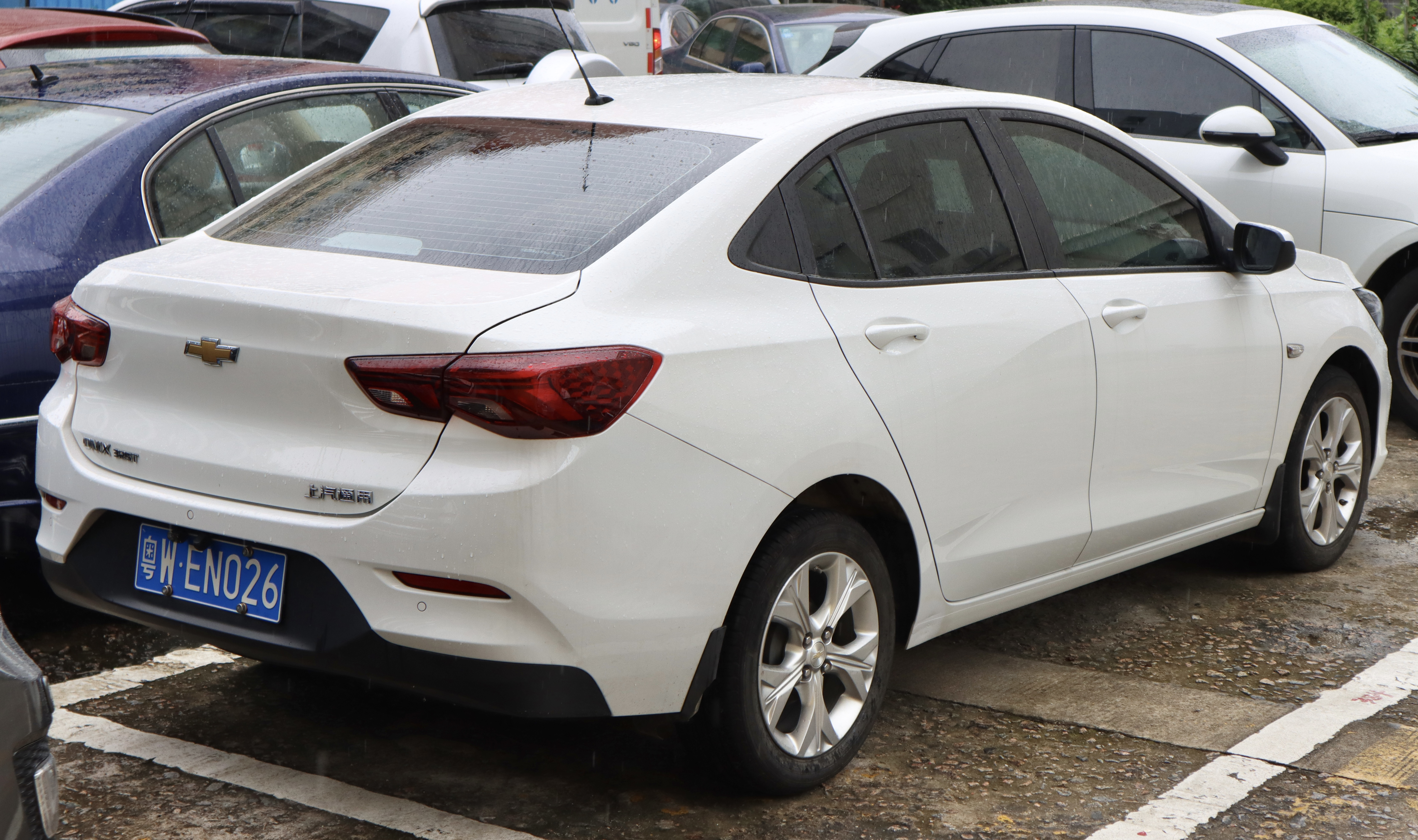
Rear view

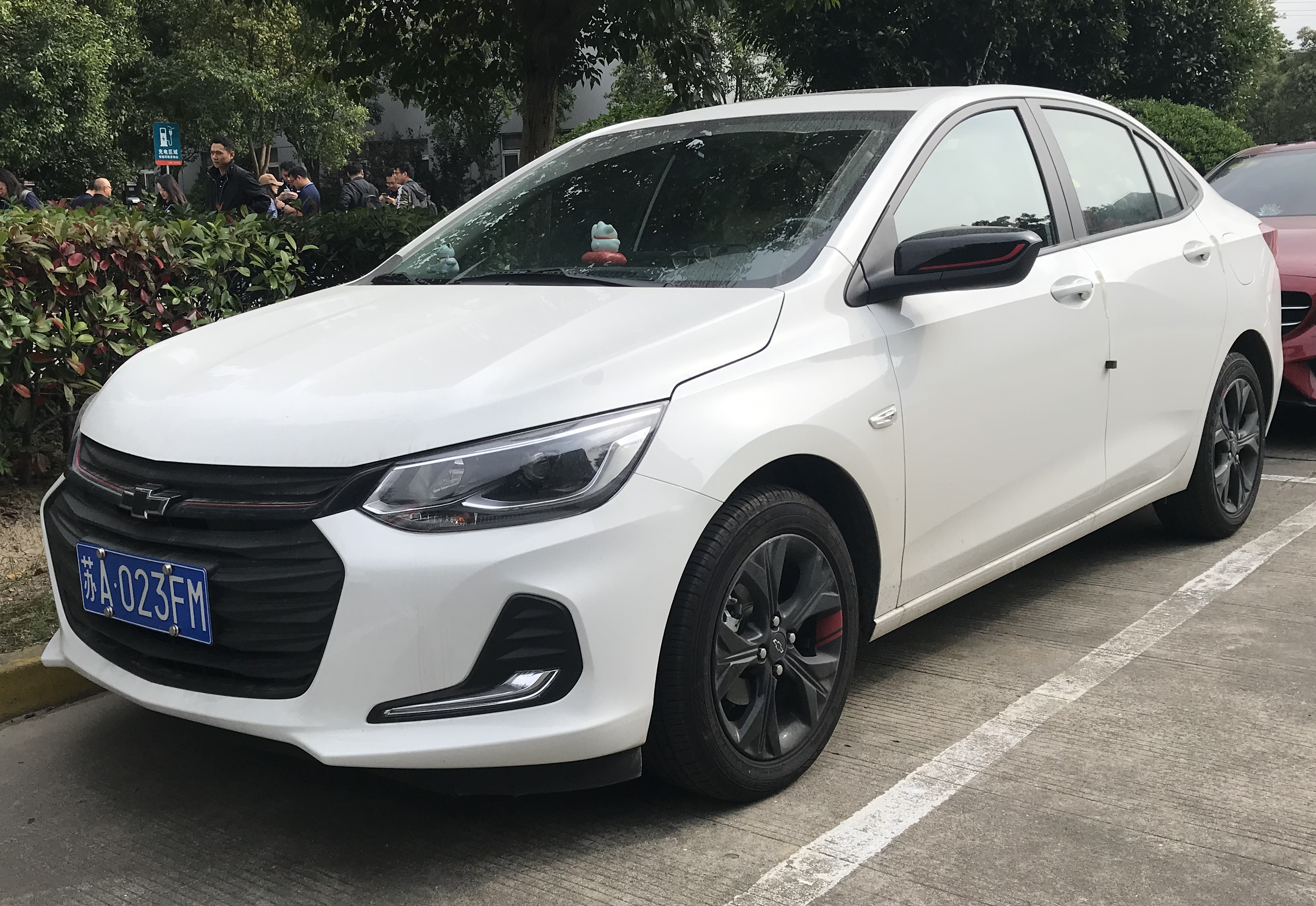
Onix Redline sedan (front), sold in Mexico as the Onix Premier (Redline)

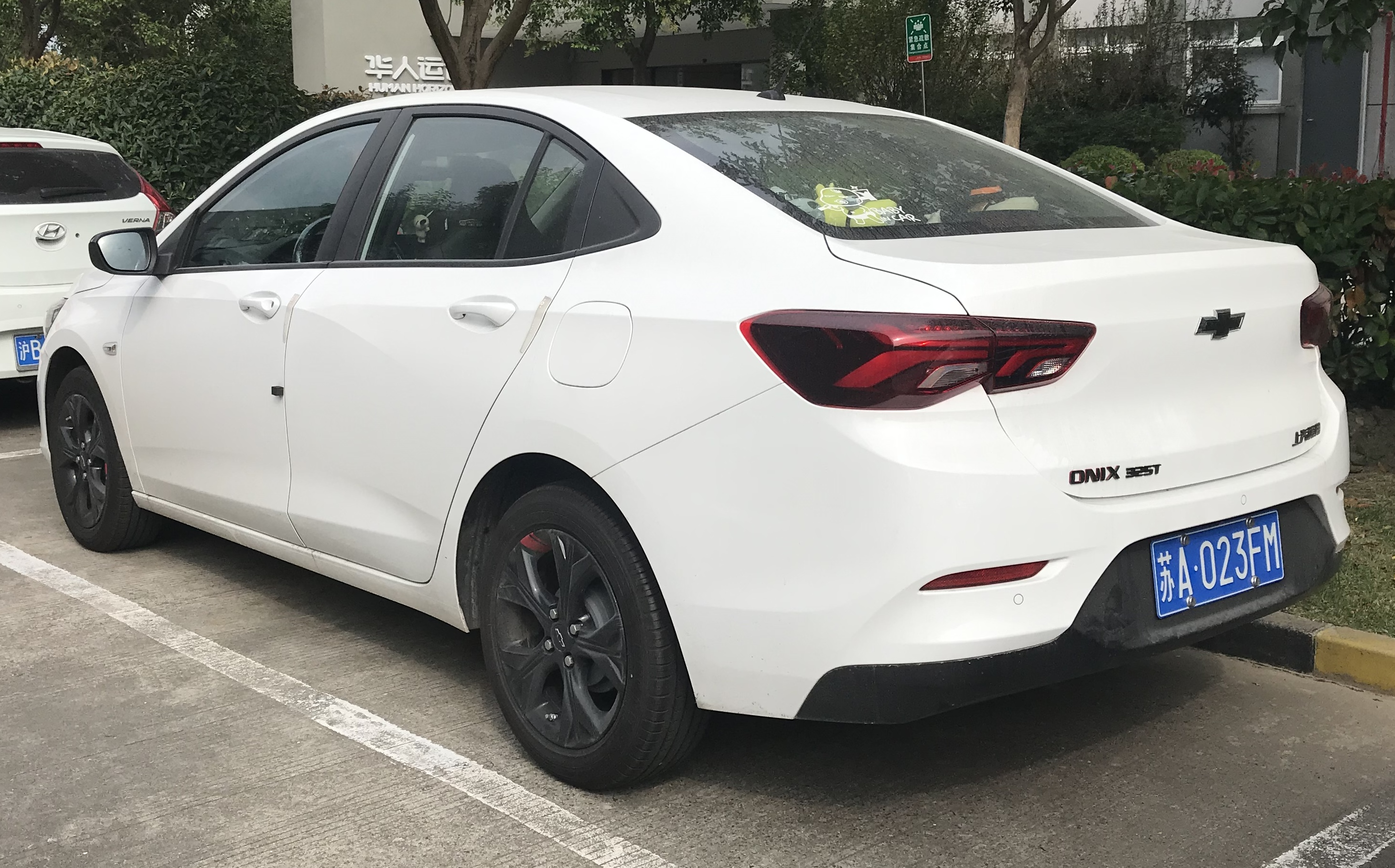
Onix Redline sedan (rear)

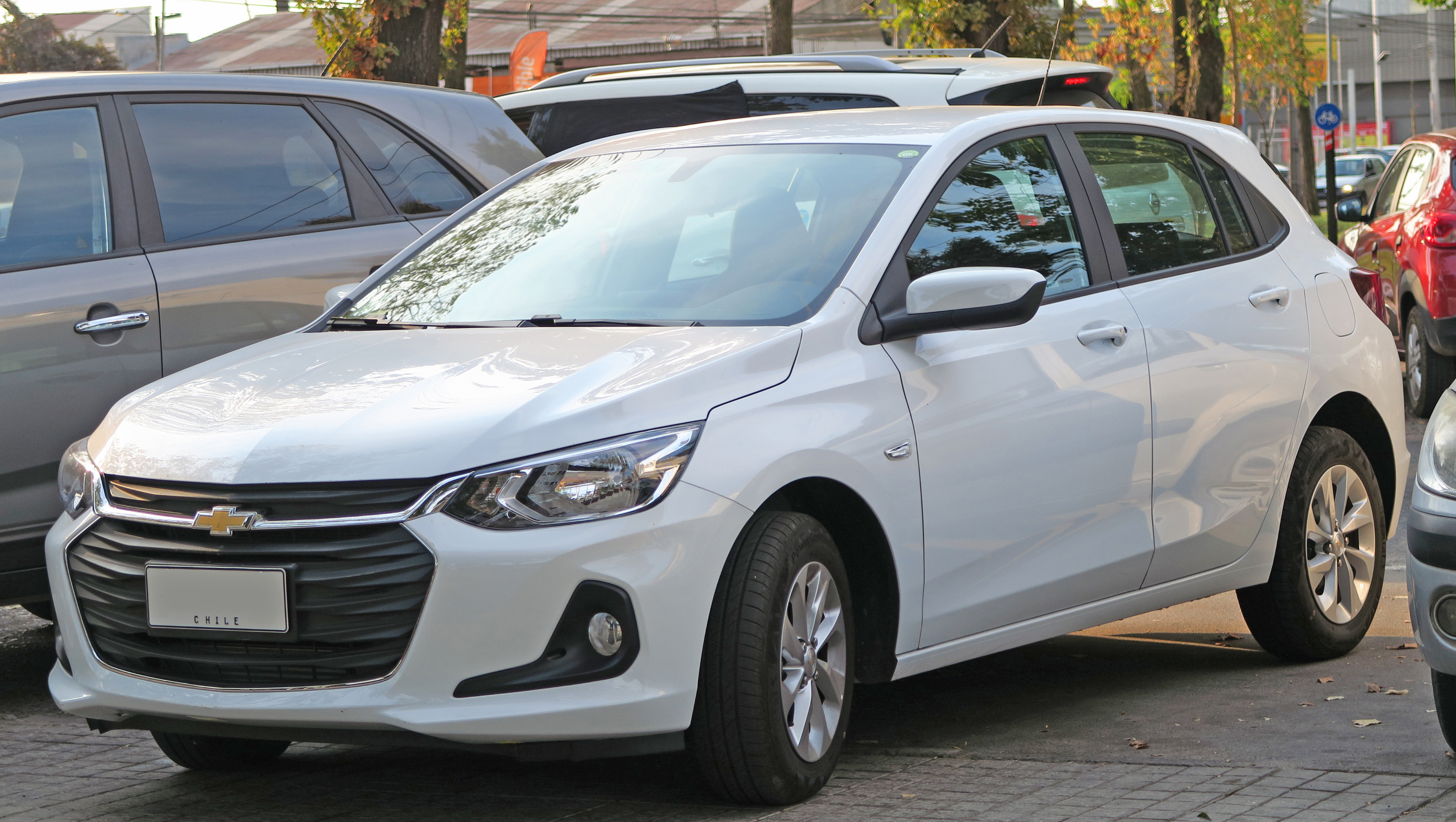
Hatchback (front)

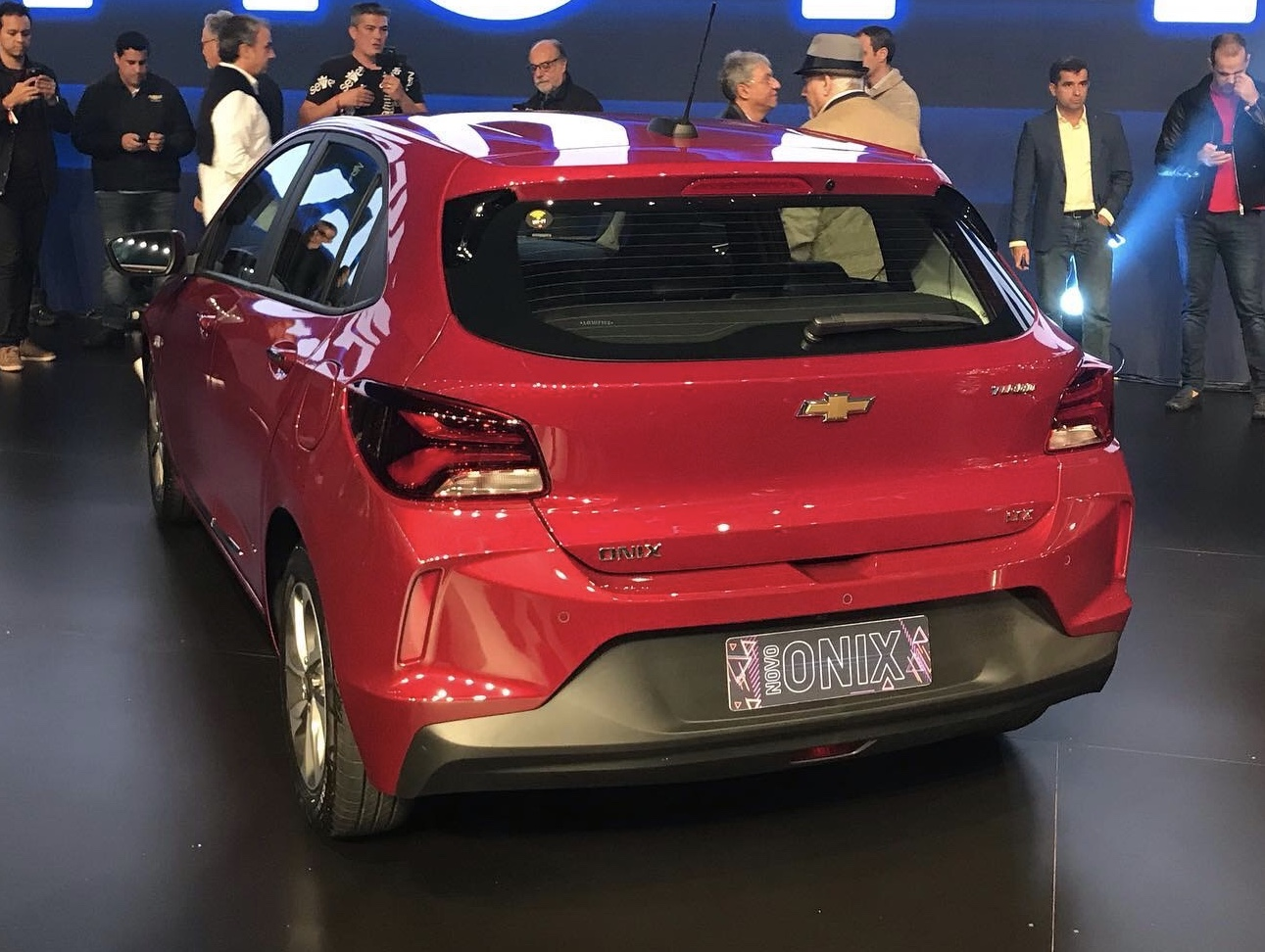
Hatchback (rear)

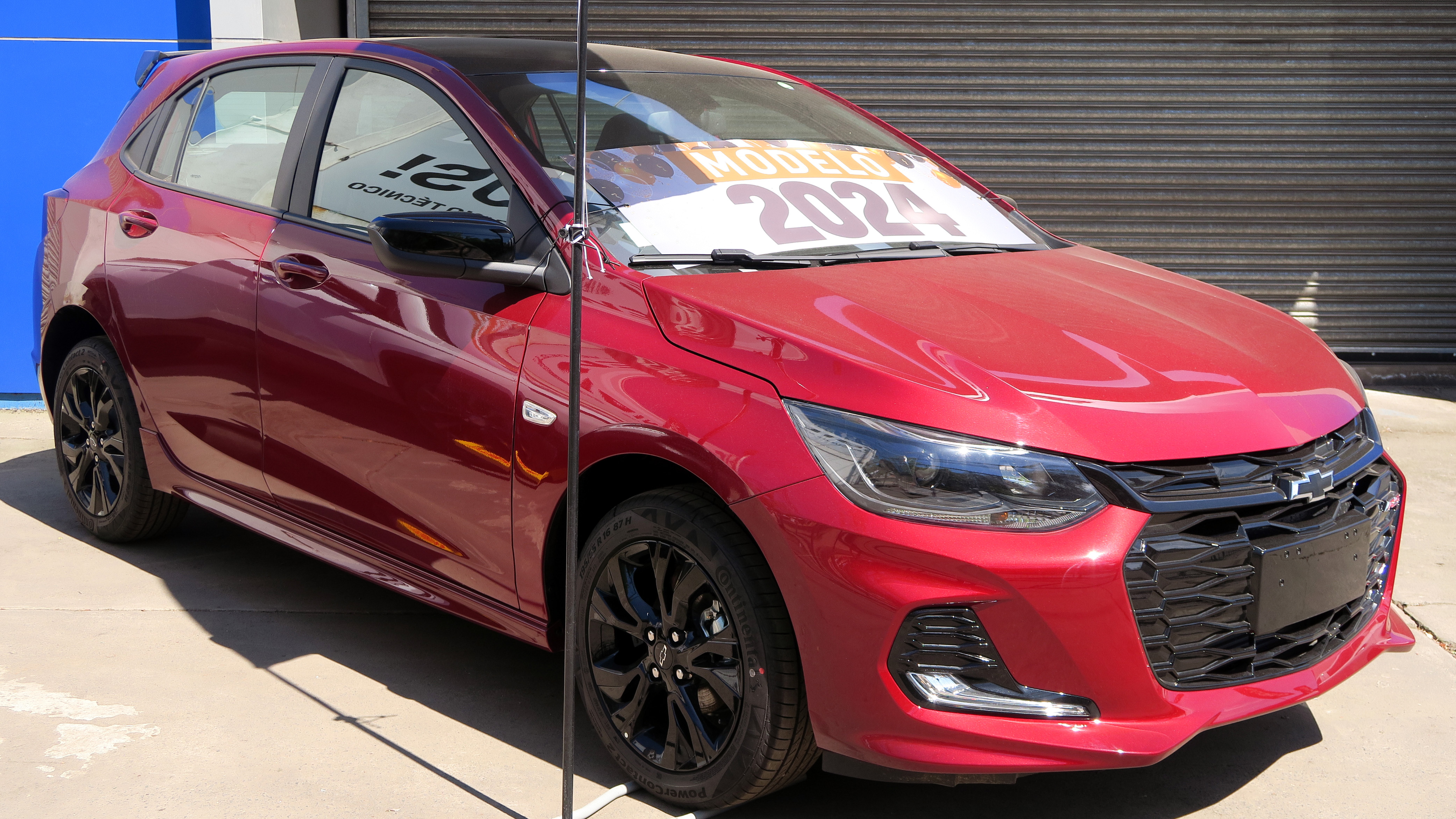
Onix RS

=== Markets ===
==== Brazil ====
In Brazil, the new sedan debuted in September 2019 as the Onix Plus, while the hatchback went on sale in November 2019. In addition to the LT and LTZ trim levels carried over from the previous generation, a new top-level Premier trim was added. The Onix Plus received a five-star rating from Latin NCAP.

Both body styles are available with a 1.0-litre port-injection engine in naturally aspirated (82 hp) and turbocharged (116 hp) forms, paired with six-speed manual or automatic transmissions; the automatic option is exclusive to the 1.0 Turbo. All versions include six airbags, ABS, and electronic stability control.

In 2019, the Chevrolet Onix was the best-selling car model in Brazil for the fifth consecutive year, with 268,066 units sold, and was also the best-selling model in Latin America.

==== Uruguay, Argentina and Paraguay ====
As engines up to 1.0 L do not benefit from reduced taxation in these markets, entry-level versions use a naturally aspirated 1.2-litre engine paired exclusively with a five-speed manual transmission in place of the smaller unit offered in Brazil. Turbocharged versions retain the 1.0-litre displacement and are available with either a five-speed manual or six-speed automatic. Unlike Brazilian models, these variants do not offer flex fuel capability.

==== Mexico ====
The Onix was launched in Mexico in spring 2020, positioned between the Cavalier and the Sail (marketed as the Aveo in that country). It is only sold in a sedan body style.

The LT and LS trims use a turbocharged 1.0-litre engine producing 85 kW (114 hp) and 120 lb⋅ft (163 N⋅m) of torque, with a five-speed manual or six-speed automatic transmission. The top Premier trim uses a turbocharged 1.2-litre engine producing 96 kW (129 hp) and 141 lb⋅ft (191 N⋅m) of torque, available only with a six-speed automatic. All versions include six airbags, ABS, electronic stability control, a 7-inch infotainment screen, OnStar services, and a reversing camera with parking sensors.

Starting in May 2022, the Onix began to be imported from China.

==== Colombia ====
The second-generation Onix was launched in Colombia as the Onix Turbo in March 2020. The first-generation Onix remained on sale and was renamed the Chevrolet Joy from November 2020. The sedan variant was marketed as the Onix Sedán.

==== Uzbekistan ====
The Onix has been produced in Uzbekistan by UzAuto Motors since 2022, with sales commencing in late 2022. In early 2023, UzAuto Motors began accepting orders for the Onix Premier trim. The UzAuto Motors Powertrain plant also produces the 1.2-litre turbocharged CSS Prime three-cylinder engine used in the Uzbekistan-market Onix.

=== 2025 refresh ===
An updated Onix was introduced in Brazil in July 2025 for the 2026 model year. Changes include a new front end with optional LED headlights, an 8-inch digital instrument cluster paired with an 11-inch infotainment screen, and a more efficient engine with a claimed economy of up to 17.7 km/l (41.6 mpg_{‑US}).

=== Powertrain ===
Model	Engine	Power	Torque	Fuel economy
320	"New generation Ecotec" LGB 1.3 L I3 VVT (petrol)	79 kW (106 hp; 107 PS) at 6,200 rpm	130 N⋅m (96 lb⋅ft; 13 kg⋅m) at 4,000–4,400 rpm	4.8 L/100 km (20.8 km/L; 58.9 mpg_{‑imp}; 49.0 mpg_{‑US})
325T, Redline 325T	"Eighth generation Ecotec" LIV 1.0 L I3 turbo-petrol	92 kW (123 hp; 125 PS) at 5,800 rpm	180 N⋅m (133 lb⋅ft; 18 kg⋅m) at 1,350–4,500 rpm	4.9 L/100 km (20.4 km/L; 57.6 mpg_{‑imp}; 48.0 mpg_{‑US})

=== Safety ===
==== Latin NCAP ====
The Onix Plus and Hatchback, in their basic six-airbag configurations, both received five stars for adult occupants, five stars for child occupants, and an Advanced Award from Latin NCAP 2.0 in 2019.

Latin NCAP 2.0 test results Chevrolet New Onix Plus + 6 Airbags (2019, based on Euro NCAP 2008)
Test	Points	Stars
Adult occupant:	28.34/34.0	5 /5 stars
Child occupant:	42.33/49.00	5 /5 stars

Latin NCAP 2.0 test results Chevrolet New Onix Hatchback + 6 Airbags (2019, based on Euro NCAP 2008)
Test	Points	Stars
Adult occupant:	28.90/34.0	5 /5 stars
Child occupant:	42.33/49.00	5 /5 stars

== Sales ==
The Onix was Latin America's best-selling car in 2018, with 249,552 units sold. It was the best-selling car in Brazil from 2015 to 2020, before being overtaken by the Fiat Strada.

Year	Brazil (Note: Figures include both the Onix and Onix Plus.)	Argentina	China	Colombia	Mexico
2012	18,151				
2013	122,340	8,336			
2014	150,838	7,488			
2015	125,034	11,111			
2016	153,380	18,011 (Note: Figures include both the Onix and Onix Joy.)	50,786		
2017	188,668	35,386	188,319	3,337	
2018	210,466	30,286	252,108	5,312	
2019	268,085	16,545	101,765	9,454	
2020	218,770	16,569	39,261	8,659	25,283
2021	128,352	8,724	15,325	5,659	12,362
2022	160,506	6,070	13,223	10,126	26,280
2023	176,946	5,395	25	5,717	18,545
2024	157,443	3,811		4,126	17,919
2025	132,854				11,764
