= GM E-Turbo engine =

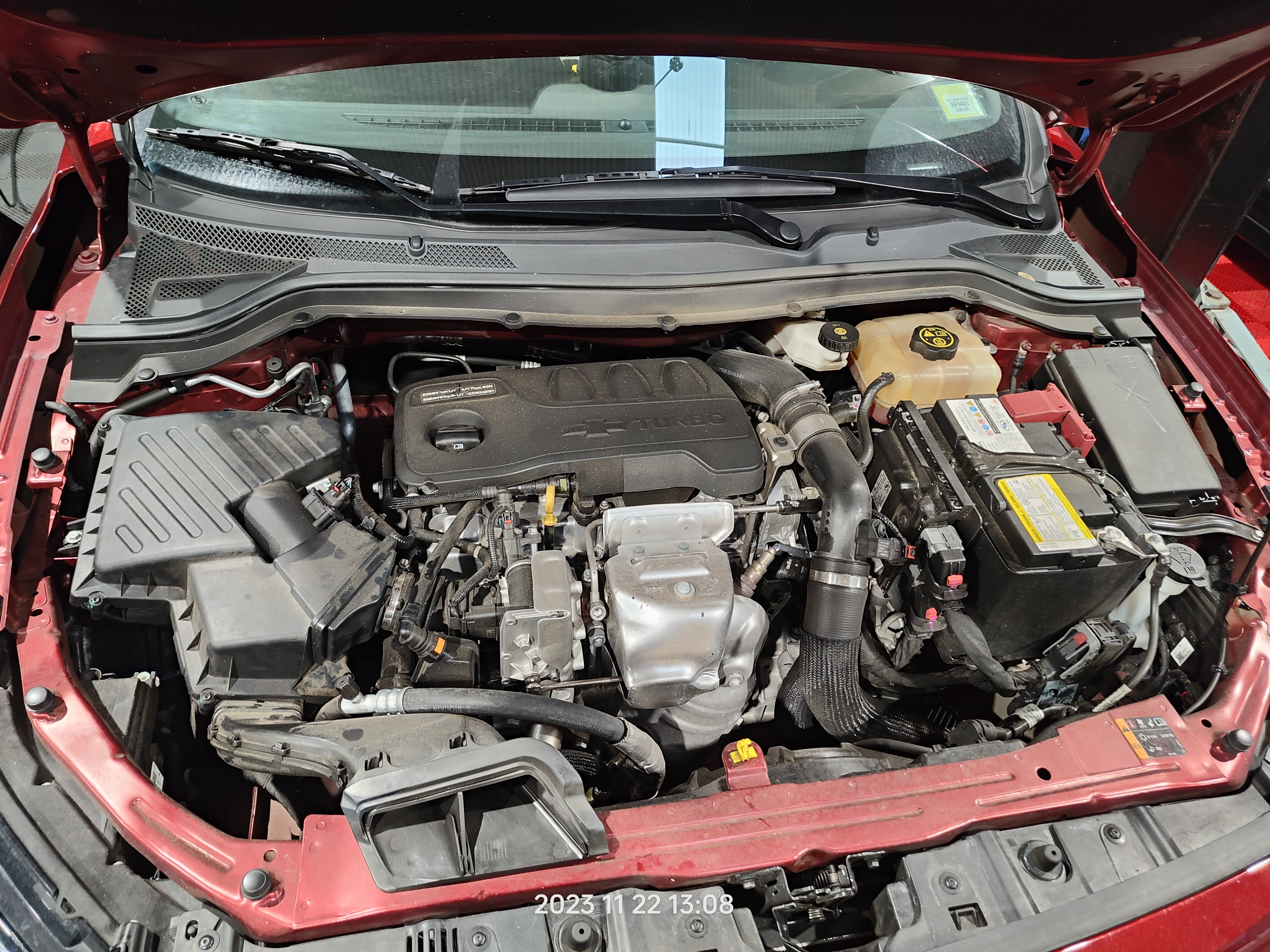
- The LIY 1.35 L inline-3 in a Chevrolet Monza

Overview
- Manufacturer: General Motors, SAIC-GM
- Also called: Eighth-Generation Ecotec; E-Tec; CSS 375T; CSS 45T
- Production: 2017–present

Layout
- Configuration: I3, I4
- Displacement: 999 cc (61.0 cu in); 1,341 cc (81.8 cu in); 1,349 cc (82.3 cu in); 1,498 cc (91.4 cu in)
- Cylinder bore: 72.6–80 mm (2.86–3.15 in)
- Piston stroke: 80.4–91.2 mm (3.17–3.59 in)
- Cylinder block material: Aluminium alloy
- Cylinder head material: Aluminium alloy
- Valvetrain: DOHC
- Compression ratio: 9.5–12.5:1

Combustion
- Fuel system: Gasoline direct injection, port injection
- Fuel type: Gasoline
- Oil system: Wet sump
- Cooling system: Water-cooled

Output
- Power output: 76–208 hp (57–155 kW)
- Torque output: 24.1 kg⋅m (174 lb⋅ft)

Emissions
- Emissions target standard: Euro 6d US Federal Tier 3

Chronology
- Predecessor: GM Small Gasoline engine
- Successor: PSA PureTech engine (Opel, Vauxhall)

The GM E-Turbo engine is a gasoline-fueled engine developed by General Motors as part of the company’s next-generation turbocharged engine family. The engine features a start-stop system, gasoline direct injection, an electric water pump and an electric turbocharger wastegate to optimize fuel efficiency.

The engine is also known as the Eighth Generation Ecotec engine. GM introduced the engine in the 2019 Korean-market Chevrolet Malibu.

== 1.0 L ==
The 1.0-liter inline-3 is the SAIC-GM dual injection E-Tec engine which has a bore and stroke of 72.6 mm × 80.4 mm (2.86 in × 3.17 in) for a displacement of 999 cc (61.0 cu in).

=== LJI ===
The LJI E-Tec was developed for SAIC-GM. It is turbocharged and has twin port injectors mounted closer to the intake valves. It has a bore and stroke of 72.6 mm × 80.4 mm (2.86 in × 3.17 in) with a compression ratio of 9.5:1.

Year	Model	Power	Torque
2017–19	Buick Excelle GT	123 hp (92 kW; 125 PS) @5,600	170 N⋅m (125 lb⋅ft) @2,000–3,600
2018–19	Chevrolet Cavalier	118 hp (88 kW; 120 PS) @5,200	165 N⋅m (122 lb⋅ft) @1,700–4,400

=== LIW ===
The LIW is an updated version of the LJI which meets China 6B emissions standards. It has an increased compression ratio of 10.0:1 but still uses port injection.

Year	Model	Power	Torque
2019–20	Buick Excelle GT	123 hp (92 kW; 125 PS) @5,600	170 N⋅m (125 lb⋅ft) @2,000–4,000
2019–22	Chevrolet Monza	123 hp (92 kW; 125 PS) @5,600	170 N⋅m (125 lb⋅ft) @2,000–4,000

=== LIV ===
This E-Tec variant has direct injection and is turbocharged and meets China 6B emissions standards. It has a bore and stroke of 72.6 mm × 80.4 mm (2.86 in × 3.17 in) with a compression ratio of 10.5:1.

Year	Model	Power	Torque
2019–22	Buick Encore	123 hp (92 kW; 125 PS) @5,800	180 N⋅m (133 lb⋅ft) @1,350–4,500
2019–21	Buick Verano	123 hp (92 kW; 125 PS) @5,800	180 N⋅m (133 lb⋅ft) @1,350–4,500
2019–present	Chevrolet Onix	123 hp (92 kW; 125 PS) @5,800	180 N⋅m (133 lb⋅ft) @1,350–4,500
2019–22	Chevrolet Tracker	123 hp (92 kW; 125 PS) @5,800	180 N⋅m (133 lb⋅ft) @1,350–4,500
2021–25	Chevrolet Tracker (Philippines)	123 hp (92 kW; 125 PS) @5,800	175 N⋅m (129 lb⋅ft) @1,500–4,200

== 1.3 L ==
The 1.3-liter inline-3 engines consist of two engine families, the CSS 45T E-Turbo engine used globally and the SAIC-GM dual injection E-Tec engine used primarily in China. The CSS 45T E-Turbo has a bore and stroke of bore and stroke of 79 mm × 91.2 mm (3.11 in × 3.59 in) for a displacement of 1,341 cc (81.8 cu in) (447 cc (0.45 L) per cylinder), while the E-Tec engines have a bore and stroke of 80 mm × 89.4 mm (3.15 in × 3.52 in) for a slightly higher displacement of 1,349 cc (82.3 cu in).

=== L3Z ===
This CSS 45T variant is used in the Korean and Chinese markets, and was first used in the South Korean Chevy Malibu. It was developed to meet China 6B emissions standards. It is turbocharged and direct injected and has a compression ratio of 10.3:1. It uses an electric water pump, electronic turbocharger wastegate, and electric brake booster.

Year	Model	Power	Torque
2018–22	Chevrolet Malibu (Korea)	154 hp (115 kW; 156 PS) @5,600	236 N⋅m (174 lb⋅ft) @1,600–4,000
2021–present	Chevrolet Trailblazer (Korea)	154 hp (115 kW; 156 PS) @5,600	236 N⋅m (174 lb⋅ft) @1,600–4,000
2019–22	Chevrolet Trailblazer	156 hp (116 kW; 158 PS) @5,600	240 N⋅m (177 lb⋅ft) @1,500–4,000
2019–22	Buick Encore	156 hp (116 kW; 158 PS) @5,600	240 N⋅m (177 lb⋅ft) @1,500–4,000
2019–22	Chevrolet Tracker	162 hp (121 kW; 164 PS) @5,600	240 N⋅m (177 lb⋅ft) @1,500–4,000
2019–20	Chevrolet Malibu XL	162 hp (121 kW; 164 PS) @5,600	240 N⋅m (177 lb⋅ft) @1,500–4,000
2019–23	Buick Encore GX	162 hp (121 kW; 164 PS) @5,600	240 N⋅m (177 lb⋅ft) @1,500–4,000
2020–21	Buick Verano	162 hp (121 kW; 164 PS) @5,600	240 N⋅m (177 lb⋅ft) @1,500–4,000
2020	Buick Lacrosse	162 hp (121 kW; 164 PS) @5,600	240 N⋅m (177 lb⋅ft) @1,500–4,000

=== L3T ===
This CSS 45T variant is branded as Ecotec and is used in North American and European market vehicles. It has a compression ratio of 10.0:1.

Year	Model	Power	Torque
2019–21	Opel/Vauxhall Astra	143 hp (107 kW; 145 PS) @5,000–6,000	236 N⋅m (174 lb⋅ft) @1,500–3,500
2020–present	Buick Encore GX	155 hp (116 kW; 157 PS) @5,600	236 N⋅m (174 lb⋅ft) @1,500–4,000
2021–present	Chevrolet Trailblazer	155 hp (116 kW; 157 PS) @5,600	236 N⋅m (174 lb⋅ft) @1,500–4,000
2020	Buick Lacrosse	158 hp (118 kW; 160 PS)	

=== LI5 ===
This E-Tec variant is naturally aspirated and uses twin port injectors at each cylinder mounted close to the valves. It is sold in the Chinese market. It has a compression ratio of 11.5:1.

Year	Model	Power	Torque
2018–19	Buick Excelle	106 hp (79 kW; 107 PS) @6,200	133 N⋅m (98 lb⋅ft) @4,000

=== LGB ===
This variant is an updated version of the LI5 that meets China 6B emissions standards. It is primarily sold in the Chinese market, but is also exported to Mexico in the Chevrolet Onix.

Year	Model	Power	Torque
2019–23	Buick Excelle	106 hp (79 kW; 107 PS) @6,200	130 N⋅m (96 lb⋅ft) @4,000–4,400
2019–present	Chevrolet Onix	106 hp (79 kW; 107 PS) @6,200	130 N⋅m (96 lb⋅ft) @4,000–4,400

=== LI6 ===
This E-Tec variant is turbocharged and has dual port injectors placed close to the valves. It has a compression ratio of 9.5:1.

Year	Model	Power	Torque
2017–20	Buick Excelle GT	163 hp (122 kW; 165 PS) @5,500	230 N⋅m (170 lb⋅ft) @1,800–4,400
2017–20	Buick GL6	163 hp (122 kW; 165 PS) @5,500	230 N⋅m (170 lb⋅ft) @1,800–4,400
2018–19	Chevrolet Orlando	163 hp (122 kW; 165 PS) @5,500	230 N⋅m (170 lb⋅ft) @1,800–4,400
2017–20	Roewe RX3	163 hp (122 kW; 165 PS) @5,200	230 N⋅m (170 lb⋅ft) @1,800–4,400
2018–21	Maxus G50	163 hp (122 kW; 165 PS) @5,200	230 N⋅m (170 lb⋅ft) @1,800–4,400
2019–20	Maxus D60	163 hp (122 kW; 165 PS) @5,200	230 N⋅m (170 lb⋅ft) @1,800–4,400

=== LIY ===
The LIY is an update to the LI6 which meets China 6B emissions standards. It has an increased compression ratio of 10.0:1 and features a 48-volt mild hybrid system, but still uses port injection.

Year	Model	Power	Torque
2019–25	Chevrolet Monza	161 hp (120 kW; 163 PS) @5,500	230 N⋅m (170 lb⋅ft) @1,800–4,400
2020–22	Buick Excelle GT	161 hp (120 kW; 163 PS) @5,500	230 N⋅m (170 lb⋅ft) @1,800–4,400
2020–23	Buick GL6	161 hp (120 kW; 163 PS) @5,500	230 N⋅m (170 lb⋅ft) @1,800–4,400
2019–23	Chevrolet Orlando	161 hp (120 kW; 163 PS) @5,500	230 N⋅m (170 lb⋅ft) @1,800–4,400
2021–25	Chevrolet Cavelier (Mexico)	161 hp (120 kW; 163 PS) @5,500	230 N⋅m (170 lb⋅ft) @1,600–4,400
2019–22	MG ZS	161 hp (120 kW; 163 PS) @5,200	230 N⋅m (170 lb⋅ft) @1,800–4,400
2019–21	Maxus D60	161 hp (120 kW; 163 PS) @5,200	230 N⋅m (170 lb⋅ft) @1,800–4,400
2019–23	Maxus Euniq 5 PHEV	161 hp (120 kW; 163 PS) @5,200	230 N⋅m (170 lb⋅ft) @1,800–4,400
2019–23	Maxus Euniq 6 PHEV	161 hp (120 kW; 163 PS) @5,200	230 N⋅m (170 lb⋅ft) @1,800–4,400
2021–25	MG Astor (India)	138 hp (103 kW; 140 PS) @5,600	220 N⋅m (162 lb⋅ft) @3,600

== 1.5 L ==
These 1.5-liter engines all have a bore of 74.5 mm (2.93 in) and a stroke of 85.7 mm (3.37 in) for a displacement of 1,498 cc (91.4 cu in). In China they are known as the SAIC-GM CSS (Cylinder Set Strategy) 375T engine family (374.5 cc (0.375 L) per cylinder). It is equipped with variable valve time cam phasers that are twice the speed compared to the previous generation on both intake and exhaust cams. They use a 35 MPa (5,100 psi; 350 bar) direct injection system.

=== LJV ===
The LJV was the first eight-generation Ecotec engine variant introduced to China in the Buick Verano Pro. It has a compression ratio of 10:1.

Year	Model	Power	Torque
2021–23	Buick Verano Pro	181 hp (135 kW; 184 PS) @5,500	250 N⋅m (184 lb⋅ft) @1,500–5,000
2022–25	Chevrolet Tracker	181 hp (135 kW; 184 PS) @5,500	250 N⋅m (184 lb⋅ft) @1,500–5,000

=== LAH ===
The LAH is equipped with a 48-volt mild-hybrid system which contributes an additional 13 hp (10 kW; 13 PS) and 50 N⋅m (37 lb⋅ft) to the engine's total output.

==== LDF ====
The LDF is the longitudinal rear-wheel drive version of the LAH.

Year	Model	Power	Torque
LAH
2021–24	Buick Envision S	208 hp (155 kW; 211 PS) @5,500	270 N⋅m (199 lb⋅ft) @1,750–4,500
2022–23	Buick Envision Plus	208 hp (155 kW; 211 PS) @5,500	270 N⋅m (199 lb⋅ft) @1,750–4,500
2023–26	Cadillac GT4	208 hp (155 kW; 211 PS) @5,500	270 N⋅m (199 lb⋅ft) @1,750–4,500
2023–present	Cadillac XT4 (China)	208 hp (155 kW; 211 PS) @5,500	270 N⋅m (199 lb⋅ft) @1,750–4,500
LDF
2022–present	Cadillac CT4 (China)	208 hp (155 kW; 211 PS) @5,500	270 N⋅m (199 lb⋅ft) @1,750–4,500

=== LP5 ===
An updated higher output version of the LP5 was introduced in March 2025 with the Buick Envision S.

Year	Model	Power	Torque
2023–25	Buick Encore Plus	181 hp (135 kW; 184 PS) @5,500	250 N⋅m (184 lb⋅ft) @1,500–5,000
2023–25	Buick Envista (China)	181 hp (135 kW; 184 PS) @5,500	250 N⋅m (184 lb⋅ft) @1,500–5,000
2022–24	Chevrolet Seeker	181 hp (135 kW; 184 PS) @5,500	250 N⋅m (184 lb⋅ft) @1,500–5,000
2025–present	Buick Envision S	208 hp (155 kW; 211 PS) @5,500	270 N⋅m (199 lb⋅ft) @1,750–4,500

=== LAX ===
The LAX is a variant optimized for use in plug-in hybrids in the Chinese market. It uses the Miller cycle to improve efficiency.

Year	Model	Power	Torque
2023	Buick LaCrosse	177 hp (132 kW; 179 PS) @5,500	250 N⋅m (184 lb⋅ft) @1,500–4,500
2024–25	Chevrolet Equinox Plus PHEV	177 hp (132 kW; 179 PS) @5,500	250 N⋅m (184 lb⋅ft) @1,500–4,500
2024–present	Buick GL8 PHEV	177 hp (132 kW; 179 PS) @5,500	250 N⋅m (184 lb⋅ft) @1,500–4,500
2025–present	Buick GL8 Encasa PHEV	177 hp (132 kW; 179 PS) @5,500	250 N⋅m (184 lb⋅ft) @1,500–4,500

=== LD3 ===
The LD3 is variant optimized for use in range-extender vehicles.

Year	Model	Power		Torque
Year	Model	Maximum	Net	Torque
2025–present	Buick Electra L7	154 hp (115 kW; 156 PS) @5,500	148 hp (110 kW; 150 PS)	230 N⋅m (170 lb⋅ft) @2,500–4,000
2026–present	Buick Electra E7	154 hp (115 kW; 156 PS) @5,500	148 hp (110 kW; 150 PS)	230 N⋅m (170 lb⋅ft) @2,500–4,000
