= Buick Encore GX =

Subcompact crossover SUV

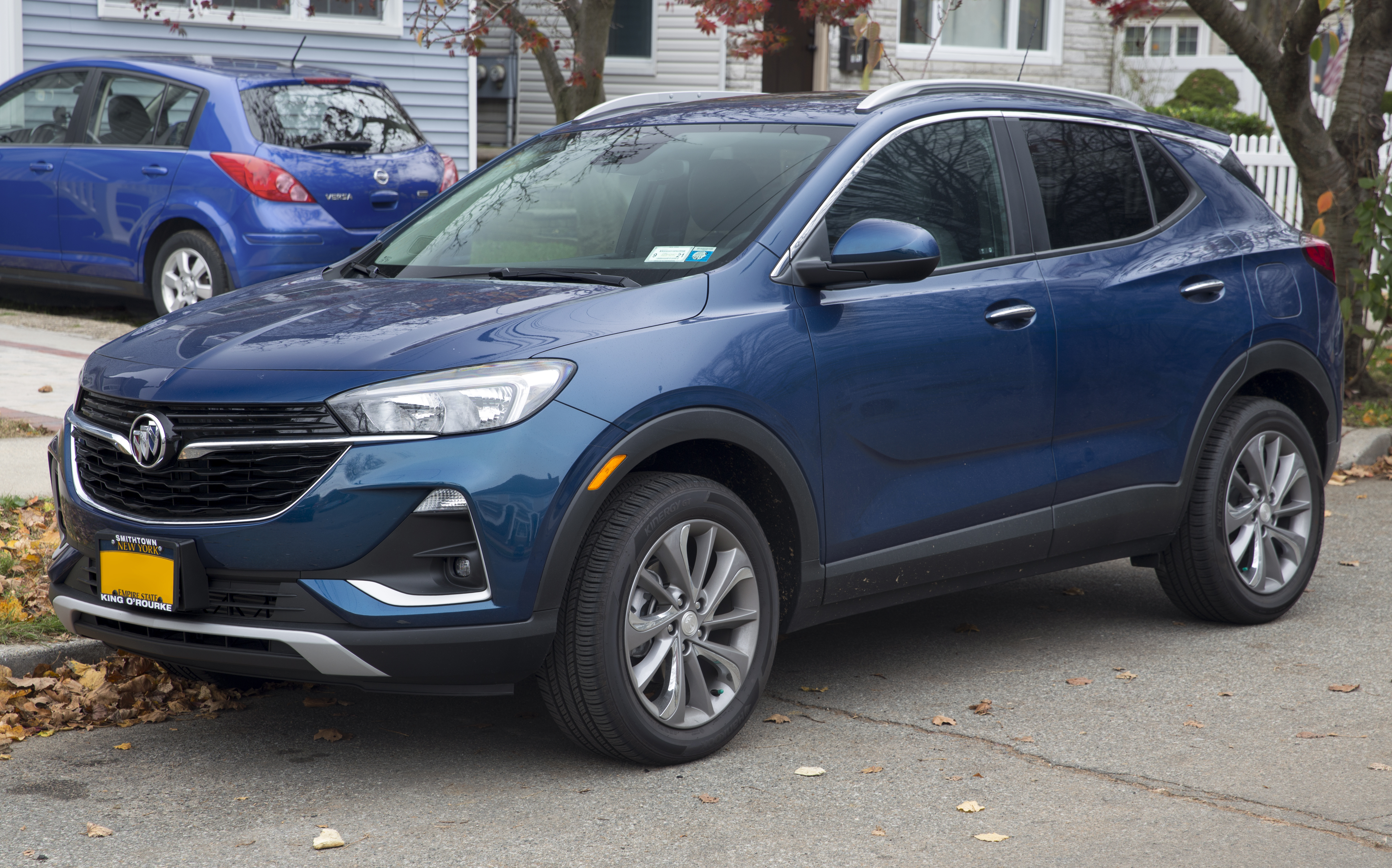

Overview
- Manufacturer: General Motors
- Model code: 9BUB
- Also called: Buick Encore (Mexico); Buick Encore Plus (China, 2023–2025)
- Production: 2019–present (South Korea); 2019–2025 (China)
- Model years: 2020–present (North America)
- Assembly: South Korea: Bupyeong-gu, Incheon (GM Korea); China: Yantai, Shandong (SAIC-GM)
- Designer: Design Leadership (2020): Ryan Vaughan & Roberto Rempel; Design Leadership: (2024): Bob Boniface, Hun-gil Lee

Body and chassis
- Class: Subcompact crossover SUV
- Body style: 5-door SUV
- Layout: Front-engine, front-wheel-drive; Front-engine, all-wheel-drive
- Platform: GM VSS-F (9BUB)
- Related: Chevrolet Trailblazer (crossover)

Powertrain
- Engine: Gasoline: 1.2 L LIH turbo I3; 1.3 L L3T turbo I3; 1.5 L LYX turbo I4 (China)
- Transmission: 9-speed automatic (AWD); CVT (FWD)

Dimensions
- Wheelbase: 2,595 mm (102.2 in)
- Length: 4,354 mm (171.4 in)
- Width: 1,813 mm (71.4 in)
- Height: 1,629 mm (64.1 in)

The Buick Encore GX is a subcompact crossover SUV built by General Motors starting in 2019. Like the smaller Encore and the related Chevrolet Trailblazer, the Encore GX is manufactured by GM Korea. In China, it is manufactured by the SAIC-GM joint venture.

== Overview ==
The Encore GX was revealed alongside the second generation Encore at the 2019 Shanghai Auto Show. It shares the VSS-F platform with the new Chevrolet Trailblazer crossover SUV and its codename is 9BUB. The size of the Encore GX is subcompact-plus, positioned between the subcompact Encore and the compact Envision.

After the discontinuation of the smaller Encore, the Encore GX was the entry-level offering from Buick, until the arrival of the larger but less expensive Envista.

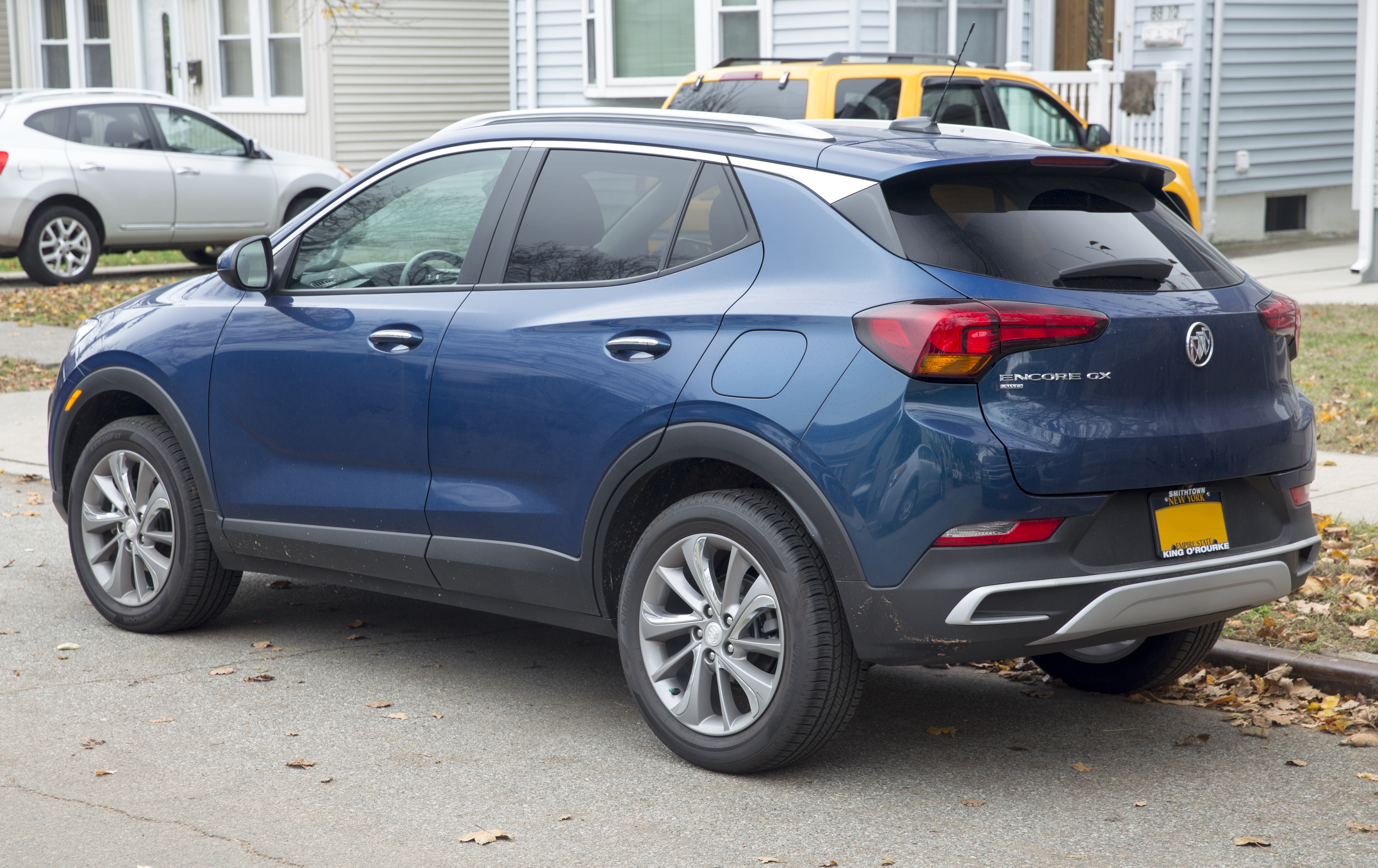
Rear view

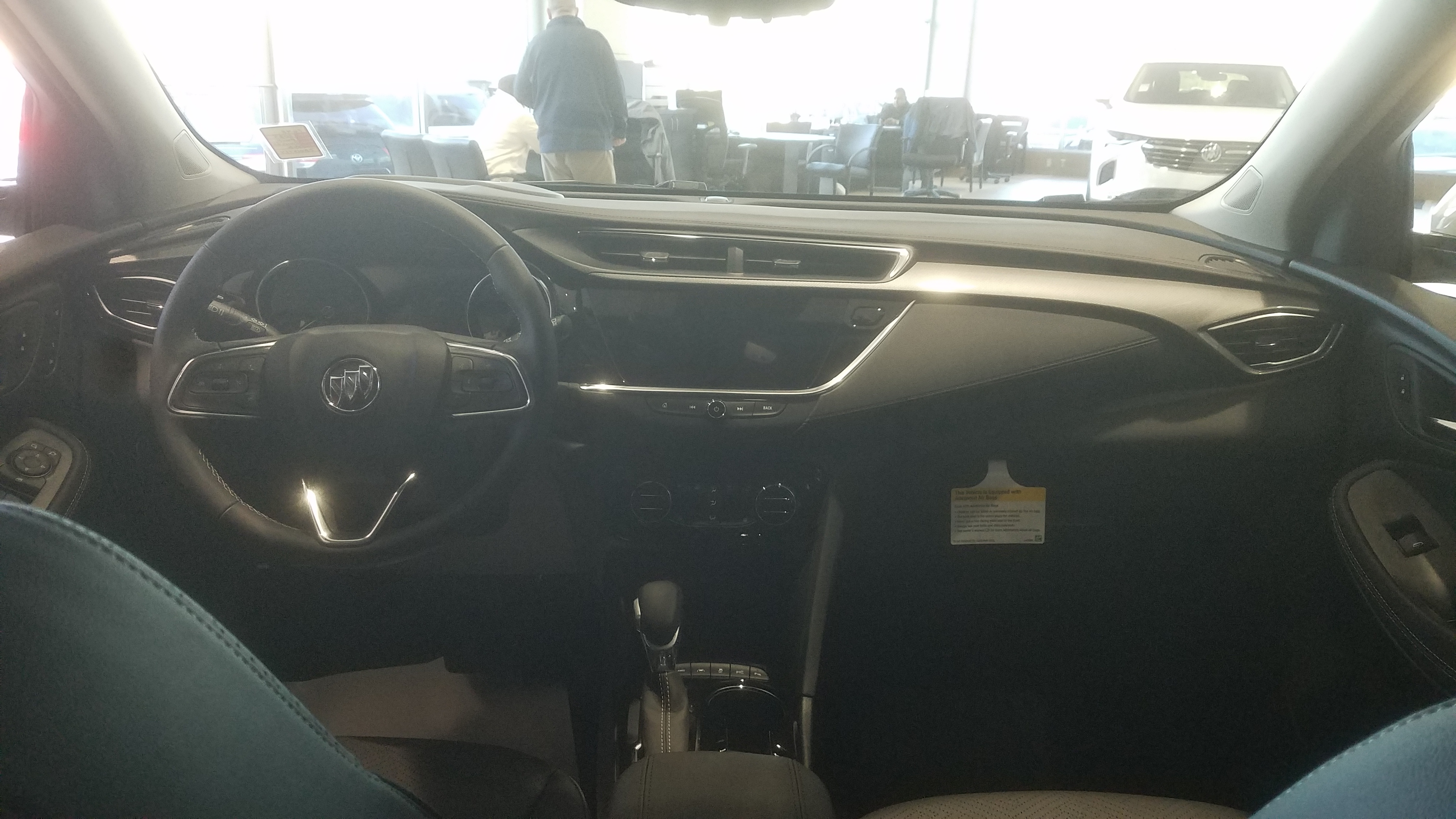
Interior

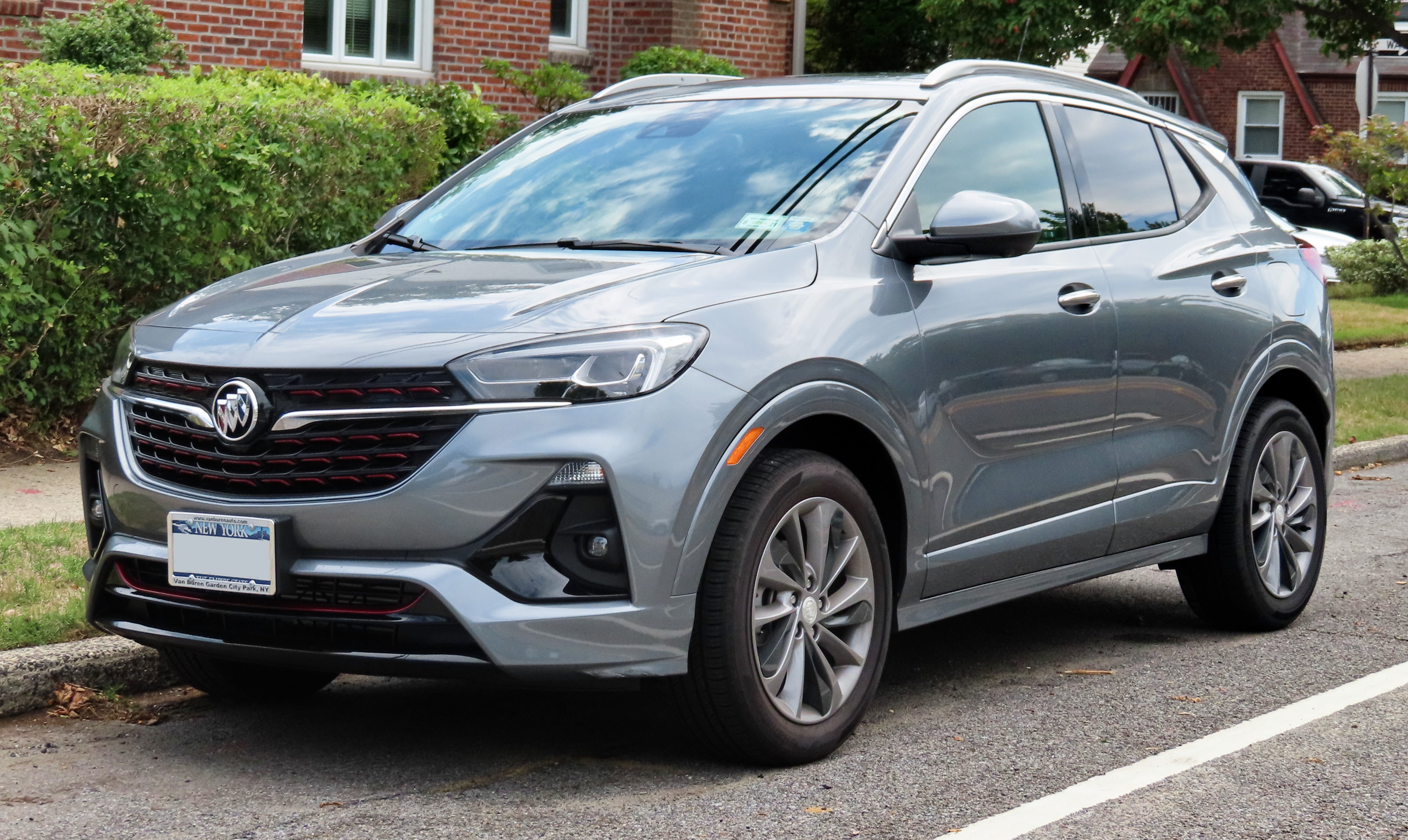
Buick Encore GX with the Sport Touring package

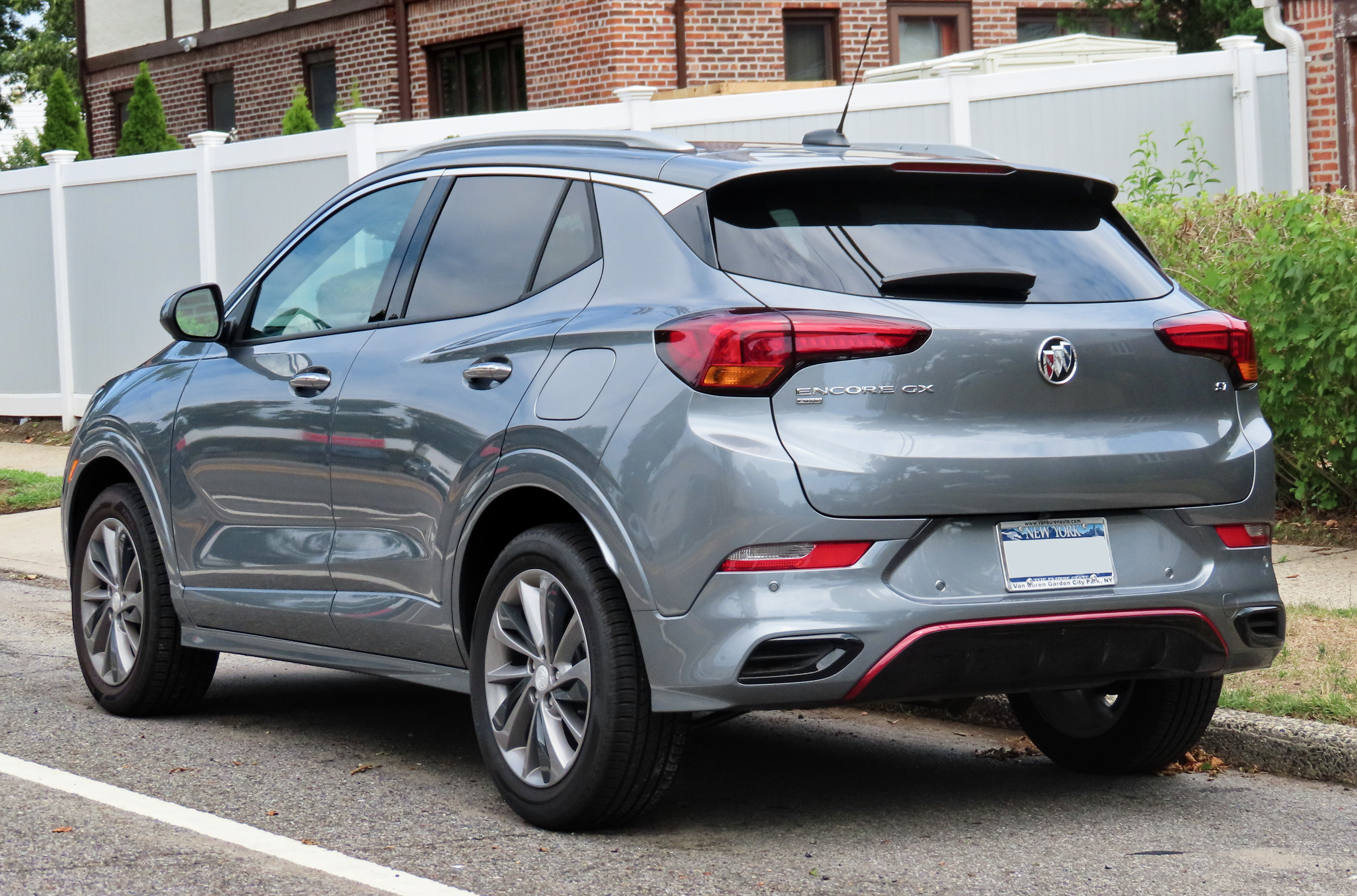
Rear view

== North America ==
In North America, the Encore GX was introduced at the Los Angeles Auto Show in November 2019, and made its debut in early 2020 for the 2020 model year. It is positioned between the smaller Buick Encore and the midsize Buick Envision, but it does not replace the Buick Encore in the North American market. The Encore GX includes several standard safety assistance features, such as automatic emergency braking, forward collision alert, and lane departure warning.

The Encore GX was launched in three trims: Preferred, Select, and Essence. It also gets a Sport Touring package that adds visual enhancements such as a custom grille with Red accents, sporty front & rear bumpers with Red accents, body-colored mouldings, and exclusive 18-inch wheels, but no mechanical upgrades.

=== Mexico ===
In Mexico, the Encore GX was launched in February 2020 and is marketed simply as the Encore. It is offered there in Convenience, Leather, and Sport Touring trim levels. The 1.3-liter turbo I3 is the only engine available. The Encore GX replaces the original Encore in Mexico, unlike the US and Canada where both were available up to and including the 2022 model year.

=== 2024 refresh ===
In 2023, Buick unveiled the facelifted Encore GX for the 2024 model year. It adopts Buick's new Pure Design philosophy and corporate emblem. With the 2024 facelift, trim levels have changed now with base Preferred, mid-level ST, and luxury-oriented Avenir. This update included the removal of four notable features previously offered, including; fog lights (due to the new lower placement of the headlights below the turn signal lights on the hood), Head Up Display (HUD) panel, auxiliary audio input jack in the lower dashboard panel, and Automatic Parking Assist.

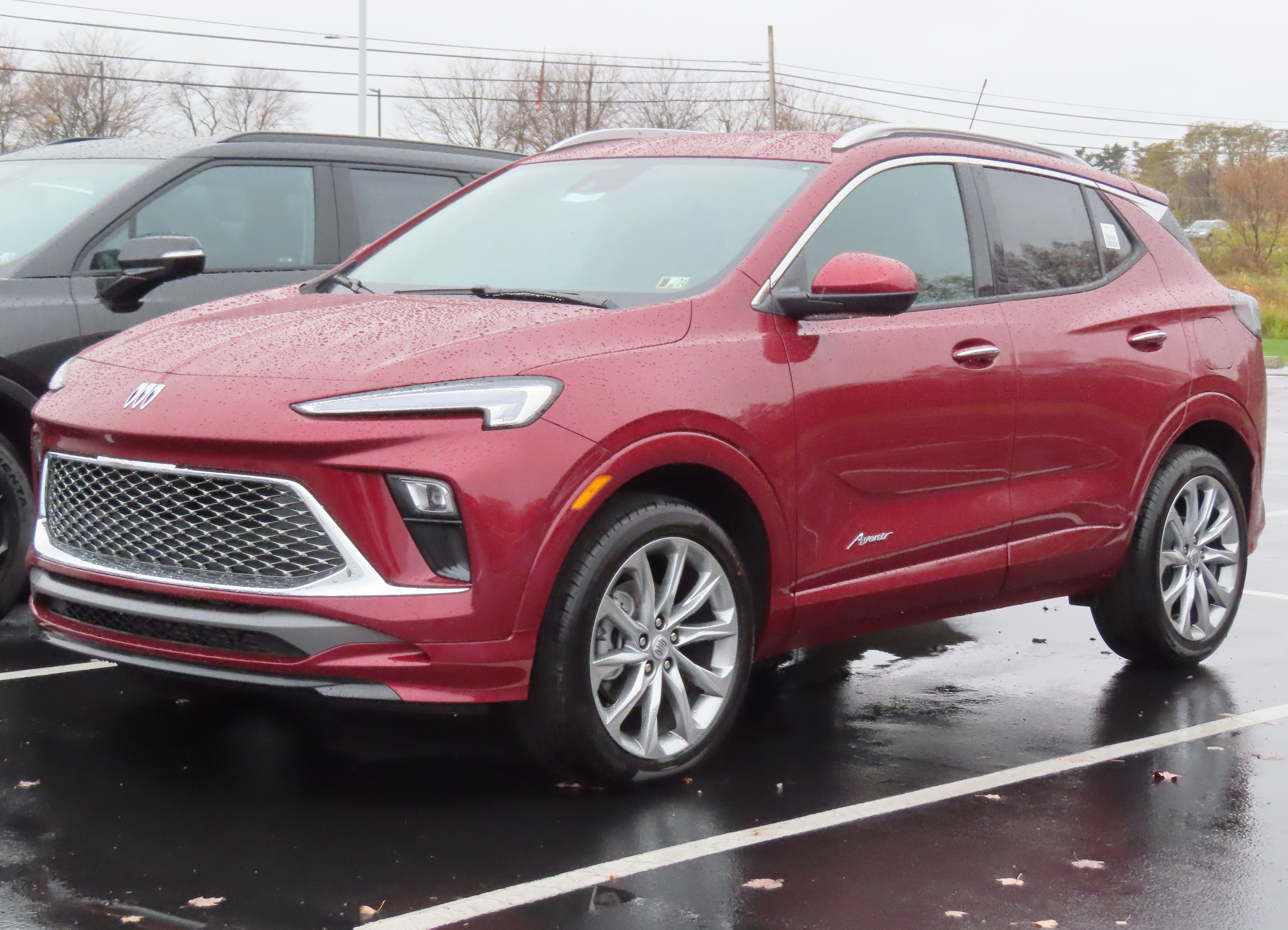
2024 Buick Encore GX Avenir AWD

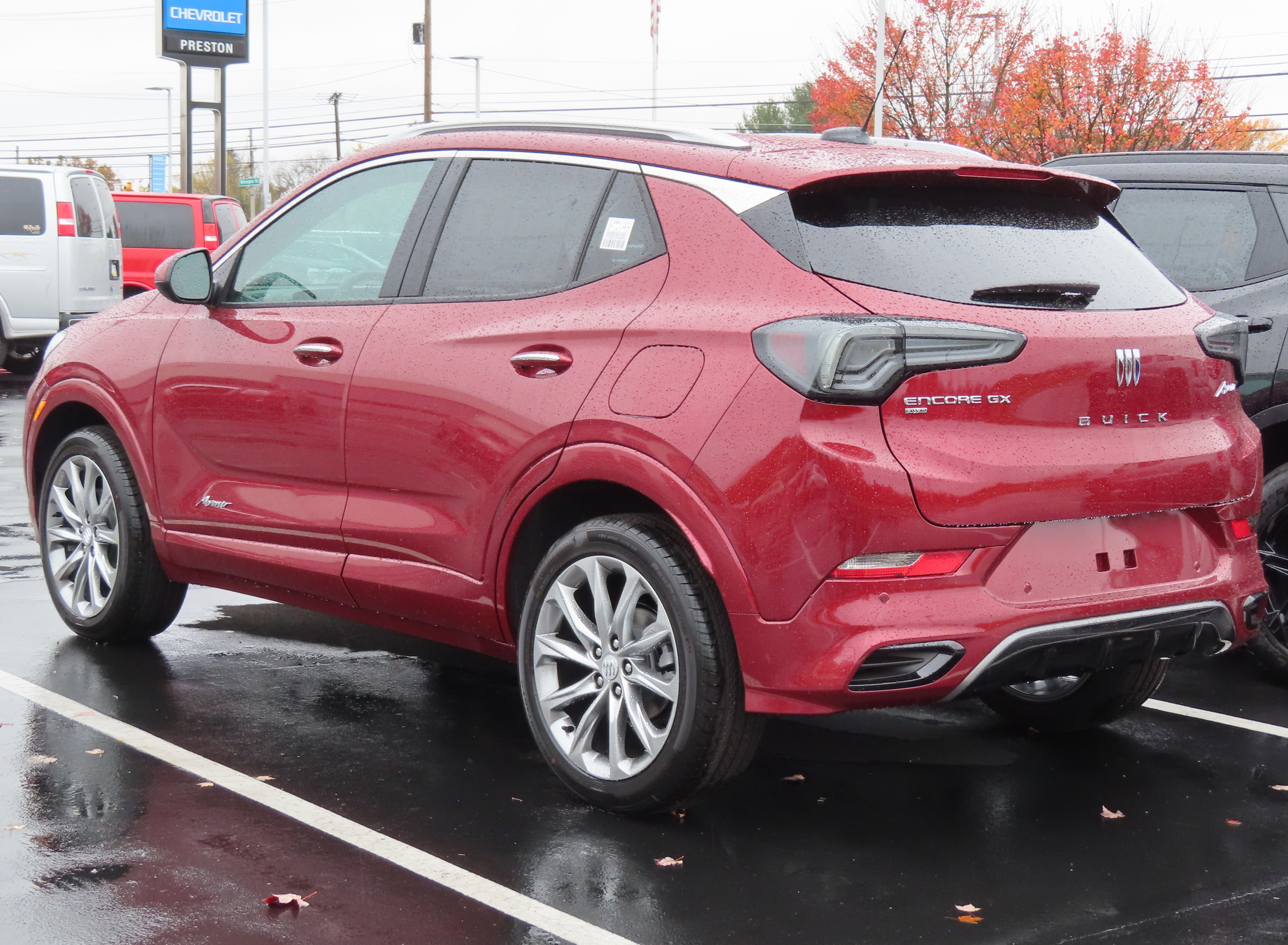
Rear view

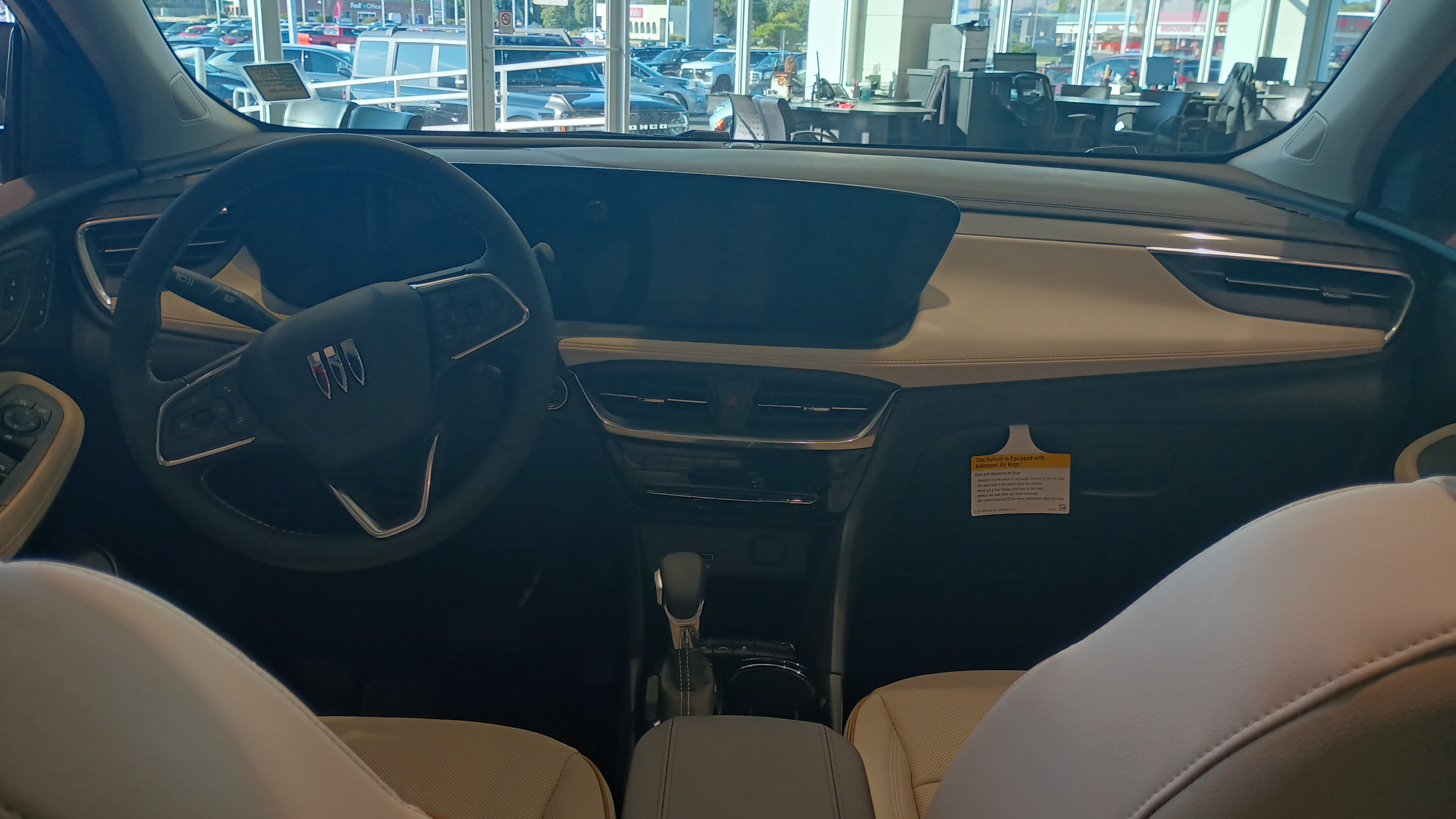
Interior

==== China ====
On August 18, 2023, Buick unveiled the facelifted Encore for the Chinese market. The refresh brings a new powertrain setup, as well as a change in name from Encore GX to Encore Plus. The Encore Plus gains a new 1.5-liter turbocharged four-cylinder engine. Inside, the Encore Plus gains a Virtual Cockpit System specific to the Chinese market, consisting of two 10.5-inch display panels, lacking any physical knobs and buttons, along with new brown upholstery.

Encore Plus was removed from the Buick China website in March 2025.

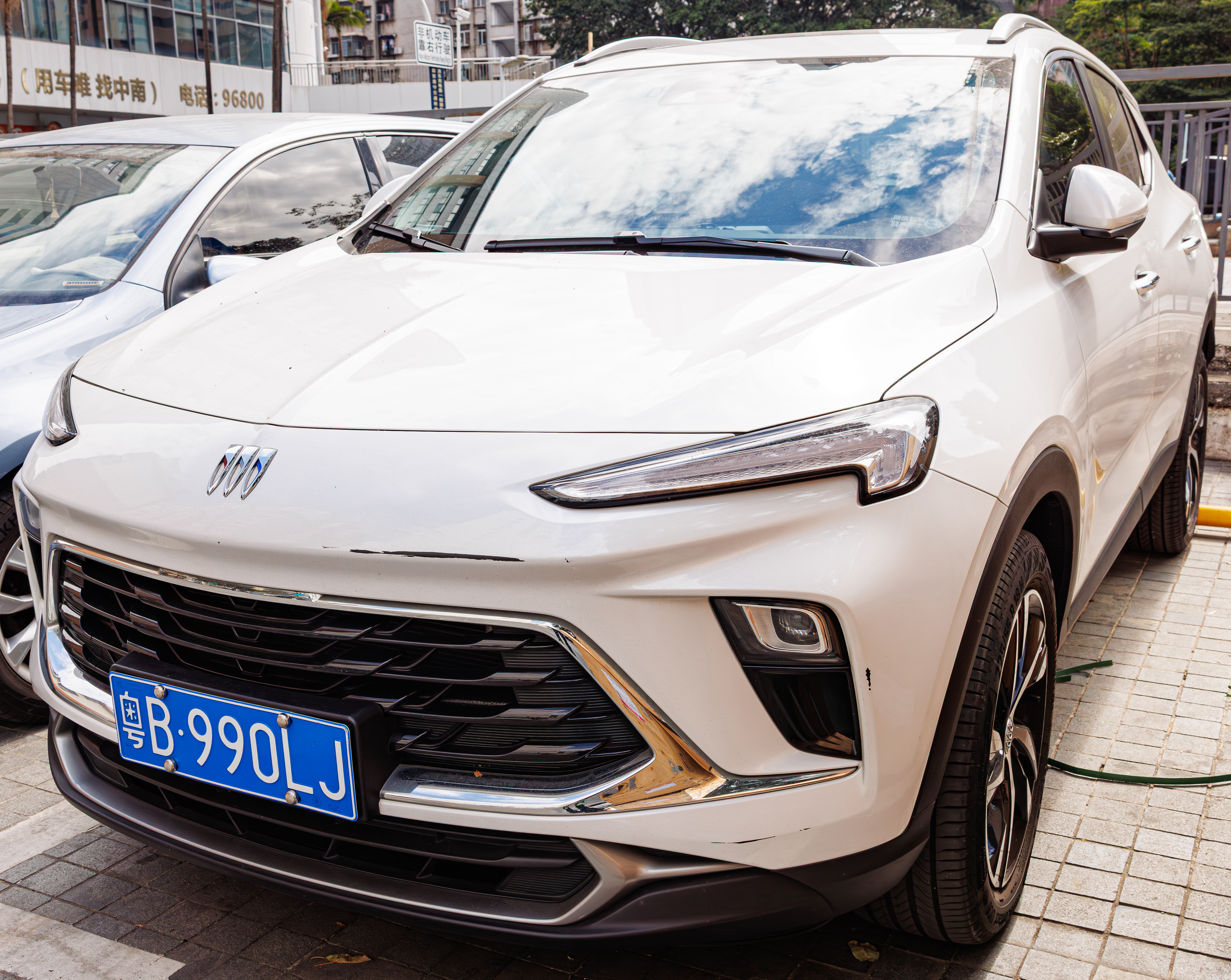
Buick Encore Plus

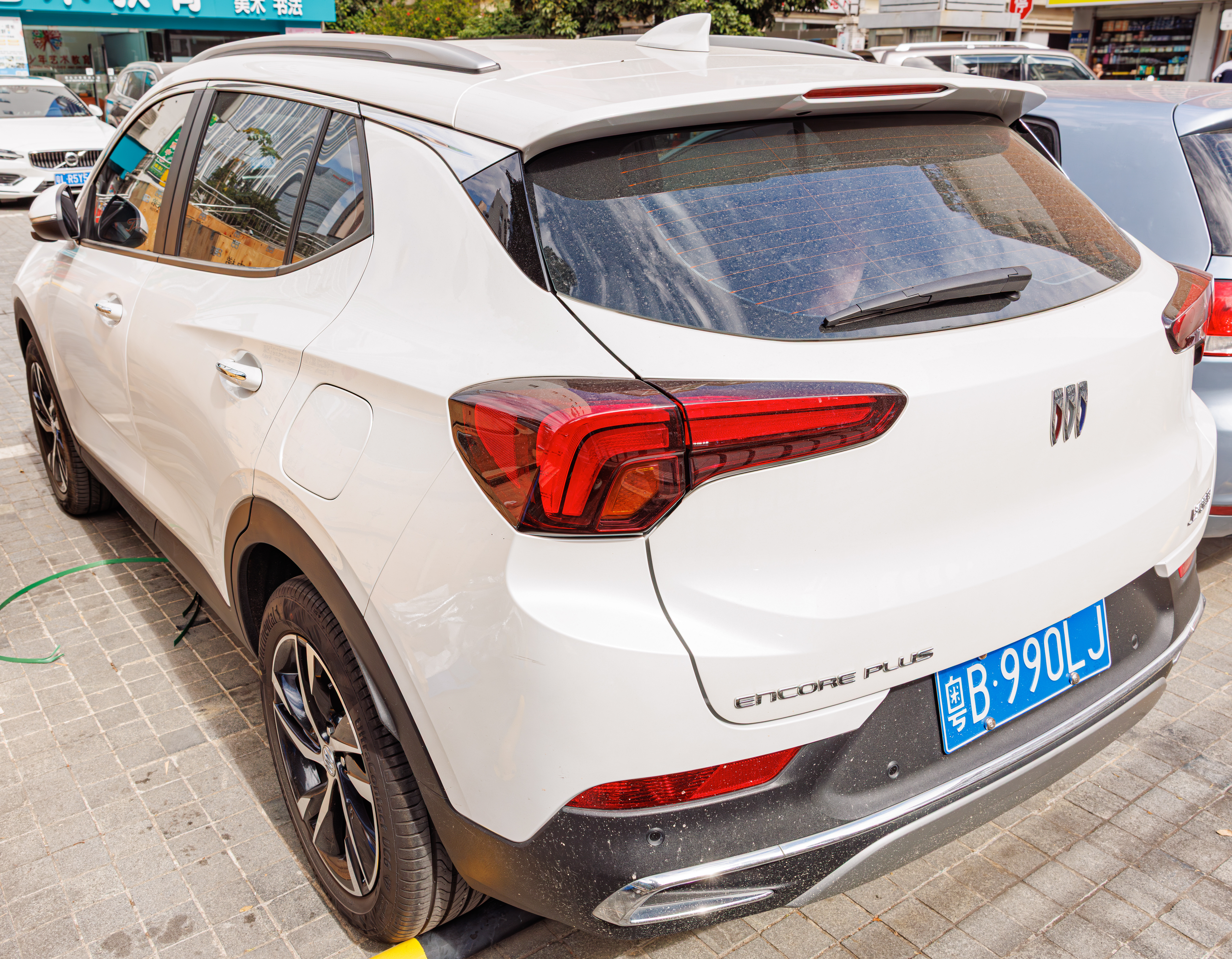
Rear view

== Powertrain ==
Two engines are available. The first, a 1.2-liter, turbocharged 3-cylinder engine producing 137 hp (139 PS; 102 kW) and 162 lb⋅ft (220 N⋅m; 22.4 kg⋅m) torque, is standard on front-wheel-drive models with a CVT. The second, a 1.3-liter, turbocharged 3-cylinder engine producing 155 hp (157 PS; 116 kW) and 174 lb⋅ft (236 N⋅m; 24.1 kg⋅m) torque, is standard on all-wheel-drive models with a 9-speed automatic transmission. It is also available on Select and Essence trims with FWD and the CVT. For 2024-early 2026 models, the 1.2-liter engine is standard on the Preferred trim with the 1.3-liter engine optional, while Sport Touring and Avenir trims get the 1.3-liter engine as standard. In China, only the 1.3-liter engine is available, with an option of FWD and AWD and a higher output at 162 hp (164 PS; 121 kW) and 177 lb⋅ft (240 N⋅m; 24.5 kg⋅m) of torque.

In early 2026, Buick quietly dropped the 1.2L engine, effectively making the 1.3L engine standard across all trim levels.

While the new I3 engines are available in several GM models in China, these are the first three-cylinder engines in a GM car in North America since the 2000 Chevrolet Metro.

| Type | Engine code | Displacement | Power | Torque | Transmission | Layout | Model years |
|---|---|---|---|---|---|---|---|
| Gasoline | LIH | 1,193 cc (1.2 L) I3 turbocharged | 137 hp (139 PS; 102 kW) @ 5,000 rpm | 162 lb⋅ft (220 N⋅m; 22.4 kg⋅m) @ 2,500 rpm | CVT | FWD | 2020–present |
| Gasoline | L3T | 1,338 cc (1.3 L) I3 turbocharged | 155 hp (157 PS; 116 kW) @ 5,600 rpm | 174 lb⋅ft (236 N⋅m; 24.1 kg⋅m) @ 1,600 rpm | CVT | FWD | 2020–present |
| Gasoline | L3T | 1,338 cc (1.3 L) I3 turbocharged | 155 hp (157 PS; 116 kW) @ 5,600 rpm | 174 lb⋅ft (236 N⋅m; 24.1 kg⋅m) @ 1,600 rpm | 9-speed automatic | AWD | 2020–present |
| Gasoline | L3T | 1,338 cc (1.3 L) I3 turbocharged | 162 hp (164 PS; 121 kW) @ 5,600 rpm | 177 lb⋅ft (240 N⋅m; 24.5 kg⋅m) @ 1,500–4,000 rpm | CVT | FWD | 2020–present (China) |
| Gasoline | L3T | 1,338 cc (1.3 L) I3 turbocharged | 162 hp (164 PS; 121 kW) @ 5,600 rpm | 177 lb⋅ft (240 N⋅m; 24.5 kg⋅m) @ 1,500–4,000 rpm | 9-speed automatic | AWD | 2020–present (China) |

== Awards ==
U.S. News & World Report ranked the Buick Encore GX at No. 5 on its list of Best Subcompact SUVs for 2022, giving it a score of 8.1 out of 10.

== Safety ==
The 2021 model year Encore GX was awarded "Top Safety Pick" by IIHS. Unlike the Trailblazer, it did not receive the highest "Top Safety Pick+" award, as the lower two trims of the Encore GX used halogen reflectors headlights received a Marginal rating.

IIHS scores (2021)
| Small overlap front (driver) | Good | |
| Small overlap front (passenger) | Good | |
| Moderate overlap front (original test) | Good | |
| Side (original test) | Good | |
| Roof strength | Good | |
| Head restraints and seats | Good | |
| Headlights | Acceptable | Marginal |
| Front crash prevention: vehicle-to-vehicle | Superior | |
| Front crash prevention: vehicle-to-pedestrian (Day) | Superior | |
| Child seat anchors (LATCH) ease of use | Acceptable | |

== Sales ==
| Calendar year | United States | China | Canada | Mexico |
|---|---|---|---|---|
| 2020 | 44,841 | 17,582 | 5,214 | 1,091 |
| 2021 | 71,247 | 4,677 | 6,959 | 1,070 |
| 2022 | 33,348 | 9,268 | 5,091 | 724 |
| 2023 | 64,149 | 2,264 | 7,017 | 996 |
| 2024 | 58,239 | 1,432 | 7,526 | 646 |
| 2025 | 57,528 | | 7,759 | 443 |
