= Buick Verano (China) =

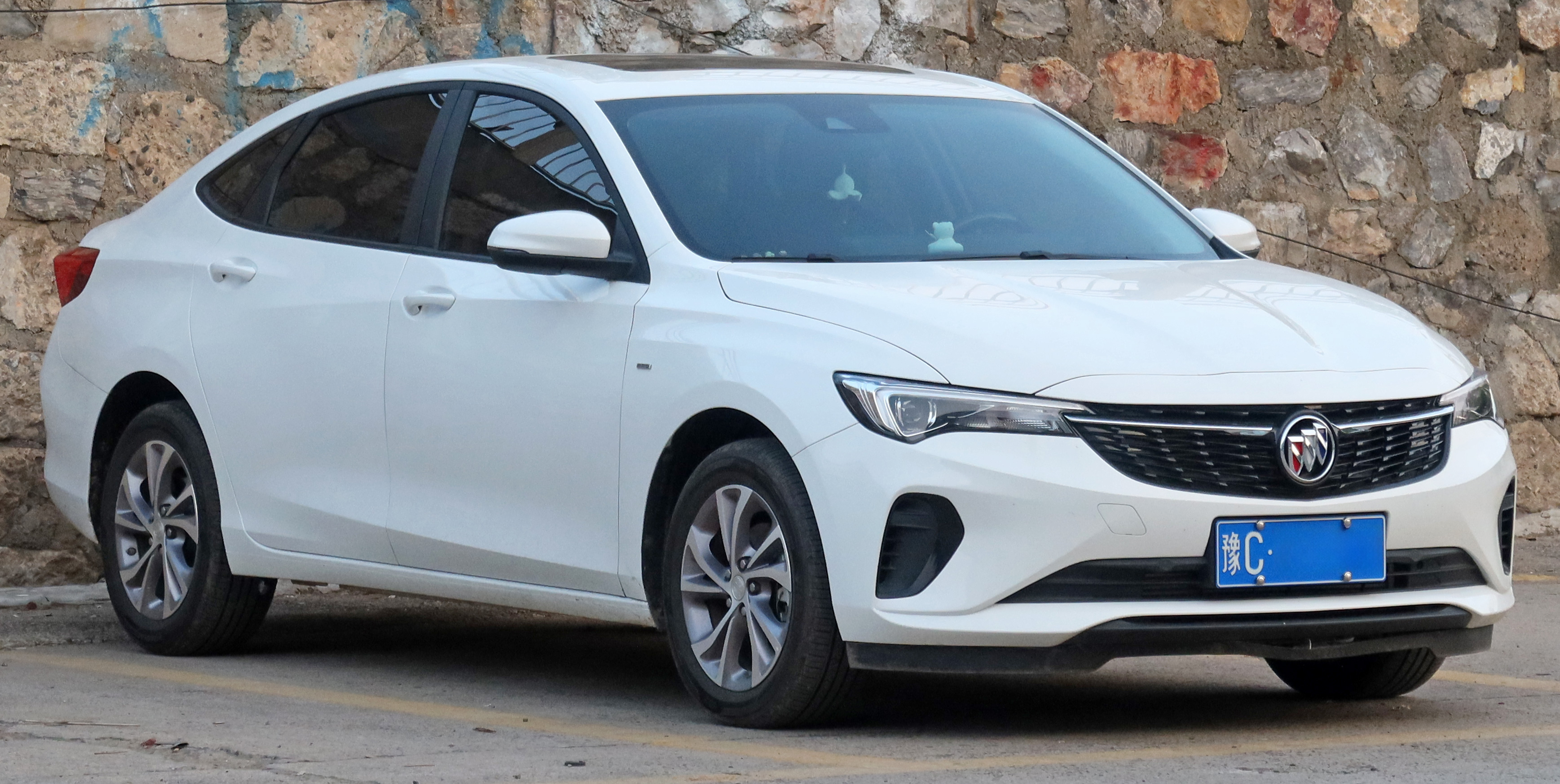
- 2022 Buick Verano Pro

Overview
- Manufacturer: Buick
- Production: 2015–present

Body and chassis
- Class: Compact car
- Layout: Front-engine, front-wheel drive

The Buick Verano (Chinese: 威朗; pinyin: Wēi lǎng) is a compact car manufactured by SAIC-GM for the GM's Buick brand since 2015.

== Buick Verano (2016) ==
Buick Verano
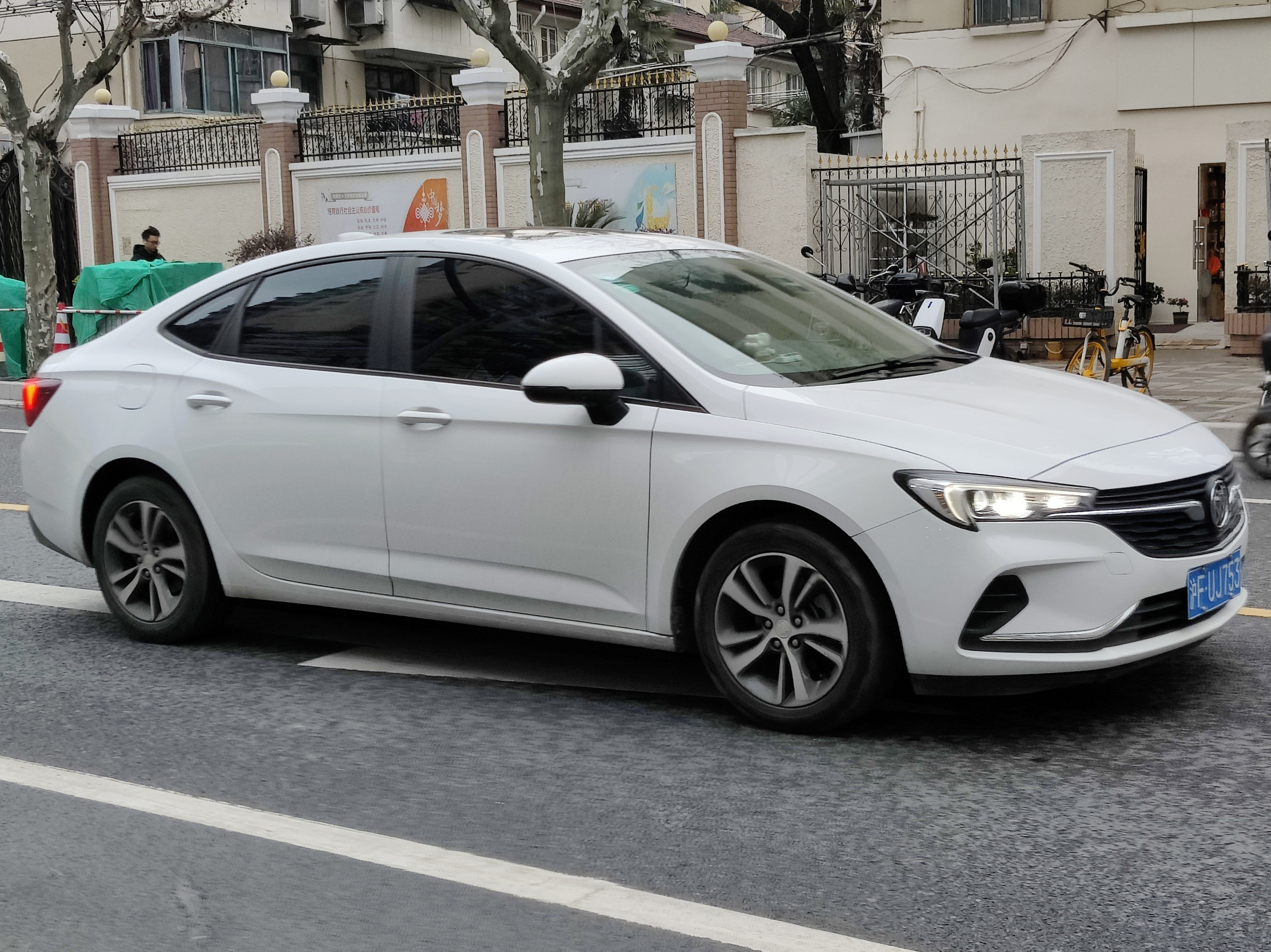
- 2020 Buick Verano

Overview
- Also called: Opel Astra (hatchback; Europe); Vauxhall Astra (hatchback; United Kingdom); Holden Astra (hatchback; Australia)
- Production: 2015–2021
- Assembly: China: Shenyang, Liaoning (SAIC-GM Norsom Motors)
- Designer: Yin He (sedan); Uwe Müller (hatchback)

Body and chassis
- Body style: 4-door sedan 5-door hatchback
- Layout: Front-engine, front-wheel drive
- Platform: D2XX platform
- Related: Buick Envision; Chevrolet Cruze; Opel Astra K Vauxhall Astra; Holden Astra BK; Buick Excelle GT (Second generation); Buick Excelle GX

Powertrain
- Engine: 1.0 L LIV I3 (turbo gasoline); 1.3 L L3Z I3 (turbo gasoline); 1.5 L LFV turbo I4 (gasoline); 1.5 L L2B I4 (gasoline)
- Transmission: 6-speed manual; 6-speed automatic; 7-speed dual-clutch; CVT

Dimensions
- Wheelbase: 2,700 mm (106.3 in)
- Length: 2016–19: 4,718 mm (185.7 in); 2020–21: 4,723 mm (185.9 in)
- Width: 1,802 mm (70.9 in)
- Height: 1,466 mm (57.7 in)
- Curb weight: 2016–19: 1,260–1,320 kg (2,780–2,910 lb); 2020–21: 1,310–1,350 kg (2,890–2,980 lb)

The Verano was introduced on 27 July 2015 in the Chinese market. It is sold in both sedan and hatchback body styles.

=== Powertrain ===
The 2.0T model is equipped with the GM Ecotec 1.5-litre Turbo SIDI engine mated to the 7-speed DCG dual-clutch transmission. Acceleration from 0 to 100 kilometres per hour (0 to 62 mph) is 8.8 seconds, and the fuel consumption is 6.1 L/100 km (46 mpg_{‑imp}; 39 mpg_{‑US}). The 15S model is equipped with the GM 1.5-litre SIDI inline-4 engine mated to the 6-speed DSS transmission, and the fuel consumption is 5.9 L/100 km (48 mpg_{‑imp}; 40 mpg_{‑US}).

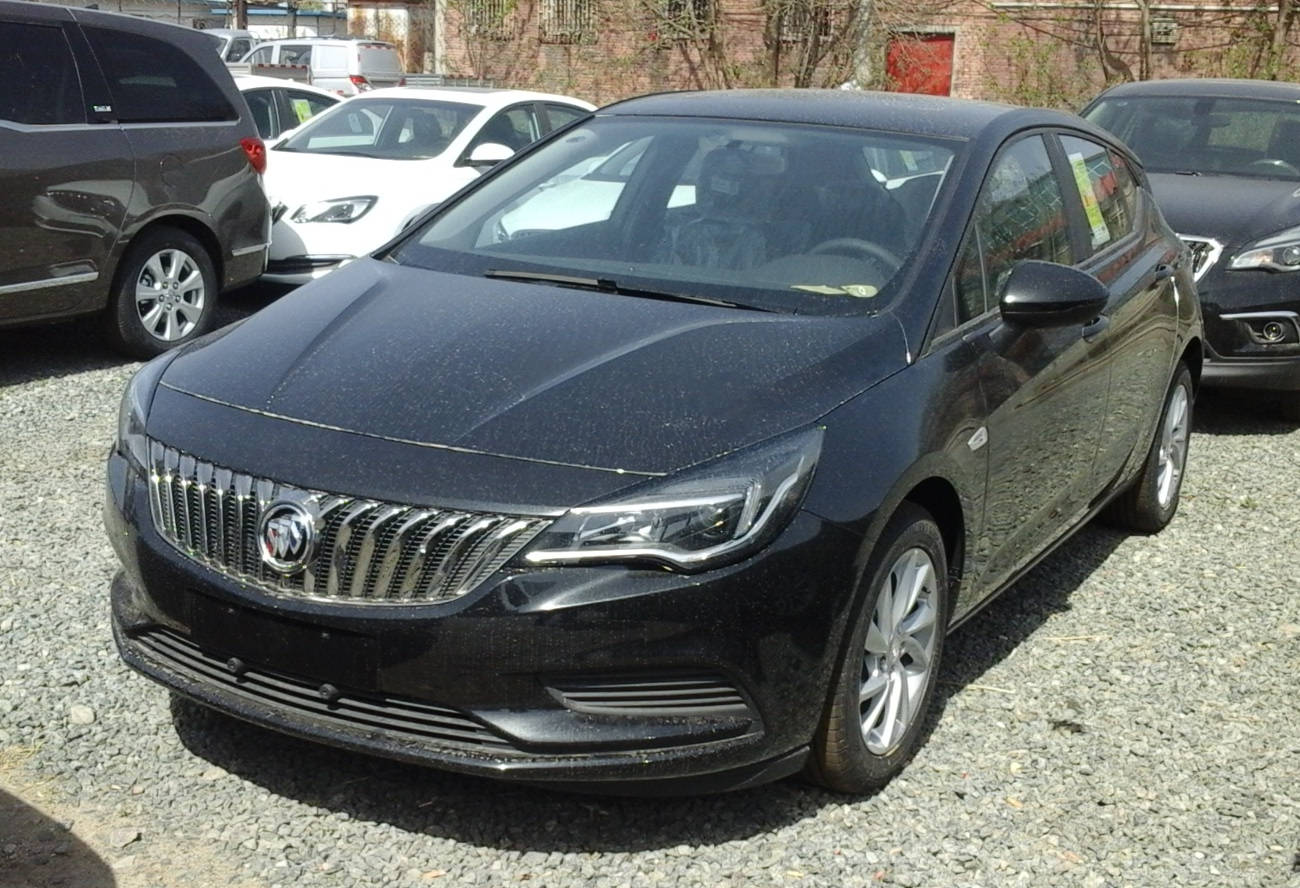
Front view (hatchback, pre-facelift)

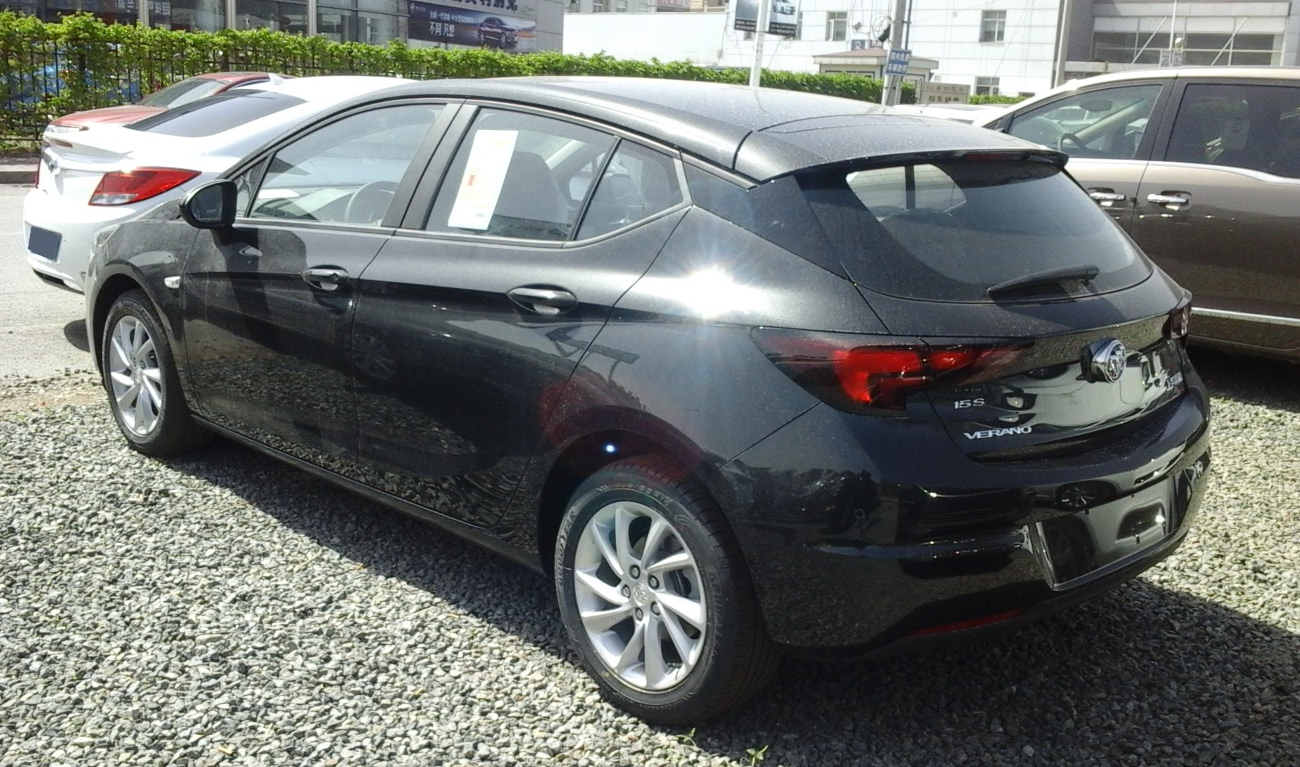
Rear view (hatchback, pre-facelift)

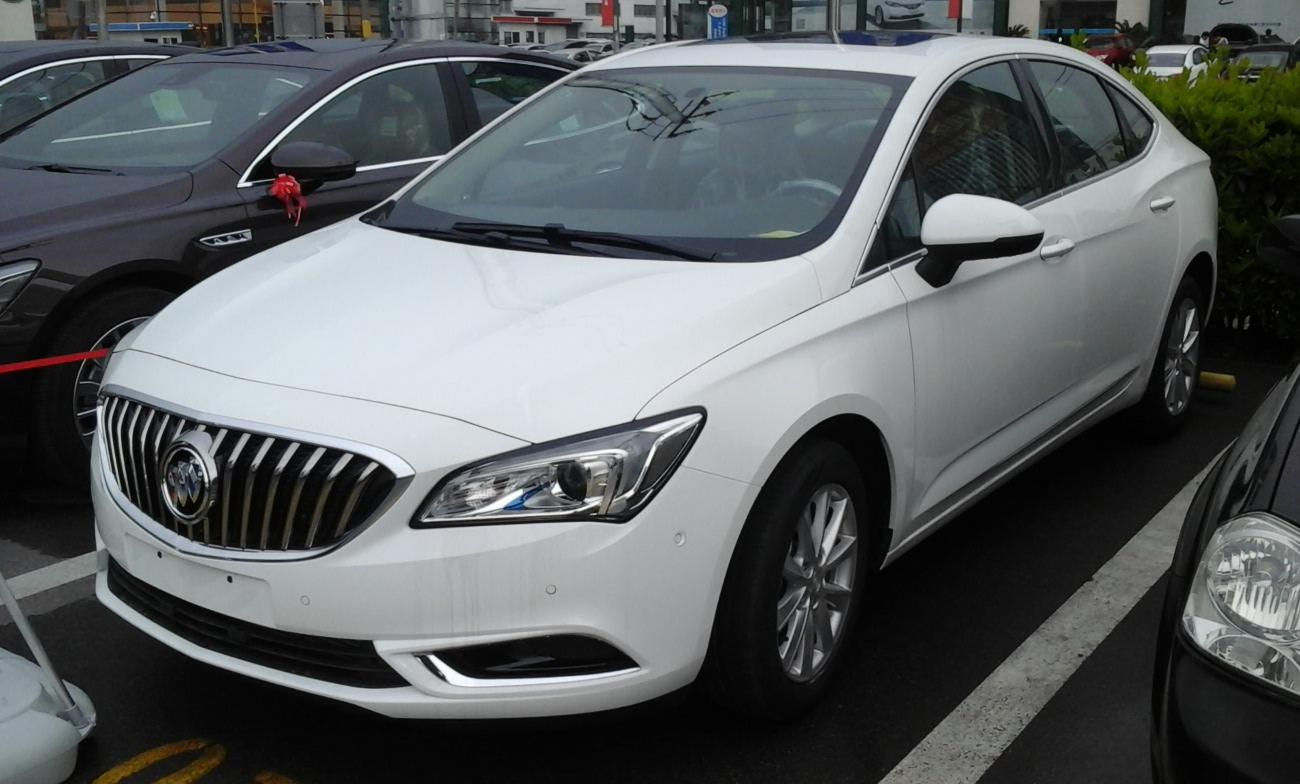
Front view (sedan, pre-facelift)

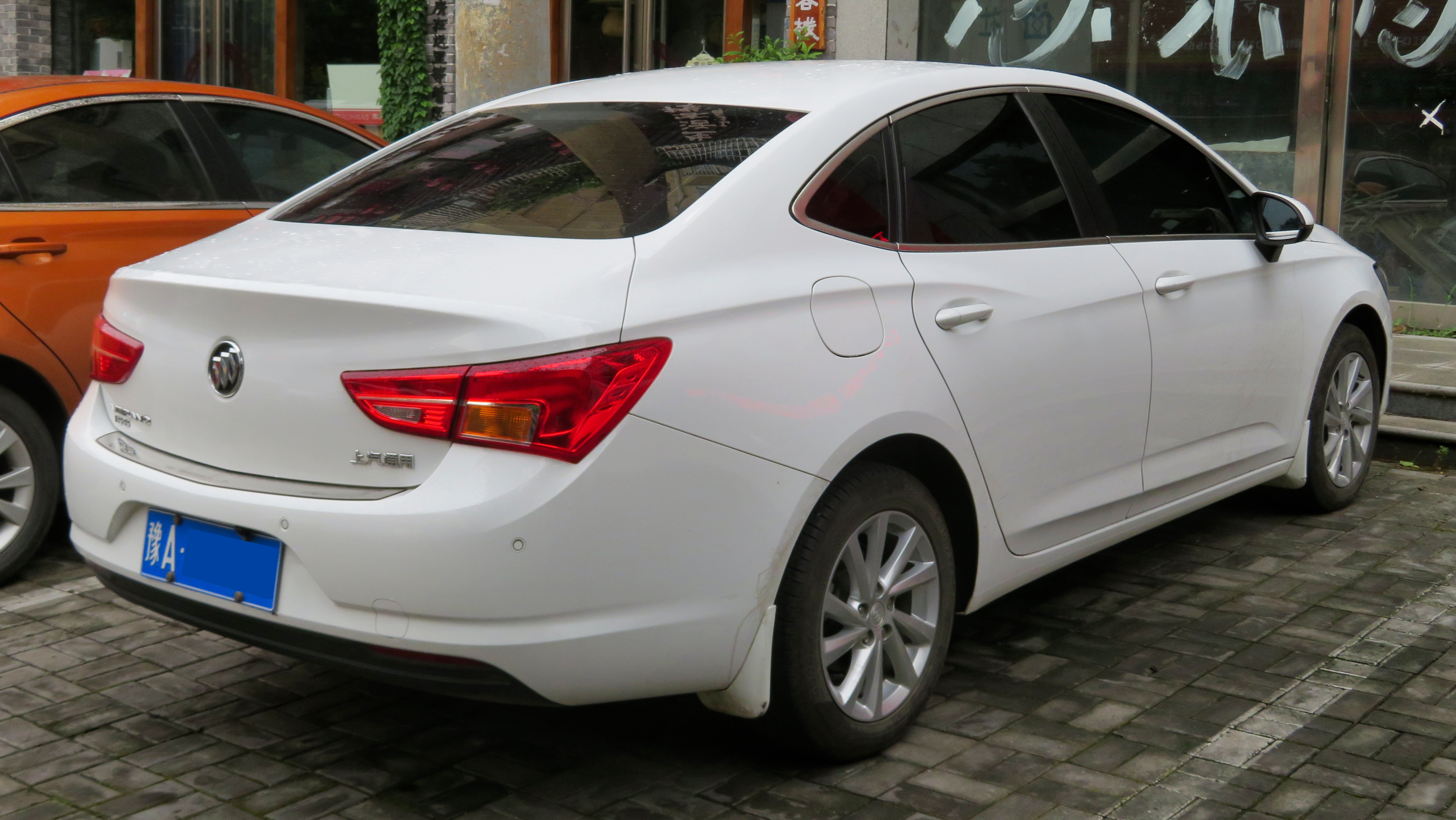
Rear view (sedan, pre-facelift)

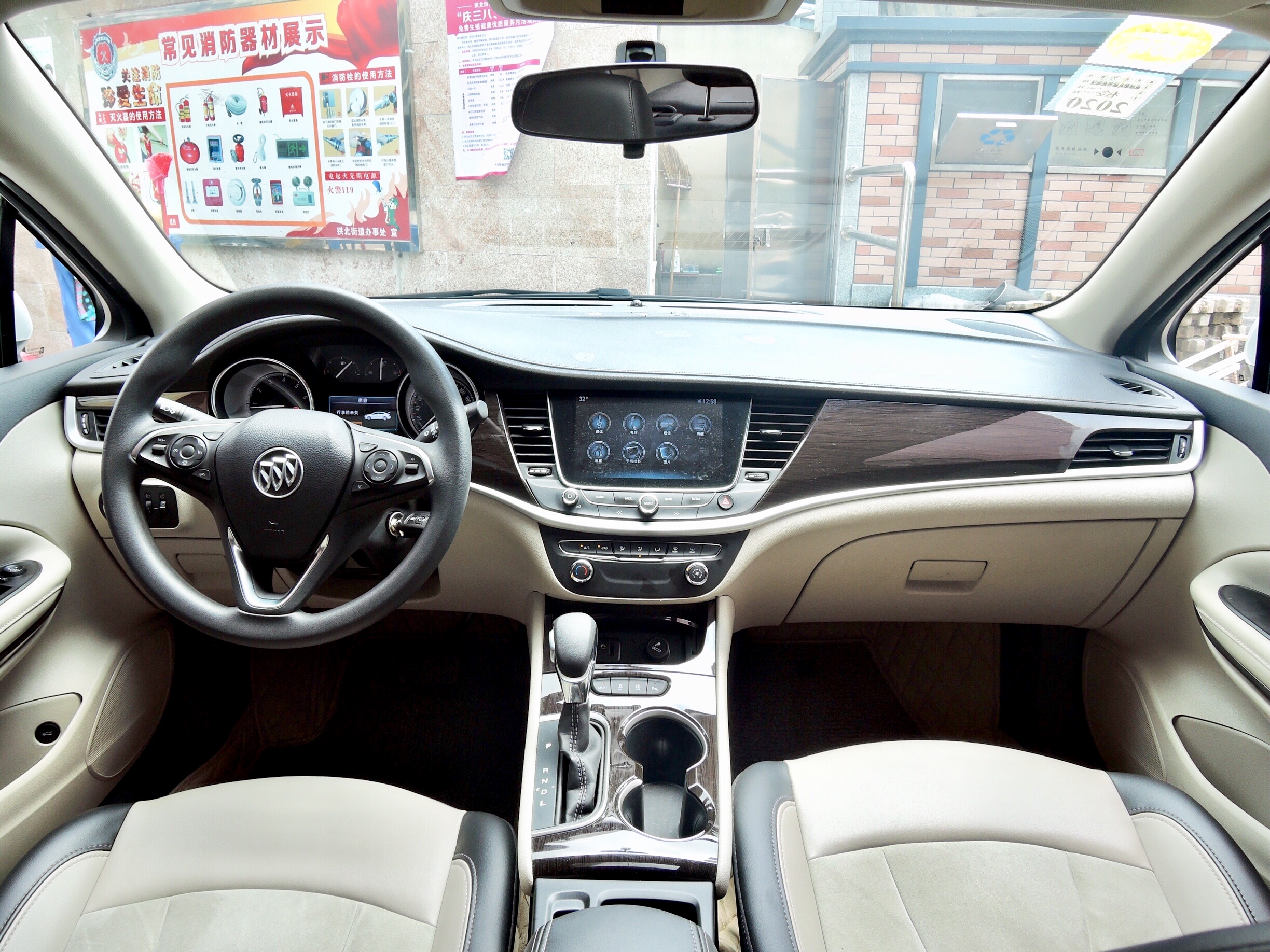
Interior

=== Verano GS ===
A performance GS variant based on the cancelled Opel Astra OPC debuted at the 2015 Guangzhou Auto Show on November 20, 2015, and went on sale in China at the end of the year. Available in hatchback form, the Verano GS is powered by a turbocharged 1.5-litre inline-4 rated at 167 hp (125 kW; 169 PS). with a 7-speed dual-clutch gearbox. Unique aesthetic features include red accents and black chrome wheels.

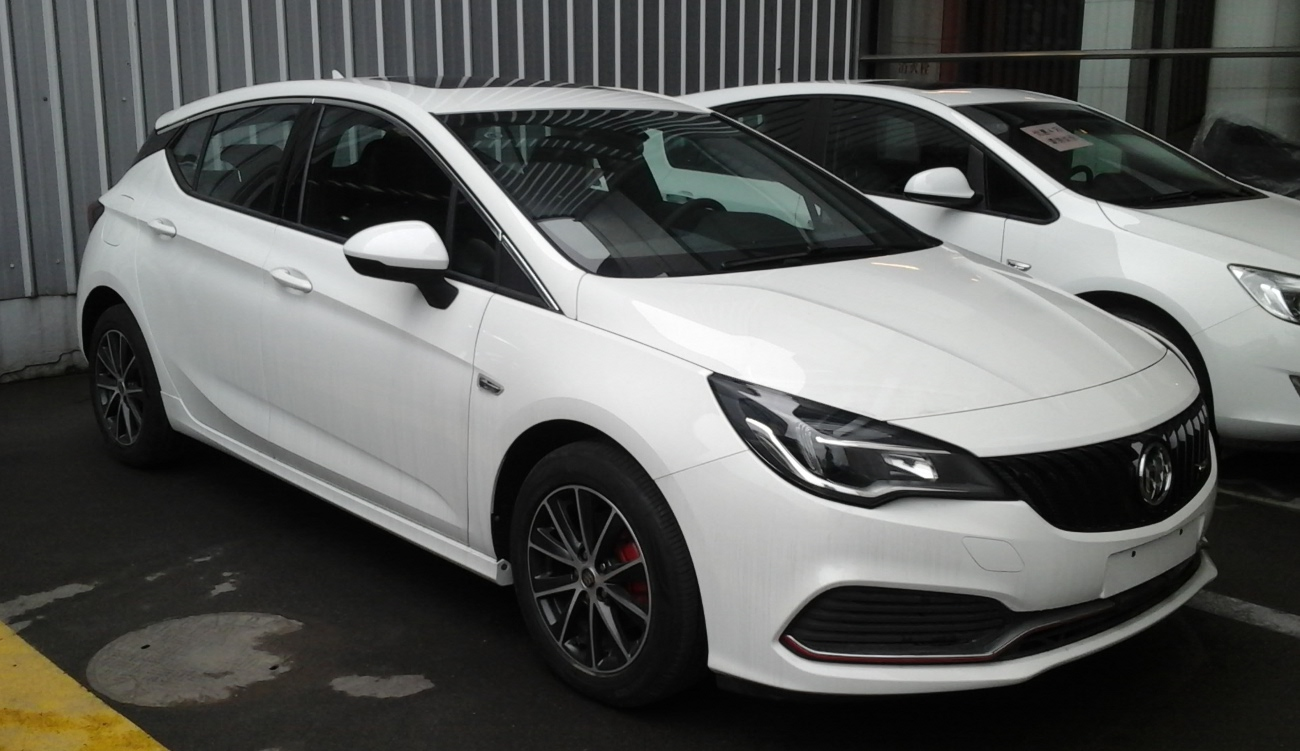
Front view (hatchback)

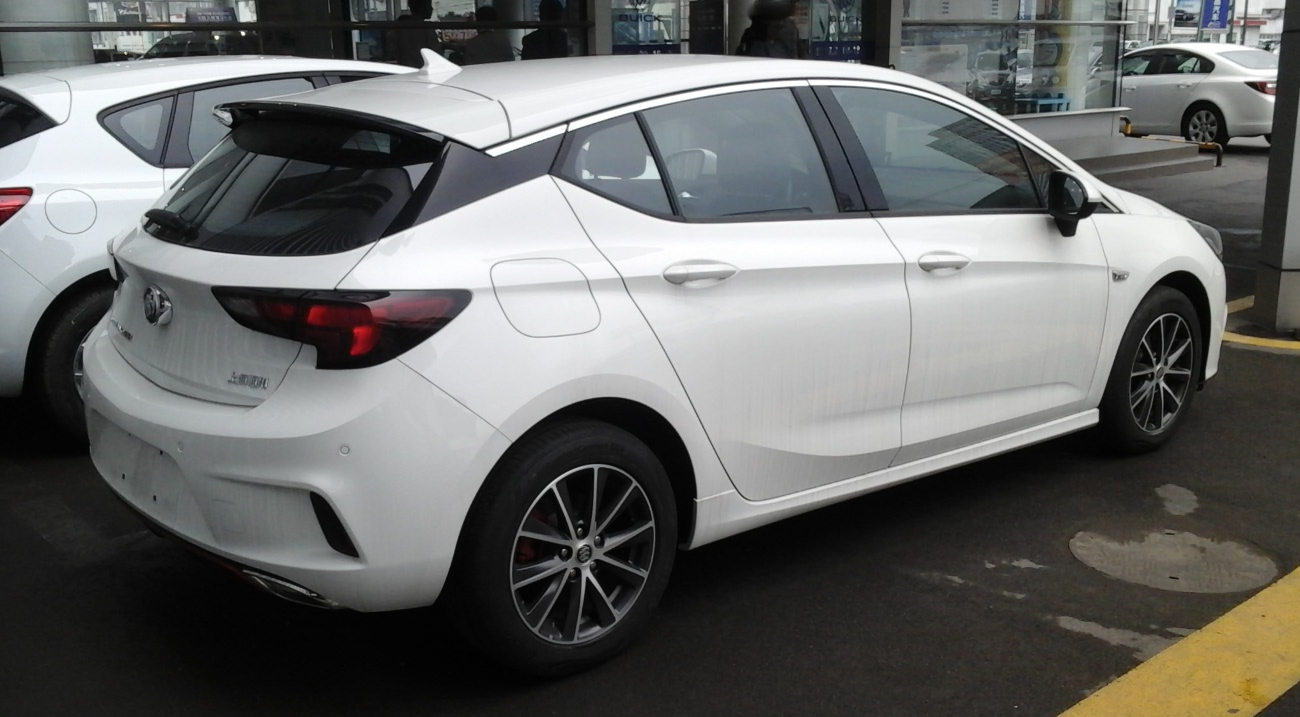
Rear view (hatchback)

=== First facelift (2018) ===
In late 2017, Buick updated the Verano with a revised grille. The update applies to the Buick Verano sedan, Verano hatchback, and Excelle GT sedan. A station wagon variant was added to the lineup.

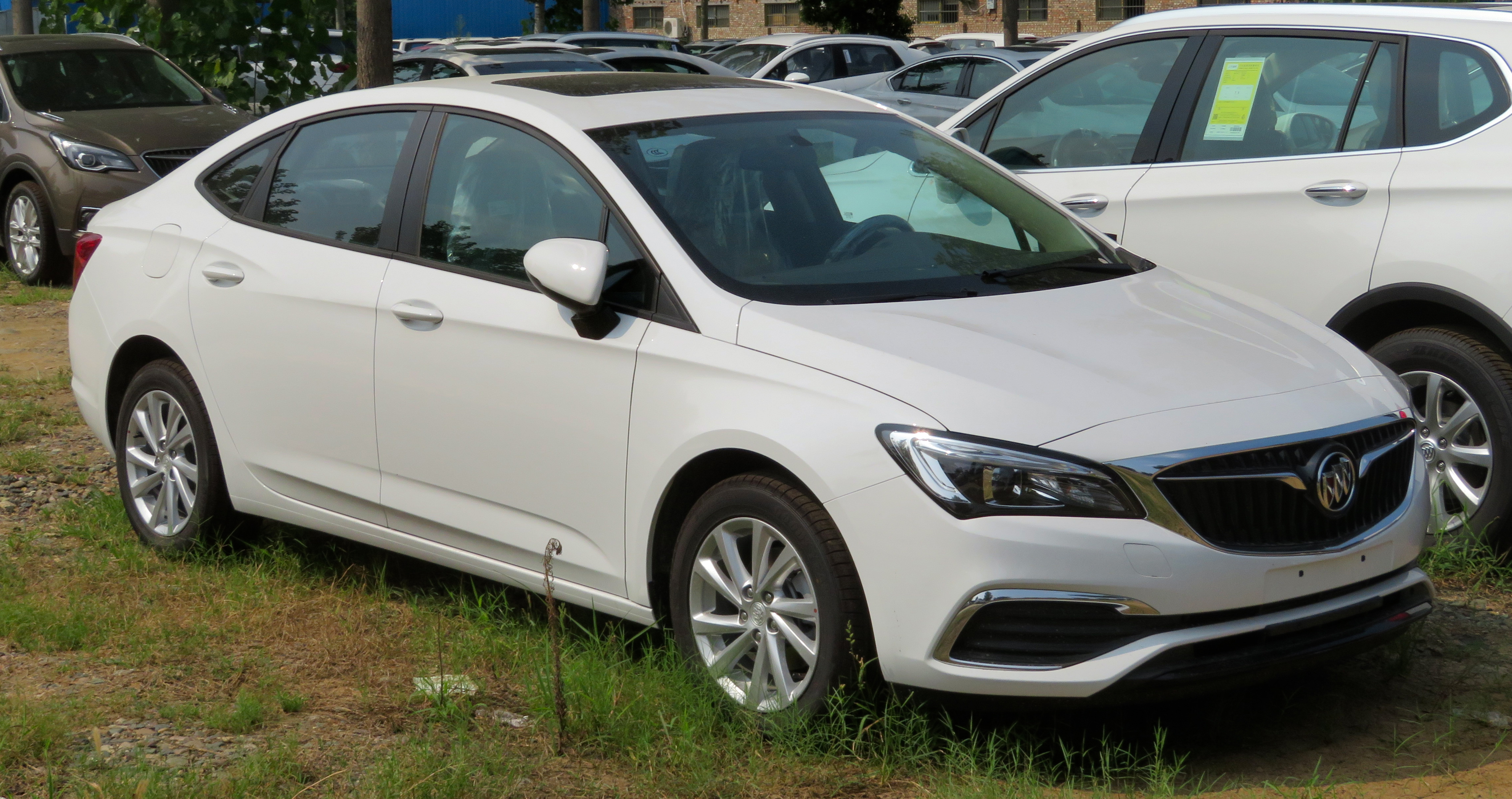
Front view (sedan, first facelift)

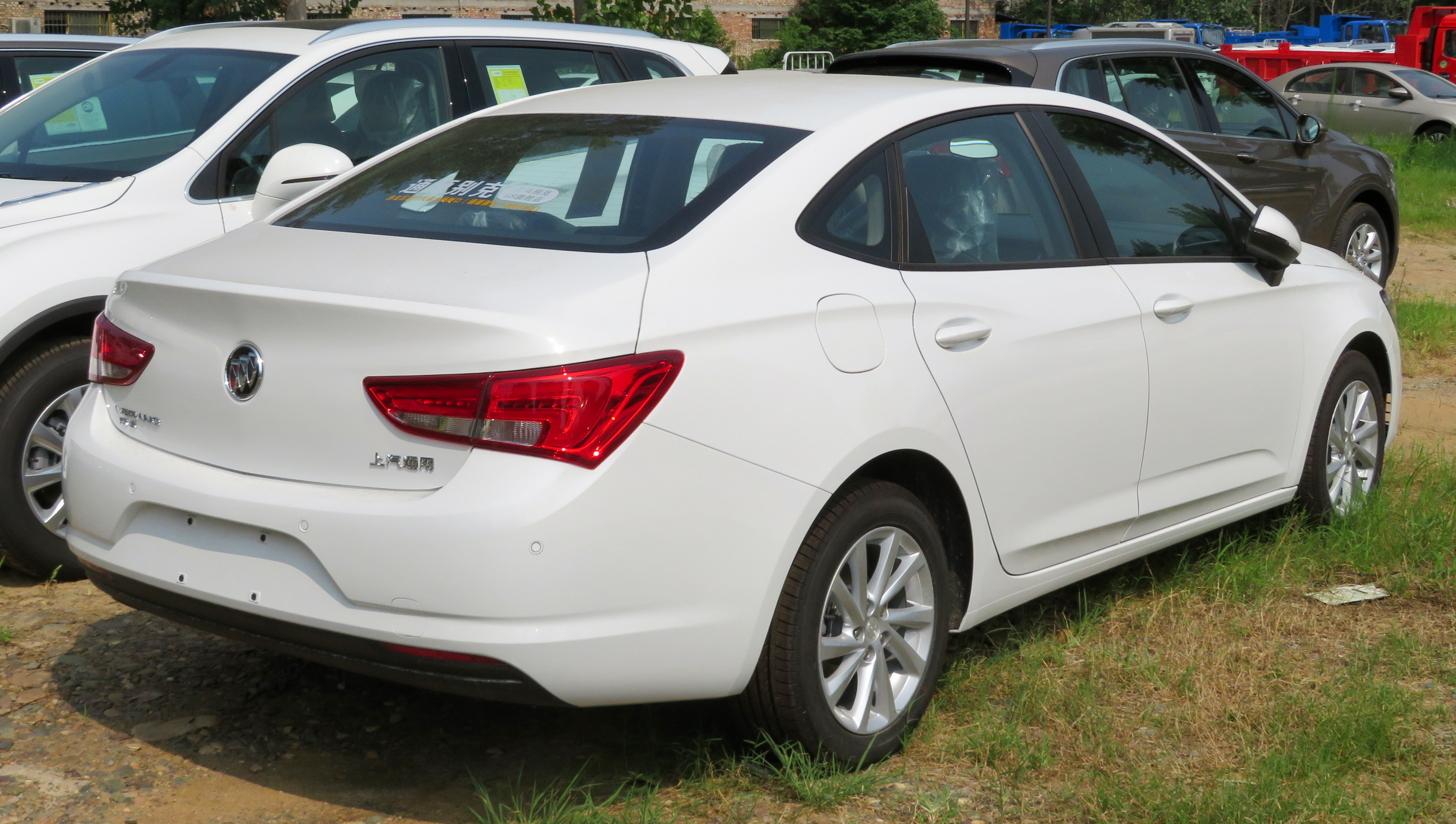
Rear view (sedan, first facelift)

=== Second facelift (2020) ===
A more significant update to the second-generation Verano was launched in September 2019. Although Buick called it "all new", only the front and back of the exterior were changed, along with minor interior changes, and new engine/transmission options.

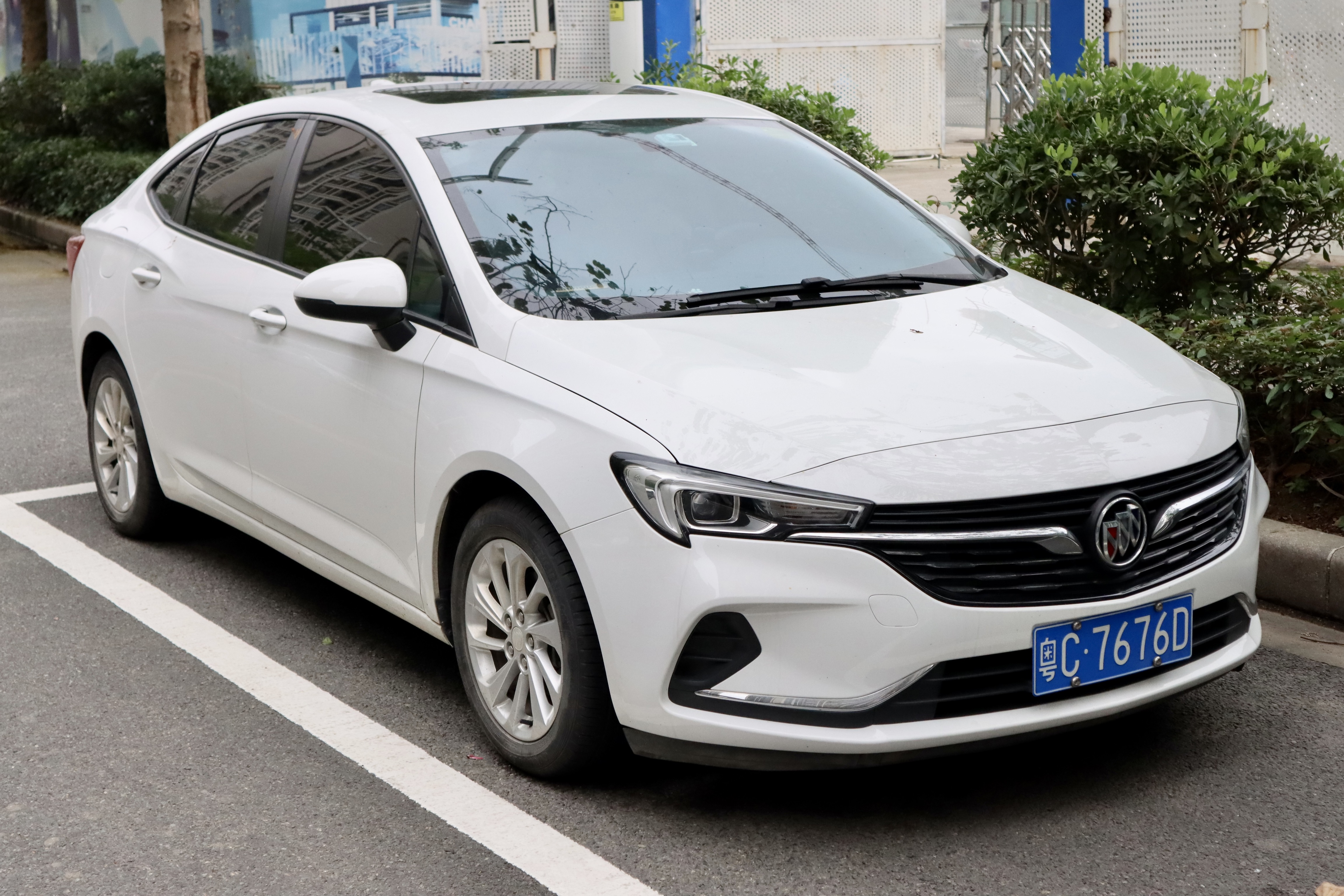
Front view (sedan, second facelift)

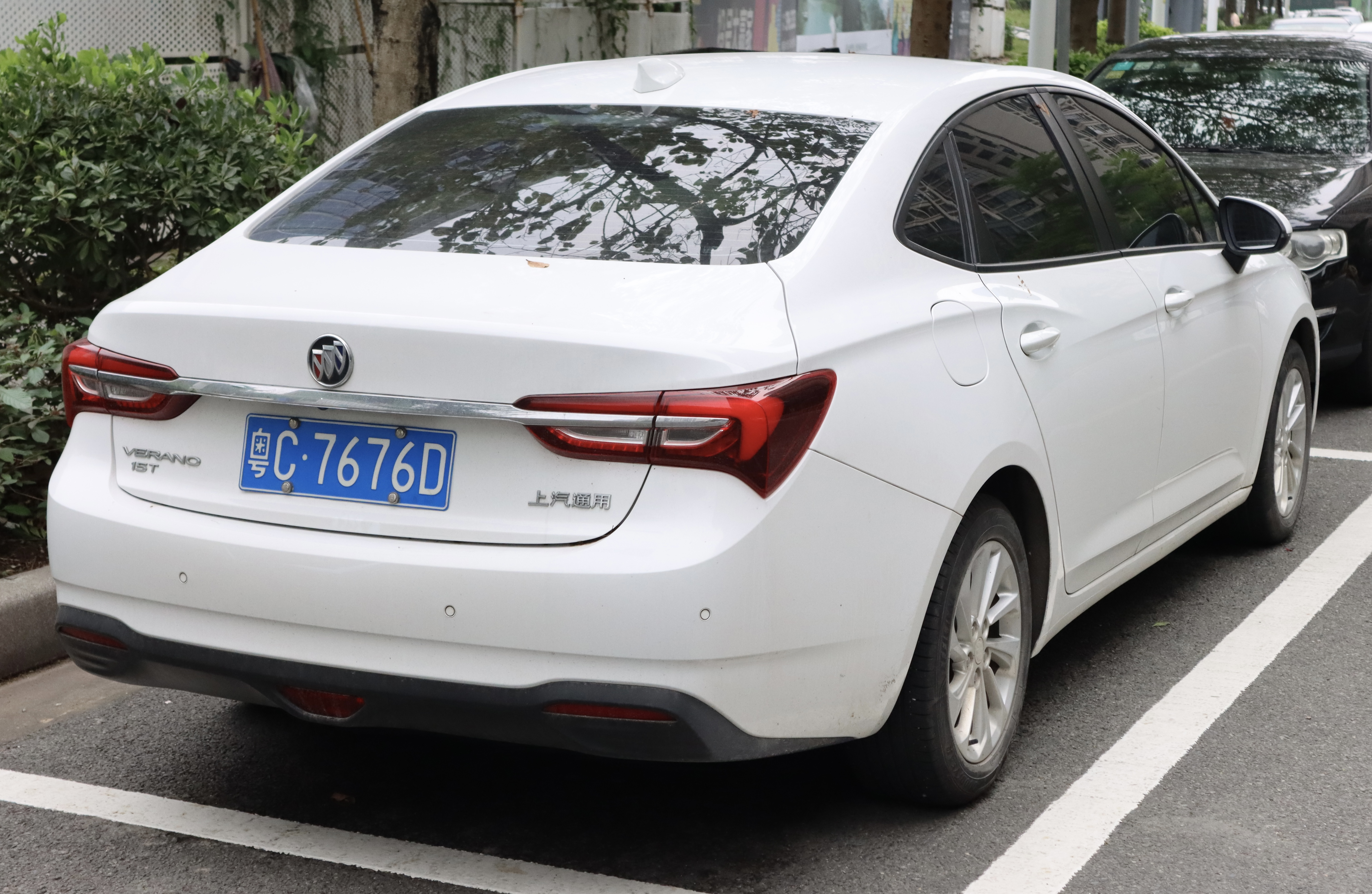
Rear view (sedan, second facelift)

=== Engines ===
Gasoline engine
Engine	Displacement	Power	Torque	Transmission	Years
1.5 L SIDI I4 w/ auto-s/s	1490 cc	87 kW (117 hp) at 6600 rpm	146 N⋅m (108 ft⋅lb) at 4000 rpm	6-speed automatic 6-speed manual	2016–2019
1.5 L SIDI turbo I4 w/ auto-s/s	1490 cc	124 kW (166 hp; 169 PS) at 5600 rpm	250 N⋅m (184 lb⋅ft; 25 kg⋅m) at 1700–4400 rpm	7-speed automatic	2016–2019
1.0 L turbo I3 w/ auto-s/s	999 cc	92 kW (123 hp; 125 PS) at 5800 rpm	180 N⋅m (133 lb⋅ft; 18 kg⋅m) at 1350–4500 rpm	6-speed automatic	2020–
1.3 L turbo I3 w/ auto-s/s	1341 cc	121 kW (162 hp; 165 PS) at 5600 rpm	240 N⋅m (177 lb⋅ft; 24 kg⋅m) at 1500–4000 rpm	CVT	2020–

== Buick Verano Pro (2021) ==
Buick Verano Pro
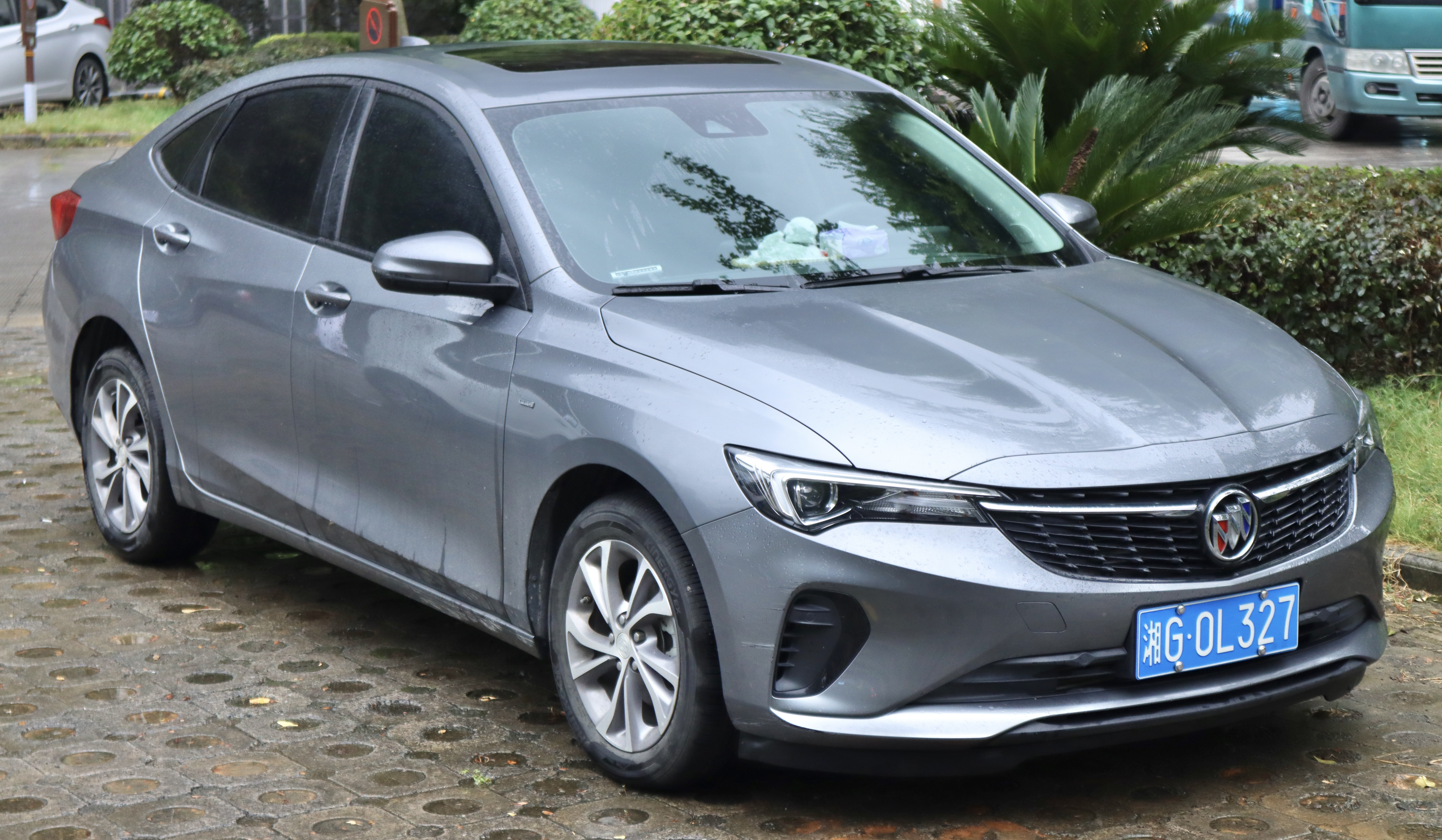
- Buick Verano Pro

Overview
- Model code: JCSB
- Production: 2021–present
- Assembly: China: Wuhan (SAIC-GM Wuhan Branch)

Body and chassis
- Body style: 4-door sedan
- Layout: Front-engine, front-wheel drive
- Platform: GM VSS-F platform (9BXX)

Powertrain
- Engine: 1.5 L LAH turbo I4 (gasoline)
- Transmission: CVT

Dimensions
- Wheelbase: 2,700 mm (106.3 in)
- Length: 4,664 mm (183.6 in)
- Width: 1,786 mm (70.3 in)
- Height: 1,472 mm (58.0 in)
- Curb weight: 1,315–1,335 kg (2,899–2,943 lb)

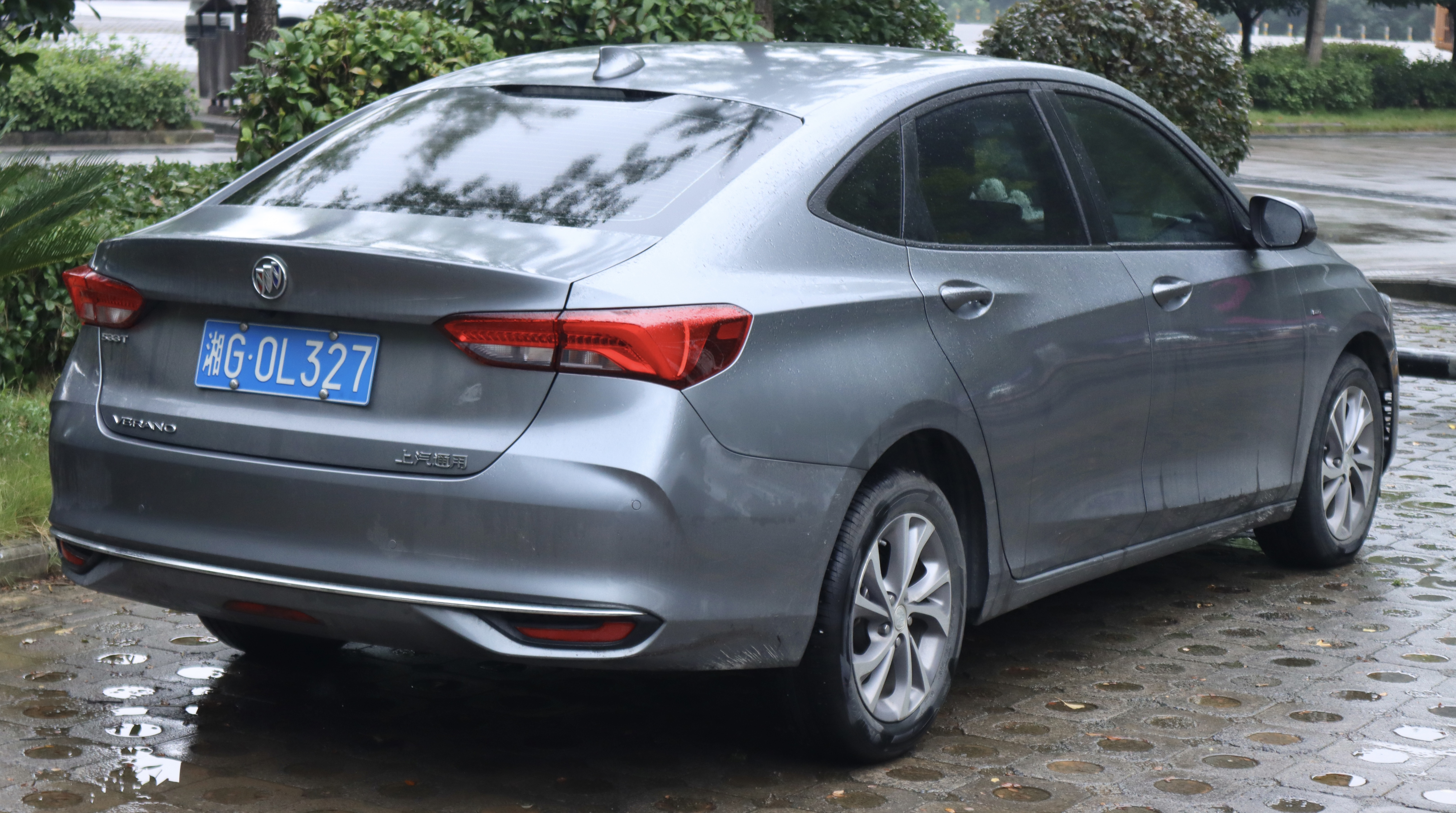
Rear view

The Buick Verano Pro was first leaked in late 2019, with the front and rear being very similar to the previous post-facelift model and the A-pillars being pushed back. The actual production vehicle was officially launched during the 2021 Shanghai Autoshow during April 2021 as the Buick Verano Pro, with the GS performance model being one of the first versions to be launched. The Buick Verano Pro was developed by PATAC of SAIC-GM. Its codename is JCSB , which indicates Verano Pro belongs to GEM platform according to this codename. It is powered by a new 1.5-litre turbocharged 4-cylinder engine, producing 135 kW (181 hp; 184 PS) and 250 N⋅m (184 lb⋅ft; 25 kg⋅m) torque.

=== Buick Verano Pro GS ===
Despite the previous GS trim being performance variants, the Buick Verano Pro GS remains to be an appearance package which includes darkened exterior touches and sportier looking front and rear bumpers.

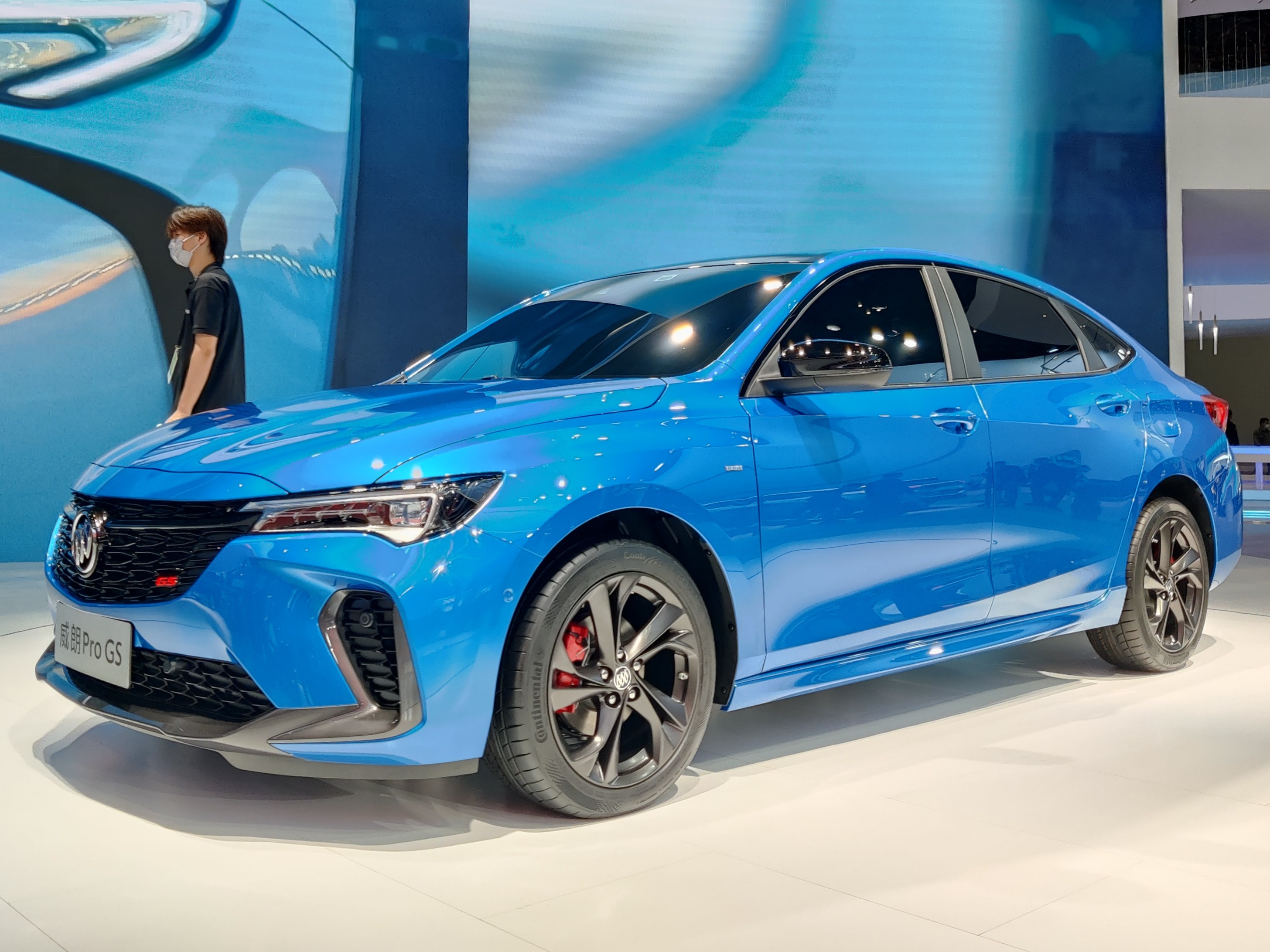
Front view

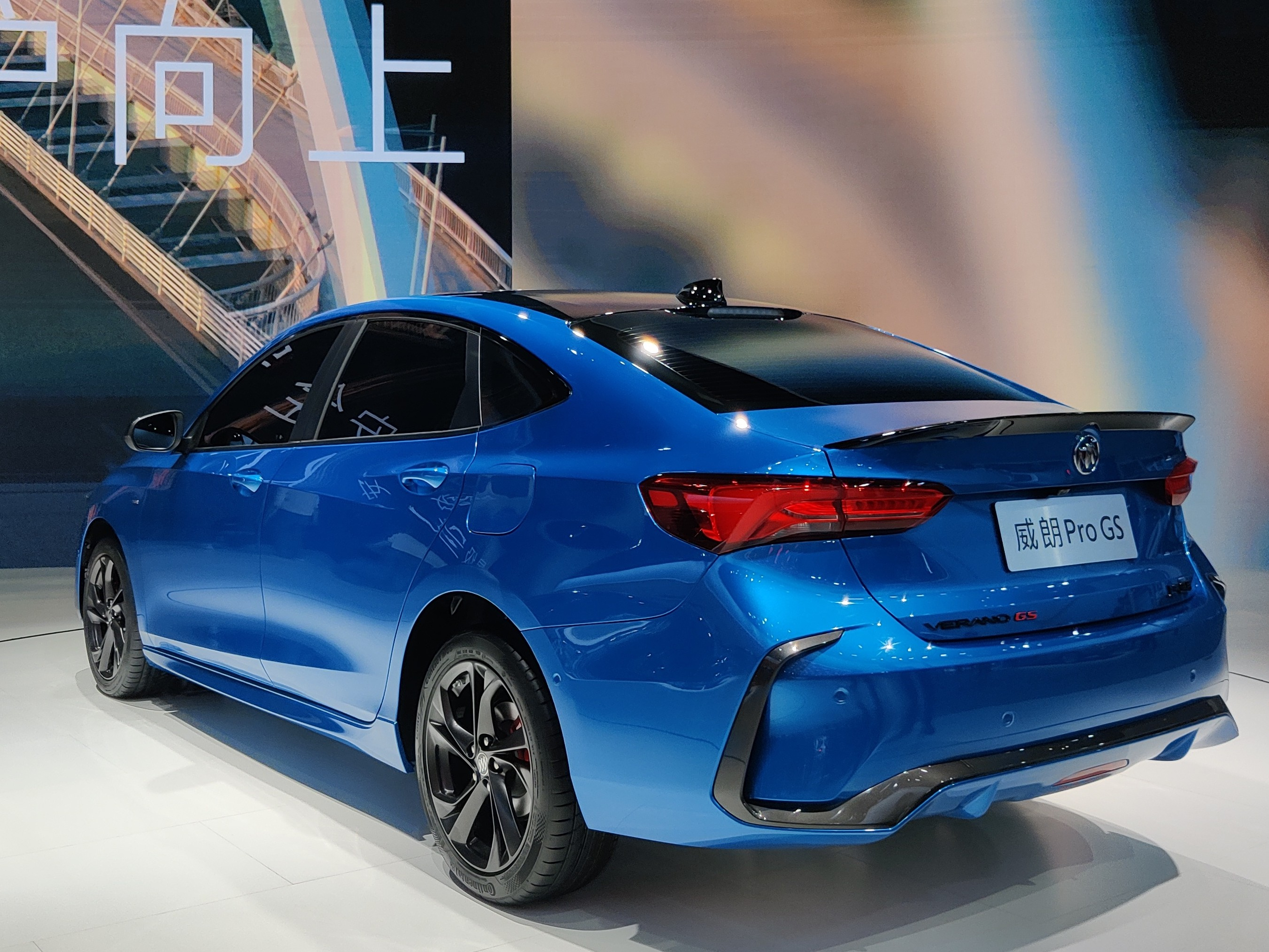
Rear view

== Sales ==
Year	China
2023	106,437
2024	62,675
2025	19,601
