= Avista (disambiguation) =

Avista Corporation is an American energy company.

Avista may also refer to:

- Avista Capital Partners, an American private equity firm
- Avista NAIA World Series, a double-elimination baseball tournament
- Avista Stadium, a baseball park in Spokane Valley, Washington
- Buick Avista, a 2016 concept car
