= General Motors Omega platform =

GM Omega platform

Overview
- Manufacturer: General Motors
- Production: 2016–2023
- Assembly: United States: Detroit, Michigan (Detroit/Hamtramck Assembly)

Body and chassis
- Class: Full-size luxury car (F)
- Layout: Front-engine, rear-wheel drive; Front-engine, four-wheel drive
- Body style: 4-door sedan
- Vehicles: Cadillac CT6
- Related: GM Alpha platform

Powertrain
- Engines: 2.0 L Ecotec I4 (turbocharged gasoline); 3.0 L High Feature LGW V6 (turbocharged gasoline); 3.6 L High Feature LGX V6 (gasoline)
- Transmissions: 8-speed Hydra-Matic 8L45 automatic; 8-speed Hydra-Matic 8L90 automatic

Dimensions
- Wheelbase: 3,106 mm (122.3 in)

Chronology
- Predecessor: GM Zeta Platform (Fullsize); GM G platform
- Successor: GM VSS-R

The GM Omega platform is a vehicle architecture designed by General Motors for full-size, rear-wheel and all-wheel drive luxury vehicles. The platform architecture was developed for Cadillac, and subsequently debuted in the 2016 Cadillac CT6 sedan.

== Vehicle applications ==
=== Production vehicle applications ===
- 2016–2023 (2020 for US production)
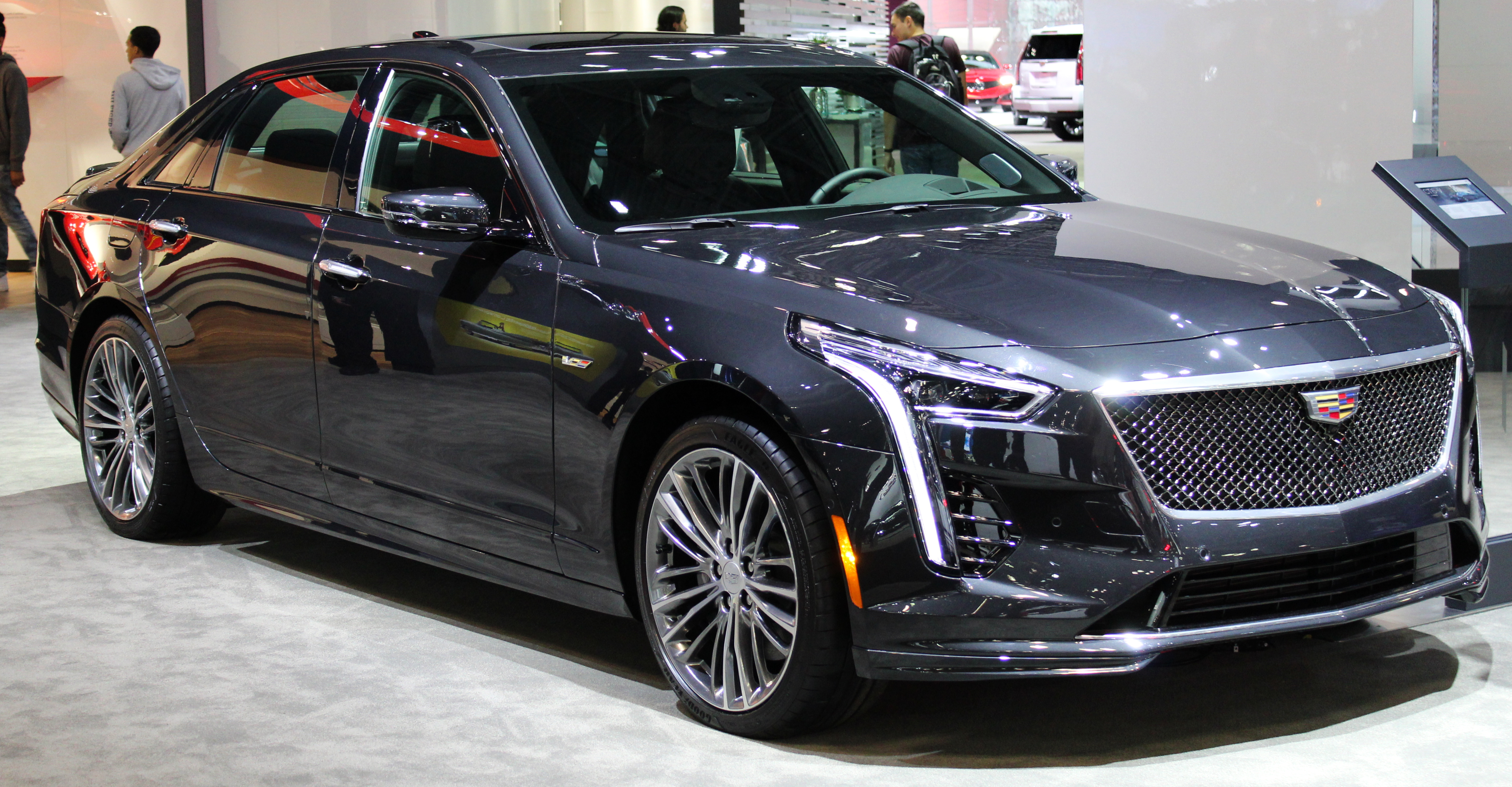
Cadillac CT6

=== Concept vehicle applications ===
- 2015 Buick Avenir Concept
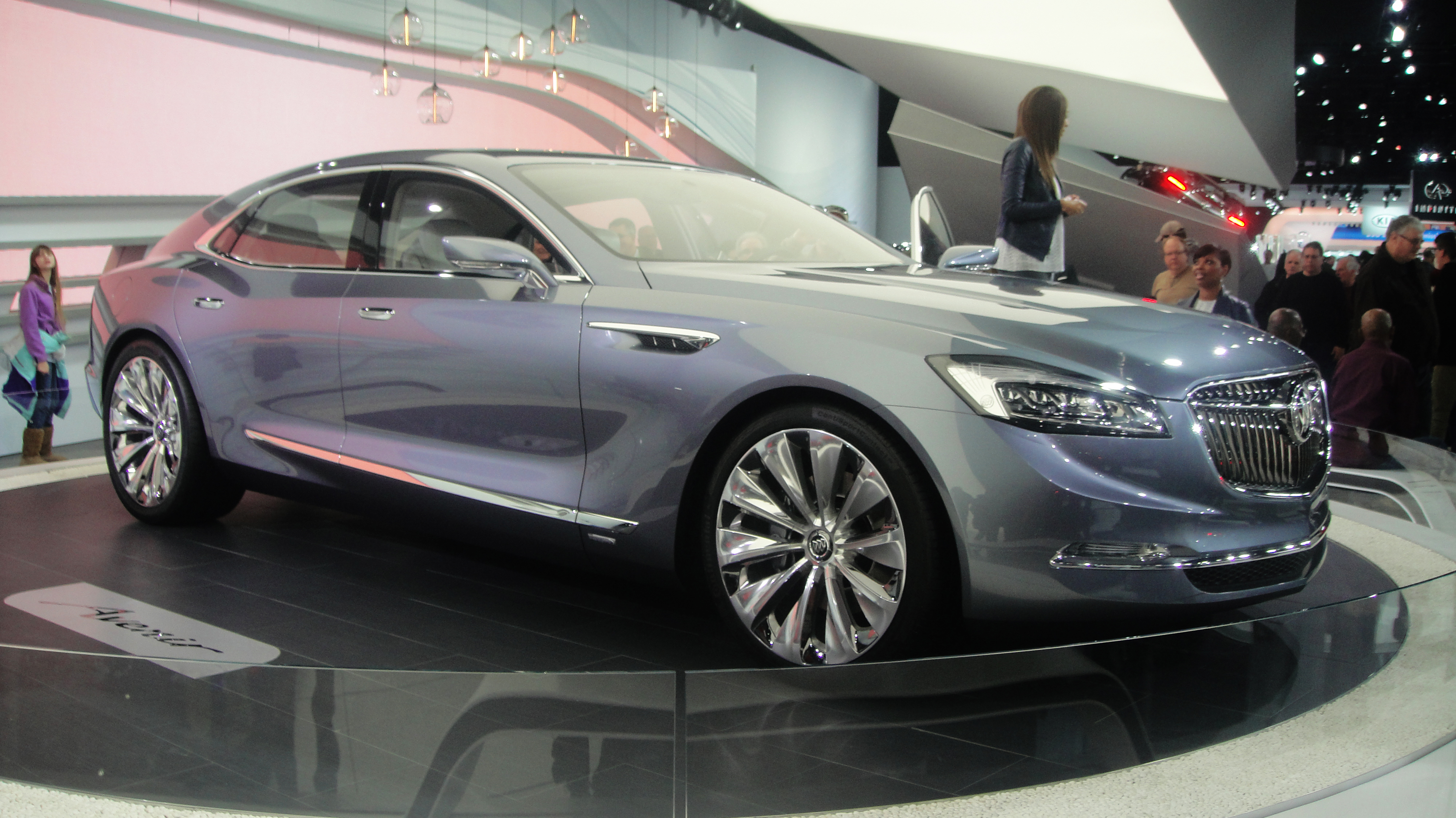
Buick Avenir Concept
