= General Motors VSS platforms =

Series of car platforms

GM VSS platforms
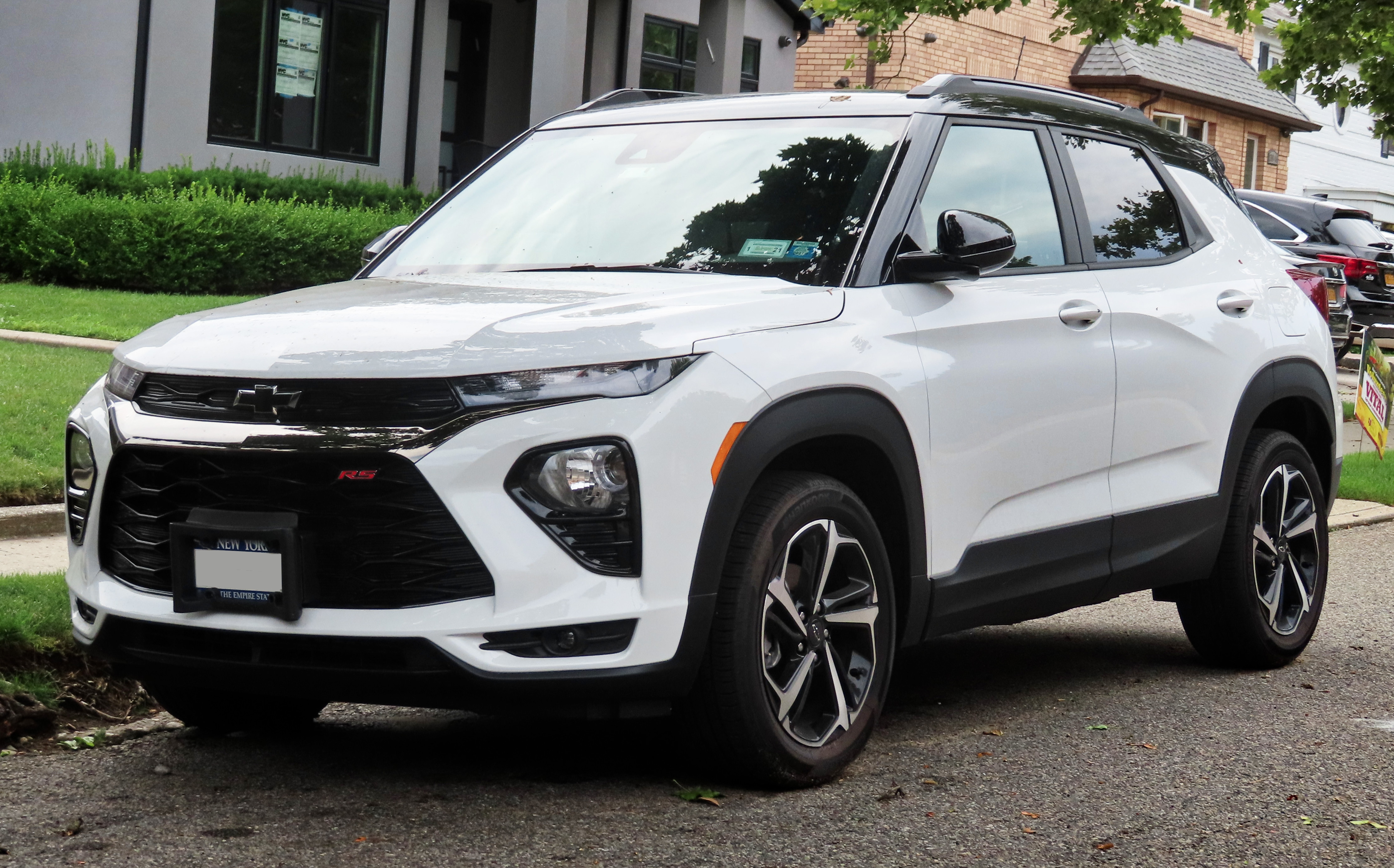
- Chevrolet Trailblazer, one of the first vehicles to use a VSS platform

Overview
- Manufacturer: General Motors
- Also called: VSS-F; VSS-R; VSS-S; VSS-T
- Production: 2019–present

Body and chassis
- Layout: Front-engine, front-wheel-drive: VSS-F, VSS-S; Front-engine, rear-wheel-drive: VSS-R, VSS-T; Front-engine, four-wheel-drive: all variants

Chronology
- Predecessor: VSS-F: Delta, Epsilon, Gamma; VSS-R: Alpha, Omega; VSS-S: Theta; VSS-T: GMT

Vehicle Set Strategy (VSS) is a series of four automotive platforms developed by American manufacturer General Motors for their vehicles as part of an effort to consolidate their platform usage for the present and future. GM eventually plans to have the VSS platforms underpin over 75% of their models, the exceptions being the BEV3 platform used for electric vehicles and specialty vehicles like the Corvette.

== VSS-F ==
VSS-F is GM's primary front-wheel drive (F) platform as of 2024, considered a successor to the Gamma, Delta, and Epsilon platforms. It is planned to underpin many subcompact to fullsize cars as well as GM's smaller crossovers, a pattern established by the first models to use it, the Chevrolet Trailblazer and Buick Encore GX. The platform can also be used for all-wheel drive vehicles.

Of the four, this platform has the most developed implementation plan, with three variants already established: which are VSS-F A for minicompact cars (i.e. Chevrolet Spark), VSS-F B/C for subcompact and compact cars and crossovers (e.g. Buick Encore and Chevrolet Sonic), and VSS-F D/E for midsize and fullsize cars (i.e. Chevrolet Malibu and Impala).

=== Applications ===
- Buick Encore GX (9BUB) (2019–present)
- Buick Verano Pro (JCSB) (2021–present)
- Buick Century (SGM458) (2022–present)
- Buick Envista (9BQB) (2022–present)
- Buick LaCrosse (E2LB-2) (2023–present)
- Chevrolet Trailblazer (9BYC) (2020–present)
- Chevrolet Trax/Seeker (9BQC) (2023–present)
- Chevrolet Montana (2023–present)
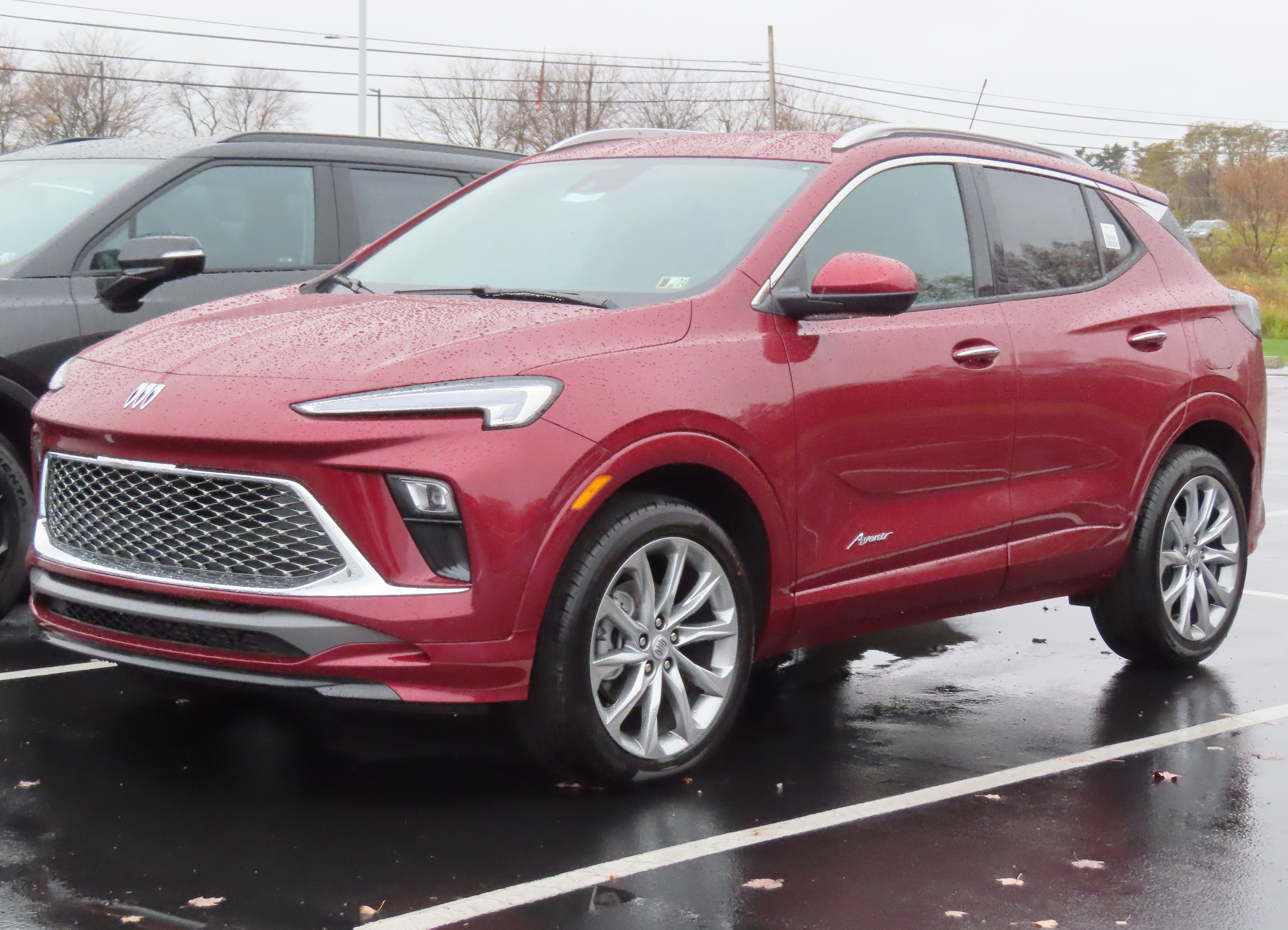
Buick Encore GX

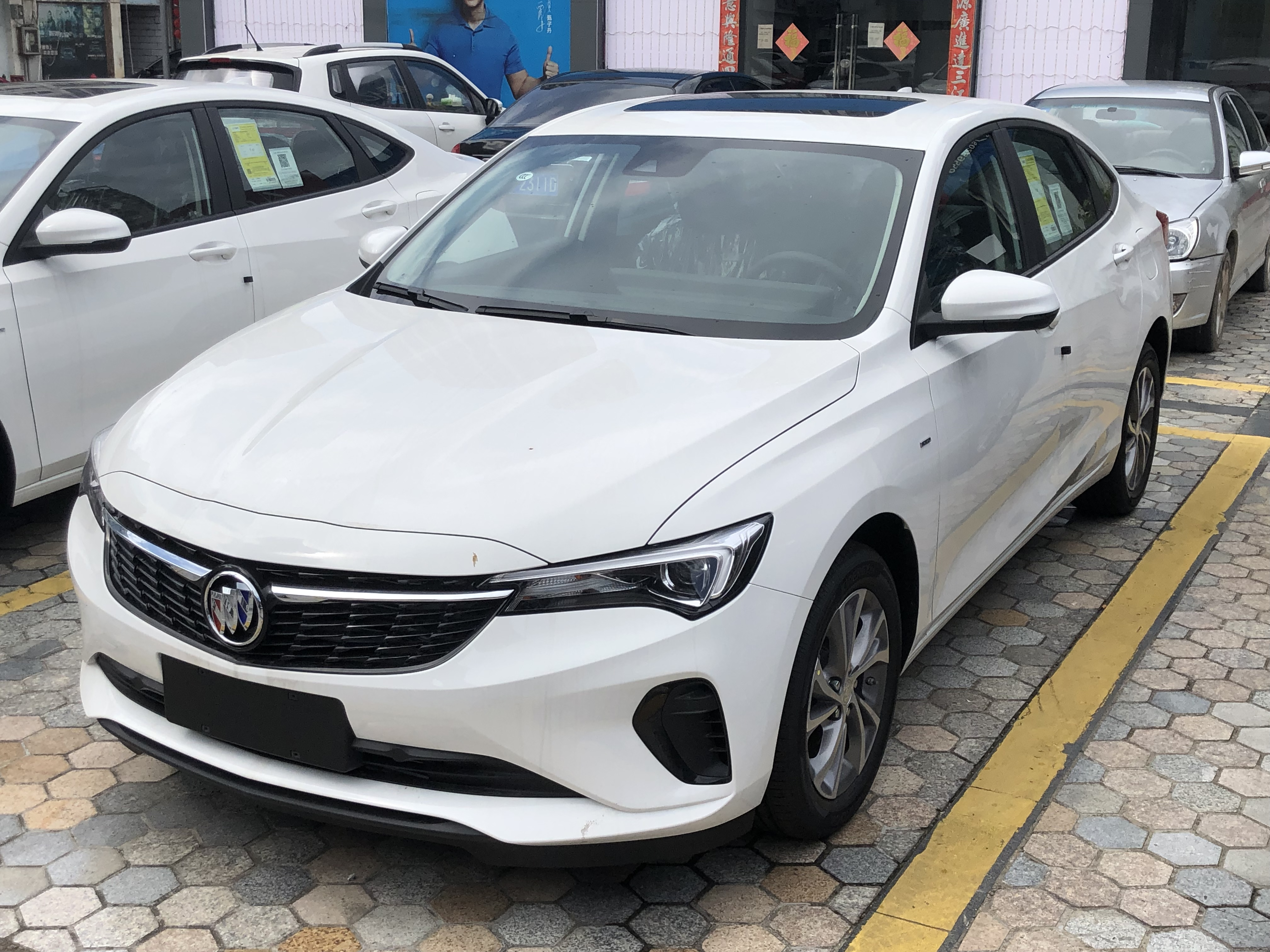
Buick Verano Pro

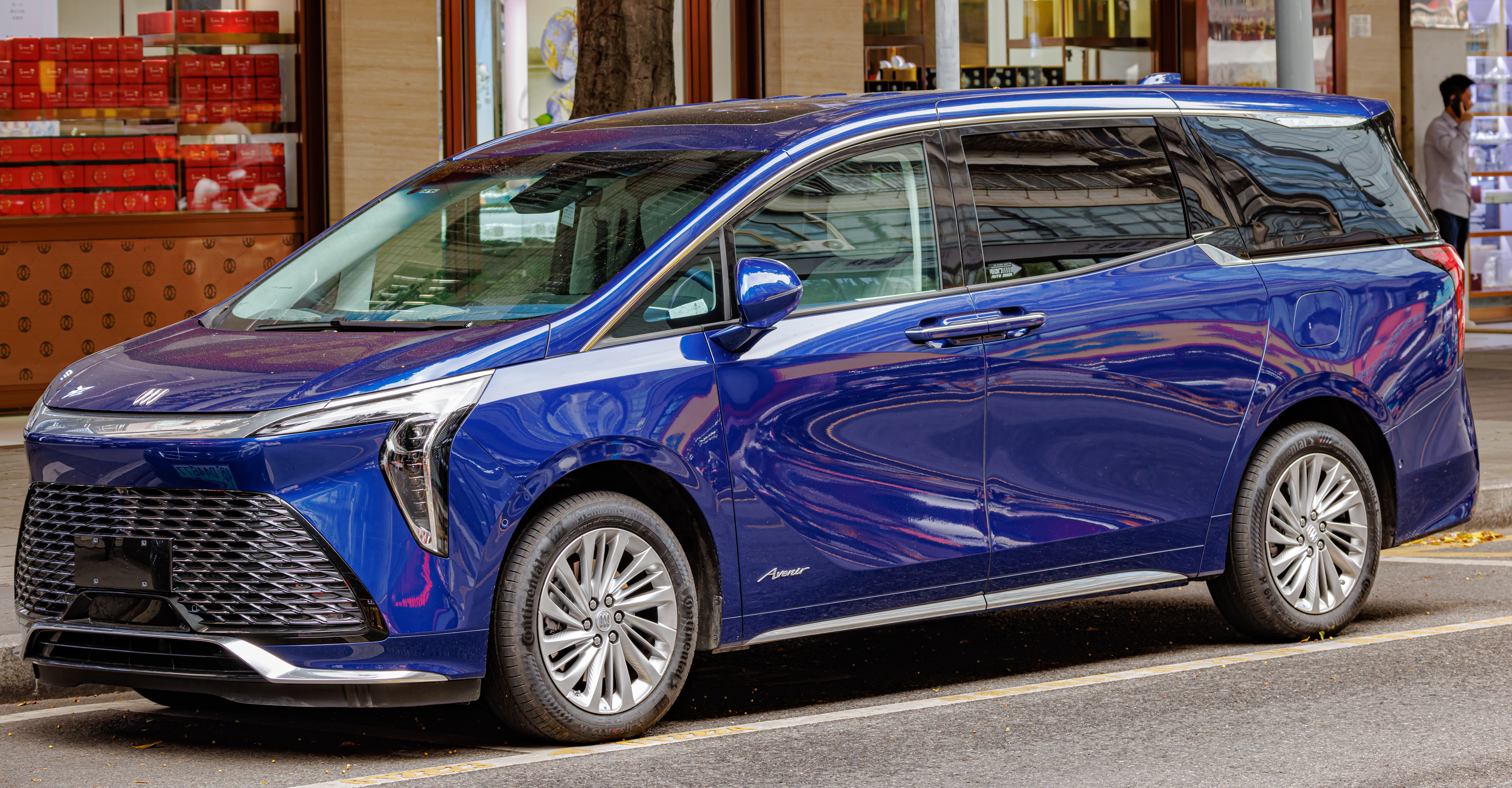
Buick Century

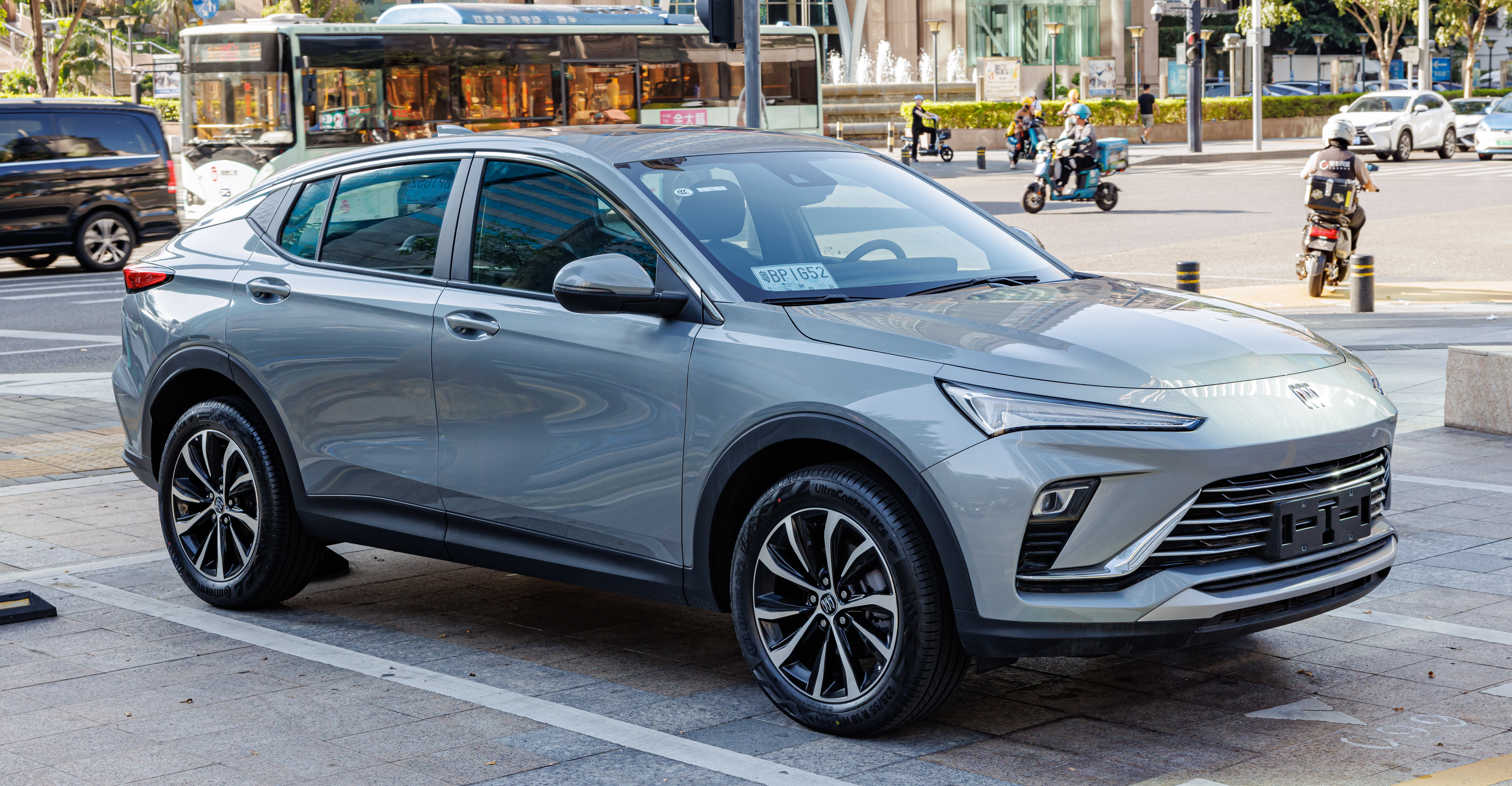
Buick Envista

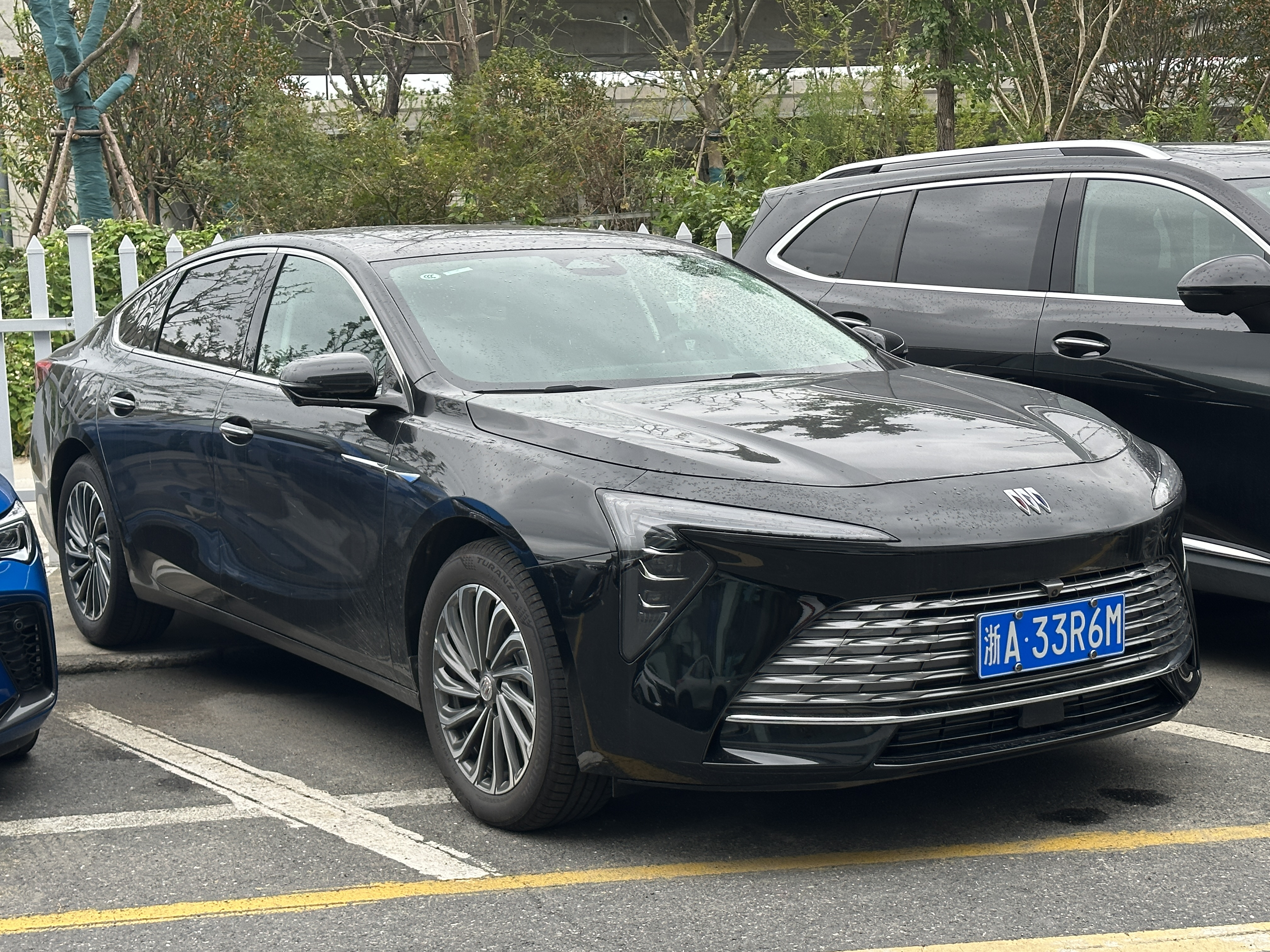
Buick LaCrosse

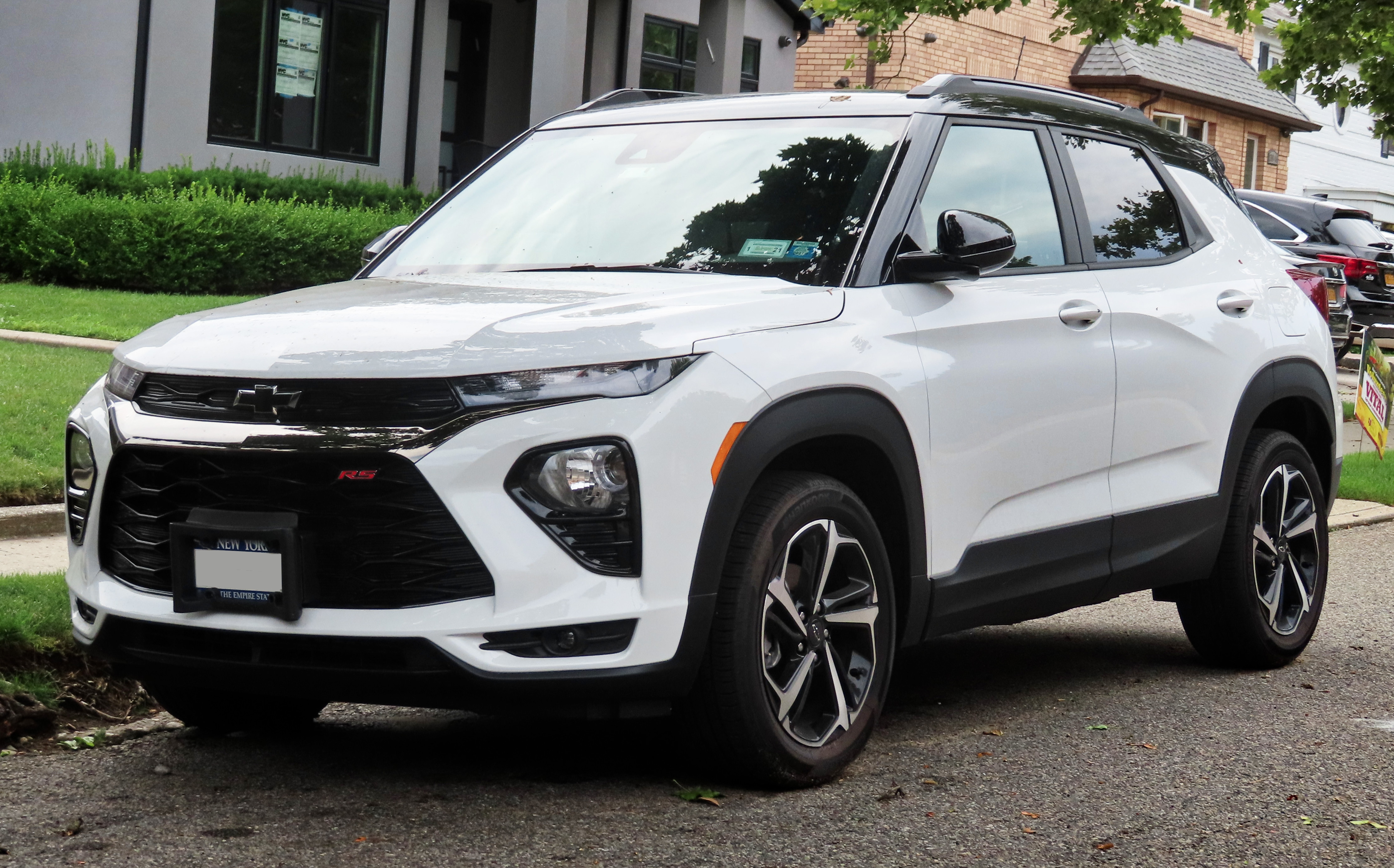
Chevrolet Trailblazer

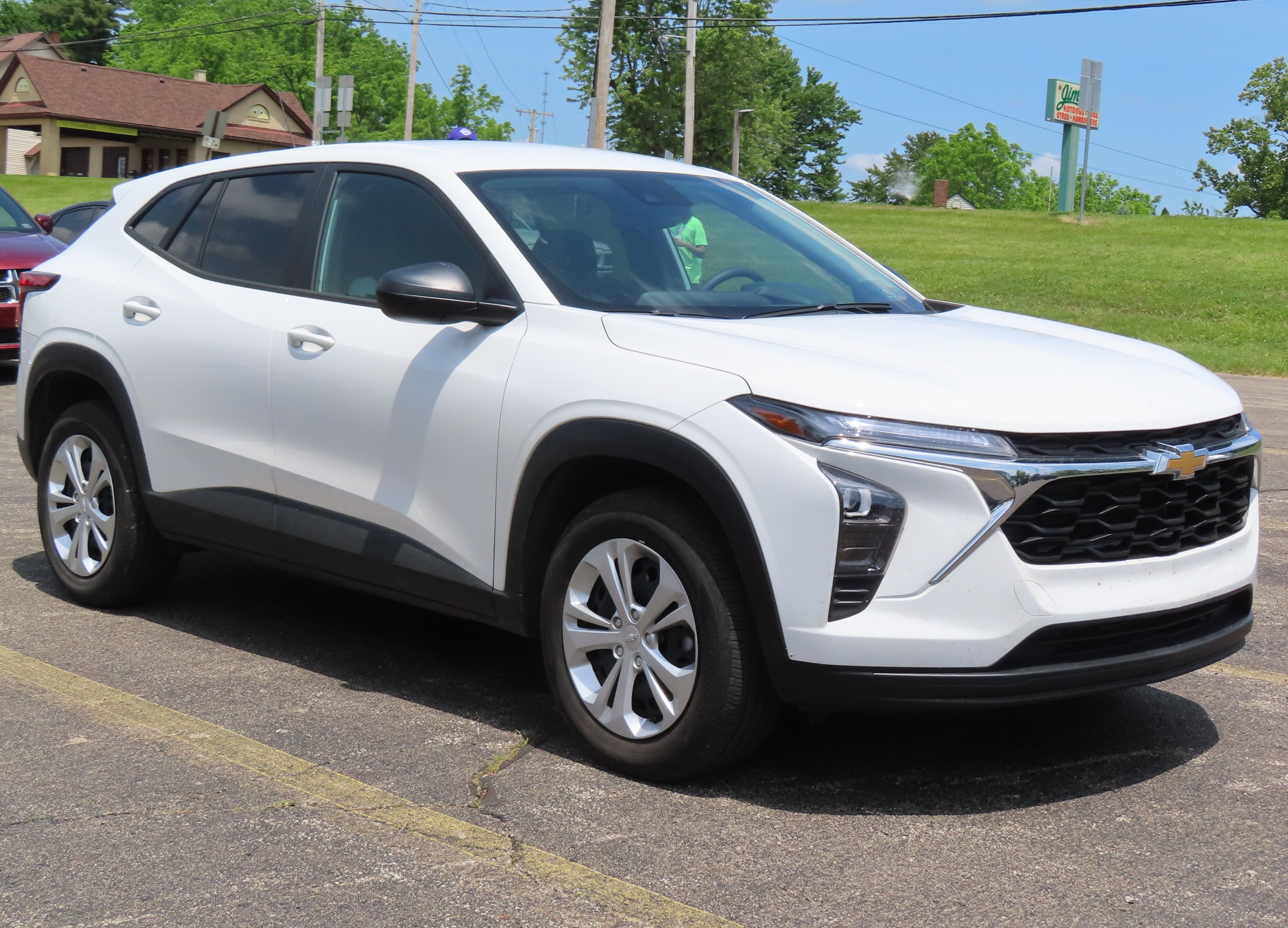
Chevrolet Trax

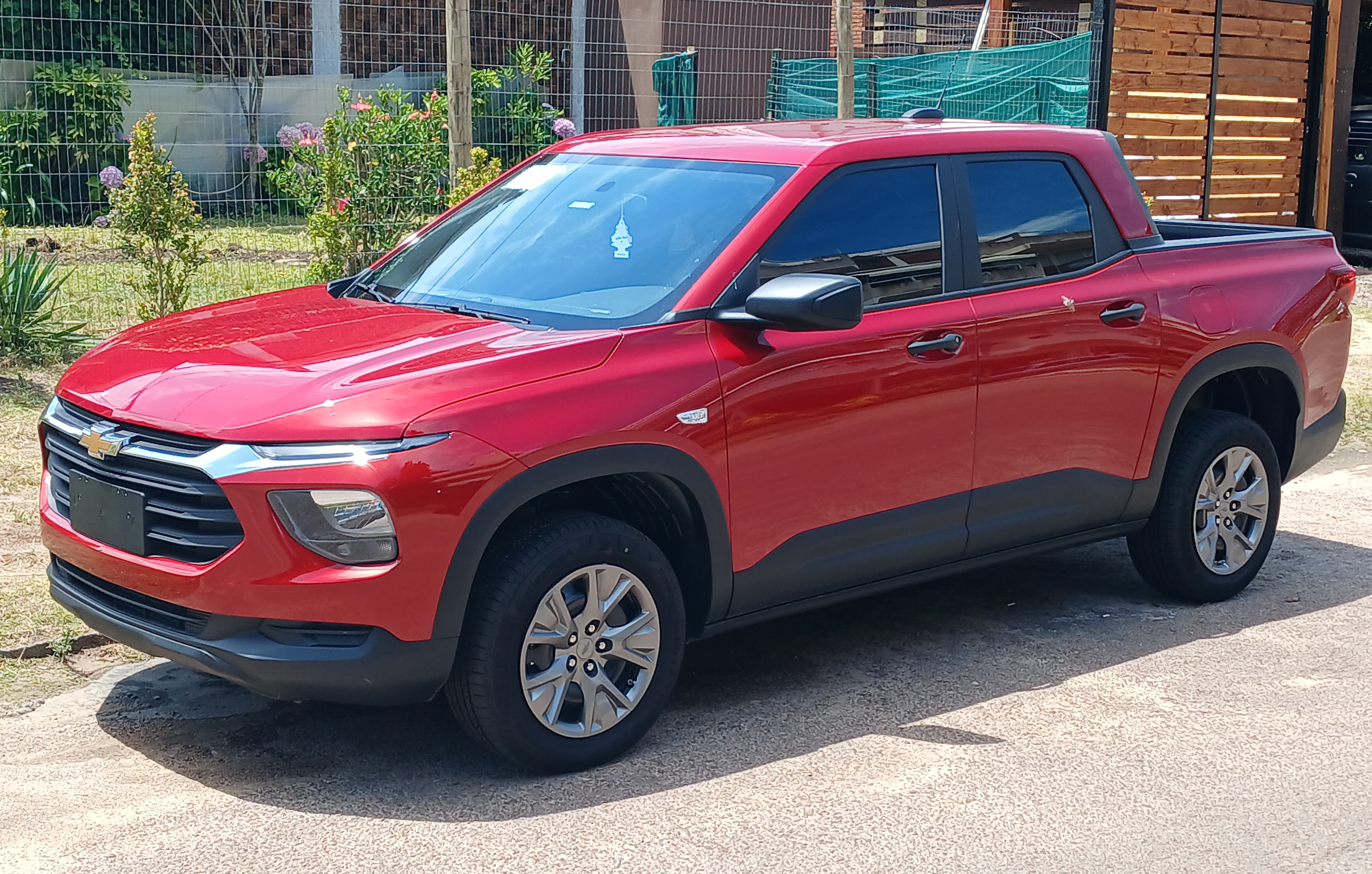
Chevrolet Montana

== VSS-R ==
VSS-R GM's rear-wheel drive (R) platform succeeding both the Alpha and Omega platforms. Vehicles slated to be underpinned by this platform include the second generations of the Cadillac CT4, CT5, and CT6, as well as future models of the Chevrolet Camaro.

=== Applications ===
- Cadillac CT6 (O1SL-2) (2023–present)
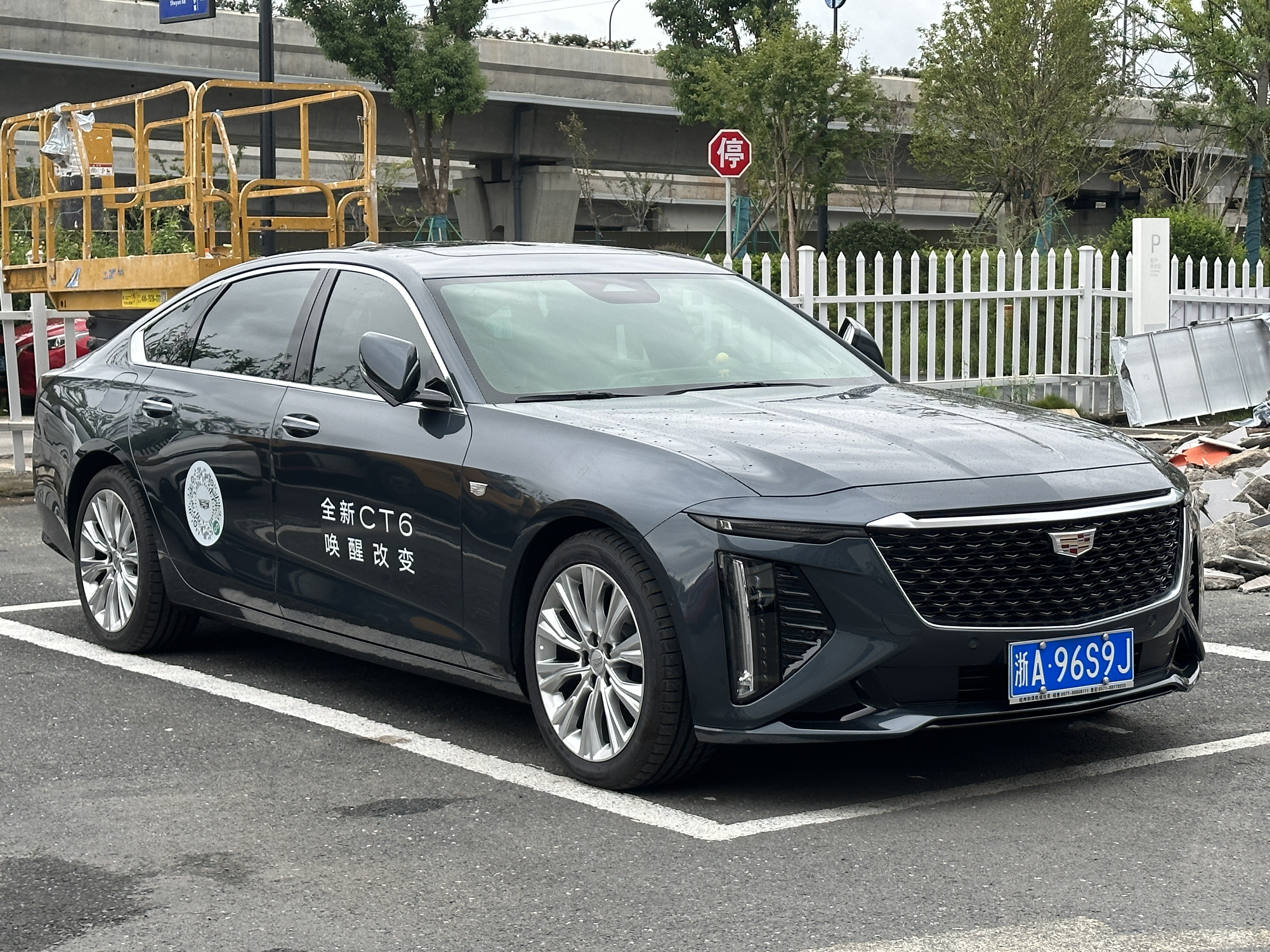
Cadillac CT6

== VSS-S ==
VSS-S GM's SUV (S) platform, capable of both front and all-wheel drive. GM utilizes this platform for vehicles ranging in size between compact and full-size. Vehicles underpinned by this platform include the Buick Enclave and Chevrolet Equinox.

=== Applications ===
- Buick Enclave (2024–present)
- Chevrolet Equinox (2024–present)
- Chevrolet Traverse (2024–present)
- Cadillac XT5 (2024–present)
- GMC Acadia (2024–present)
- GMC Terrain (2024–present)
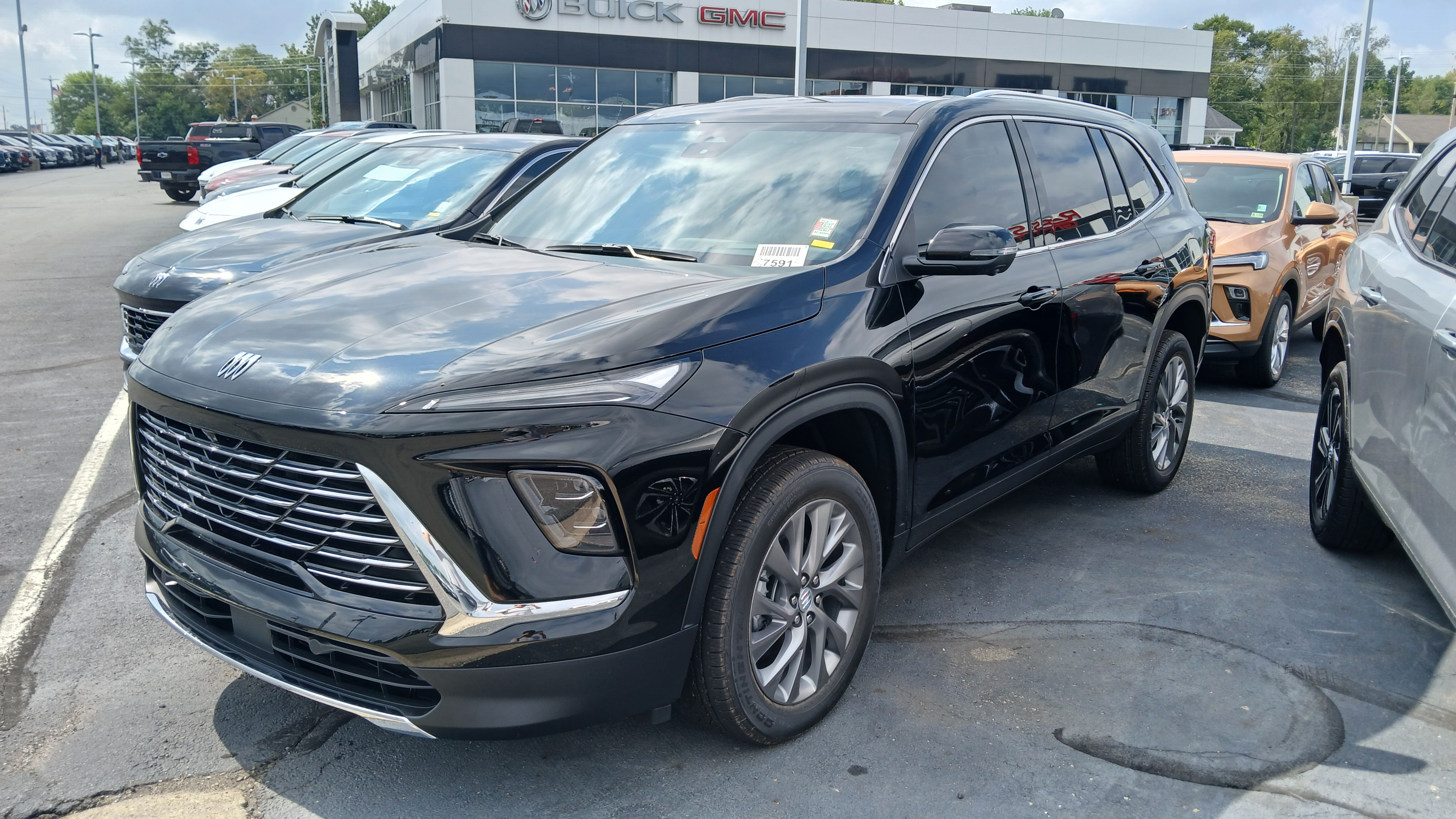
Buick Enclave

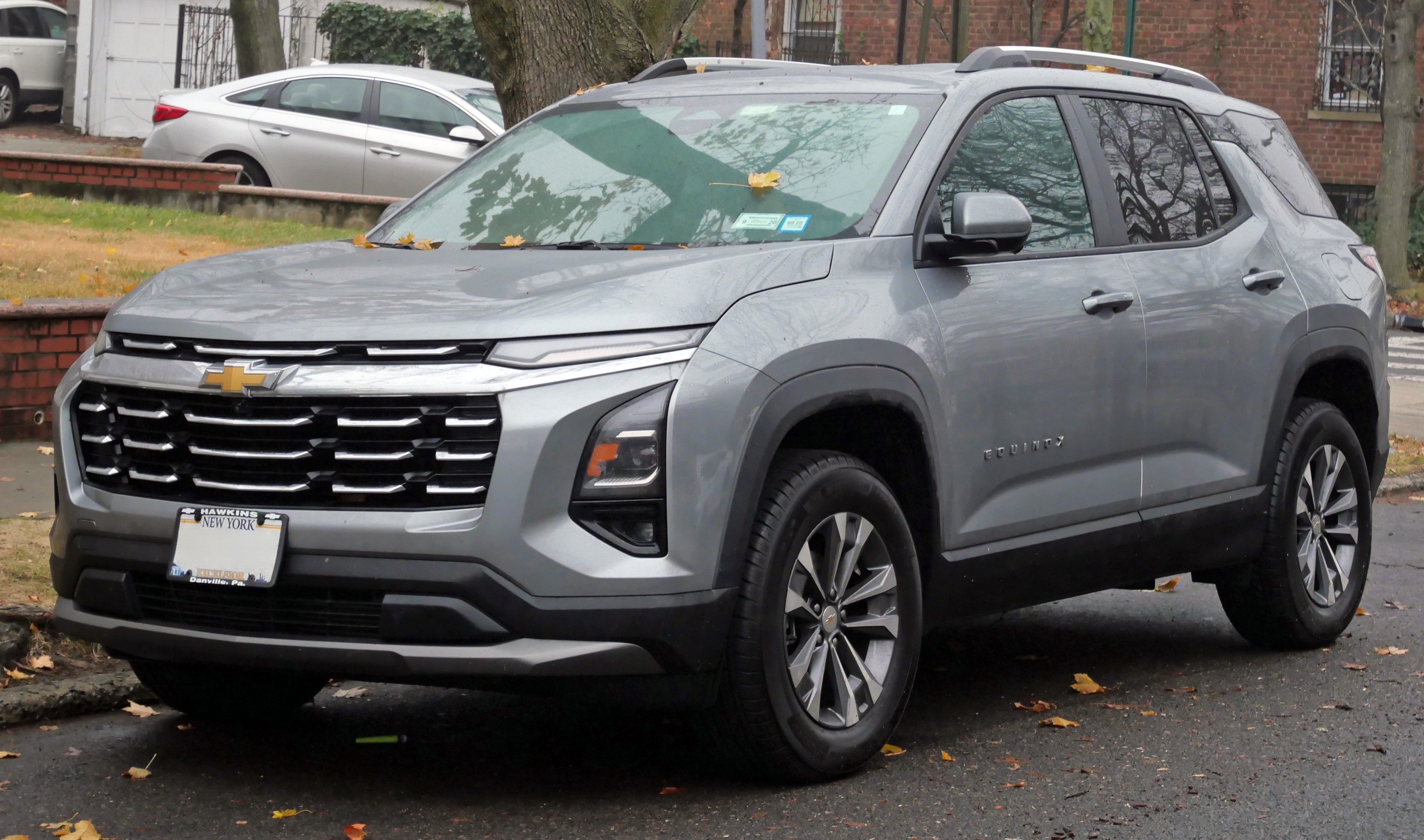
Chevrolet Equinox

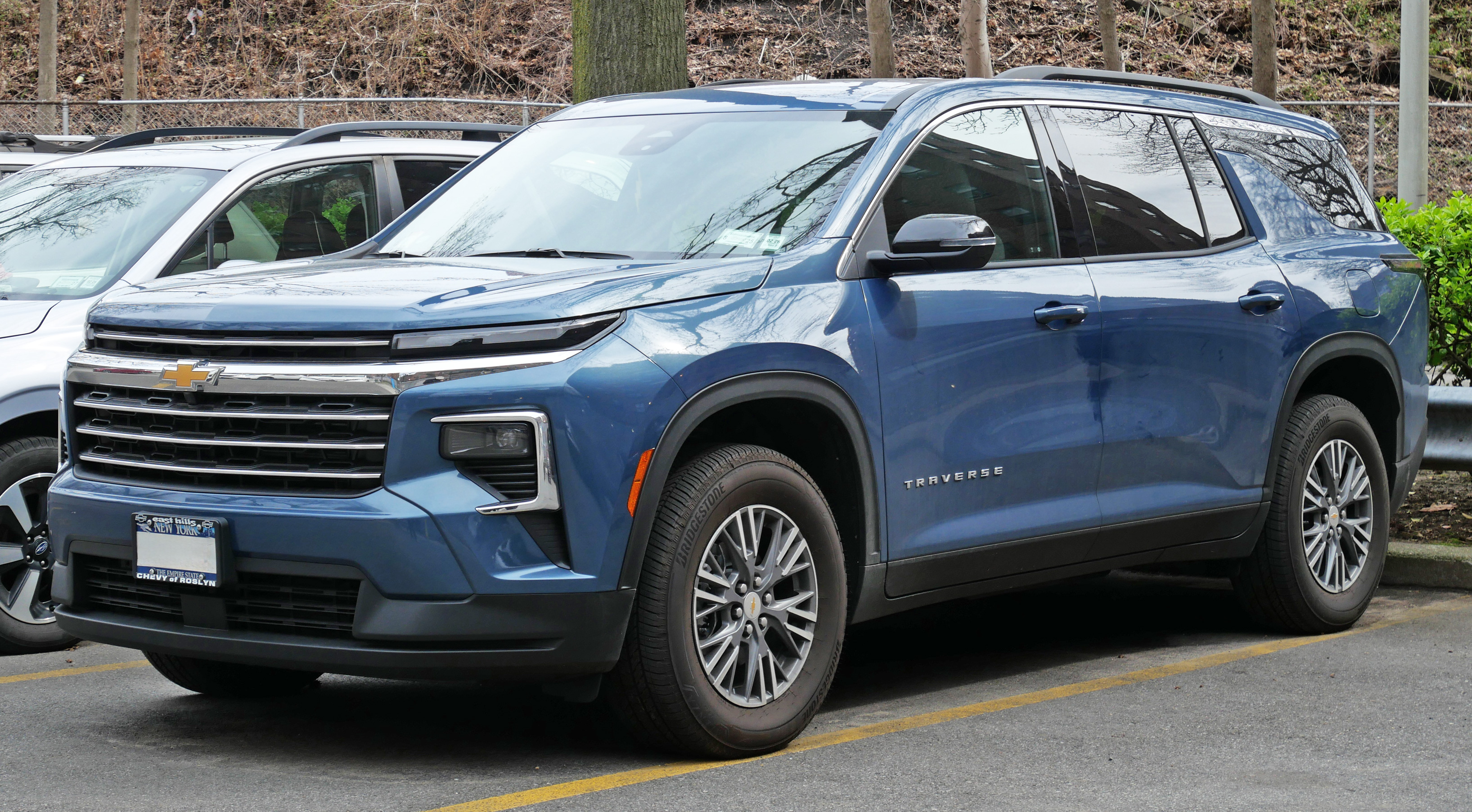
Chevrolet Traverse

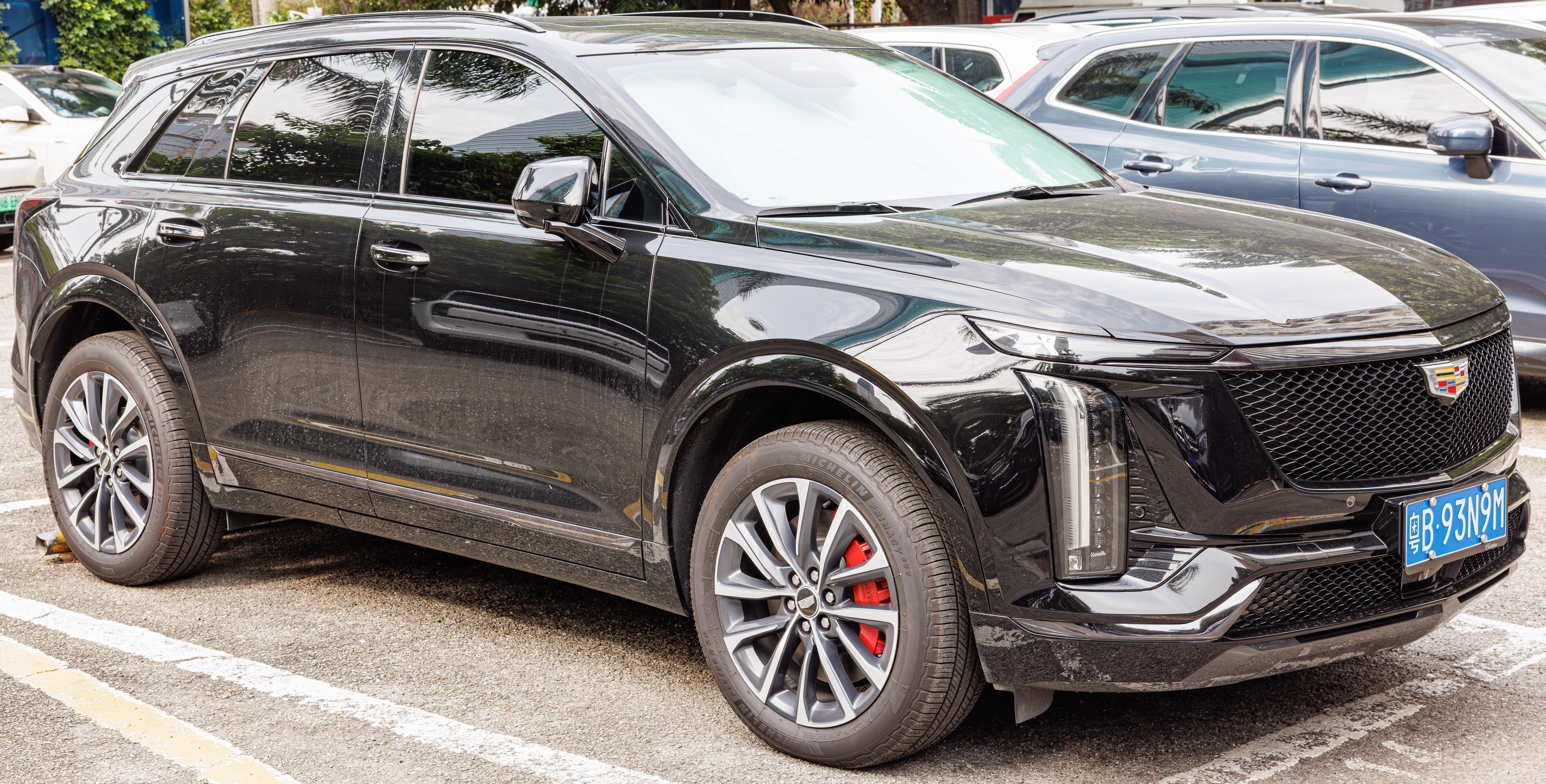
Cadillac XT5

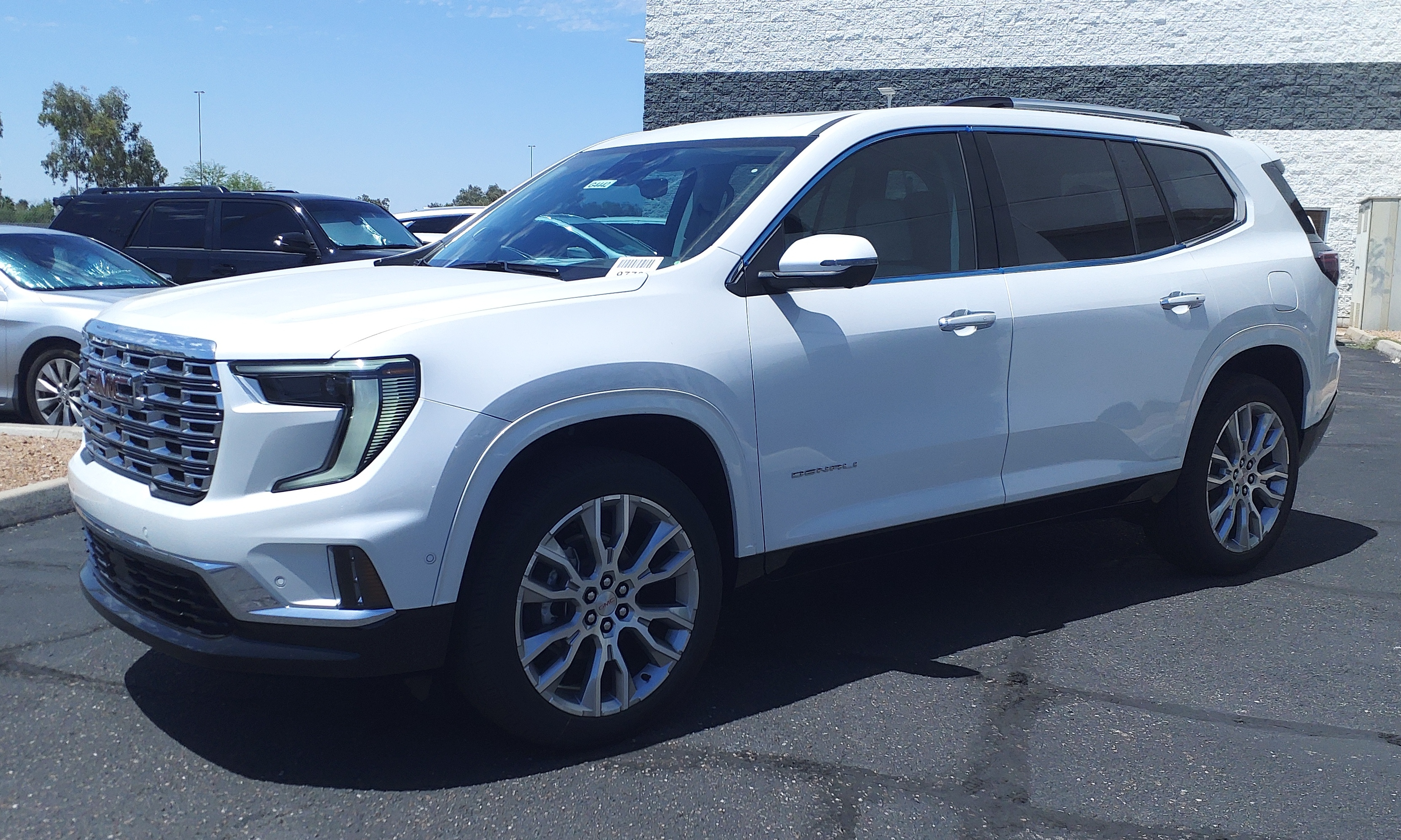
GMC Acadia

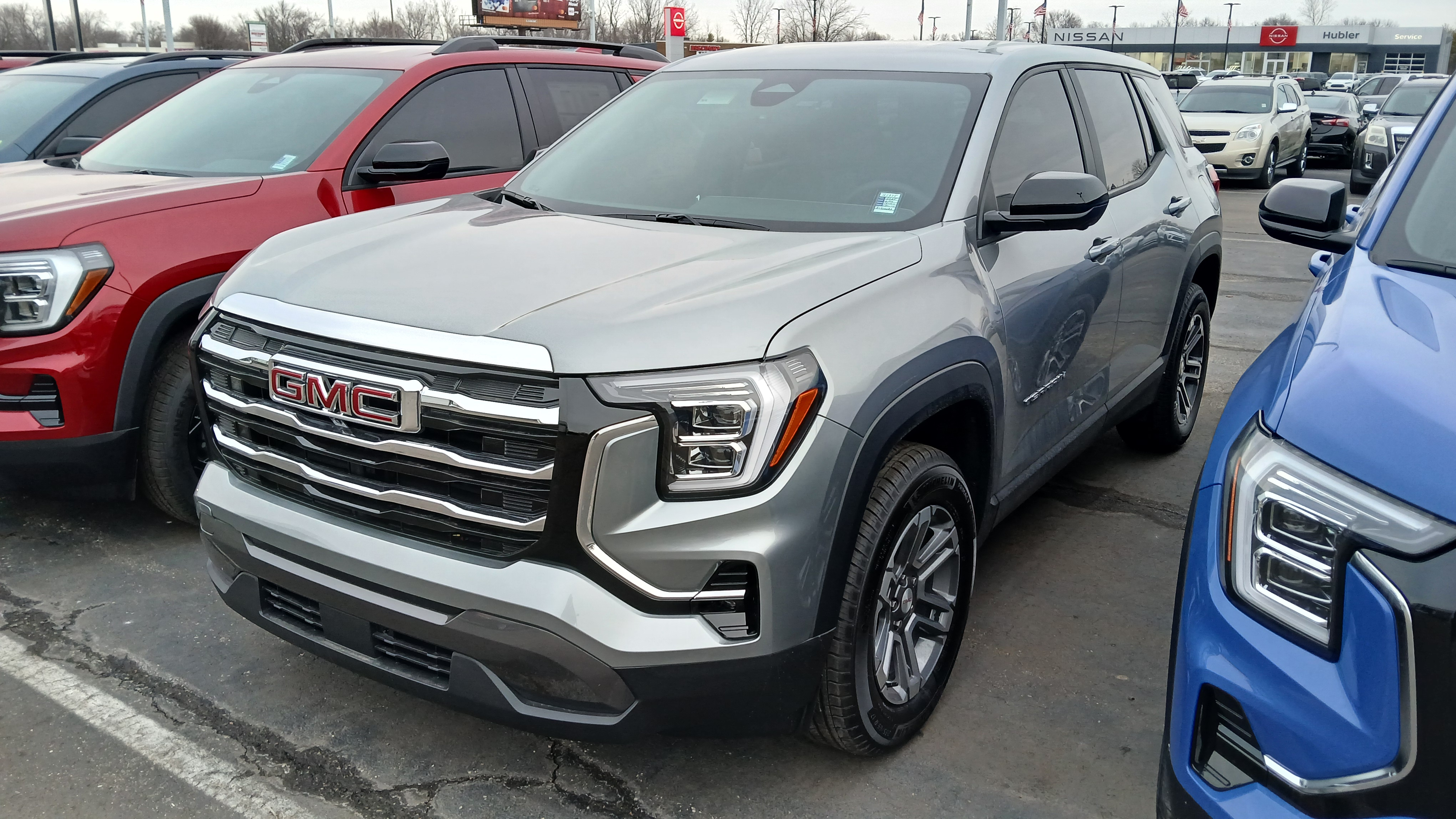
GMC Terrain

== VSS-T ==
VSS-T is GM's body-on-frame SUV and pickup truck (T) platform succeeding the long-standing GMT platform and capable of all-wheel drive. It is to be capable of supporting mid-size and full-size truck dimensions and underpins both the fifth generation Chevrolet Silverado/GMC Sierra and the third generation Chevrolet Colorado/GMC Canyon.

=== Applications ===
- Chevrolet Colorado/GMC Canyon (2023–present)
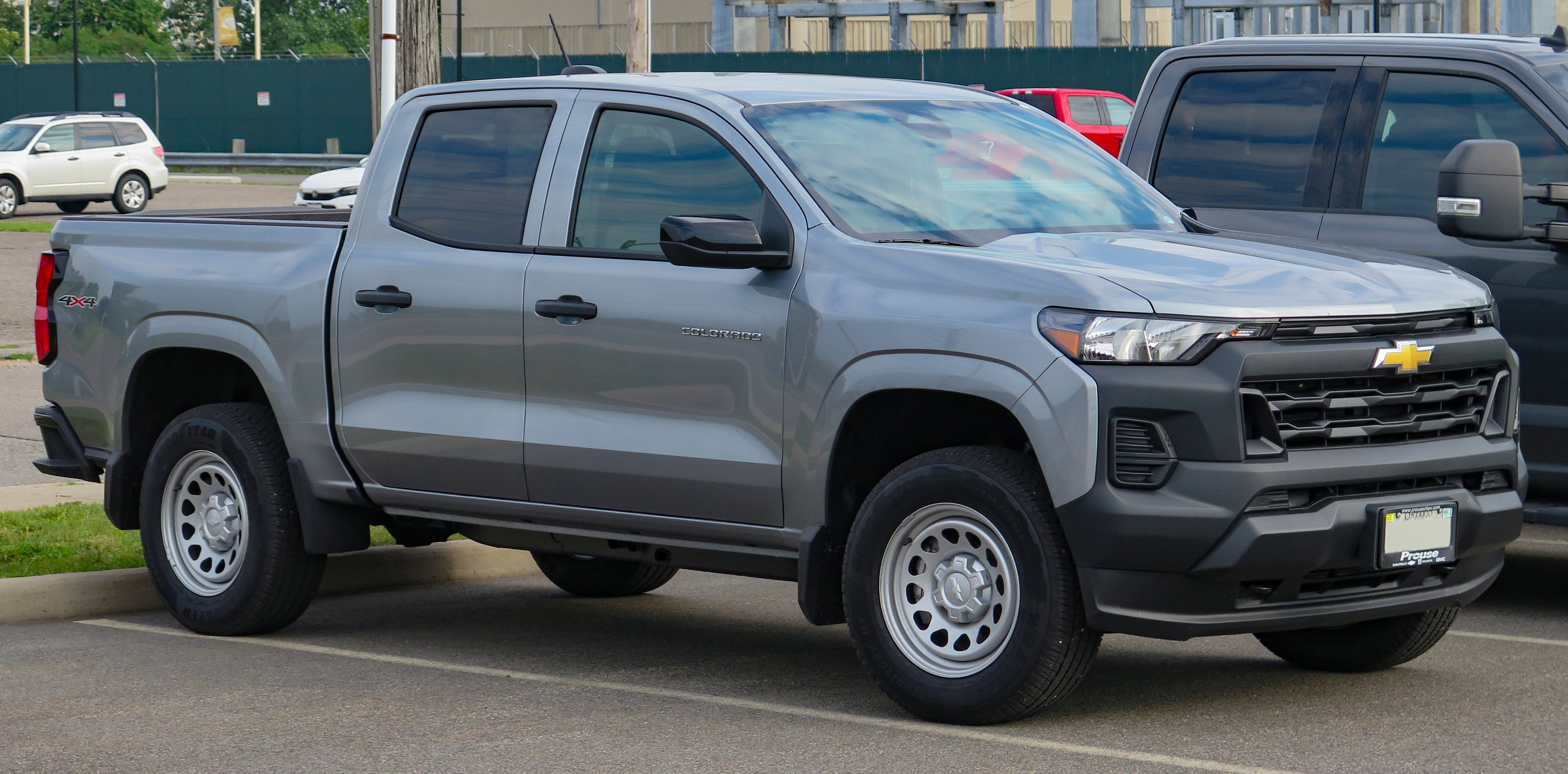
Chevrolet Colorado

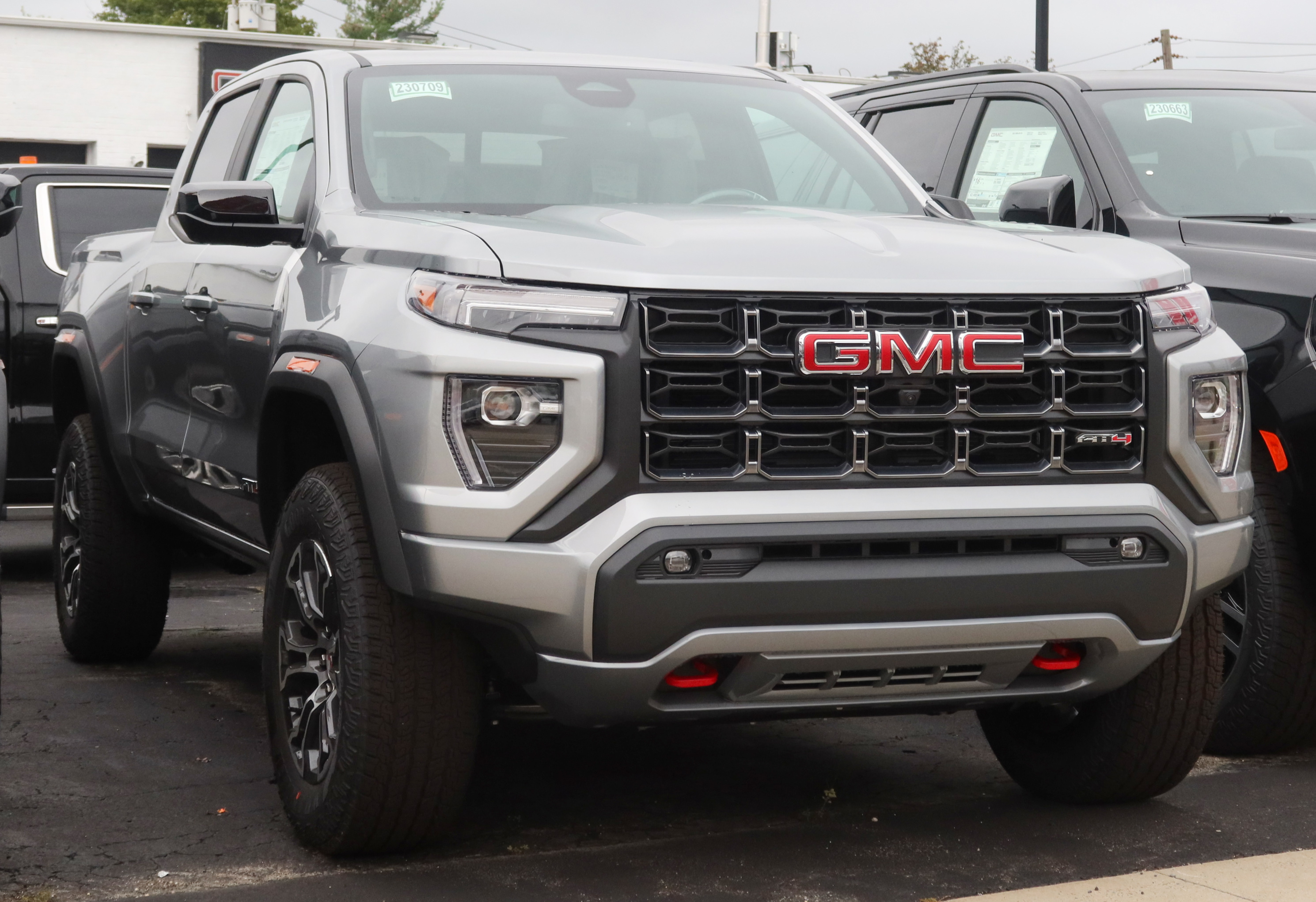
GMC Canyon

== See also ==
- List of General Motors platforms
