= Buick Avista =

Concept car developed by Buick

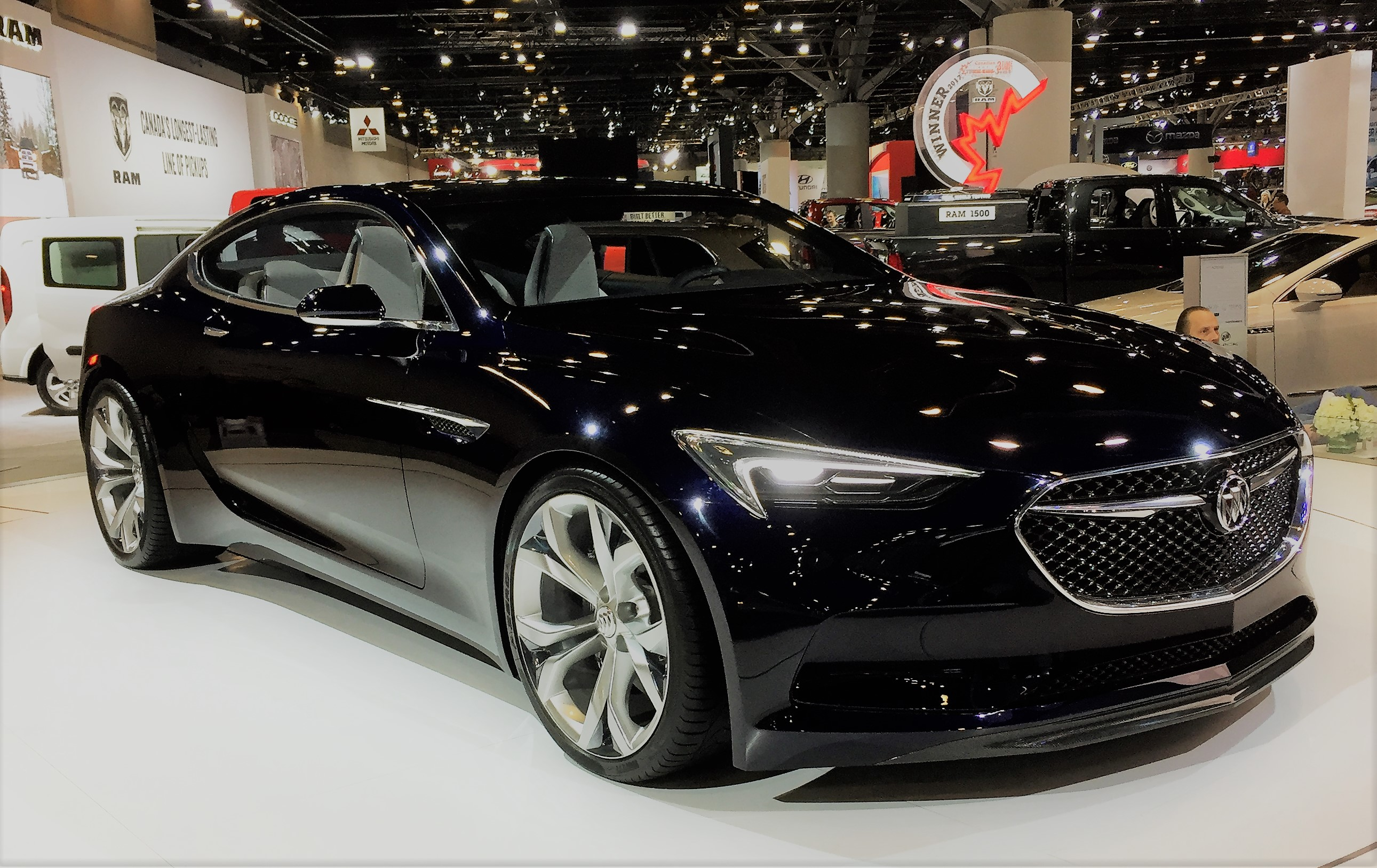

Overview
- Manufacturer: Buick (General Motors)
- Production: 2016 (concept car)
- Designer: John McDougall, Aaron Stich (interior); Jesung Ahn (exterior)

Body and chassis
- Class: Grand Tourer (S); Muscle Car (D); Pony car (D); Compact executive car sports car (D)
- Body style: 2-door, 2+2-seater hardtop coupe
- Layout: Front-engine, rear-wheel-drive
- Platform: GM Alpha platform

Powertrain
- Engine: 3.0 L twin-turbo V6 (400 hp)
- Transmission: 8-speed automatic

Dimensions
- Wheelbase: 2,811 mm (110.7 in)

Chronology
- Predecessor: Buick Riviera

The Buick Avista is a concept 2-door, 2+2-seater hardtop coupe built by Buick, first unveiled at the 2016 North American International Auto Show on January 10, 2016.

The exterior, finished in superior blue, boasts a low-slung flowing pillarless coupe design with a sloping fastback roofline. The front fascia is said to have been inspired by the 1954 Buick Wildcat II concept car. On the inside, the seats are upholstered in mist gray leather, complete with carbon fiber aluminium accents to give the driver's compartment a more sporty appearance. The dashboard features a wide touchscreen previewing a "future version" of Buick's IntelliLink infotainment system. The doors and interior components were 3D-printed.

The Avista concept car is related to the Cadillac ATS-V Coupe and sixth generation Chevrolet Camaro by sharing the same rear-wheel-drive Alpha platform. Its chassis utilizes Magnetic Ride Control to provide more precise handling. Power comes from a 3.0-liter twin-turbocharged V6 engine producing 400 hp, backed by an 8-speed automatic transmission. Its engine comes equipped with cylinder deactivation to improve fuel efficiency.

The concept car was met with critical acclaim, winning the 2016 EyesOn Design award (also won by the Buick Avenir in the previous year), as well as being named "Best Future Concept" by The Detroit News. The fastback coupe concept was applauded for its perfectly proportioned rear-drive stance.

The Avista nameplate, meaning sight in Italian, was previously filed for trademark registration by General Motors on September 22, 2015.

== Production consideration ==
Although the car was merely intended as a design study, GM considered putting the Avista or a similar car into production as a halo vehicle for Buick, according to a Buick representative. A production version was expected to retain the platform and engine from the concept. Its prospects were boosted by the great fanfare generated by its introduction at the Detroit Auto Show.

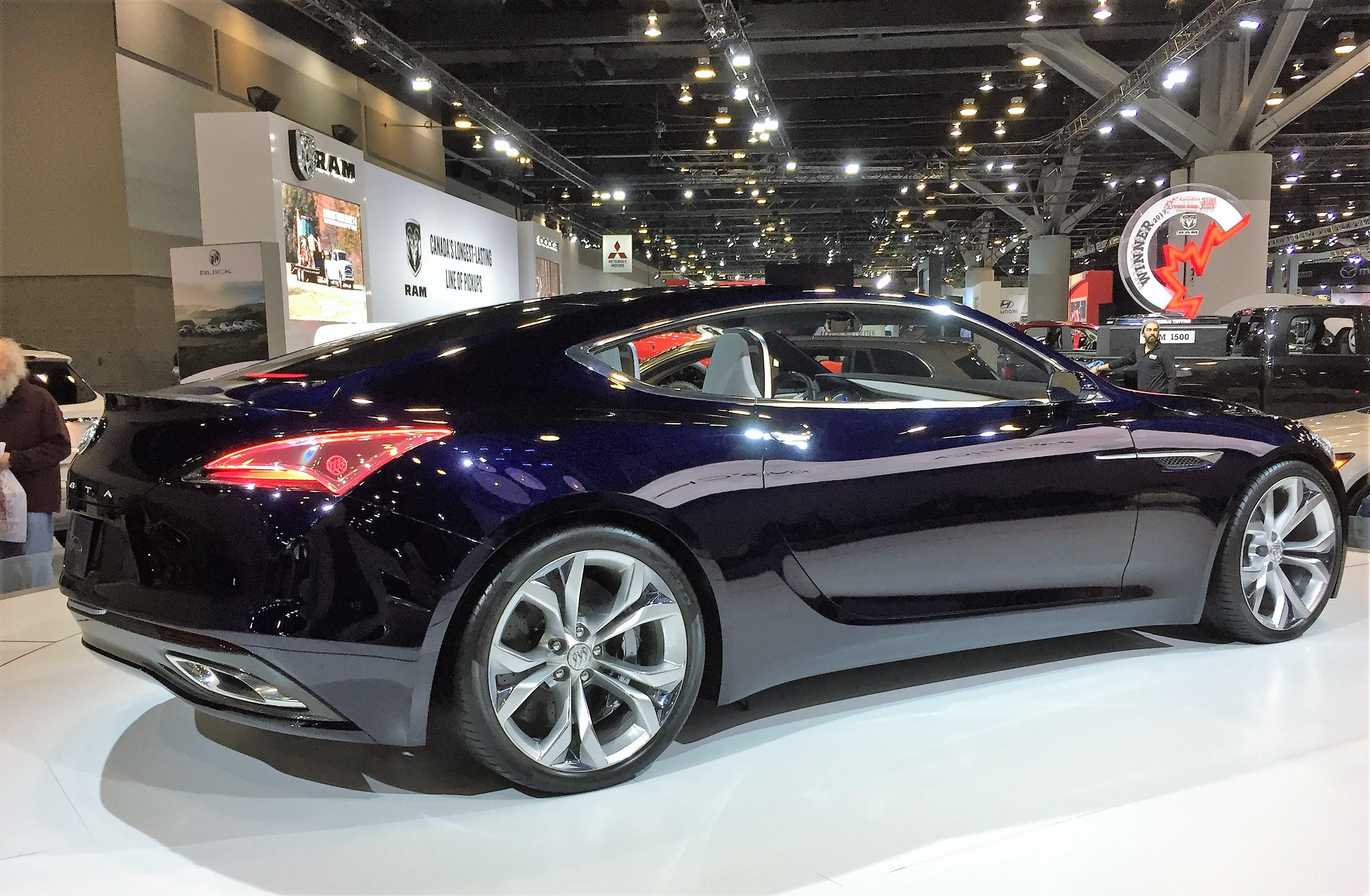
Rear view

However, Buick ultimately decided not to make the Avista. Despite the interest, Buick restated it was a design study and would not be produced. They also decided not to make a sedan version of the Avista to replace the Buick Regal.

== See also ==
- Buick Avenir
