= Buick Avenir =

Concept car developed by Buick

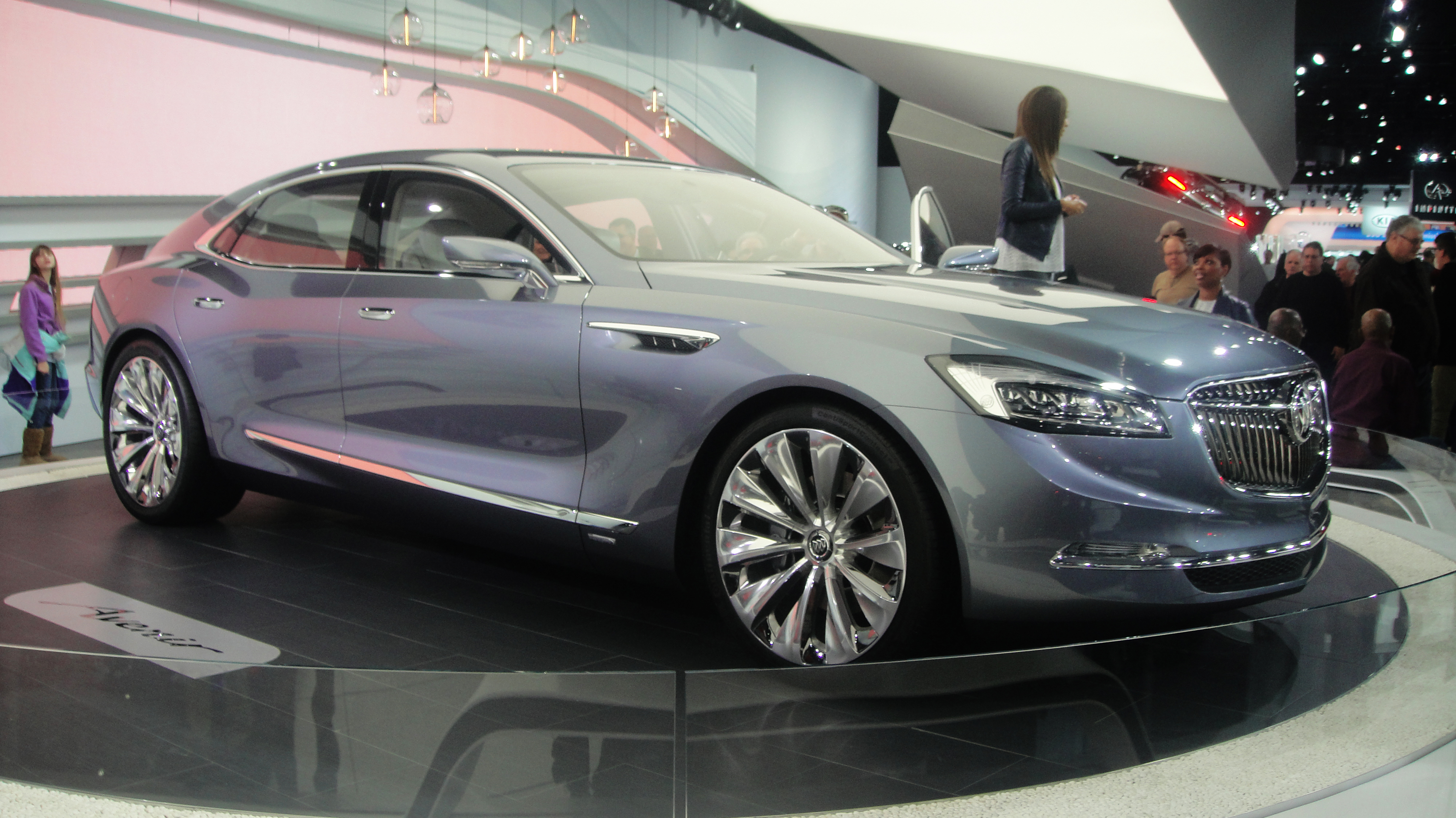

Overview
- Manufacturer: Buick (General Motors)
- Designer: Warrack Leach

Body and chassis
- Class: Concept car
- Body style: 4-door sedan
- Layout: Front-engine, all-wheel drive
- Platform: GM Omega platform

Powertrain
- Engine: direct-injection V6
- Transmission: 9-speed automatic

Dimensions
- Length: 5,195 mm (204.5 in)
- Width: 1,931 mm (76.0 in)

The Buick Avenir is a concept car manufactured by Buick. The name of the vehicle Avenir means 'future' in French. In October 2017, Buick made Avenir a premium top-of-the-line sub-brand, similar to GMC’s Denali and Chevrolet’s Signature series. The Buick LaCrosse and Enclave were the first vehicles to receive this upgrade for the 2018 model year.

== Development ==
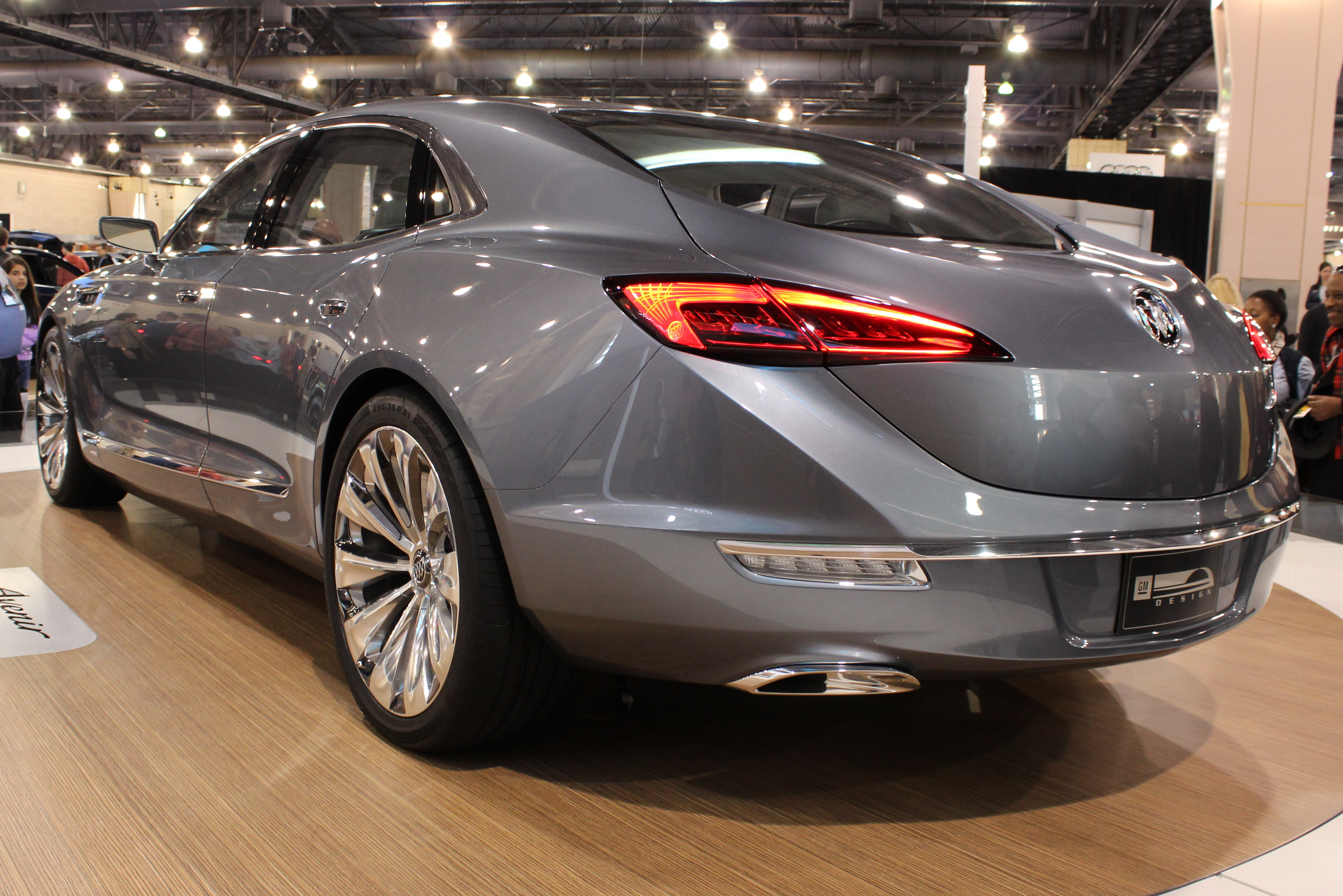
Rear

The Avenir was unveiled at the 2015 North American International Auto Show as a prototypical concept study on the future of the Buick brand. It was designed in GM's Australian design facility, with its exterior design led by Warrack Leach.

== Technology ==
The vehicle features a new generation direct-injected V6 engine, cylinder deactivation with stop-start technology, a 12-inch touchpad infotainment system, four occupant luxury seating, full LED lighting, 4G connectivity, selectable suspension settings, 9-speed automatic transmission and a system that General Motors has referred to as a "dual-clutch all-wheel drive system". It is reportedly built on the Omega platform that is shared with the Cadillac CT6 flagship sedan.

== Possible production ==
Though the vehicle is a concept, it is widely speculated that Buick will launch a production version as GM has stated that Buick will receive an Omega platform sedan derivative and market conditions, especially in the Chinese market are optimum for such a vehicle. However, GM has said that they have no plans to build the vehicle, nor ever intended to build it.

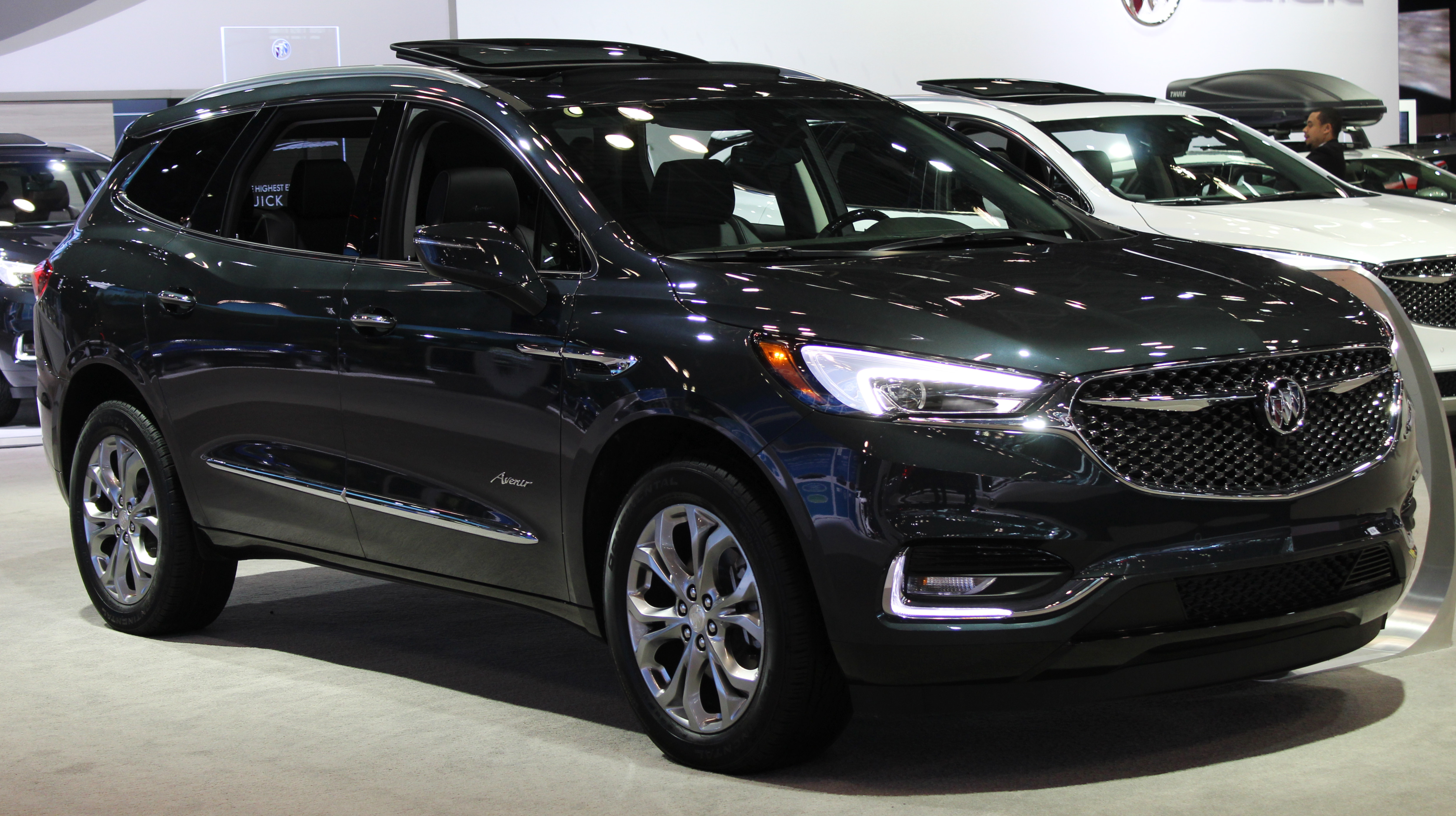
2019 Buick Enclave Avenir at the 2019 New York International Auto Show

In October 2017, Buick made Avenir a premium top-of-the-line sub-brand, similar to GMC’s Denali and Chevrolet’s Signature series. The Buick LaCrosse and Buick Enclave were the first vehicles to receive this upgrade for the 2018 model year.

== See also ==
- Buick Avista
- Opel Insignia concept
