= General Motors Alpha platform =

GM Alpha platform
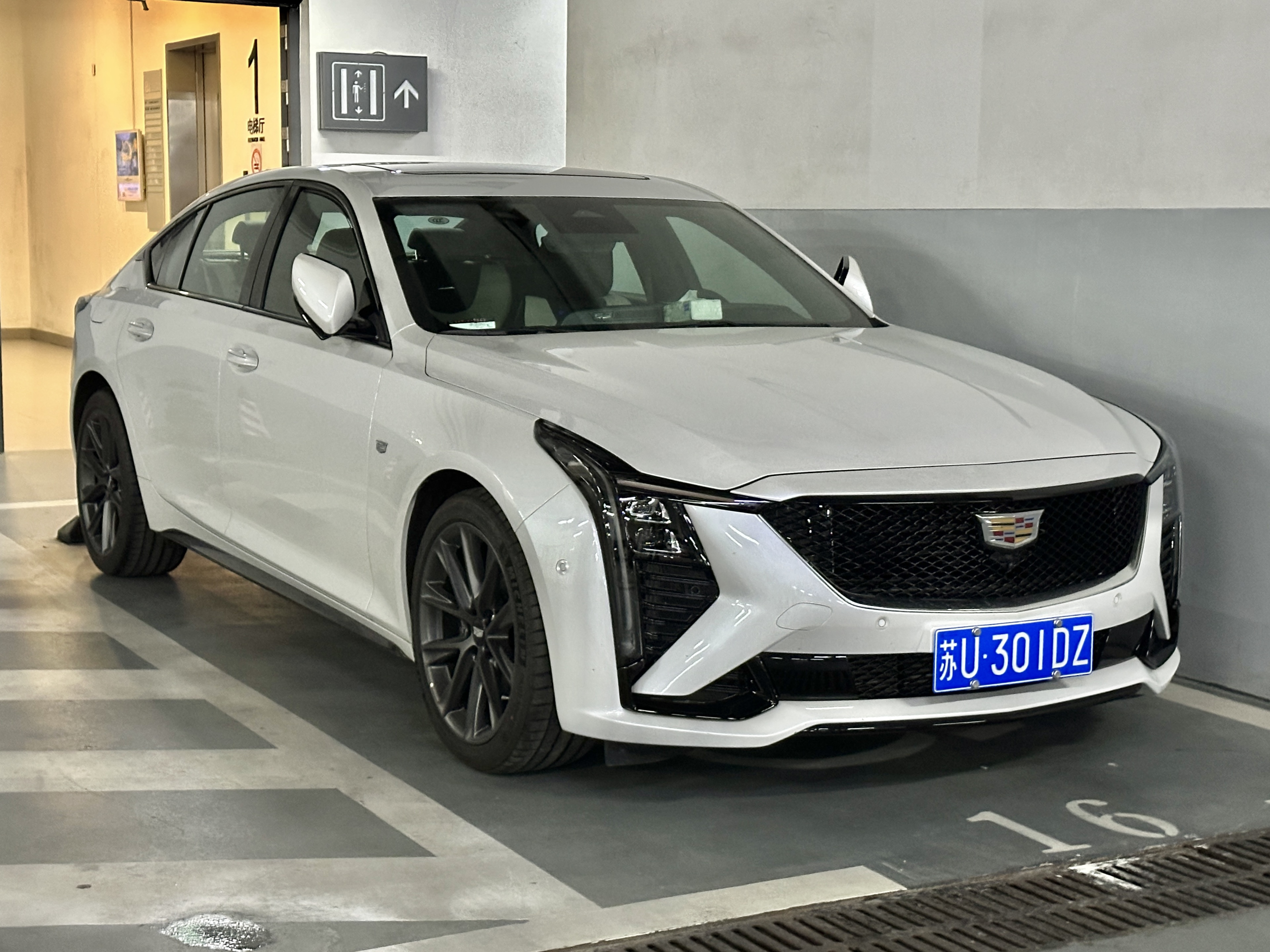
- 2025 Cadillac CT5

Overview
- Manufacturer: General Motors
- Production: July 2012 – present
- Assembly: United States: Lansing, Michigan (Lansing Grand River Assembly); China: Shanghai (Shanghai GM)

Body and chassis
- Class: Compact executive car (D); Midsize Executive car (E)
- Layout: FR (Front-engine, rear-wheel drive); F4 (Front-engine, four-wheel drive)
- Body styles: 2-door coupé; 4-door sedan
- Vehicles: Cadillac ATS (D); Cadillac CTS (Third generation) (E); Chevrolet Camaro (sixth generation) (D)

Powertrain
- Engines: 2.5 L LCV Ecotec I4 (gasoline); 2.0 L LTG Ecotec I4 (t/c gasoline) 3.0 L LGY V6 (twin t/c gasoline); 3.6 L LFX V6 (gasoline); 3.6 L LGX V6 (gasoline); 3.6 L LF3 V6 (twin t/c gasoline); 3.6 L LF4 V6 (twin t/c gasoline); 6.2 L LT1 V8 (gasoline); 6.2 L LT4 V8 (gasoline)
- Transmissions: 6-speed Tremec TR6060 manual; 6-speed Tremec M3L TR3160 manual; 6-speed GM Hydra-Matic 6L45 automatic; 8-speed Aisin TL-80SN automatic; 8-speed GM Hydra-Matic 8L90 automatic; 10-speed 10L90 automatic

Dimensions
- Wheelbase: 109.3 in (2,776 mm); 116.0 in (2,946 mm)

Chronology
- Predecessor: GM Sigma platform (Midsize); GM Zeta platform (for the Chevrolet Camaro)
- Successor: GM VSS-R

The GM Alpha platform currently underpins General Motors' compact to mid-size, front-engine, rear-wheel and four-wheel drive vehicles. Platform basics include MacPherson struts on the front, 5 link independent rear, use of high strength steel and aluminum, and an overall focus on reducing weight. The GM Alpha platform made its debut in the 2013 Cadillac ATS, which entered production in July 2012.

== History ==
Prior to the August 2012 debut of the compact Cadillac ATS, the first vehicle produced on the GM Alpha platform, Cadillac's smallest vehicle was the mid-size CTS. The CTS was priced the same as compact competitors like the Audi A4, the BMW 3 Series and the Mercedes-Benz C-Class but was noticeably larger and heavier, comparable in size and weight to the mid-size BMW 5 Series. Although Cadillac believed that customers would favor a 5 Series-sized car at a 3 Series price, that assumption proved to be incorrect. Cadillac's research found that target customers who already owned vehicles like the 3 Series or A4 didn't want a larger vehicle. General Motors chose to use an updated and lightened version of the GM Zeta platform developed in 2004 by Holden Motors in Australia, the TT36 Torana prototype; that car would eventually become the ATS.

=== Development rationale ===
During the early development of the Cadillac ATS, General Motors engineers determined that downsizing the GM Sigma II platform that underpinned the second-generation CTS would result in a vehicle that was too heavy and that using an economical, front-wheel drive platform would sacrifice performance. Under the leadership of Dave Leone, General Motors engineers created a brand-new platform which was designed to be light and compact, capable of handling both rear- and all-wheel drive configurations and having a near 50/50 weight distribution. The new platform developed by the General Motors engineers for the ATS is now called the GM Alpha platform.

=== Production start ===
General Motors began assembling Cadillac ATS sedans intended for sale to customers on 26 July 2012.

General Motors began assembling third generation Cadillac CTS sedans intended for sale to customers on 16 September 2013.

Applications:

- 2013–2019 Cadillac ATS
- 2014–2019 Cadillac CTS
- 2016–2024 Chevrolet Camaro
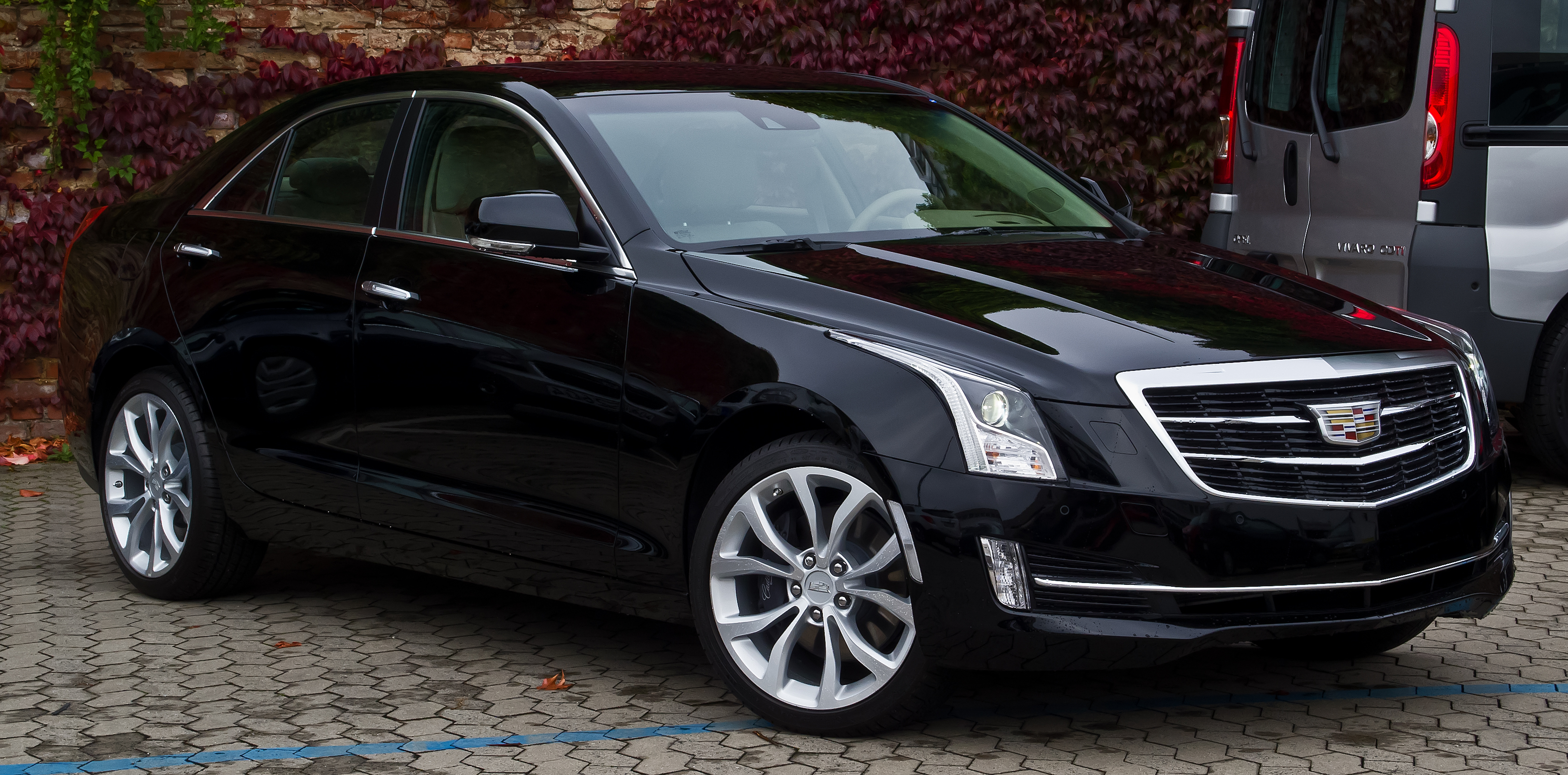
Cadillac ATS

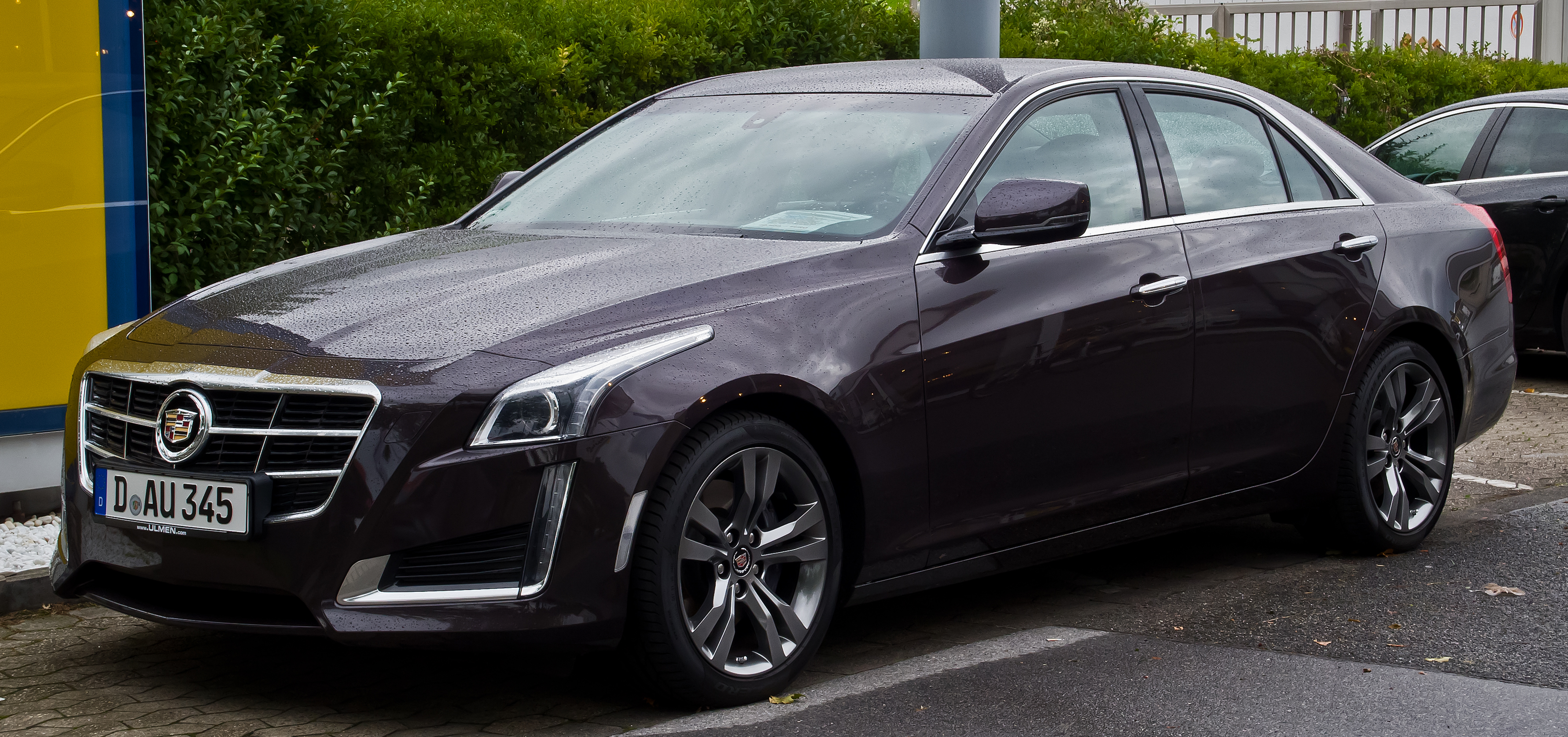
Cadillac CTS

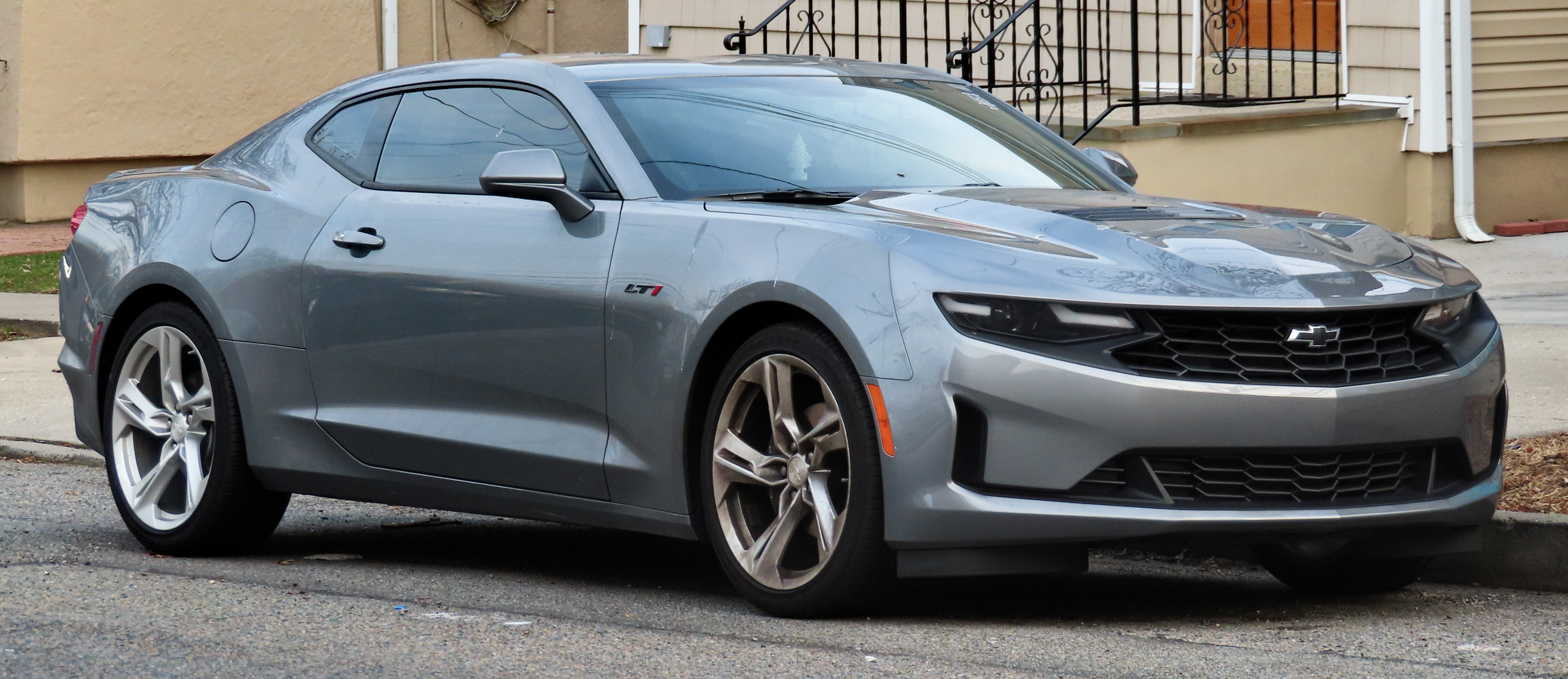
Chevrolet Camaro

=== Alpha 2 ===
Applications:

- 2020–2026 Cadillac CT4
- 2020–present Cadillac CT5
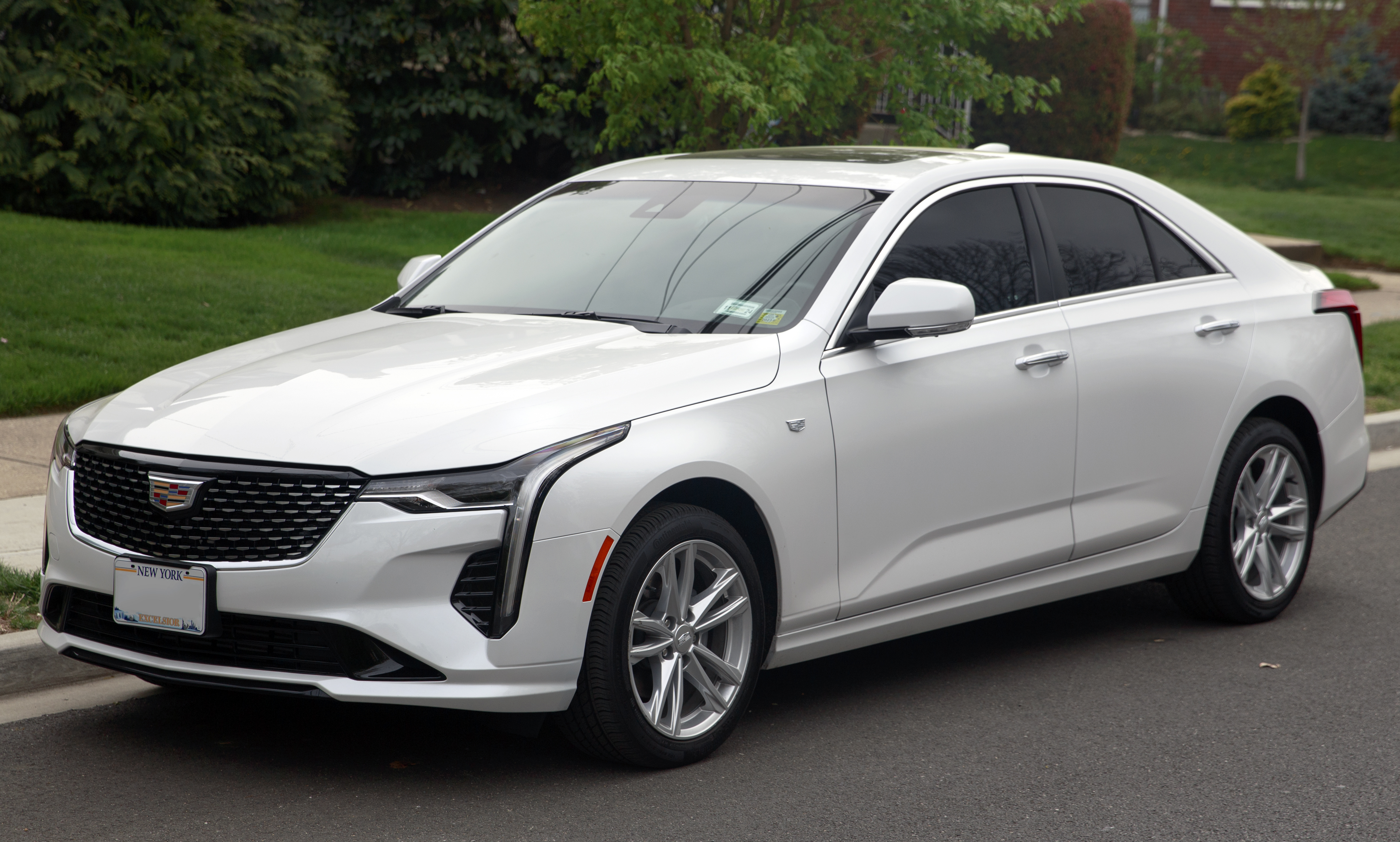
Cadillac CT4

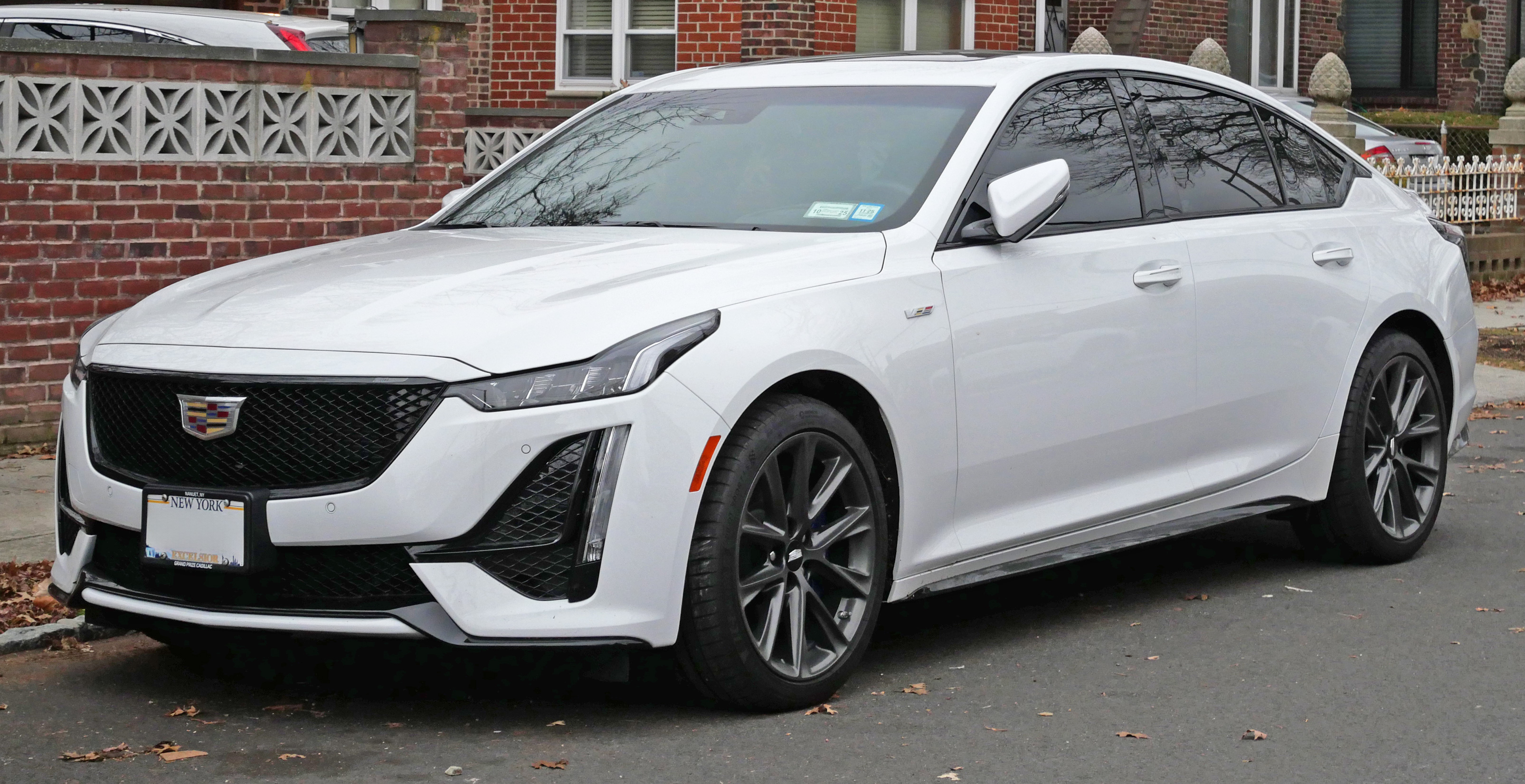
Cadillac CT5

== See also ==
- List of General Motors platforms
