= List of Buick vehicles =

This is a list of vehicles marketed by the Buick division of General Motors, which currently operate in the U.S., Canada, Mexico and China.

== Current models ==
Vehicles exclusive to China

Model	Calendar year introduced	Current model		Description
Model	Calendar year introduced	Introduced	Update	Description
Cars
Electra GS	2027	2027	—	Plug-in hybrid mid-size sedan.
Electra L7	2025	2025	—	Battery electric and Range extender full-size sedan.
LaCrosse	2004	2023	—	Flagship mid-size luxury sedan slotted above the Regal in the brand lineup. Discontinued in North America after 2019, continued production in China.
Regal	1973	2017	2023	Mid-size sedan, fastback (Sportback), and station wagon (TourX). Discontinued in North America after 2020, continued production in China.
Velite 6	2019	2019	—	Compact alternative fuel vehicle station wagon-styled liftback. Available as a battery-electric.
Verano (China)	2015	2021	—	Compact sedan. Produced in North America from 2011 to 2016, continued production in China. Third generation is sold alongside the outgoing second-generation as the Verano Pro.
Crossovers/SUVs
Electra E5	2023	2023	2025	Battery electric low-slung mid-size crossover.
Electra E7	2026	2026	—	Plug-in hybrid mid-size crossover.
Enclave	2007	2024	—	Full-size crossover SUV. Closely related to the Chevrolet Traverse.
Encore GX	2019	2019	2023	Subcompact crossover SUV manufactured by GM Korea in South Korea.
Envision	2014	2020	2024	Compact crossover SUV. Second generation is marketed in China alongside the outgoing first-generation as the Envision S.
Envision Plus	2021	2021	2024	Mid-size crossover SUV, Long-wheelbase version of the Envision that serves as a three-row crossover SUV variant of the regular Buick Envision S in China.
Envista	2023	2023	—	Compact crossover SUV manufactured by GM Korea in South Korea.
Minivans
Electra Encasa	2025	2025	-	Battery electric and Extended range electric full-size minivan.
Century	2022	2022	-	Two and Three-row full-size luxury minivan.
GL8 Lu Zun PHEV	1999	2024	-	Three-row full-size PHEV and ICE minivan sold exclusively in China by SAIC-GM. the 3rd generation is sold as the GL8 Lu Zun PHEV, GL8 ES Lu Zun, GL8 Lu Shang and GL8 Onshore Business
GL8 ES Lu Zun	1999	2016	2024	Three-row full-size PHEV and ICE minivan sold exclusively in China by SAIC-GM. the 3rd generation is sold as the GL8 Lu Zun PHEV, GL8 ES Lu Zun, GL8 Lu Shang and GL8 Onshore Business
GL8 Lu Shang	1999	2025	-	Three-row full-size PHEV and ICE minivan sold exclusively in China by SAIC-GM. the 3rd generation is sold as the GL8 Lu Zun PHEV, GL8 ES Lu Zun, GL8 Lu Shang and GL8 Onshore Business
GL8 Onshore Business	1999	2025	-	Three-row full-size PHEV and ICE minivan sold exclusively in China by SAIC-GM. the 3rd generation is sold as the GL8 Lu Zun PHEV, GL8 ES Lu Zun, GL8 Lu Shang and GL8 Onshore Business

== Previously manufactured models ==
=== Original models ===
Exterior	Name	Introd.	Discont.	Platforms	Gen.	Information / notes
	Model B	1903	1904		1	The first automobile made by the Buick Company.
	Four	1909	1915		1	Passenger car, the first model as a General Motors division.
	Six	1914	1925		1	Senior model to the Four
	Master Six	1925	1928	B-body	1	
	Standard Six	1925	1929	A-body	1	
	Limited	1931	1942	C-body	2	Full-size car
	Century	1936	2005	B-body (1936–1958); A-body (1973–1996); W-body (1997–2005)	6	Full-size car (1936–1958), mid-size car (1973–2005)
	Roadmaster	1936	1958	C-body	7	Full-size car, Buick's flagship car during 1946–1957
	Special	1936	1969	B-body (1936–1958); Y-body (1961–1963); A-body (1964–1969)	4	Full-size (1936–1958), compact (1961–1963), mid-size (1964–1969)
	Super	1939	1958	C-body	5	Full-size car
	Skylark	1953	1998	A-body (1964–1972); X-body (1975–1985); N-body (1985–1998)	6	Changed dynamically from two-door car to four-door car.
	Electra	1959	1990	C-body (RWD) (1959–1984); C-body (FWD) (1985–1990)	6	Full-size luxury car
	Invicta	1959	1963	B-body	2	Full-size car succeeding Century
	LeSabre	1959	2005	B-body (1959–1985); H-body (1986–1999); G-body (2000–2005)	8	Full-size car succeeding Special
	Riviera	1962	1999	E-body (1963–1976, 1979–1993); B-body (1977–1978); G-body (1995–1999)	8	Personal coupe
	Wildcat	1963	1970	B-body	2	Full-size car succeeding Invicta
	Estate wagon	1970	1990	B-body (1970, 1977–1990); C-body (1971–1976)	3	Full-size station wagon
	Centurion	1970	1973	B-body	1	Full-size car succeeding Wildcat
	GSX	1970	1972		1	Muscle car
	Apollo	1973	1975	X-body	1	Compact car
	Skyhawk	1974	1989	H-body (1975–1980); J-body (1982–1989)	2	Subcompact car
	Somerset	1984	1987	N-body	1	Compact car. Renamed "Skylark" in 1987.
	Reatta	1987	1991	E-body	1	Grand tourer coupe and convertible.
	Park Avenue	1990	2012	C-body (1991–1996); G-body (1997–2005); GM Zeta platform (2007–2012)	3	Full-size luxury sedan succeeding Electra. Discontinued in North America in 2005. GM Zeta platform version sold in China 2007–2012.
	Roadmaster (revival)	1991	1996	B-body	1	
	Rendezvous	2001	2007	U-body	1	Midsize crossover
	Rainier	2003	2007	GMT360	1	Midsize luxury SUV.
	Excelle	2003	2023	GEM	2	Compact sedan marketed in China
	Terraza	2004	2007	U-body	1	Minivan
	Lucerne	2005	2011	G-body	1	Full-size sedan
	Excelle GT	2009	2023	PATAC K	2	Compact sedan marketed in China
	Verano (North America)	2010	2016	Delta II	1	Compact sedan
	Encore	2012	2022	GEM	2	Subcompact crossover SUV marketed in China
	GL6	2017	2023	PATAC K	1	Compact MPV marketed in China
	Enclave (China)	2019	2025	C1XX	1	Mid-size crossover SUV, with a design different from its North American counterpart
	Velite 7	2020	2022	BEV2	1	Electric subcompact crossover SUV marketed in China
	Electra E4	2023	2025	BEV3	1	Electric mid-size crossover SUV marketed in China

=== Global ===
Rebadged models, developed in or outside North America:

Exterior	Name	Introd.	Discont.	Platforms	Gen.	Orig.	Orig. model
	Opel (Note: Name given in the U.S.)	1975	1979	T-body	1	JPN	Isuzu Gemini (Note: Subcompact car.)
	Sail (Note: Name given in China.)	2001	2004	GM4200	1	GER	Opel Corsa B (Note: In 2005, the car was totally redesigned by joint venture SAIC-GM and renamed Chevrolet Sail, leaving the 'Buick' aside.)
	Excelle HRV	2003	2010	Daewoo J	1	KOR	Daewoo Lacetti (Note: Sold exclusively in China.)
	Royaum	2005	2006	V-body	1	AUS	Holden Caprice (Note: Full-size sedan, sold exclusively in China)
	Cascada	2012	2019	Delta II	1	GER	Opel Cascada (Note: Convertible.)
	Velite 5	2016	2019	D2UX	1	USA	Chevrolet Volt (2nd. gen.) (Note: Compact plug-in hybrid, sold exclusively in China.)

== Concept models ==
Buick concept cars

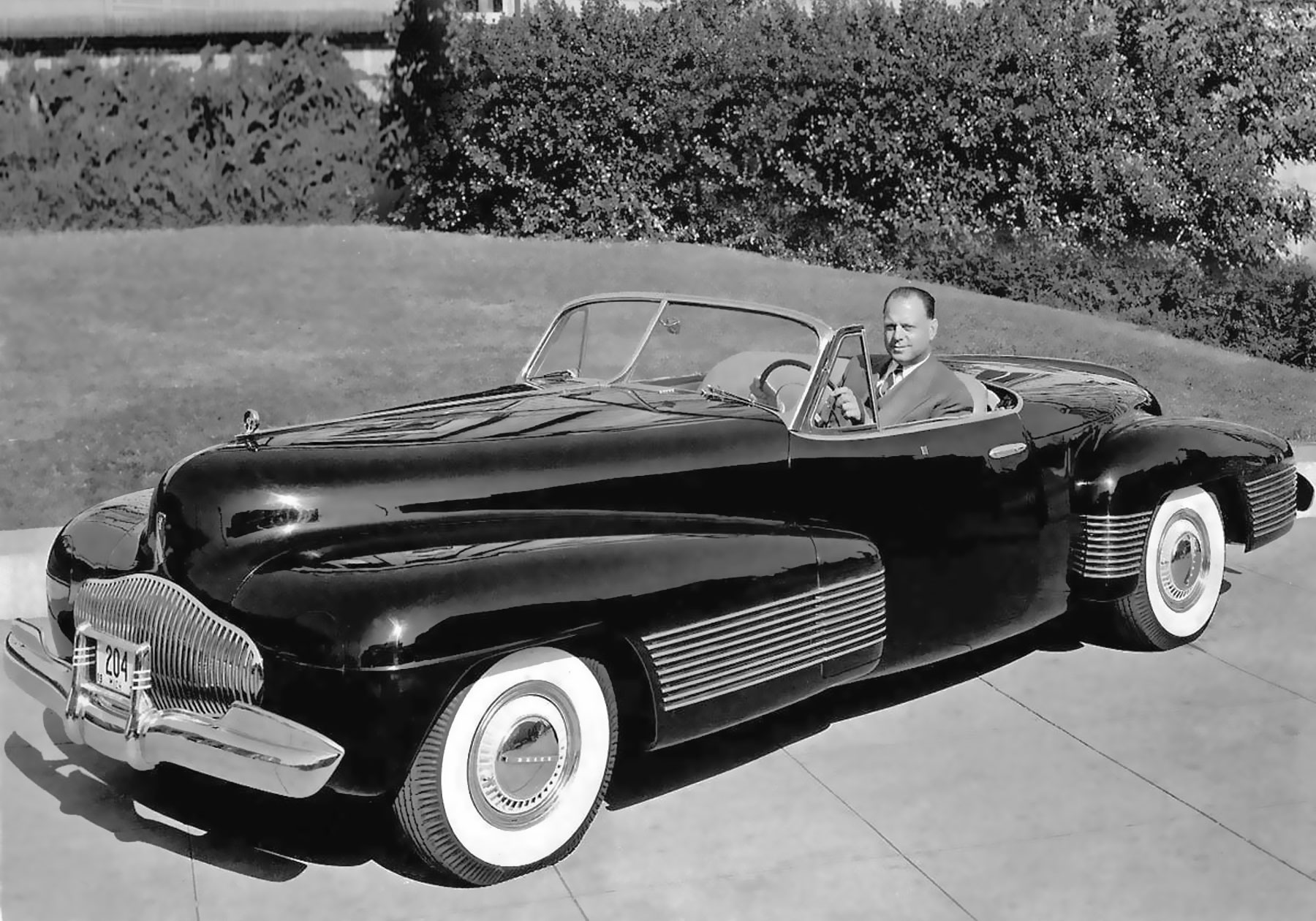
Y-Job (1938)

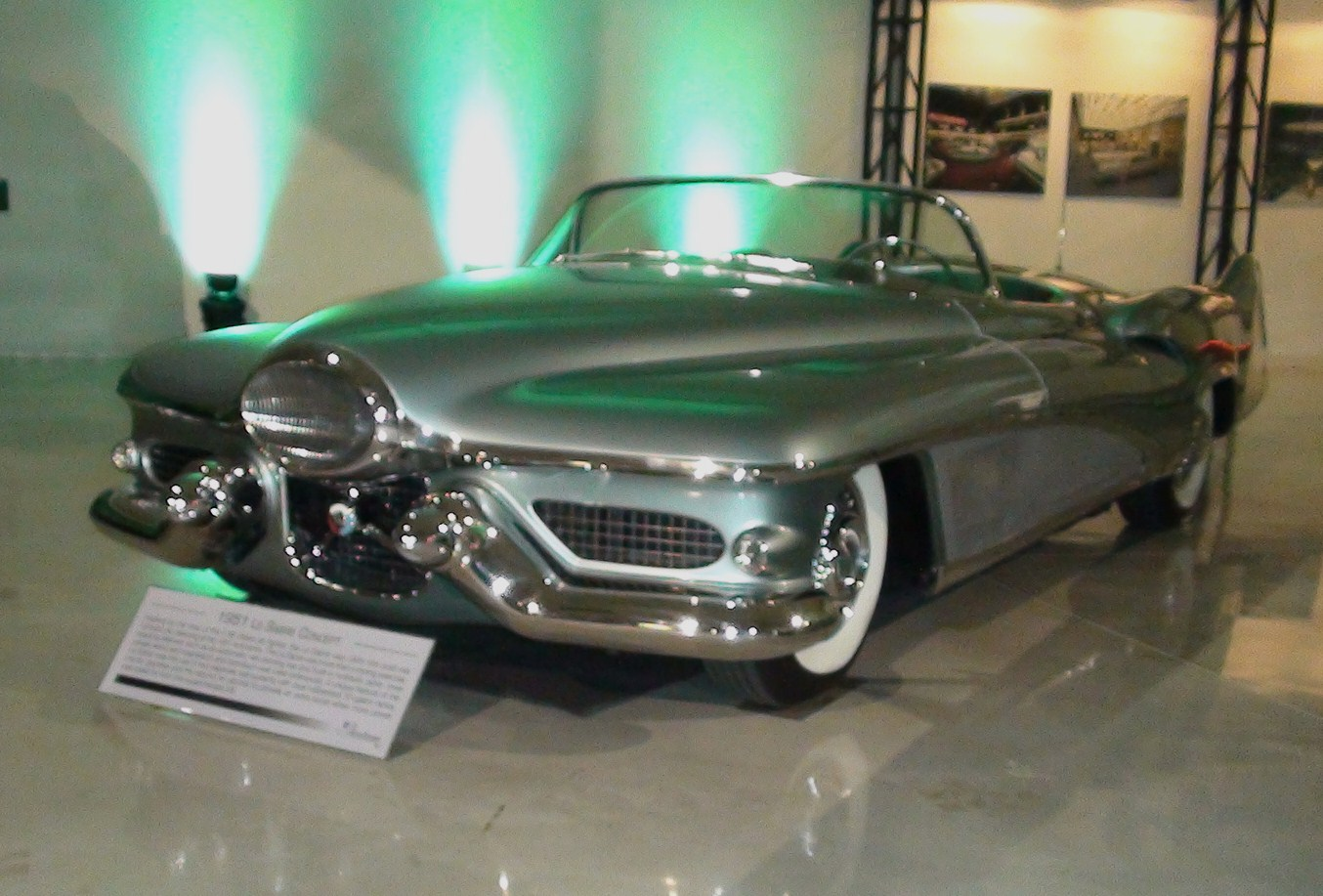
LeSabre (1951)

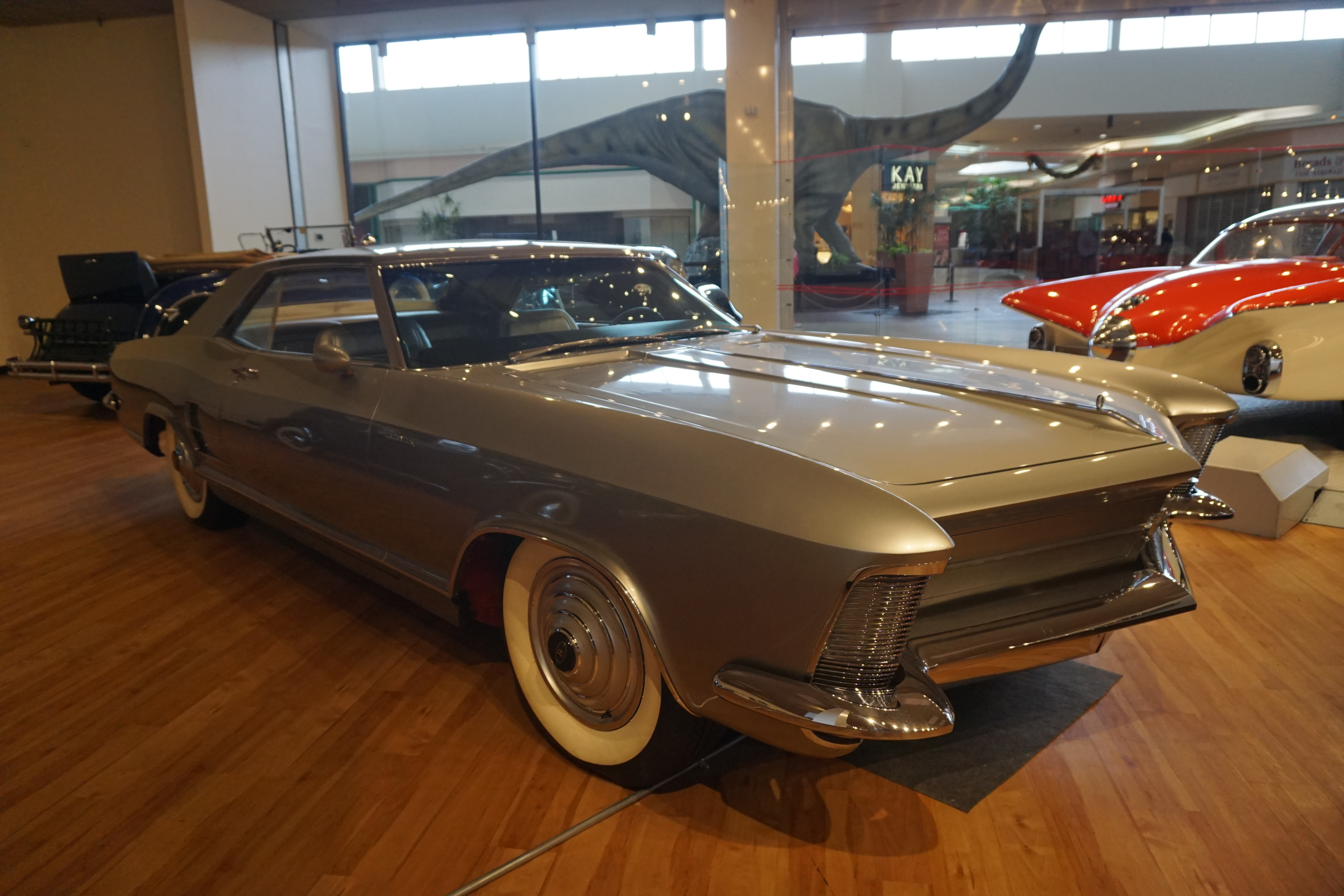
Silver Arrow (1963)

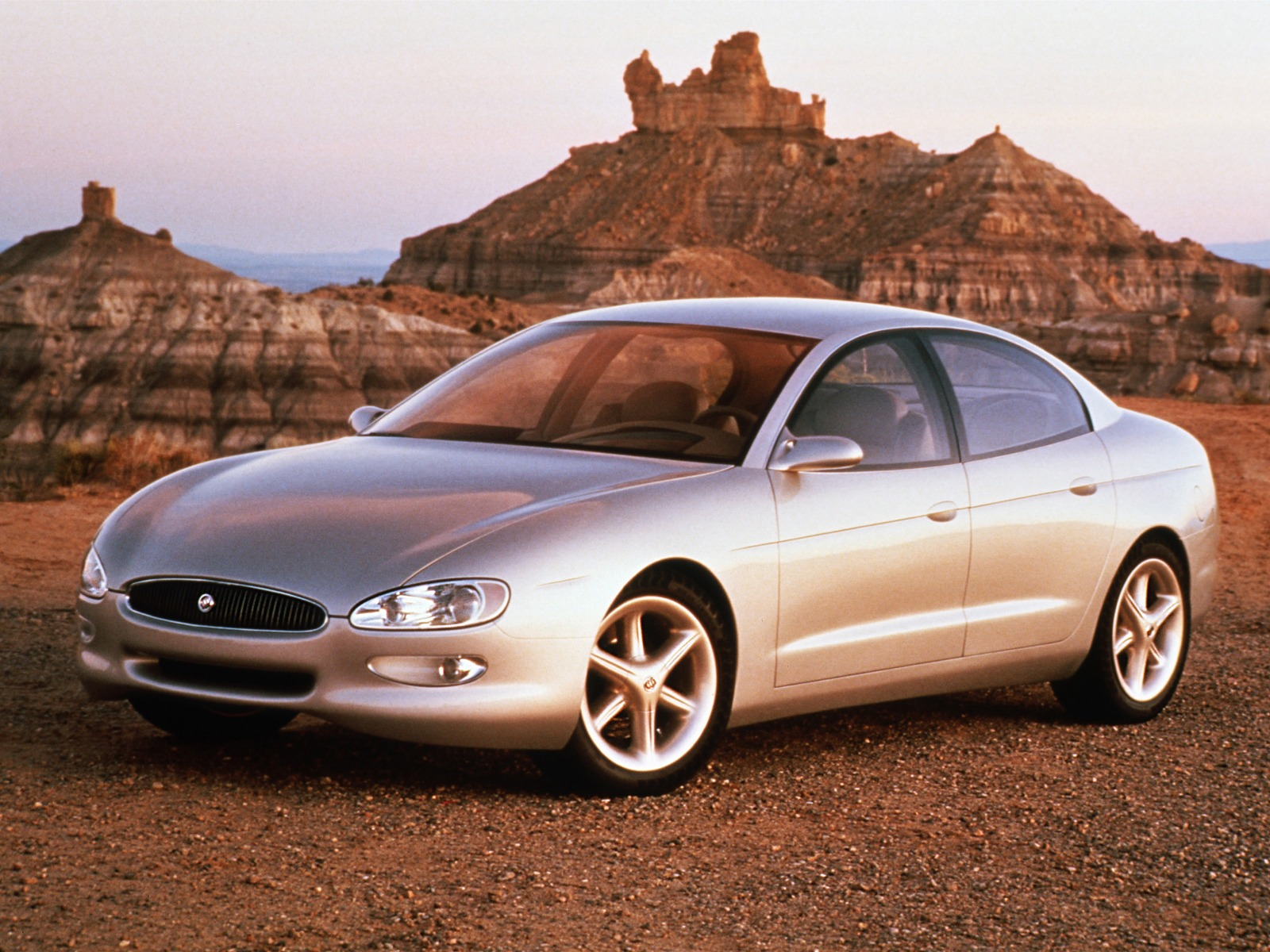
XP2000 (1995)

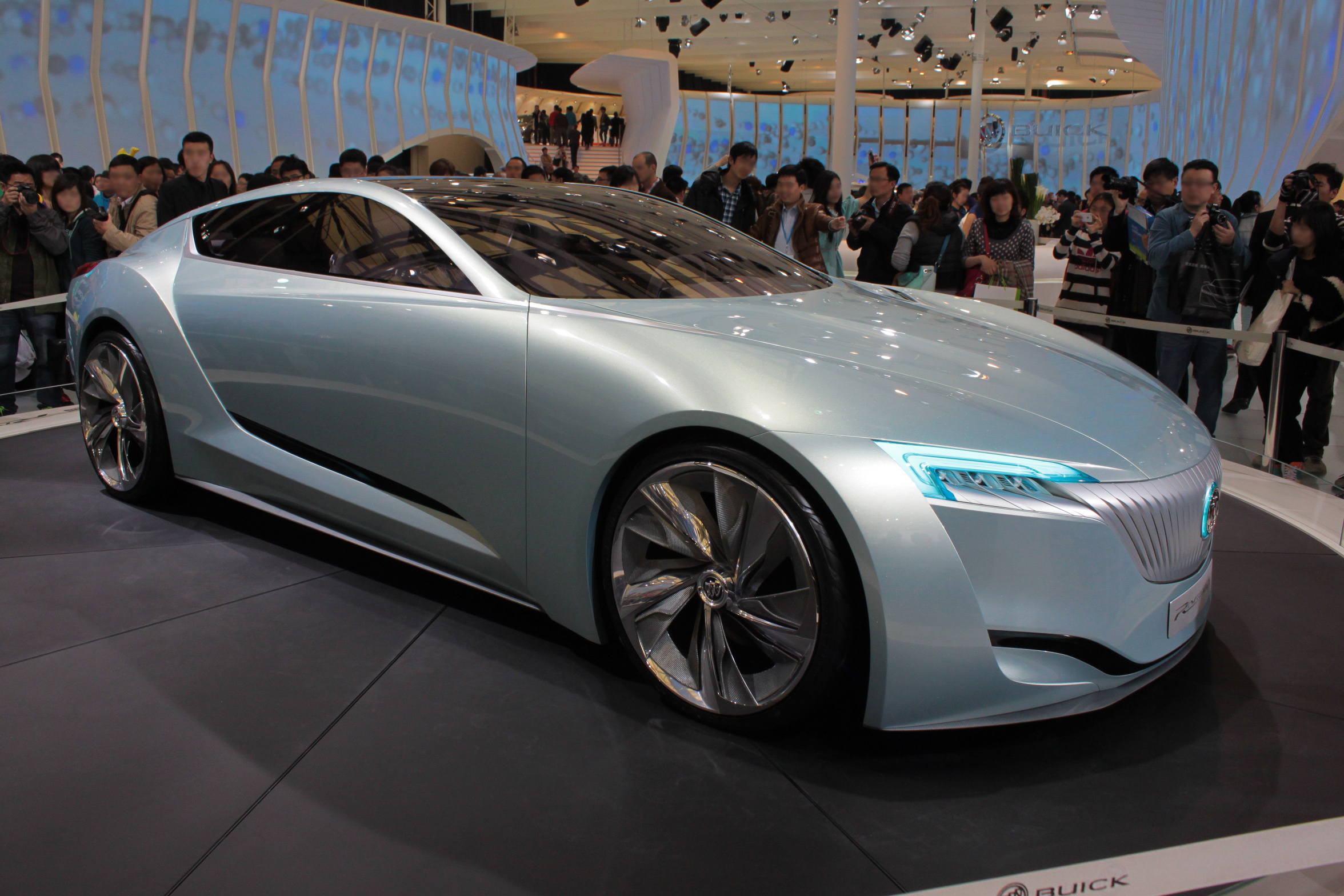
Riviera Concept II (2013)

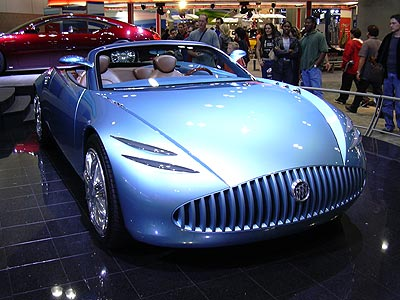
Bengal (2001)

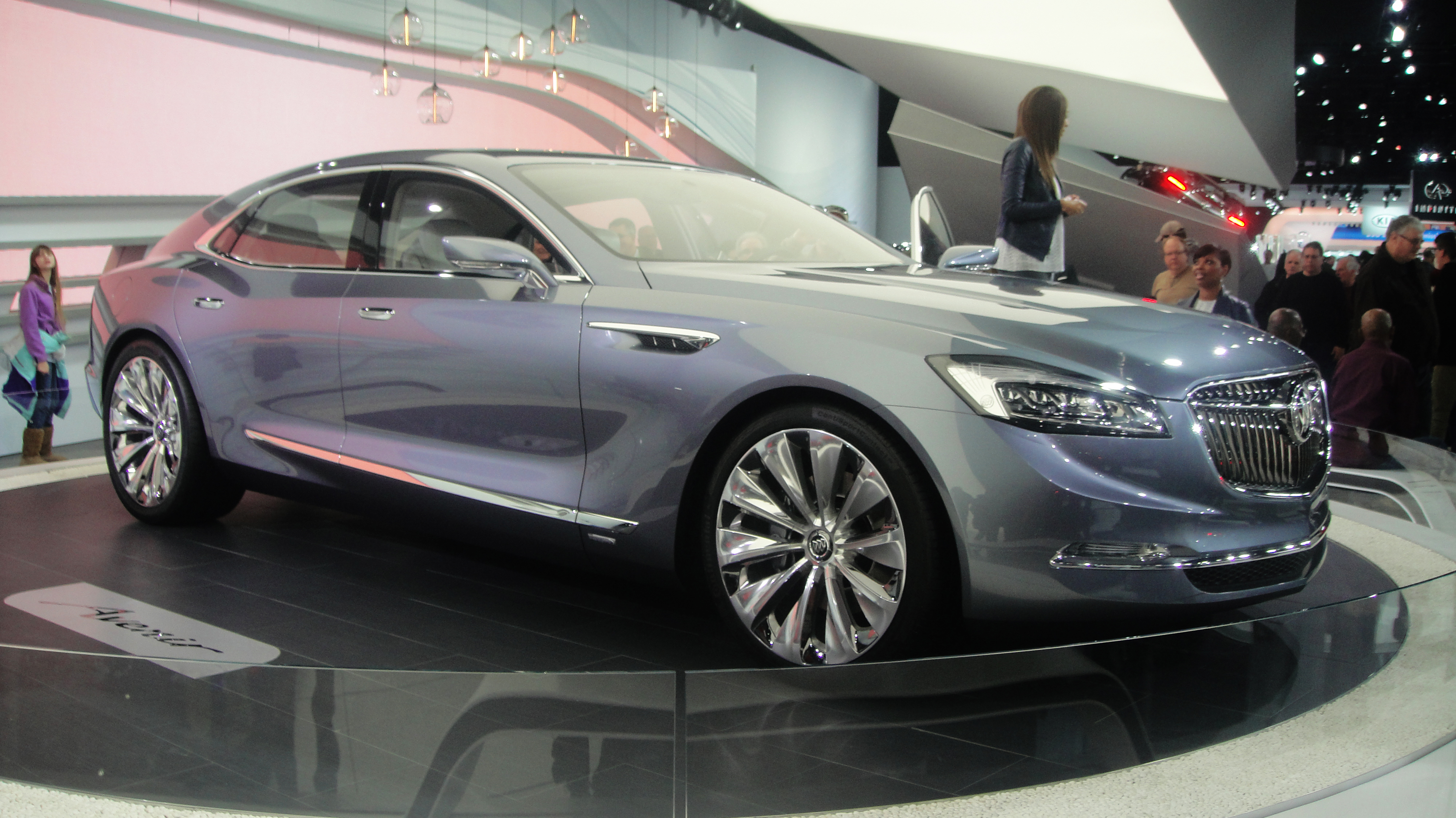
Avenir (2015)

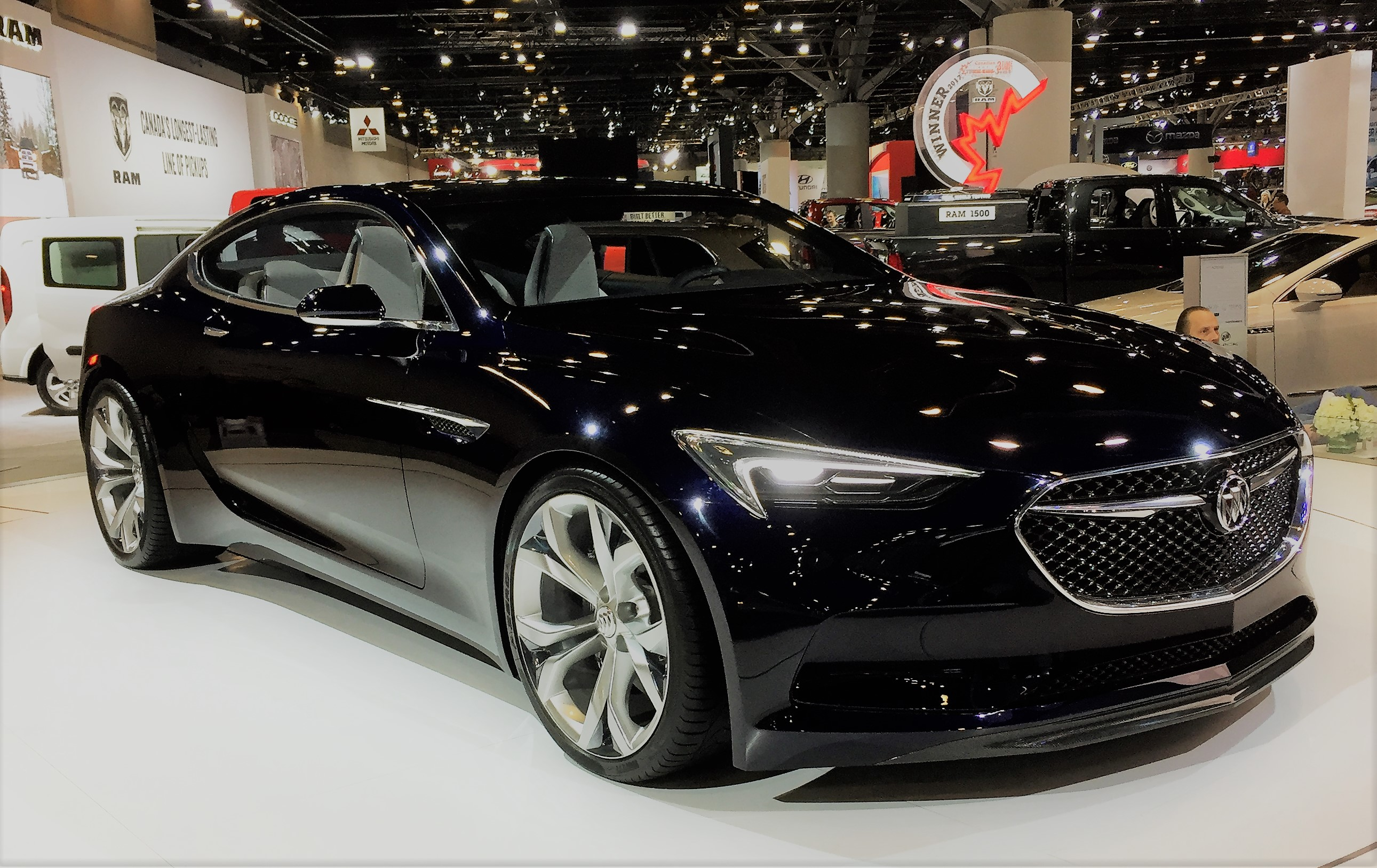
Avista (2016)

- Avenir (2015)
- Avista (2016)
- Bengal (2001)
- Blackhawk (2000)
- Bolero (1990)
- Business (2009)
- Centieme (2003)
- Centurion (1956)
- Century Cruiser (1969)
- Cielo (1999)
- Electra-L (2024)
- Electra-LT (2024)
- Electra GS (2025)
- Electra MPV Precursor (2025)
- Electra Sedan Precursor (2025)
- Electra SUV Precursor (2025)
- Electra-X (2022)
- Electra (2020)
- LaCrosse (2001)
- Lucerne (1988)
- Lucerne Convertible (1990)
- OMPV (2024)
- Park Avenue Essence (1989)
- Questor (1983)
- Riviera Concept (2007)
- Riviera Concept II (2013)
- Silver Arrow (1963)
- Silver Arrow III (1972)
- Sceptre (1992)
- Signia (1998)
- Velite (2004)
- Wildcat (1953)
- Wildcat II (1954)
- Wildcat III (1955)
- Wildcat (1985)
- Wildcat EV (2022)
- XP2000 (1995)
- XP-300 (1951)
- Y-Job (1938)
