= Buick Electra GS =

Plug-in hybrid mid-size car

Overview
- Manufacturer: SAIC-GM
- Production: 2026 (upcoming)

Body and chassis
- Class: Mid-size car
- Body style: 5-door liftback sedan

Powertrain
- Hybrid drivetrain: Plug-in hybrid

Dimensions
- Wheelbase: 2,865 mm (112.8 in)
- Length: 4,979 mm (196.0 in)
- Width: 1,914 mm (75.4 in)
- Height: 1,492–1,496 mm (58.7–58.9 in)

The Buick Electra GS (Chinese: 别克至境GS; pinyin: Biékè Zhìjìng GS) is a plug-in hybrid mid-size sedan produced by SAIC-GM. It is part of the China-exclusive Electra sub-brand.

== Overview ==
Buick first used the Electra GS nameplate on a concept vehicle presented at the 2025 Auto Shanghai, with which the production model shares few design elements. It is positioned below the larger Electra L7.

The Electra GS features a new design language, with U-shaped headlights, a wraparound rear light bar, semi-hidden door handles and a fastback profile.

=== Powertrain ===
The Electra GS is available with two plug-in hybrid powertrains, both of which use a lithium iron phosphate (LFP) battery and an electric motor producing 80 kW (110 hp; 110 PS). The two variants use 1.5-liter turbocharged petrol engines that produce either 72 kW (97 hp; 98 PS) or 115 kW (154 hp; 156 PS).
