= Buick Bolero =

Concept car developed by Buick

Overview
- Type: Concept car
- Production: 1990
- Designer: Phil Garcia

Body and chassis
- Related: Buick Skylark (sixth generation)

Powertrain
- Engine: 3.3 litre V6
- Power output: 206 horsepower

Dimensions
- Wheelbase: 107 inches (270 cm)
- Length: 190 inches (480 cm)
- Width: 70.5 inches (179 cm)
- Height: 53 inches (130 cm)

The Bolero was a concept car showcased by Buick in 1990. Displayed at the Detroit Auto Show in January 1990 and the Chicago Auto Show in February 1990, the Bolero served to preview numerous styling elements of the 1992 Buick Skylark.

The Bolero's styling featured a prominent chromed feature line that moved upward along each side, wrapping around the rear deck, which was slightly higher than the hood. Fiber optics were used throughout, and a built-in cooler was also included in the rear shelf, along with dual cup holders for the front and rear passengers and portable headsets behind the front seats.

The concept featured a 3.3 liter V6 engine producing 206 horsepower at 5200 RPM, and used a 107-inch (270 cm) wheelbase with an overall length of 190 in (480 cm). It was 53 in (130 cm) high and 70.5 in (179 cm) wide.
