= Buick Electra E7 =

Plug-in hybrid mid-size crossover SUV

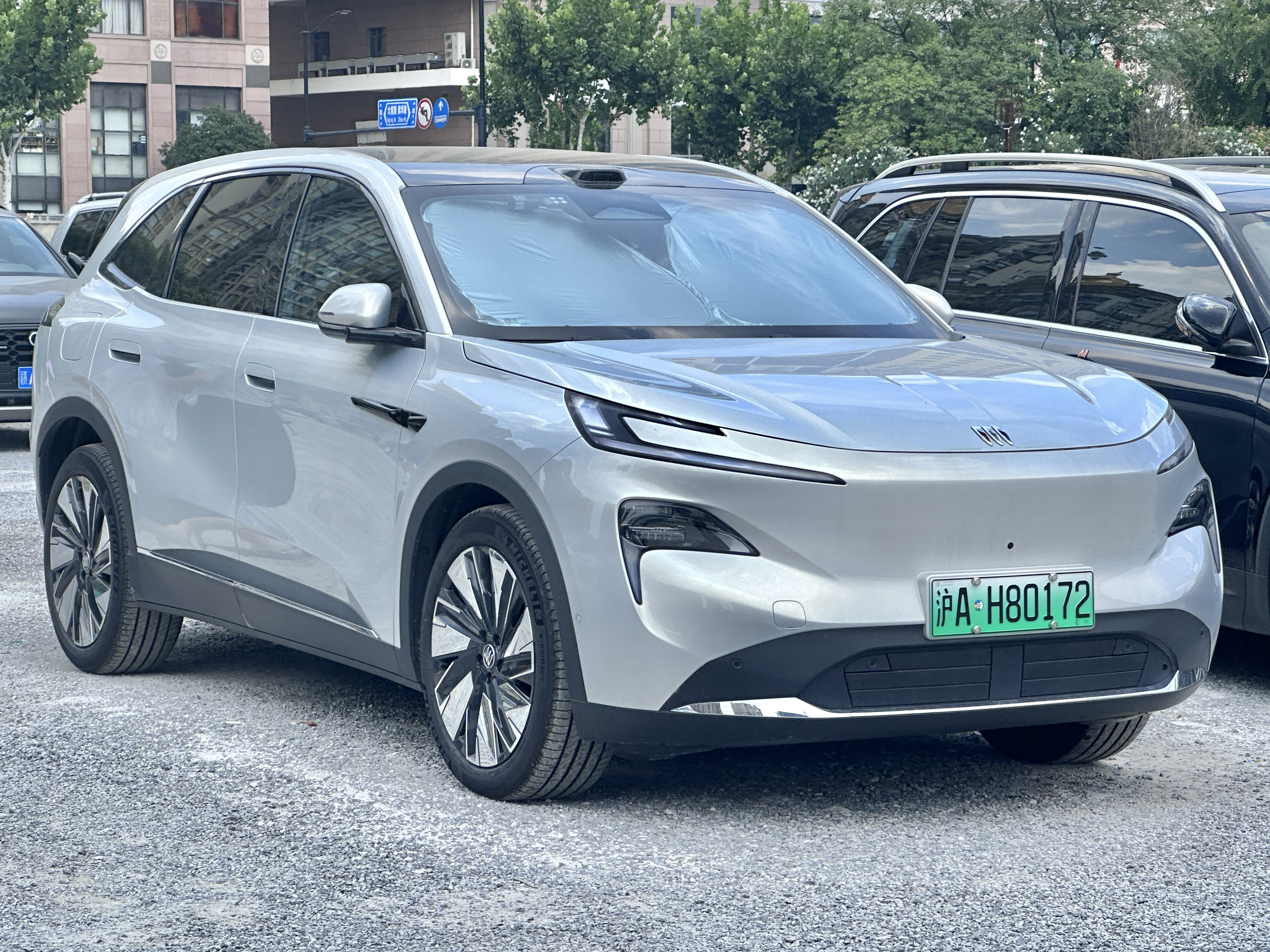

Overview
- Manufacturer: SAIC-GM
- Model code: NCUB
- Production: 2026–present
- Assembly: China: Wuhan, Hubei (SAIC-GM)
- Designer: Pan Asia Technical Automotive Center

Body and chassis
- Class: Mid-size crossover SUV
- Body style: 5-door SUV
- Platform: Xiao Yao
- Related: Buick Electra Encasa; Buick Electra L7

Powertrain
- Engine: Petrol plug-in hybrid: 1.5 L 15FMC I4; 1.5 L LD3 I4 turbo
- Electric motor: 165 kW TZ210XYEEH PMSM
- Power output: 315–369 hp (235–275 kW; 319–374 PS)
- Transmission: 1-speed DHT
- Hybrid drivetrain: Parallel hybrid (PHEV)
- Battery: Ultium LFP REPT Battero; 31.7 kWh Ultium LFP Zenergy
- Range: 1,600 km (990 mi) (CLTC)
- Electric range: 163–168 km (101–104 mi) (WLTP); 230–235 km (143–146 mi) (CLTC)

Dimensions
- Wheelbase: 2,850 mm (112.2 in)
- Length: 4,850 mm (190.9 in)
- Width: 1,910 mm (75.2 in)
- Height: 1,676 mm (66.0 in)
- Curb weight: 1,850–1,995 kg (4,079–4,398 lb)

The Buick Electra E7 (Chinese: 别克至境E7; pinyin: Biékè Zhìjìng E7) is a plug-in hybrid mid-size crossover SUV produced by SAIC-GM. It is the first crossover SUV of the China-exclusive Electra sub-brand to adopt the brand's True Dragon Plug-in Hybrid Pro powertrain. It is the production version of the Electra SUV Precursor concept.

== Overview ==
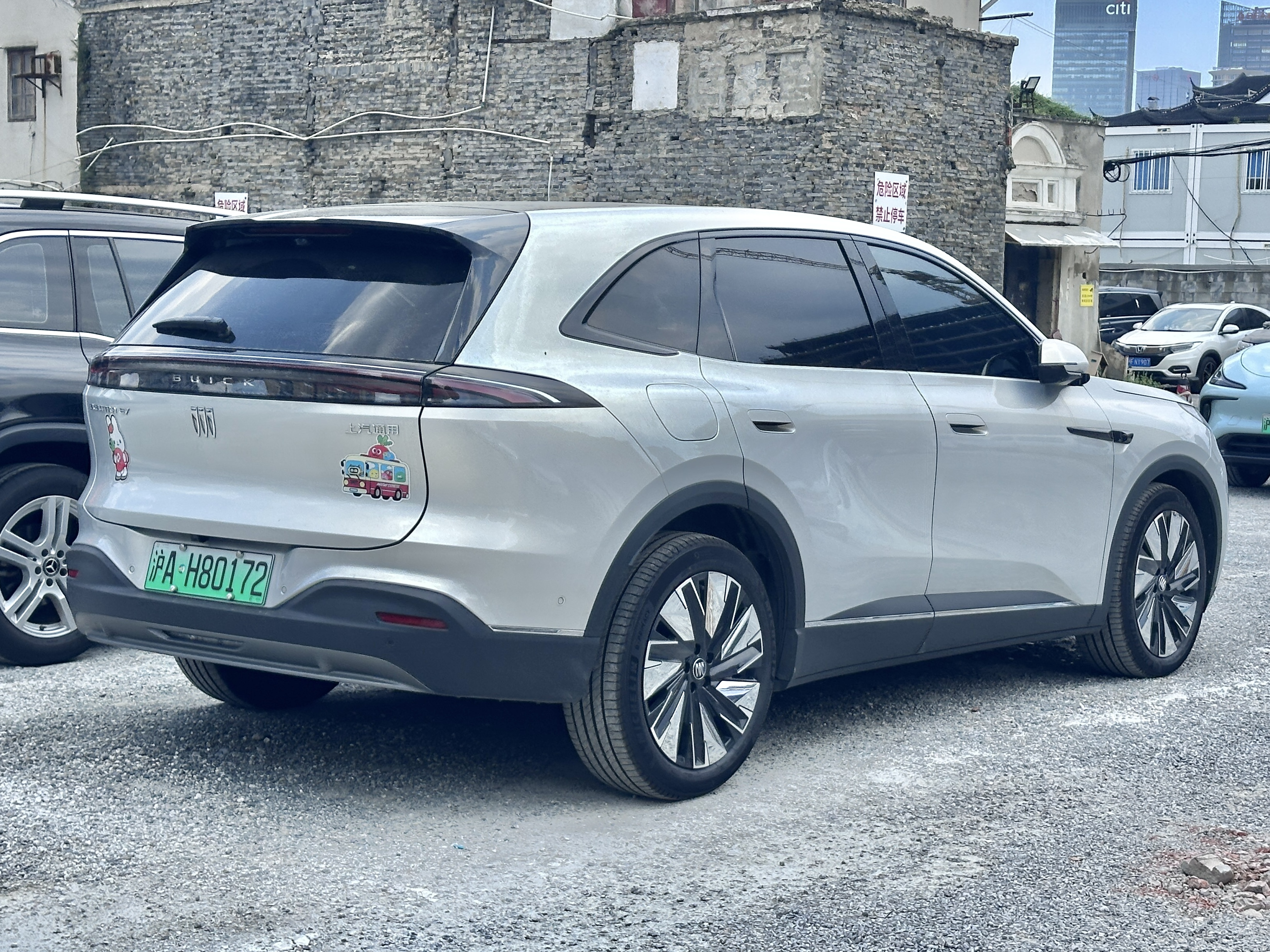
Rear view

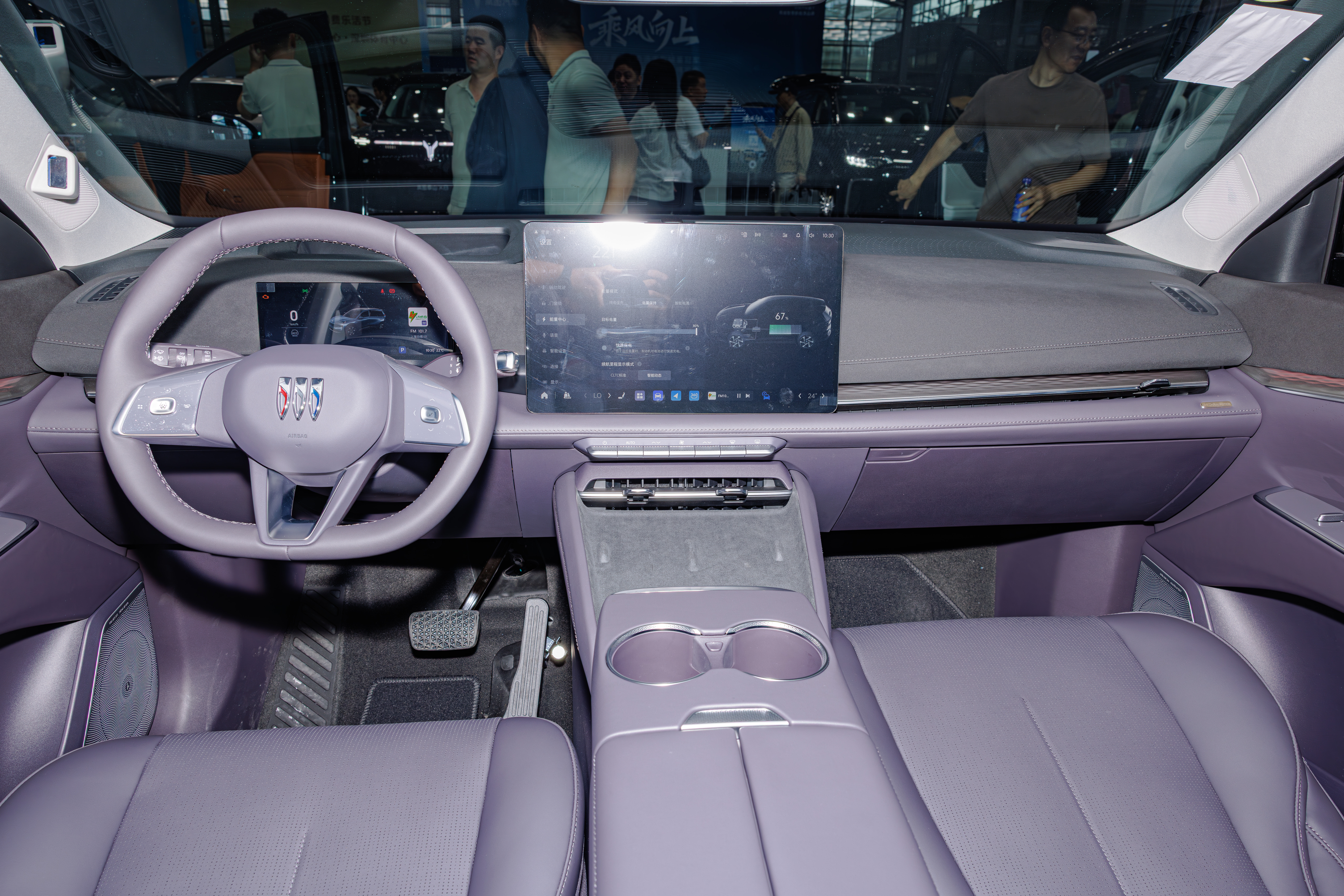
Interior

The Electra SUV Precursor concept was first revealed at Auto Shanghai 2025 in April with the launch of the Electra sub-brand, alongside the Electra Sedan Precursor concept and Electra MPV Precursor concept which became the Buick Electra L7 and Buick Electra Encasa (GL8 Encasa), respectively. The codename of Electra E7 is NCUB.

The production Electra E7 was first revealed on 8 January 2026 alongside MIIT regulatory filings which revealed some specifications. It launched with prices starting from 23200 USD on 22 April 2026.

The Electra E7 is equipped with the brand's Xiaoyao Zhixing ADAS system which is based on Momenta's R6 Flywheel model, along with a Qualcomm Snapdragon 8775P SoC powering the infotainment system.

The Electra E7 is the first-time exported to South Korea market in 30 September 2026.

== Powertrain ==
The Electra E7 is available with a debuting plug-in hybrid system called the True Dragon Plug-in Hybrid Pro. It is equipped with a choice of inline-four petrol engines, either an SAIC-designed 15FMC naturally aspirated 1.5-liter outputting 97 hp (72 kW; 98 PS) or a GM LD3 turbocharged 1.5-liter developed specifically for hybrid use outputting 154 hp (115 kW; 156 PS) and 230 N⋅m (170 lb⋅ft) of torque. Both engines are paired with a 221 hp (165 kW; 224 PS) electric motor. Variants with the weaker engine are powered by an LFP battery pack supplied by REPT Battero and have a top speed of 180 km/h (112 mph), while the stronger engine is paired with a Zenergy-supplied LFP battery with a 210 km/h (130 mph) top speed. The E7 can get up to 235 km (146 mi) of pure-electric range on the CLTC cycle, and a combined range of up to 1,630 km (1,013 mi).

Specifications
Model	Battery		Engine			Motor		System total		Electric range		30–80% charge	0–100 km/h (62 mph)	Top speed	Weight
Model	Type	Weight	Type	Power	Torque	Power	Torque	Power	Torque	WLTP	CLTC	30–80% charge	0–100 km/h (62 mph)	Top speed	Weight
1.5 L PHEV	32.6 kWh LFP Zenergy	252 kg (556 lb)	1.5 L SAIC15FMC I4	94 hp (70 kW; 95 PS) at 5,500 rpm	130 N⋅m (96 lb⋅ft) at 4,500 rpm	221 hp (165 kW; 224 PS)	330 N⋅m (243 lb⋅ft)	318 hp (237 kW; 322 PS)	460 N⋅m (339 lb⋅ft)	168 km (104 mi)	235 km (146 mi)	15 min	7.0 sec	180 km/h (112 mph)	1,950 kg (4,299 lb)
1.5 T PHEV	32.6 kWh LFP Zenergy	252 kg (556 lb)	1.5 L LD3 I4 turbo	148 hp (110 kW; 150 PS) at 5,300 rpm	230 N⋅m (170 lb⋅ft) at 2,500–4,000 rpm	221 hp (165 kW; 224 PS)	330 N⋅m (243 lb⋅ft)	376 hp (280 kW; 381 PS)	560 N⋅m (413 lb⋅ft)	163 km (101 mi)	230 km (143 mi)	15 min	7.1 sec	210 km/h (130 mph)	1,995 kg (4,398 lb)

== Sales ==
On 7 May 2026, Buick announced that the Electra E7 had exceeded 5,000 deliveries on 5 May, two weeks after its launch on 22 April 2026. Additionally, 80% of those deliveries went to families with children.
