= Buick Electra L7 =

Full-size sedan

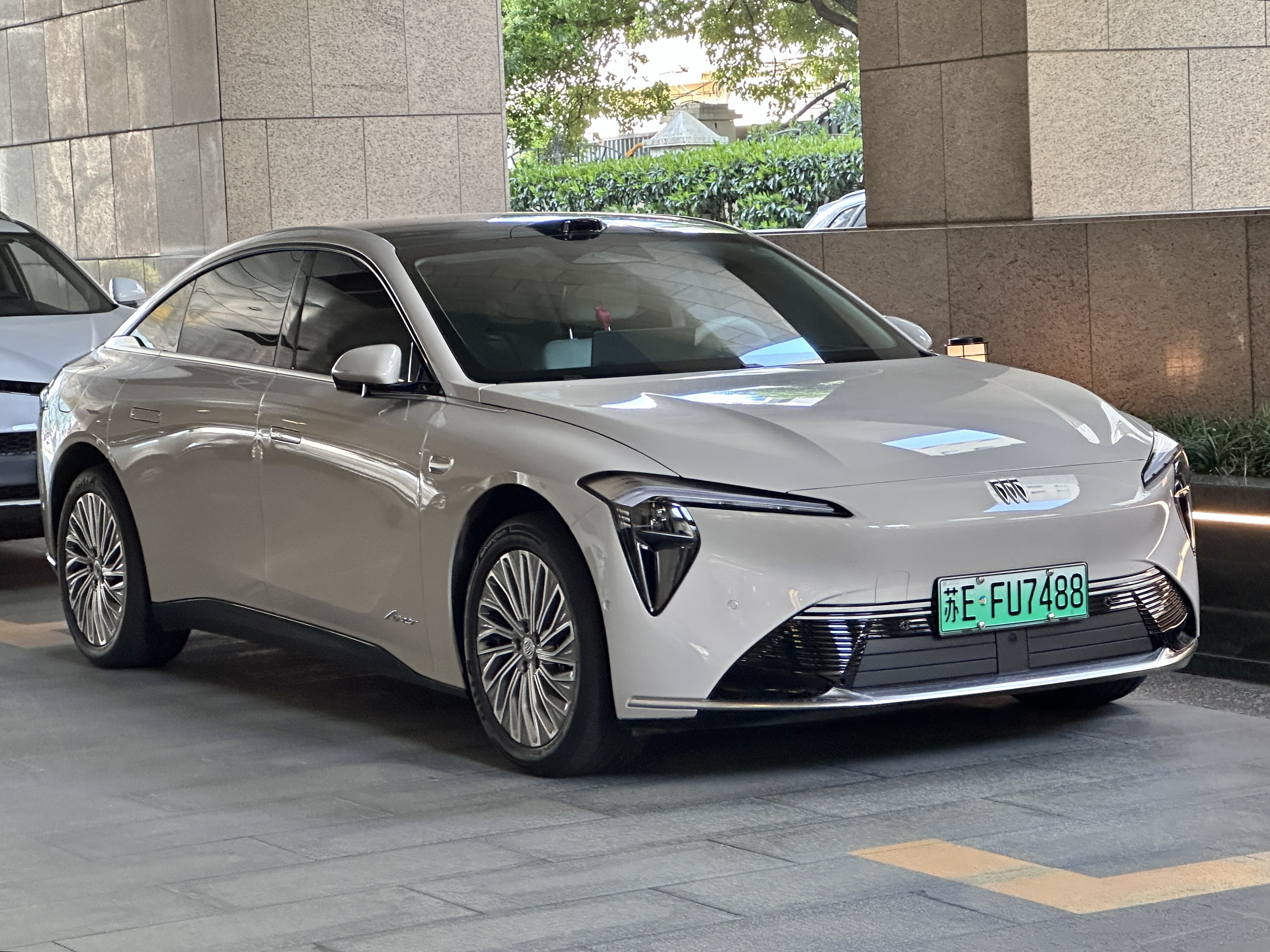

Overview
- Manufacturer: SAIC-GM
- Model code: NDLB
- Production: 2025–present
- Assembly: China: Wuhan, Hubei (SAIC-GM)
- Designer: Pan Asia Technical Automotive Center

Body and chassis
- Class: Full-size car
- Body style: 4-door sedan
- Layout: Rear-motor, rear-wheel drive (EV); Dual-motor, all-wheel-drive (EV); Front-engine, dual-motor, all-wheel-drive (EREV)
- Platform: Xiao Yao
- Related: Buick Electra Encasa; Buick Electra E7

Powertrain
- Engine: Petrol range extender: 1.5 L LD3 I4 turbo
- Electric motor: Permanent magnet synchronous AC
- Power output: EV: 338 hp (252 kW; 343 PS) (RWD); 502 hp (374 kW; 509 PS) (AWD); EREV: 502 hp (374 kW; 509 PS)
- Hybrid drivetrain: Series hybrid (EREV)
- Battery: 40.2 kWh Ultium LFP
- Range: 1,400 km (870 mi) (CLTC)
- Electric range: 302 km (188 mi) (CLTC)

Dimensions
- Wheelbase: 3,000 mm (118.1 in)
- Length: 5,032 mm (198.1 in)
- Width: 1,952 mm (76.9 in)
- Height: 1,500 mm (59.1 in)
- Curb weight: 2,105 kg (4,641 lb)

The Buick Electra L7 (Chinese: 别克至境L7; pinyin: Biékè Zhìjìng L7) is a battery electric and range extender full-size sedan produced by SAIC-GM. It is the first model of the China-exclusive Electra sub-brand and also the first model to be based on the Xiao Yao platform. It is the production version of the Electra Sedan Precursor concept.

== Overview ==
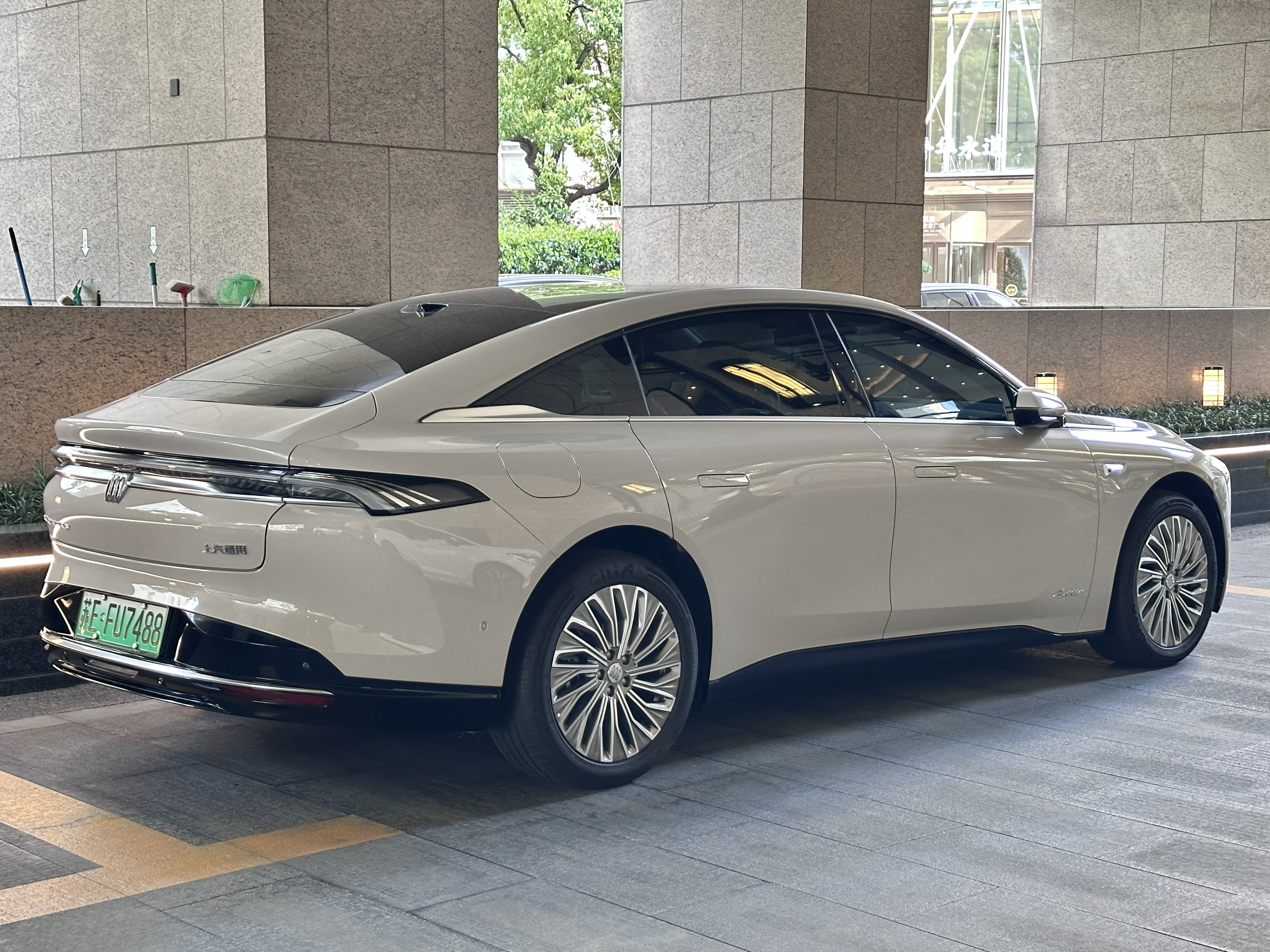
Rear view

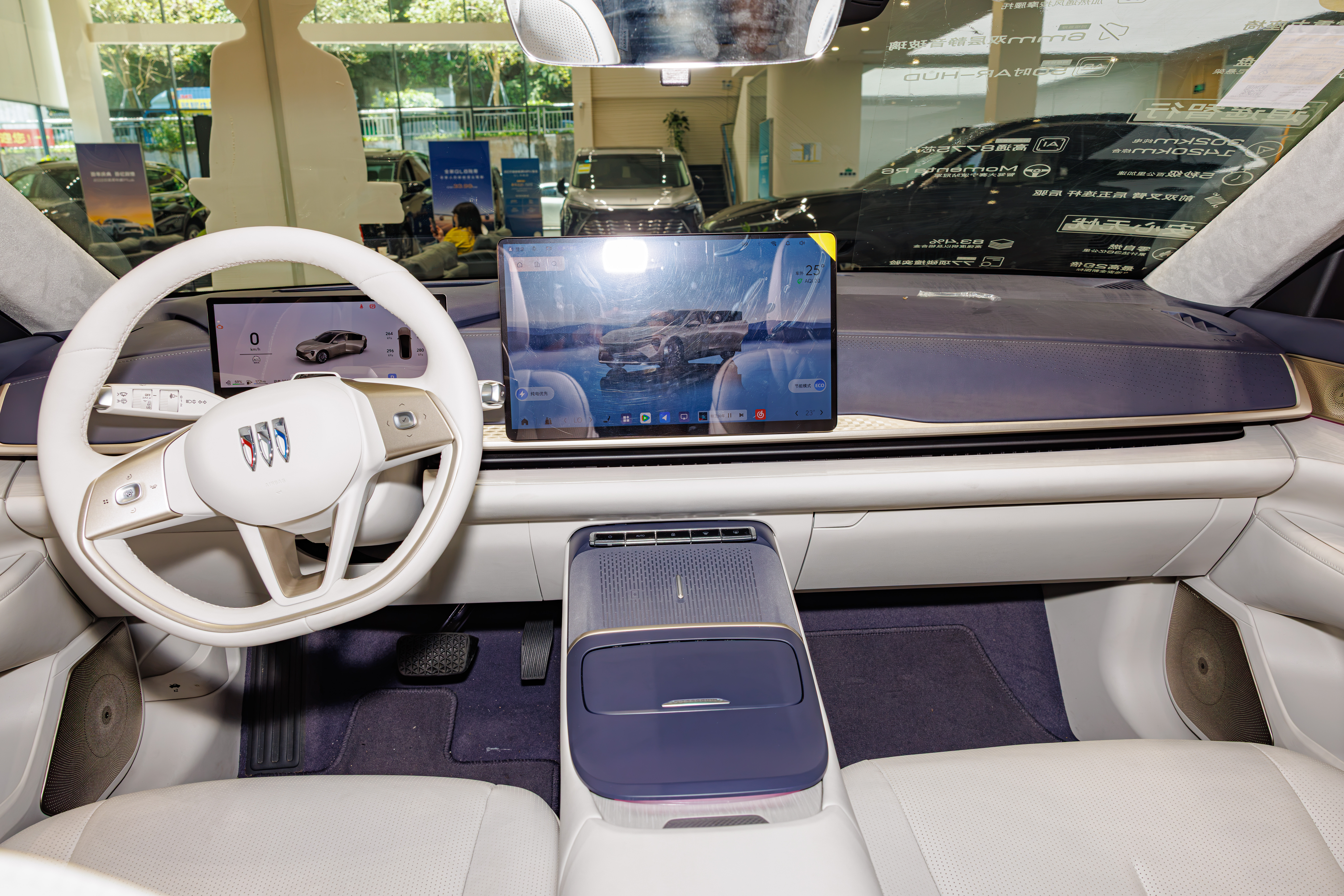
Interior

When the Electra sub-brand and Xiao Yao platform were first announced on 21 April 2025 at Auto Shanghai, one of the first models shown was an Electra sedan concept car alongside the Encasa minivan concept. The sedan concept would later become the L7.

The Electra L7 is a full-size sedan using an extended range powertrain. It is a Chinese market exclusive vehicle that is expected to begin deliveries in Q4 2025. A battery electric version will also be available in the near future.

=== Design and features ===
As with the other models that were announced alongside Electra sub-brand and the Xiao Yao platform, the L7 uses a shark nose-like front end with heavily stylized headlights. The L7 also adopts a fastback shape.

The L7's infotainment system is powered by a Qualcomm Snapdragon 8775 SoC capable of 72 TOPS of inference.

The L7 is equipped with an ADAS suite provided by Momenta, which utilizes a roof-mounted LiDAR sensor and is powered by a Qualcomm Snapdragon 8775 capable of 72 TOPS. Additionally, the car is equipped with turquoise autonomous driving indicator lights on the exterior.

== Powertrain ==
The L7 is available with a range extended electric powertrain, where the engine is not mechanically connected to the wheels and only serves as a generator. The standard rear-wheel-drive variant uses a 338 hp (252 kW; 343 PS) rear motor, while all-wheel drive variants add a 164 hp (122 kW; 166 PS) front motor for a total of 502 hp (374 kW; 509 PS); both use a 1.5-liter turbocharged inline-4 petrol engine making 154 hp (115 kW; 156 PS). Power is supplied by a 40.2 kWh Ultium battery pack with LFP cells made by Jiangsu-based Zenergy and assembled by SAIC Power.

== Sales ==
Year	China
2025	8,679
