= Opel Astra =

Compact car

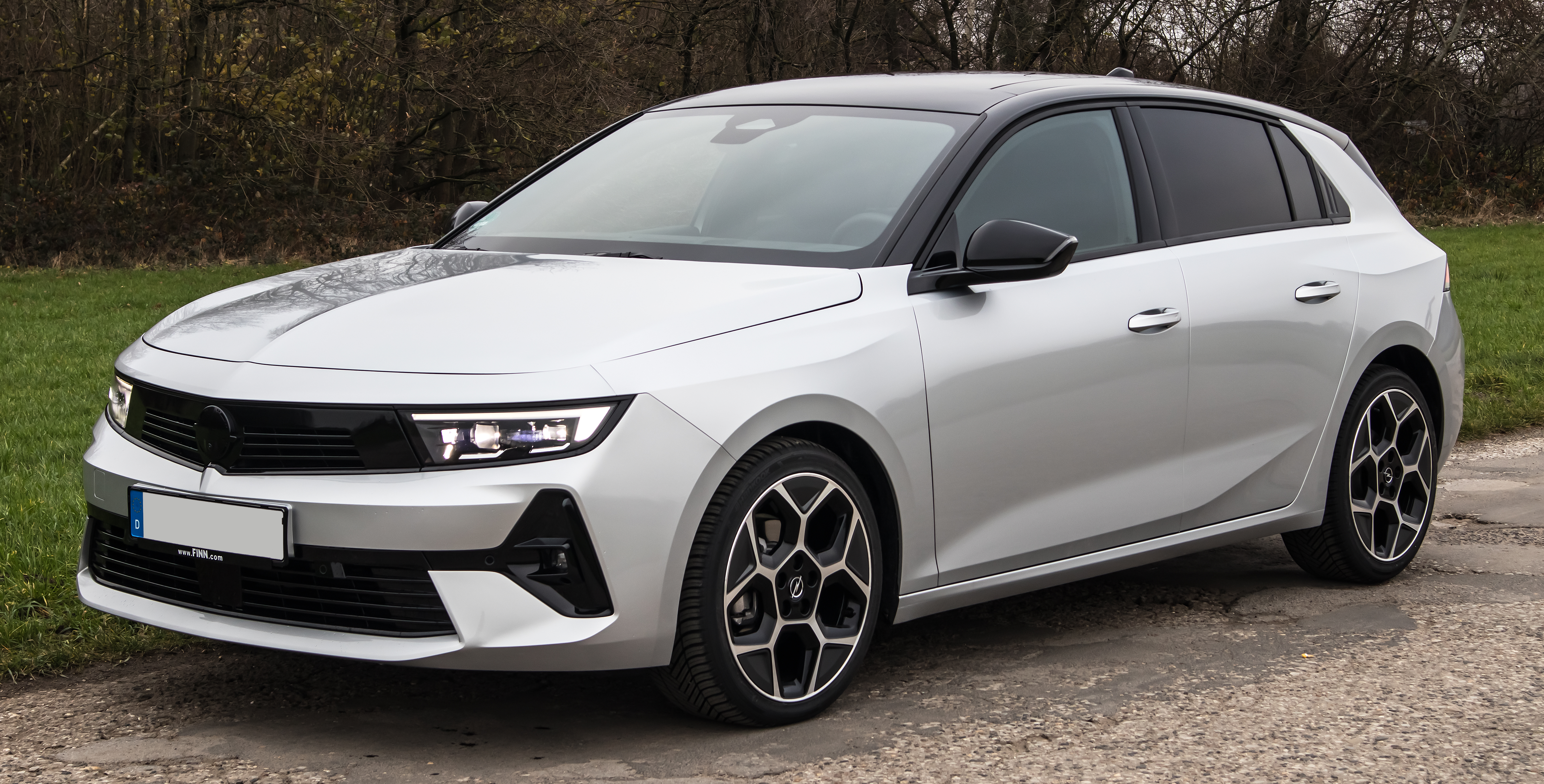

Overview
- Manufacturer: Opel (Note: General Motors (1992–2017); PSA Group (2017–2021); Stellantis (2021–present))
- Also called: Chevrolet Astra (Latin America); Holden Astra (Australia and New Zealand); Saturn Astra (North America); Vauxhall Astra (United Kingdom)
- Production: 1991–present

Body and chassis
- Class: Compact car/small family car (C)
- Layout: Front-engine, front-wheel drive

Chronology
- Predecessor: Opel Kadett; Vauxhall Astra
- Successor: Chevrolet/Holden Cruze (for Chevrolet, Saturn and Holden Astra); Chevrolet Cobalt (South America); Opel Combo (for Opel Astravan H); Opel/Vauxhall/Buick/Holden Cascada (for Opel Astra HTwinTop)

The Opel Astra is a compact car/small family car (C-segment) developed and produced by the German automaker Opel since 1991, currently at its sixth generation. It was first launched in September 1991 as a direct replacement to the Opel Kadett. As of 2025, the car sits above the smaller Corsa supermini.

== Overview ==
Initially, the Astra was available in hatchback, saloon, and estate (station wagon; known as the Astra Caravan, later the Sports Tourer) forms. A panel van (sedan delivery; Astravan) and a convertible (Astra Cabrio) also appeared in the early 1990s. These body styles were later followed by a coupé (the Astra GTC) in 2004, and the sporty Astra OPC appeared in 2005. The Twin Top retractable hardtop convertible replaced the soft top convertible in 2006, while the Caravan was renamed to Astra Sports Tourer since 2009.

The Astra is branded the Vauxhall Astra in the United Kingdom. It was rebadged and sold as the Saturn Astra in North America between 2008 and 2009, as the Buick Excelle XT from 2009 until 2015 and as the Buick Verano/Hatchback GS in China from 2015 until 2021. The Holden Astra was discontinued in Australia and New Zealand in 2009, and was replaced by the locally assembled Holden Cruze. It briefly returned to the Australian market in 2012, for the first time badged as an Opel, but was discontinued after Opel withdrew from the country a year later. In 2015, Opel reintroduced the Astra GTC and Astra VXR to Australia and New Zealand in 2015, again bearing the Holden badge. Between 2017 and 2019, the Astra nameplate was also used for the Holden version of the Cruze sedan.

After Opel was sold by General Motors to PSA Group, the Astra K continued to be produced under license until it was replaced by the Astra L. The Astra L was released after the merger of the company to form Stellantis.

The Astra nameplate originates from Vauxhall, which had manufactured and marketed earlier generations of the Opel Kadett (the Kadett D and Kadett E) as the Vauxhall Astra since March 1980. Subsequent GM Europe policy standardised model nomenclature in the early 1990s, whereby model names were the same in all markets regardless of the marque they were sold under.

As of 2021, there have been six generations of the Astra (or eleven generations of the Kadett/Astra family as a whole). In a fashion typical for Opel, they are designated with subsequent letters of the Latin alphabet. Opel's official convention is that the Astra is a logical continuation of the Kadett lineage, thus, the first generation of Opel Astra became the Astra F rather than the Astra A since the final Opel Kadett was the Kadett E. The Mk1 and Mk2 Vauxhall Astras are sometimes called the Astra D and Astra E by enthusiasts to mark the continuity with their sister models.

Models sold as Vauxhall, Holden, or Chevrolet have different generation designations reflecting the history of those nameplates in their home markets and their naming conventions.

== First generation (Astra F – T91; 1991) ==
First generation (Astra F)
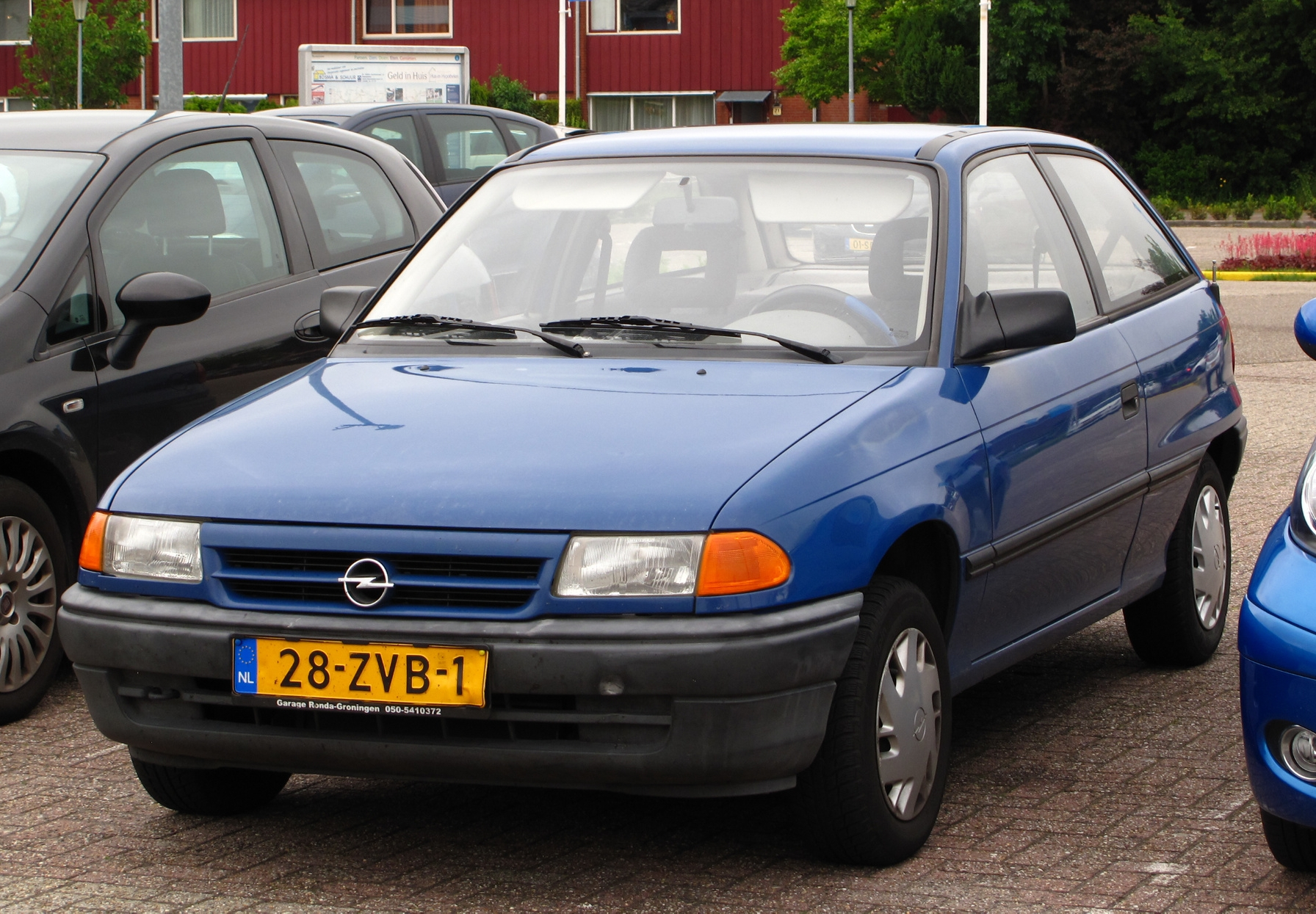
- Opel Astra 3-door hatchback (pre-facelift)

Overview
- Model code: T91
- Also called: Vauxhall Astra (United Kingdom); Holden Astra (Australia and New Zealand); Chevrolet Astra; Opel Optima (Indonesia); Opel Kadett (South Africa)
- Production: June 1991 – 2003
- Assembly: Belgium: Antwerp (1991-1998); Germany: Bochum (1991-1998); Germany: Eisenach (1991-1998); United Kingdom: Ellesmere Port (Vauxhall Ellesmere Port, 1992-1998); Hungary: Szentgotthárd; India: Halol (OIPL); Indonesia: Bekasi (GMBI); Italy: Grugliasco (Bertone); Poland: Gliwice; South Africa: Port Elizabeth (Delta Motor); Taiwan: Xinzhuang District (CAC); Thailand: Rayong (GM Thailand); Turkey: Torbalı, İzmir Province (1992-1998)
- Designer: Hans Seer

Body and chassis
- Body style: 3 and 5-door hatchback 4-door sedan / saloon 5-door wagon / estate 2-door convertible 3-door sedan delivery (panel van)
- Layout: Front engine, front wheel drive
- Platform: T-body platform

Powertrain
- Engine: Petrol: 1.4 L Family 1 I4; 1.6 L Family 1 I4; 1.8 L Family II I4; 2.0 L Family II I4; 2.0 L Family II turbo I4 (ZA); Diesel: 1.7 L Family II I4; 1.7 L Isuzu 4EE1 I4
- Transmission: 5-speed manual 6-speed manual 4-speed automatic

Dimensions
- Wheelbase: 2,517 mm (99.1 in)
- Length: Hatch: 4,050 mm (159.4 in); Sedan: 4,239 mm (166.9 in); Wagon: 4,278 mm (168.4 in); Convertible: 4,239 mm (166.9 in)
- Width: 1,696 mm (66.8 in)
- Height: 1,410 mm (55.5 in)

The Astra F debuted in September 1991. With the Kadett E's successor, Opel adopted the Astra nameplate, which was already used by Vauxhall for the Kadett D and E (see Vauxhall Astra). It was offered as a three- or five-door hatchback, a saloon (sedan), and an estate (wagon) known as the Caravan and available with five doors only, bringing Opel's run of three-door wagons to an end at long last. The Caravan appeared in October 1991, immediately after the original introduction, as did the sporty, 16-valve GSI model with its aggressive bodykit. A cabriolet was also offered, designed, and built by Bertone in Italy.

Compared to the Kadett, the Astra grew slightly in all dimensions except the wheelbase. The windshield was moved forward by 7.5 cm (3 in) while the roof was extended the same amount at the rear, meaning a significant increase in interior volume.

The Astra F received a cosmetic facelift in 1994, accompanied by improved rust protection. This included a new grille with a larger Opel badge, clear front turn signals, new door mirrors (replacing the earlier Kadett E units used on the pre-facelift model), and a generally smoothed-out appearance. While the Astra F finished production in Germany in 2000, Polish-built Astras remained on offer in Central and Eastern Europe, as well as Turkey, India and Asia with the name Opel Astra Classic from 1999 to 2003.

The Astra F consisted of two main revisions and was revised in 1995, with the launch of Opel's new Ecotec engine.

Aside from the South Africa-only 200tS, the lead model was the GSi – a 2.0-litre 16V fuel injected model with 150 PS (110 kW), available as a three-door only. It also featured a sports body kit and widened front seats in the interior. However, this was substituted in 1995 and was renamed as SPORT, although only a limited number were produced and the body kit was removed also and it could be selected with the lower-powered, but more modern 'Ecotec' version, the 136 PS (100 kW; 134 bhp) X20XEV parallel with the C20XE. In Europe from 1994 all Astra models were offered with the 2.0 L 16V Ecotec X20XEV parallel with the eight-valve C20NE engine, but the three-door and station wagon models could be selected with the 150 PS (110 kW; 148 bhp) C20XE engine.

After the Astra F was replaced by the new generation Astra G in 1998, the so-called "REDTOP" C20XE engine was also taken out of production.

=== Gallery ===
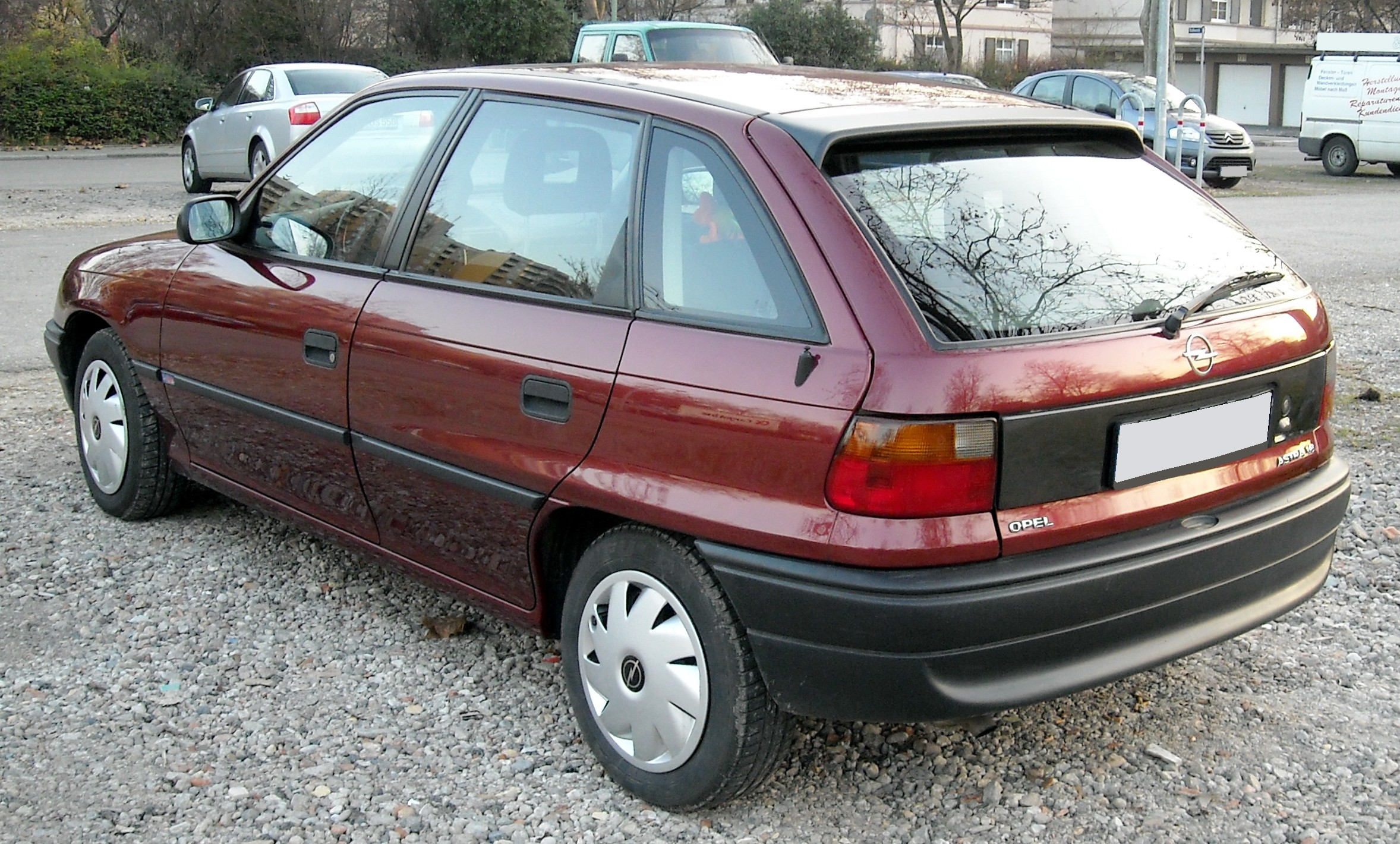
Hatchback (facelift version)

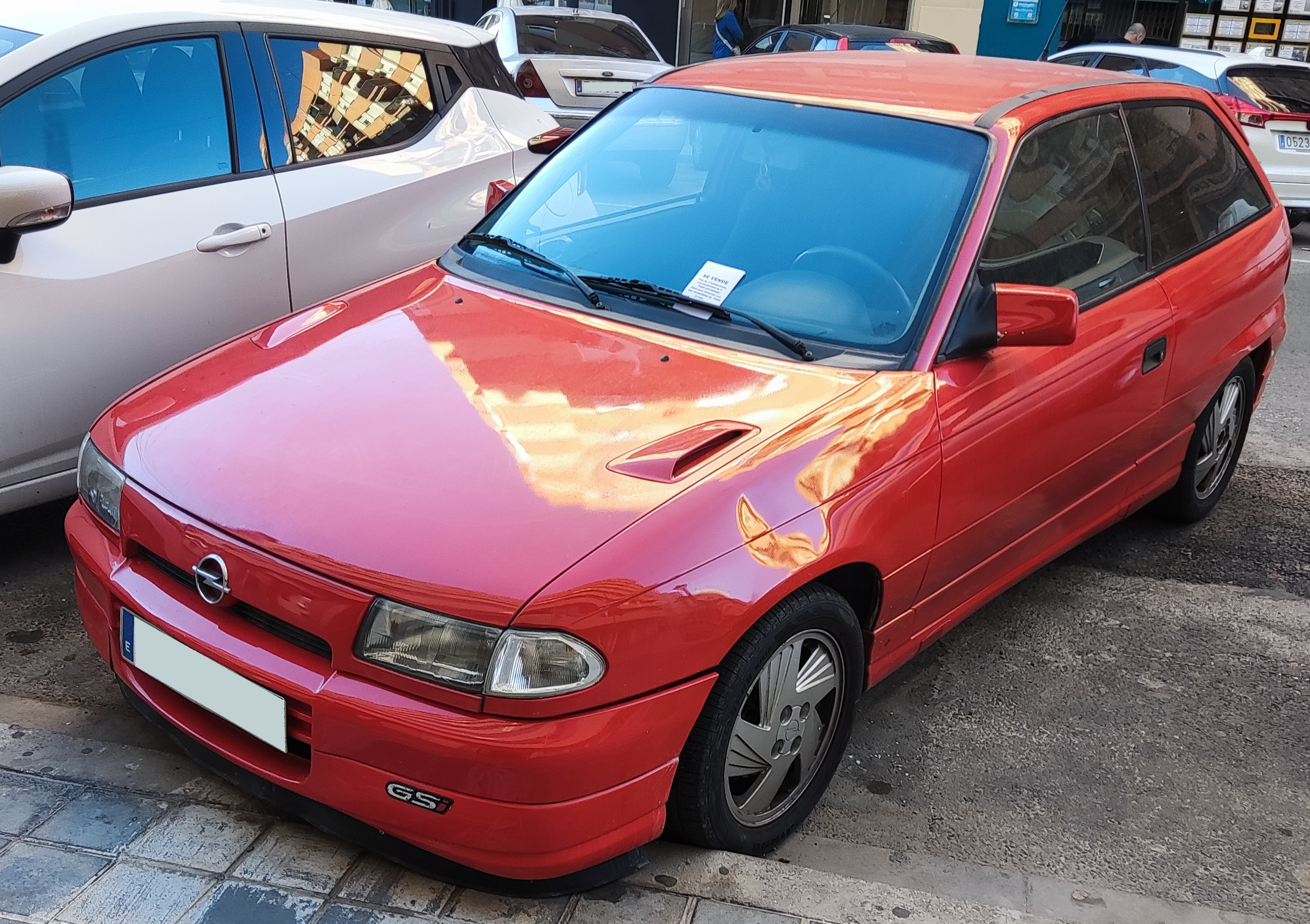
The Astra GSi received a bodykit and alloy wheels

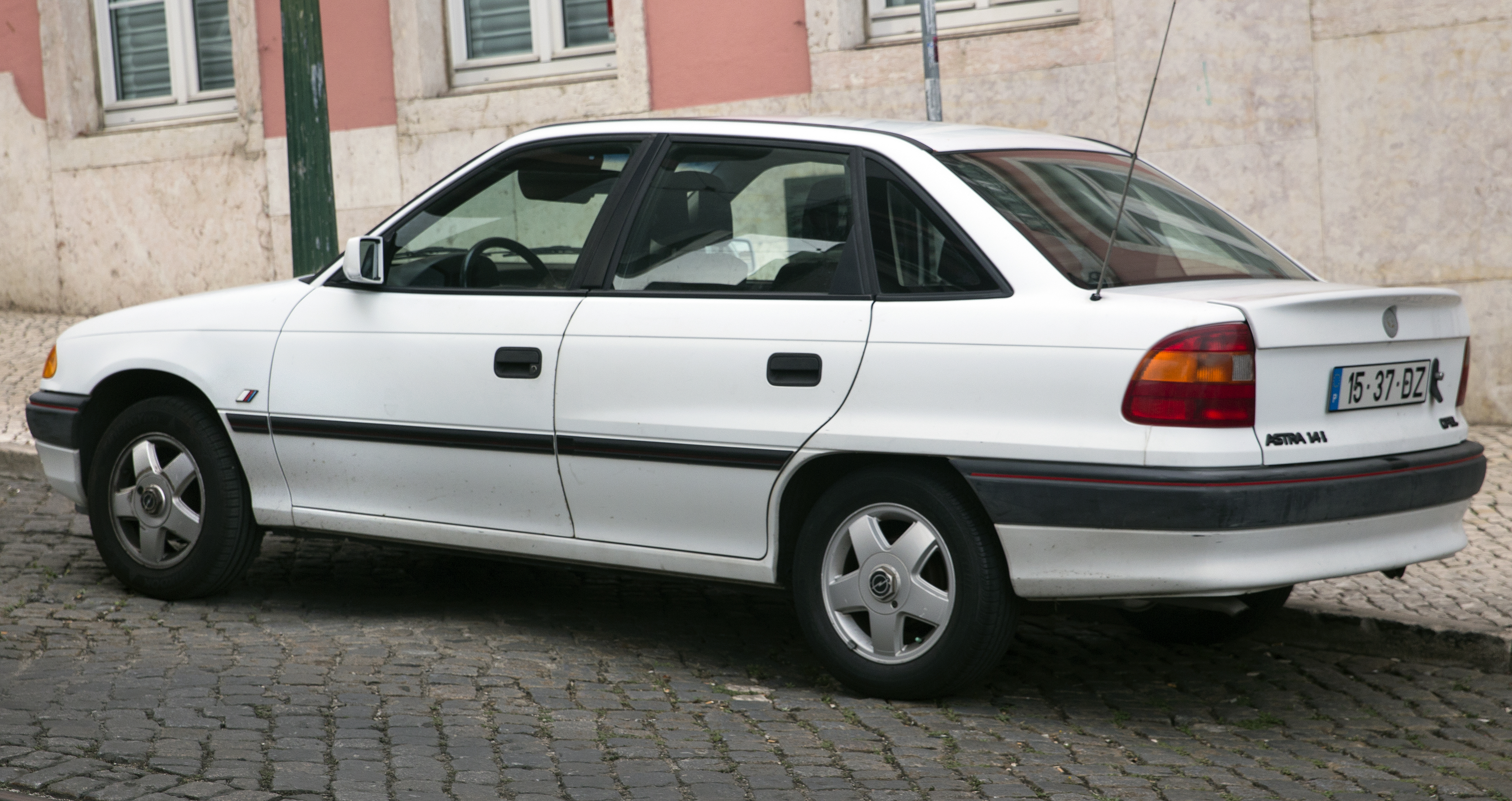
Sedan (pre-facelift)

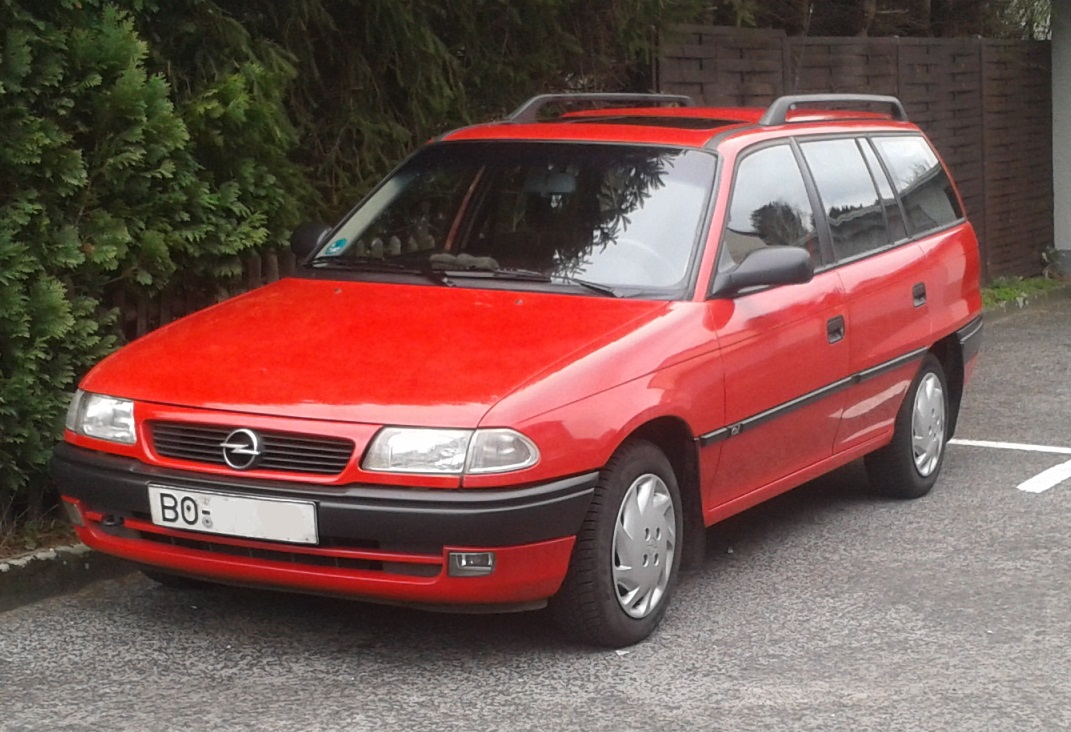
Facelift version (Caravan)

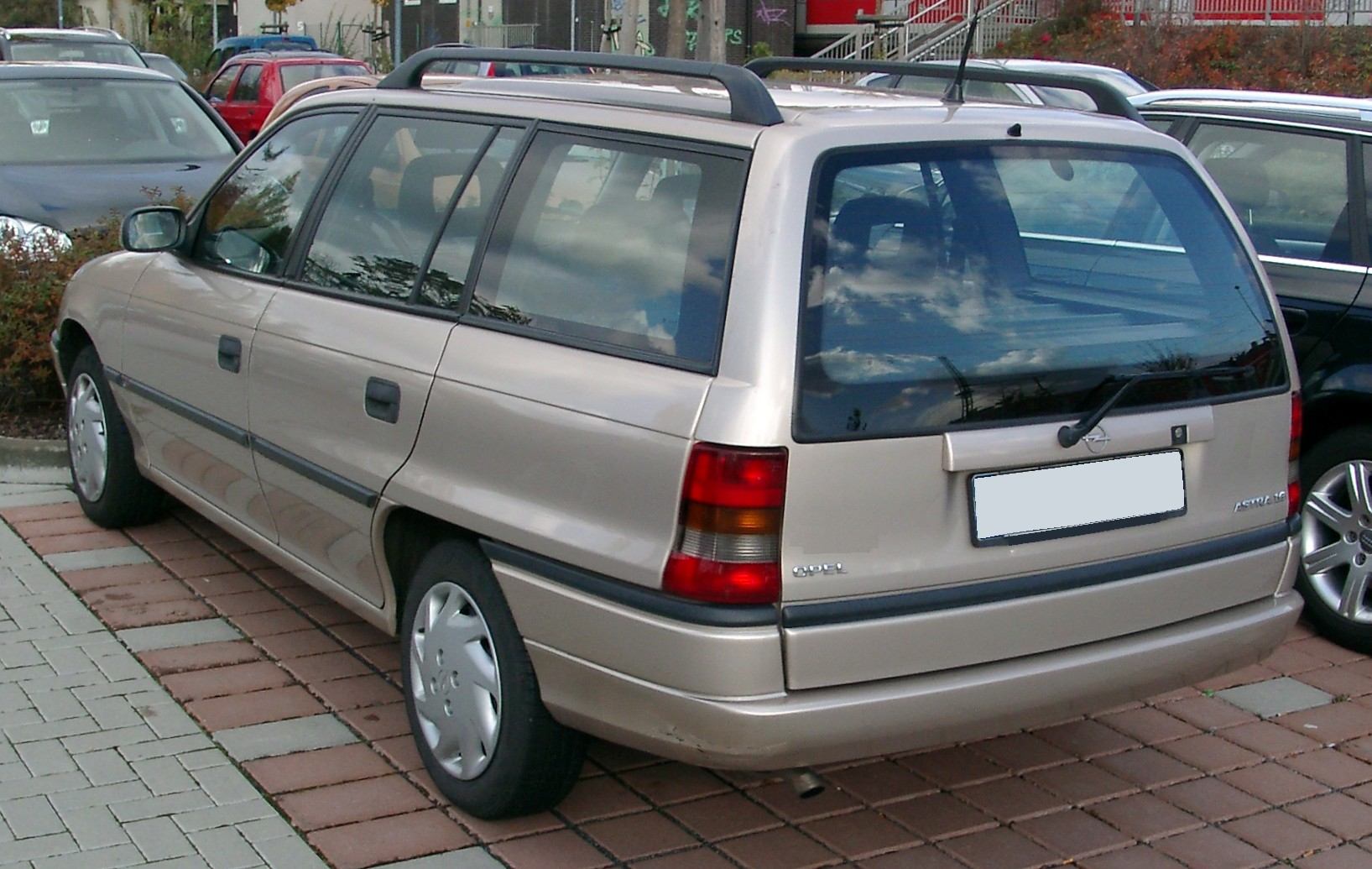
Caravan (facelift)

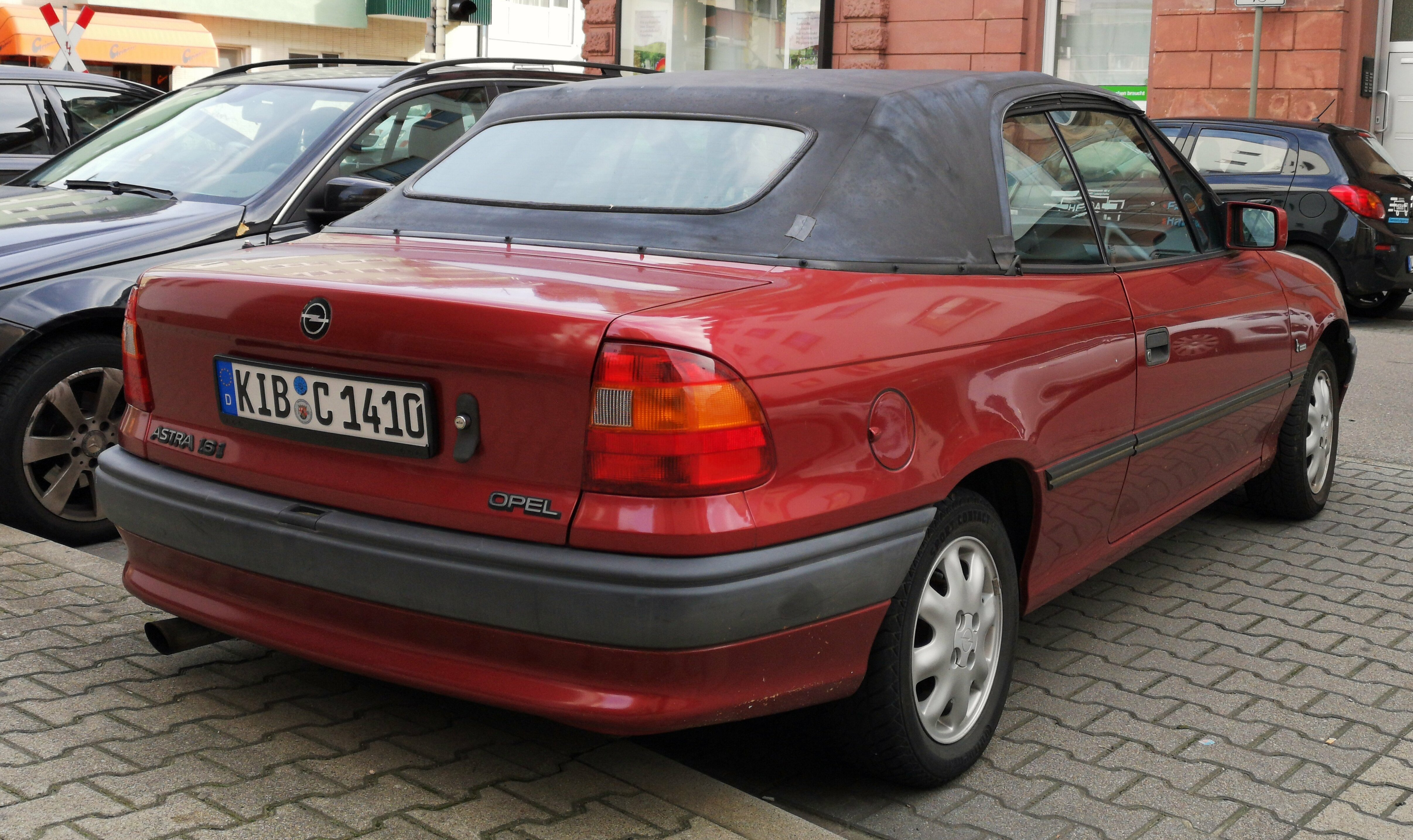
Cabriolet

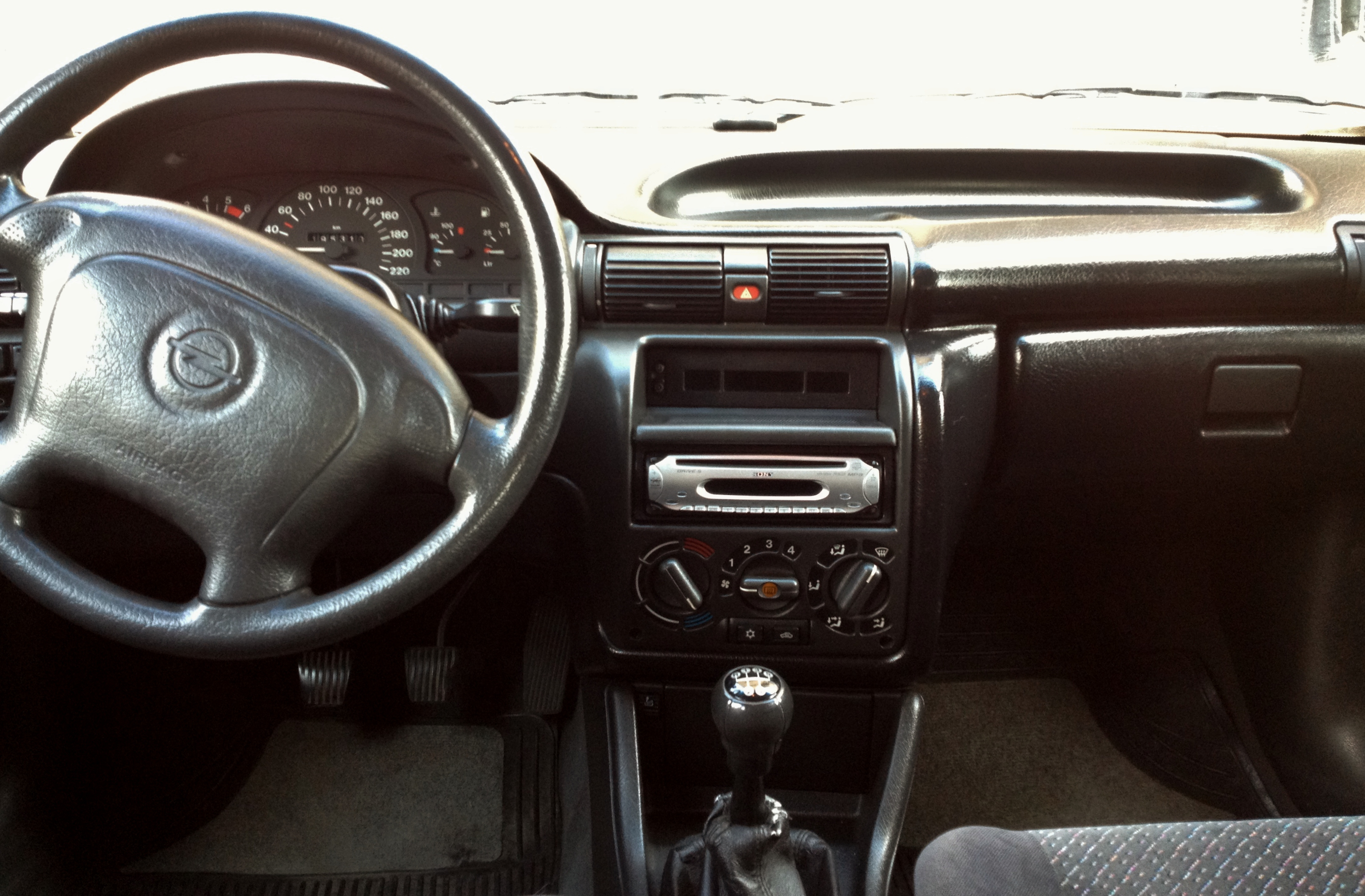
Interior (facelift)

=== South African models ===
The model was also launched in South Africa in November 1991, where it was produced under licence by Delta. The "Kadett" name was retained for the hatchback Astras until 2000. The sedan and station wagon models were offered under the Astra name. The Kadett and Astra in South Africa won the title of 'Car of the Year' in two consecutive years (1994 and 1995) even though they were versions of the same car. South African nomenclature was denoted in centilitres, so the Astra and Kadett ranges featured 140, 160i, 180i and 200i models. Models with fuel injection received the "i" designation, while carburetor models didn't. Additional model designation was listed after the displacement with the inclusion of the letters "S" for sport or "E" for executive. Sport trim was typically for the Kadett (hatchback) model and included a different front bumper with spotlights and a rear spoiler. Executive derivatives included a higher specification level than non-executive models. The top variant in the Kadett (hatchback) model was the 200iS which featured a 2.0 SOHC 8v engine producing 95kw while the top spec Astra (sedan) derivative featured a 2.0 16v DOHC engine producing 110kw. The South African lineup also included a unique limited edition variant with a turbocharged C20LET engine called the 200tS offered in either Kadett (hatchback) or Astra (sedan) derivatives and was only available for two model years (1994-1995) and in limited numbers. The 200tS was built by Delta Motor Corporation and faster than the then-current BMW M3 in a quarter-mile drag race. The "t" stands for the turbocharger. The engine was sourced from the 4x4 Opel Calibra and Opel Vectra and converted from a six-speed, four-wheel drive transmission (Getrag F28) to front-wheel drive only with a limited-slip differential. The 200tS was unique from other Kadett and Astra models as it used a 5-bolt wheel hub (all other cars used a 4-bolt hub), it also featured 16-inch alloy wheels same as were on Vectra Turbo and Calibra Turbo.

=== Other markets ===
The Opel Astra also became available in Australasia badged as a Holden, first in New Zealand in 1995, and then Australia in 1996. These models were imported from the UK. The Holden Astra name had previously been used on rebadged Nissan Pulsar models from 1984 to 1989.

The Opel Astra's first generation was exported to Brazil from December 1994 as the Chevrolet Astra, possibly because of a lowering of import tariffs. General Motors do Brasil sent the 2.0-litre, 115 bhp engines to Belgium, whence the completed cars took their way to Brazil. In February 1996 the Brazilian government again changed the import tariff, from 20 to 70% - making the car prohibitively expensive and leading to its cancellation after just over a year on the market. Instead, the locally built Kadett was updated. The second-generation Astra was manufactured in Brazil.

Beginning in March 1995, the Astra sedan was assembled in Indonesia where it was marketed as the Opel Optima. The renaming was done as the global name was already used by Astra International, a local automotive company and an assembler/distributor of several competing car brands. In India the Opel Astra was assembled for the local market in a joint venture with the Birla Companies, beginning in 1996. Indian production ended in 2002.

The first-generation Chevrolet Astra in Brazil had a Vauxhall-style front grille featuring a "V", containing the Chevrolet badge.

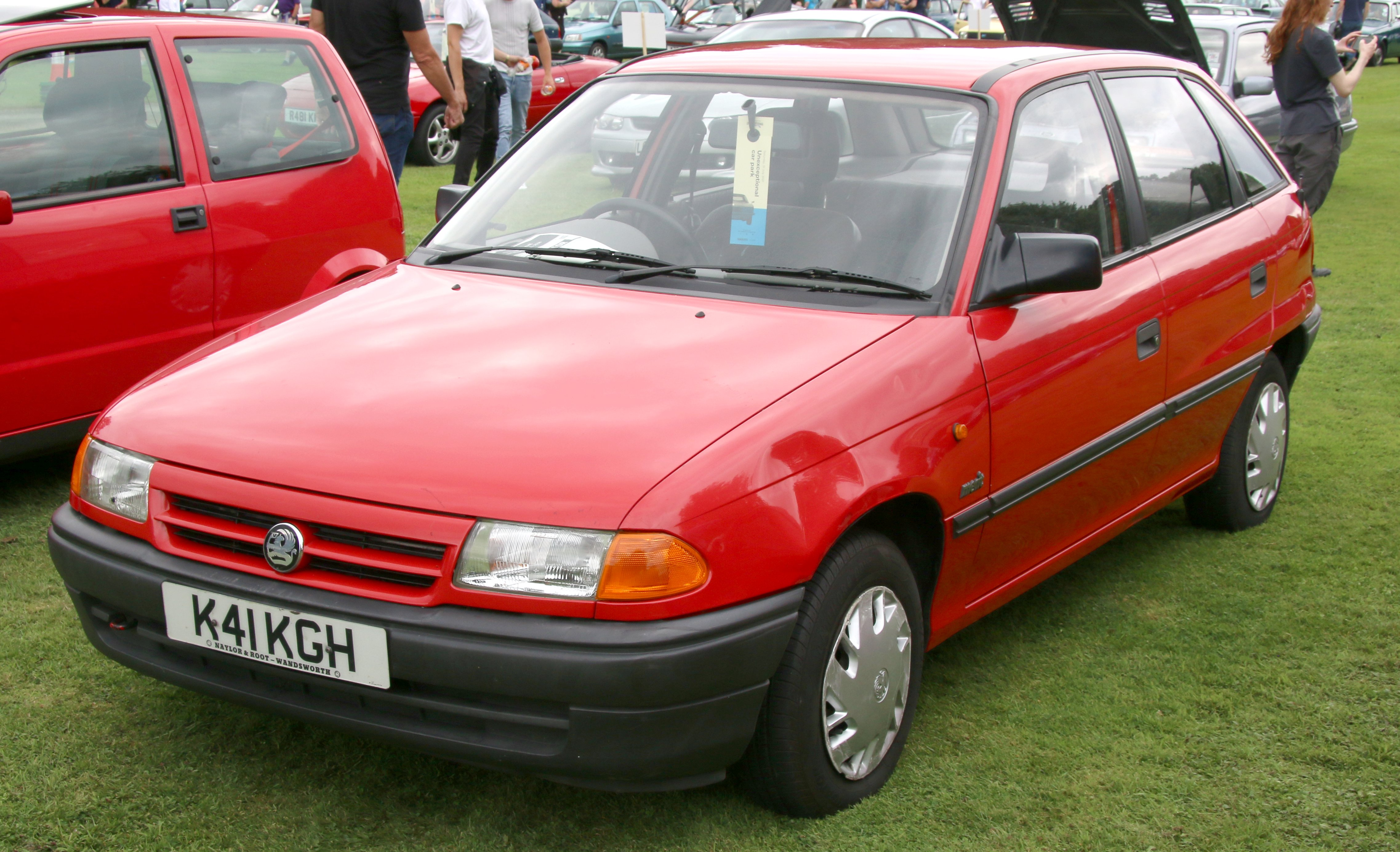
Vauxhall Astra Mk 3 (United Kingdom; pre-facelift)

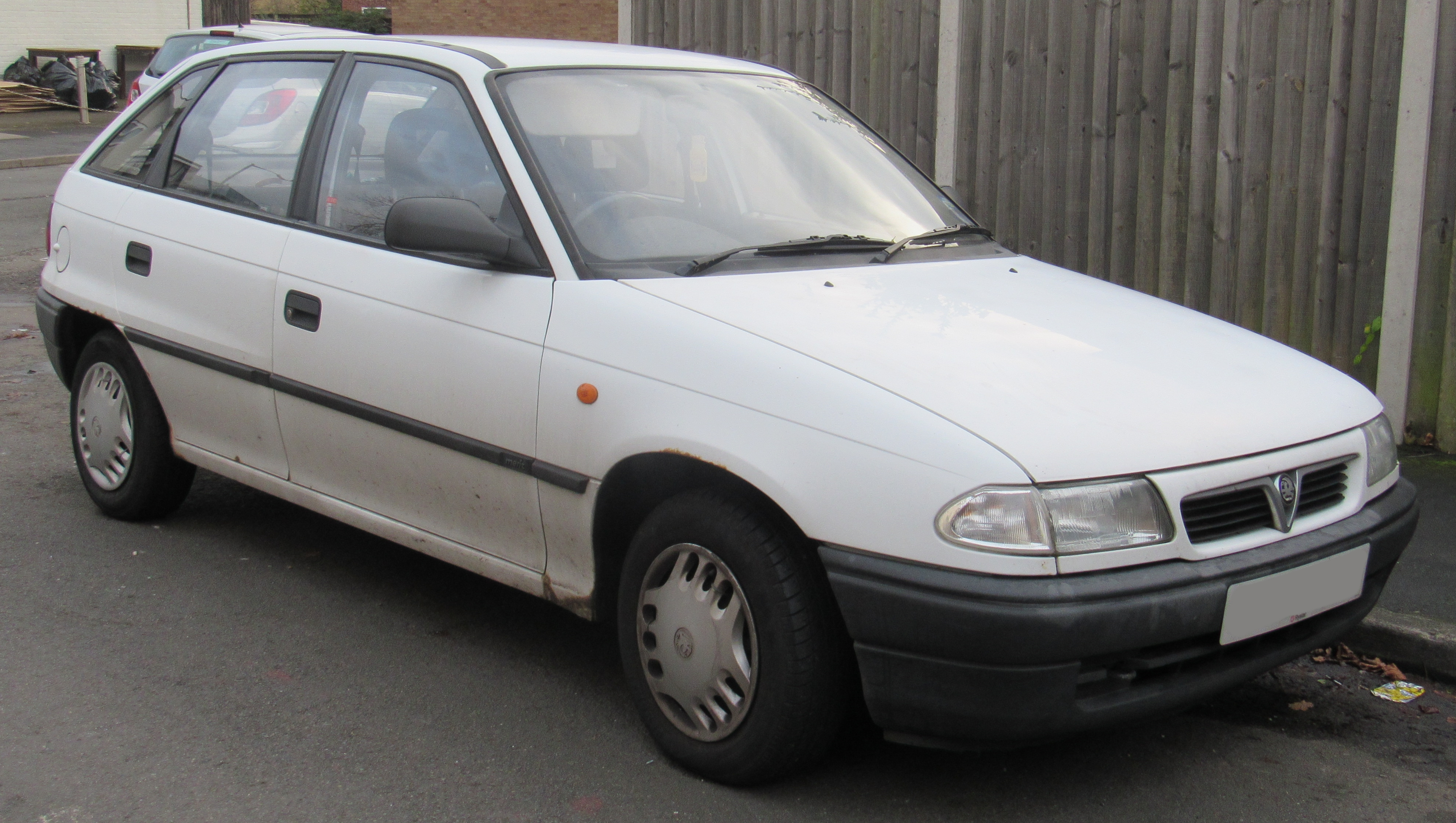
Vauxhall Astra Mk 3 (United Kingdom; facelift)

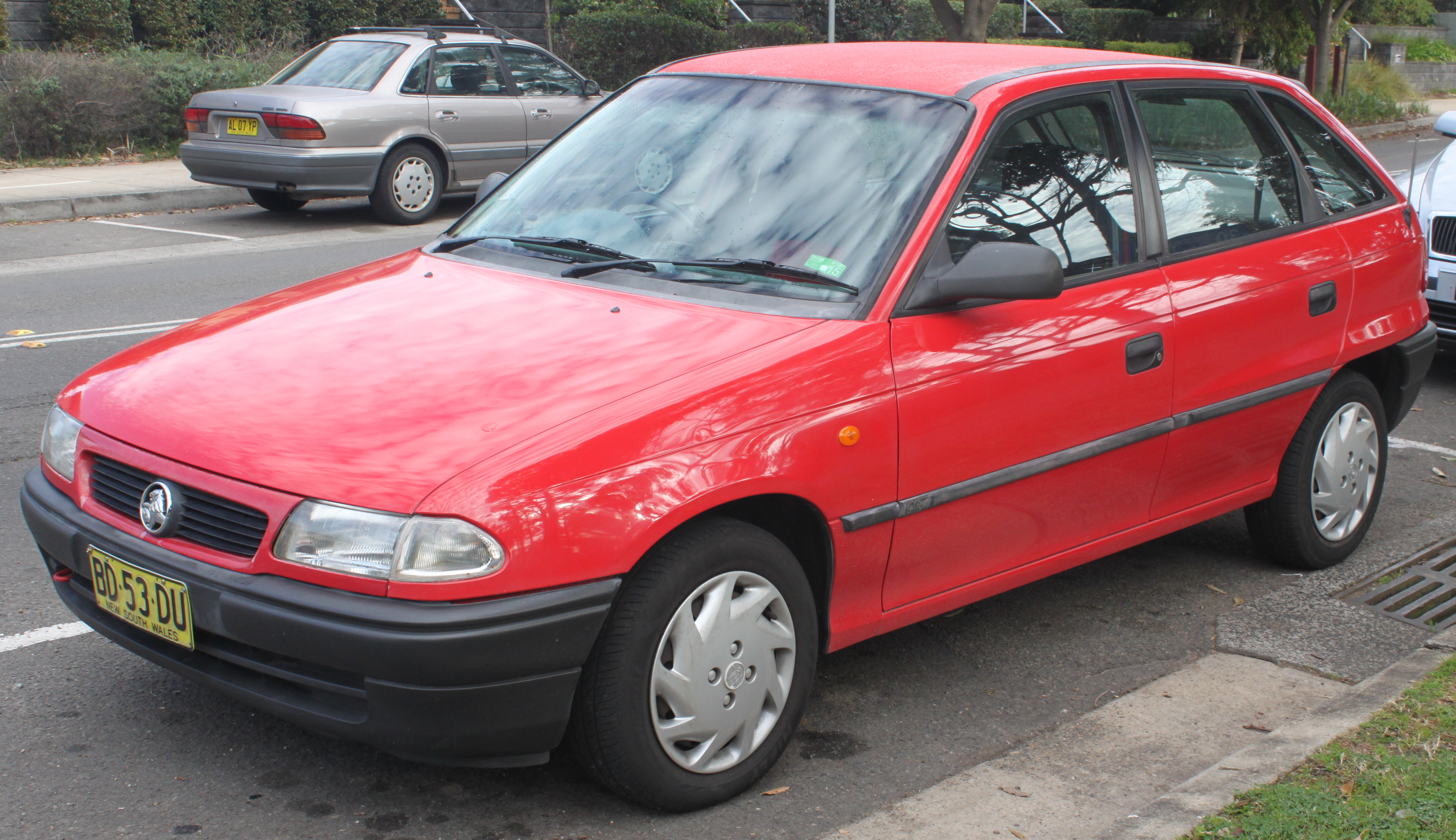
Holden Astra TR (Australia and New Zealand)

=== Awards ===
- 1992 – Semperit Irish Car of the Year
- 1994 and 1995 – South African Car of the Year

=== Engines ===
Petrol engines
Engine code	Engine	Displacement	Power	Torque	Fueling system	Valvetrain	Compression ratio
140I	Inline-four	1389 cc	60 PS (44 kW; 59 hp)	103 N⋅m (76 lb⋅ft)	Multi-point fuel injection	SOHC	9.4:1
140IE	Inline-four	1398 cc	75 PS (55 kW; 74 hp)	110 N⋅m (81 lb⋅ft)	Carburetor	SOHC	9.4:1
140IS	Inline-four	1398 cc	82 PS (60 kW; 81 hp)	115 N⋅m (85 lb⋅ft)	Multi-point fuel injection	SOHC	9.8:1
C14NZ	Inline-four	1389 cc	60 PS (44 kW; 59 hp)	103 N⋅m (76 lb⋅ft)	Single-point fuel injection	SOHC	9.4:1
C14SE	Inline-four	1389 cc	82 PS (60 kW; 81 hp)	113 N⋅m (83 lb⋅ft)	Multi-point fuel injection	SOHC	10.0:1
X14NZ	Inline-four	1389 cc	60 PS (44 kW; 59 hp)	103 N⋅m (76 lb⋅ft)	Single-point fuel injection	SOHC	9.4:1
X14XE (Ecotec)	Inline-four	1389 cc	90 PS (66 kW; 89 hp)	125 N⋅m (92 lb⋅ft)	Multi-point fuel injection	DOHC	10.5:1
C16NZ and X16SZR	Inline-four	1598 cc	75 PS (55 kW; 74 hp)	125 N⋅m (92 lb⋅ft)	Single-point fuel injection	SOHC	9.2:1
C16SE	Inline-four	1598 cc	100 PS (74 kW; 99 hp)	135 N⋅m (100 lb⋅ft)	Multi-point fuel injection	SOHC	9.8:1
X16SZ	Inline-four	1598 cc	71 PS (52 kW; 70 hp)	128 N⋅m (94 lb⋅ft)	Single-point fuel injection	SOHC	10.0:1
X16XZR	Inline-four	1598 cc	71 PS (52 kW; 70 hp)	128 N⋅m (94 lb⋅ft)	Single-point fuel injection	SOHC	9.6:1
X16XEL (Ecotec)	Inline-four	1598 cc	101 PS (74 kW; 100 hp)	148 N⋅m (109 lb⋅ft)	Multi-point fuel injection	DOHC	10.5:1
C18NZ	Inline-four	1796 cc	90 PS (66 kW; 89 hp)	145 N⋅m (107 lb⋅ft)	Single-point fuel injection	SOHC	9.2:1
C18XE	Inline-four	1794 cc	125 PS (92 kW; 123 hp)	168 N⋅m (124 lb⋅ft)	Multi-point fuel injection	DOHC	10.8:1
C18SEL (Ecotec)	Inline-four	1798 cc	115 PS (85 kW; 113 hp)	168 N⋅m (124 lb⋅ft)	Multi-point fuel injection	DOHC	9.9:1
C18XEL (Ecotec)	Inline-four	1798 cc	115 PS (85 kW; 113 hp)	168 N⋅m (124 lb⋅ft)	Multi-point fuel injection	DOHC	10.8:1
X18XE (Ecotec)	Inline-four	1794 cc	115 PS (85 kW; 113 hp)	170 N⋅m (125 lb⋅ft)	Multi-point fuel injection	DOHC	10.8:1
20SEH (South Africa)	Inline-four	1998 cc	130 PS (96 kW; 128 hp)	180 N⋅m (133 lb⋅ft)	Multi-point fuel injection	SOHC	9.8:1
20XE-LN (South Africa)	Inline-four	1998 cc	156 PS (115 kW; 154 hp)	200 N⋅m (148 lb⋅ft)	Multi-point fuel injection	DOHC	9.8:1
C20NE	Inline-four	1998 cc	115 PS (85 kW; 113 hp)	170 N⋅m (125 lb⋅ft)	Multi-point fuel injection	SOHC	9.2:1
X20XEV (Ecotec)	Inline-four	1998 cc	136 PS (100 kW; 134 hp)	185 N⋅m (136 lb⋅ft)	Multi-point fuel injection	DOHC	10.8:1
C20XE	Inline-four	1998 cc	150 PS (110 kW; 148 hp)	196 N⋅m (145 lb⋅ft)	Multi-point fuel injection	DOHC	10.5:1
C20LET (South Africa)	Inline-four	1998 cc	204 PS (150 kW; 201 hp)	280 N⋅m (207 lb⋅ft)	Multi-point fuel injection, turbocharger	DOHC	8.5:1

Diesel engines
Engine code	Engine	Displacement	Power	Torque	Fueling system	Valvetrain	Compression ratio
17D	Inline-four	1699 cc	57 PS (42 kW; 56 hp)	105 N⋅m (77 lb⋅ft)	Bosch injection pump	SOHC	23:1
17DR	Inline-four	1699 cc	60 PS (44 kW; 59 hp)	105 N⋅m (77 lb⋅ft)	Bosch injection pump	SOHC	23:1
X17DTL	Inline-four	1700 cc	68 PS (50 kW; 67 hp)	132 N⋅m (97 lb⋅ft)	Bosch injection pump	SOHC	22:1
X17DT	Inline-four	1686 cc	82 PS (60 kW; 81 hp)	168 N⋅m (124 lb⋅ft)	Bosch injection pump	SOHC	22:1

Electric engines
Engine code	Engine	Accumulator capacity	Power	Torque	Accumulator type
Impuls 2	Electric	80 km	60 PS (44 kW; 59 hp)	N/A	NiCd
Impuls 3	Electric	140 km	57 PS (42 kW; 56 hp)	N/A	NaNiCl

== Second generation (Astra G – T98; 1998) ==
Second generation (Astra G)
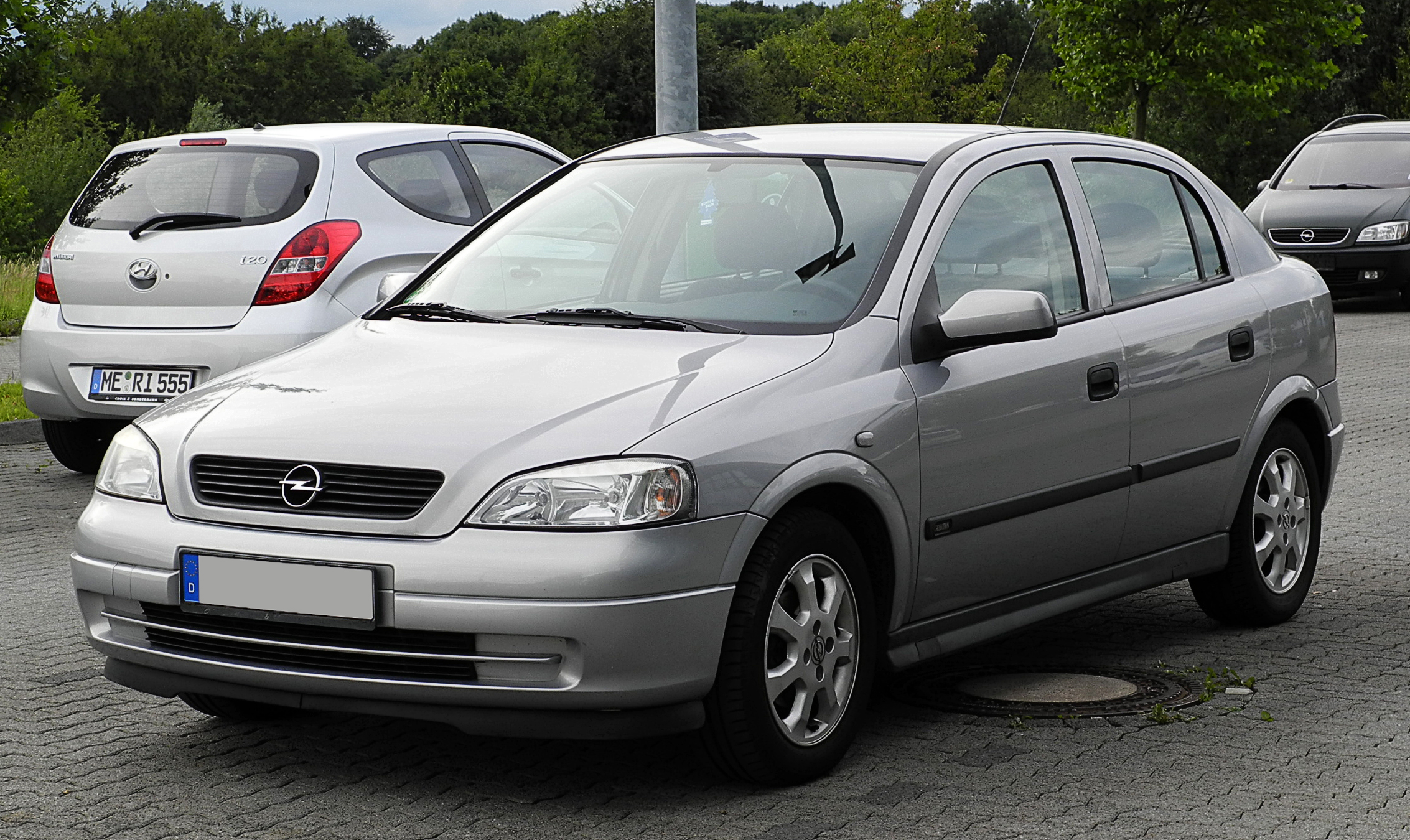
- Opel Astra G Hatchback 5-door (facelift; front)

Overview
- Model code: T98
- Also called: Vauxhall Astra (United Kingdom); Holden Astra (Australia and New Zealand); Chevrolet Astra; Chevrolet Viva (Russia)
- Production: 1998–2009 (Opel); 1998–2011 (Chevrolet); September 1999 – May 2004 (Ireland)
- Assembly: Belgium: Antwerp (1998-2004); Brazil: São Caetano do Sul (GM do Brasil); Egypt: 6th of October City (GME); Germany: Bochum (1998-2004); Italy: Grugliasco (Bertone, 2001-2004); Poland: Gliwice (2004-2010); Russia: Tolyatti (GM-AvtoVAZ); Turkey: Torbalı, İzmir Province (1998-2002); South Africa: Port Elizabeth (Delta Motor); Ukraine: Zaporizhzhia (AvtoZAZ); United Kingdom: Ellesmere Port
- Designer: Hans Seer

Body and chassis
- Class: Small family car (C)
- Body style: 3/5-door hatchback 4-door saloon 5-door estate 2-door cabriolet 2-door coupé 3-door car derived van
- Layout: GM T platform
- Platform: T-body platform
- Related: Opel Zafira A

Powertrain
- Engine: Petrol: 1.2 L X12XE I4; 1.2 L Z12XE I4; 1.4 L X14XE I4; 1.4 L Z14XE I4; 1.6 L X16SZR I4; 1.6 L Z16SE I4; 1.6 L X16XEL DOHC I4; 1.6 L Z16XE DOHC I4; 1.8 L X18XE1 I4; 1.8 L Z18XE I4; 2.0 L X20XEV/X20XER I4; 2.0 L Z20LET turbo I4; 2.2 L Z22SE I4; 2.4 L X24SFD I4 (only Chevrolet Astra); Diesel: 1.7 L TD 8V I4; 1.7 L DTi 16V I4; 1.7 L Di 16V I4; 1.7 CDTi I4; 2.0 L Di 16V I4; 2.0 L DTi 16V I4; 2.2 L DTi 16V I4; CNG: 1.6 L 16V Z16YNG
- Transmission: 5-speed manual 4-speed automatic 5-speed automatic

Dimensions
- Wheelbase: 2,606 mm (102.6 in); Wagon: 2,611 mm (102.8 in)
- Length: Hatch: 4,110 mm (162 in); Saloon: 4,252 mm (167.4 in); Estate: 4,288 mm (168.8 in); Convertible: 4,267 mm (168.0 in)
- Width: 1,709 mm (67.3 in)
- Height: 1,425 mm (56.1 in); Cabriolet: 1,390 mm (54.7 in)

The Astra G was launched in Europe in Spring of 1998. It was available as a three or five-door hatchback, four-door saloon, five-door estate (in Opel tradition, known as a "Caravan") and two special versions from 2000: the Astra Coupé and the Astra Cabrio, both of them designed and built by Bertone. The Astra G saw the introduction of a natural gas-powered engine. Its chassis was tuned by Lotus and formed the base of a 7-seater compact MPV, the Opel Zafira, which was co-developed by Porsche. Approximately 90,000 coupés were produced.

The manufacturing of the Astra saloon and Caravan continued at Opel's Gliwice plant in Poland after the debut of the next-generation Astra H, with the older model being branded as Astra Classic in a similar fashion to its predecessor, catering to the lower end of the market. This car was offered in Central and Eastern Europe, as well as Turkey with the name Astra Classic II from 2004 to the end of 2009. Apart from European markets, these models were also sold in Australia and New Zealand as the Holden Astra Classic, until they were replaced by the Holden Viva (built-in South Korea) in 2006.

The Astra G was built as Chevrolet Astra in Brazil. It was facelifted in 2003 and was sold in Brazil, Argentina, Mexico, and other Latin American markets until 2011. The GM Brazilian 2.0 8V inline-four engine which equips the Astra has the "flex-power" technology, that allows the car to run on both petrol and alcohol fuels, providing 128/140 hp (G/A) at 5200 rpm.

A taxi version of the Brazilian sourced model, powered with petrol 2.0-litre engine was sold in Chile as the Chevy Urban.

In 2004, GM's Russian joint venture GM-AvtoVAZ launched the 4-door version of the Astra G as the Chevrolet Viva. It was sold through Chevrolet dealers in Russia, while Opel dealers were selling the newer Opel Astra H. Sales were poor from the start due to high pricing: the only version launched was equipped with a 1.8L engine with an above-average trim level, placing the Viva's price above the Toyota Corolla. A project costing $340 million was selling less than a thousand cars annually (801 cars in 2007); rumours of shutting down Chevy Viva production circulated as early as summer of 2005. GM-AvtoVAZ shut down small-scale production of the Viva in March 2008.

=== Gallery ===
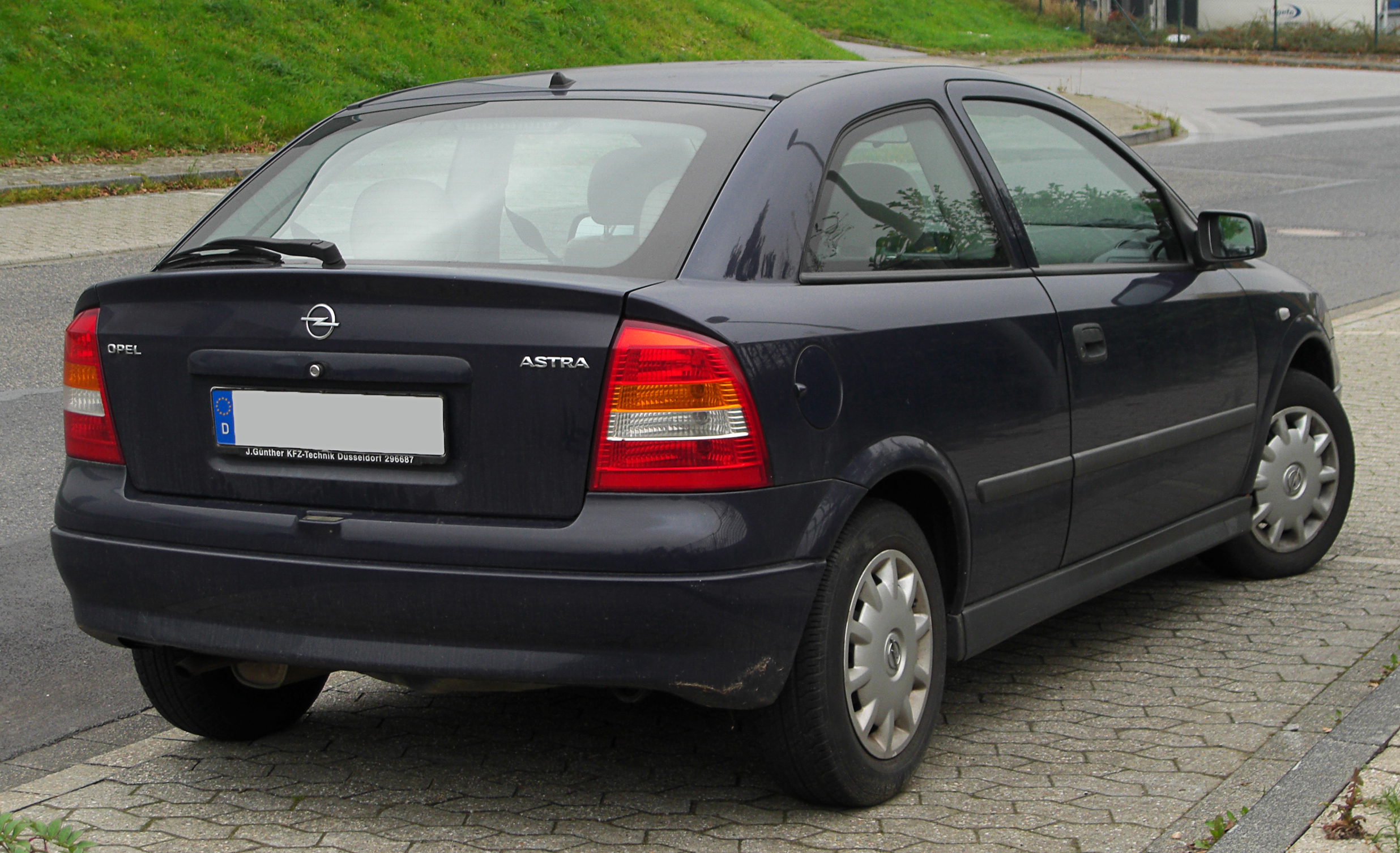
3-door

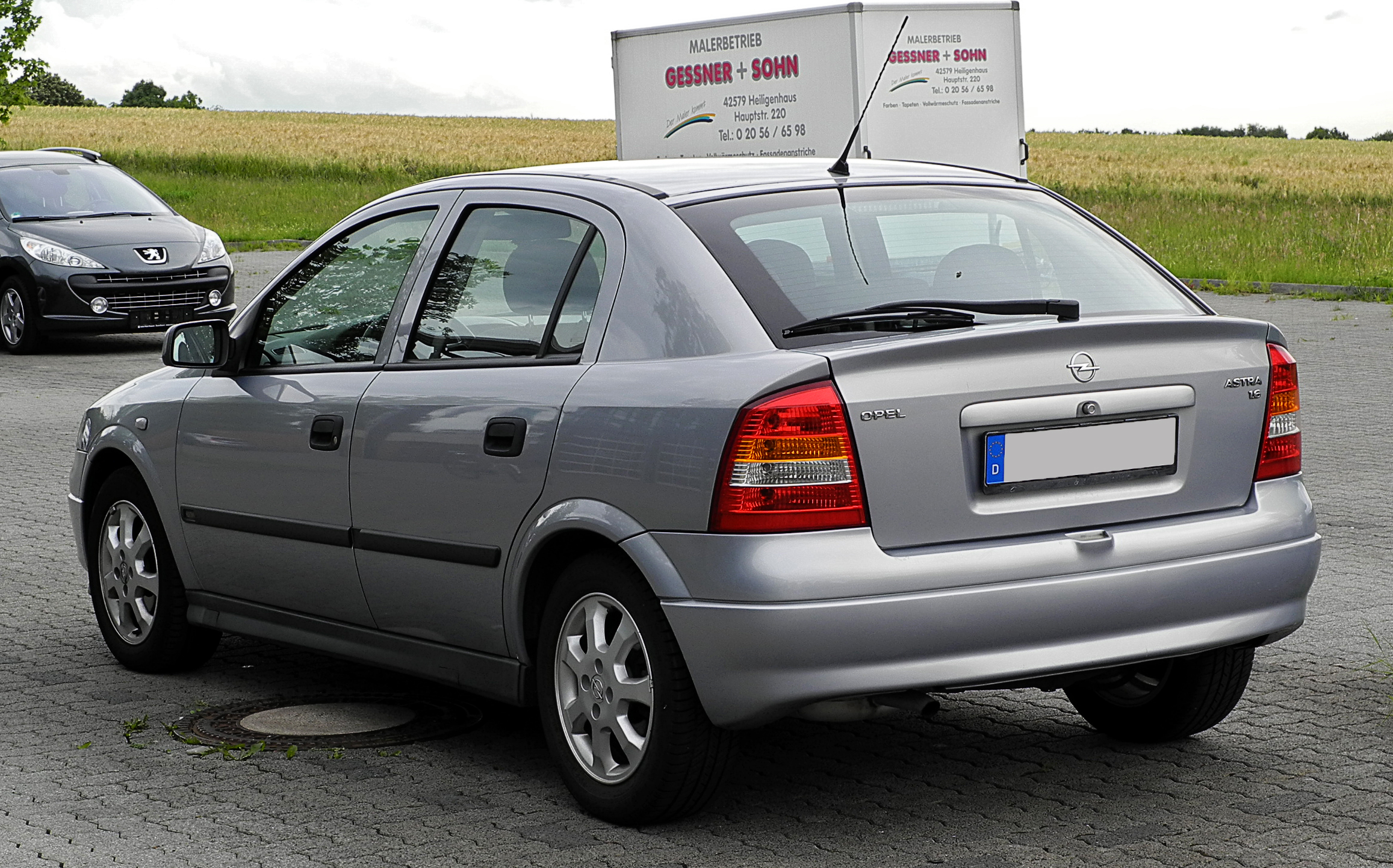
5-door

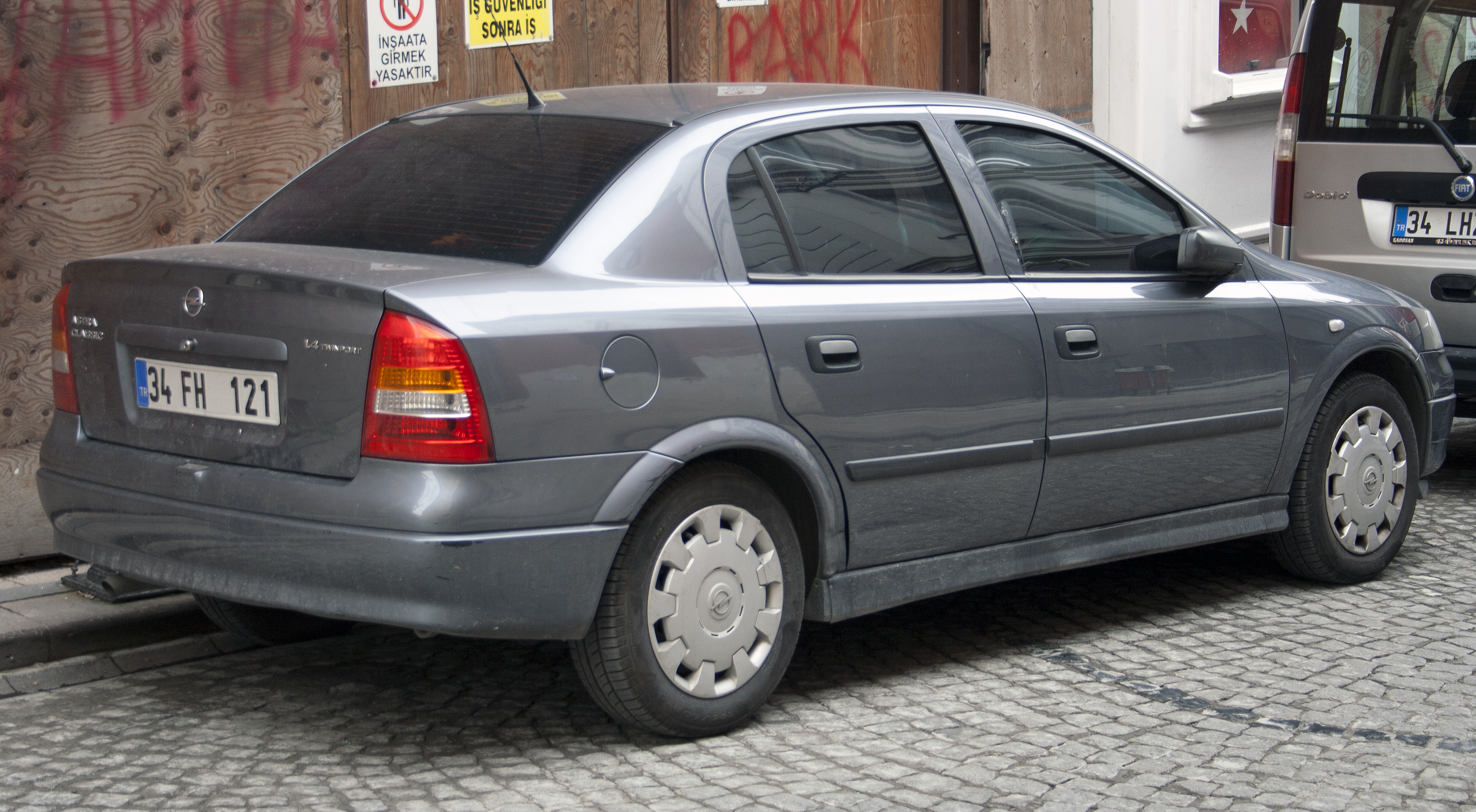
Saloon

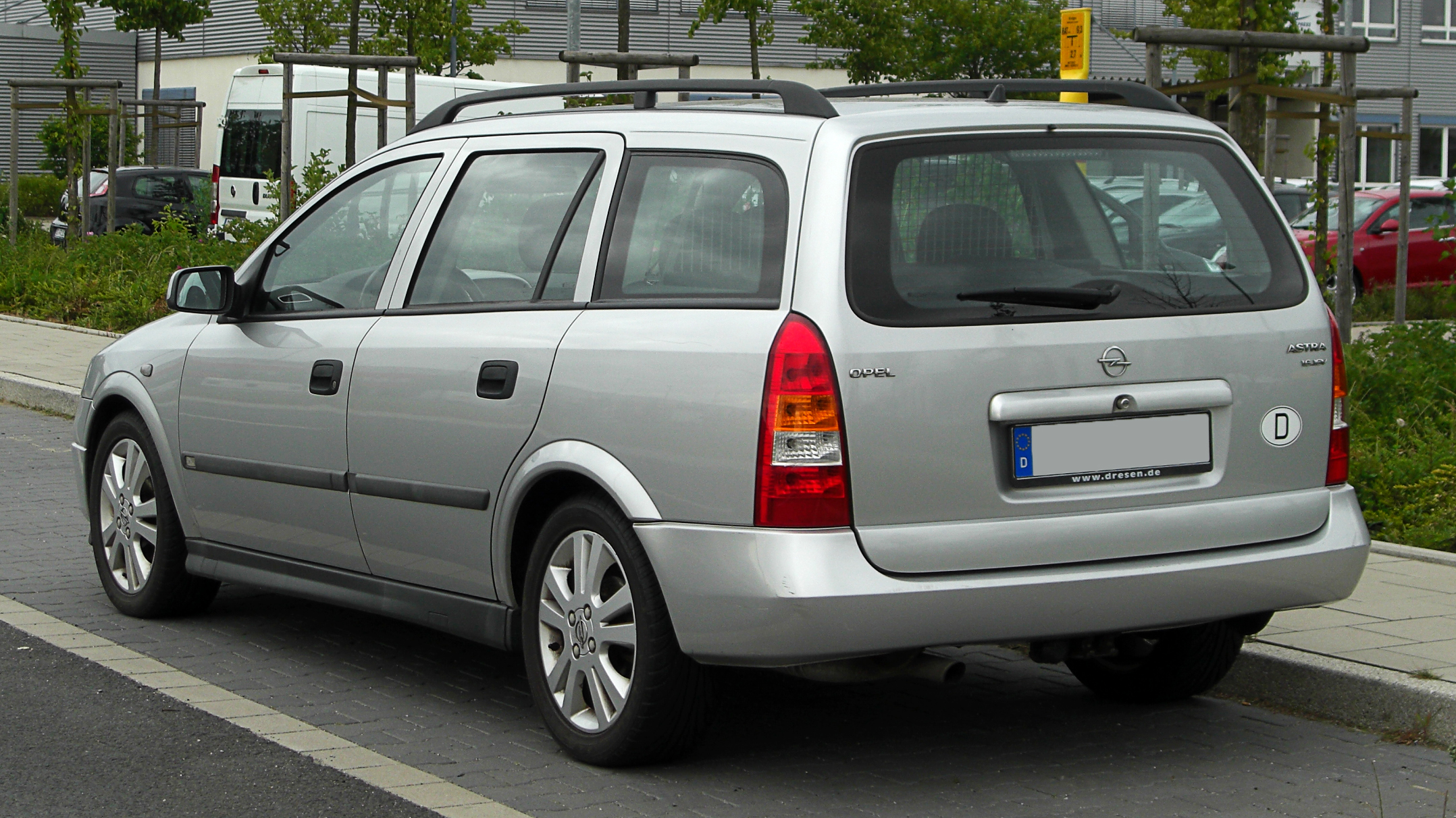
Caravan

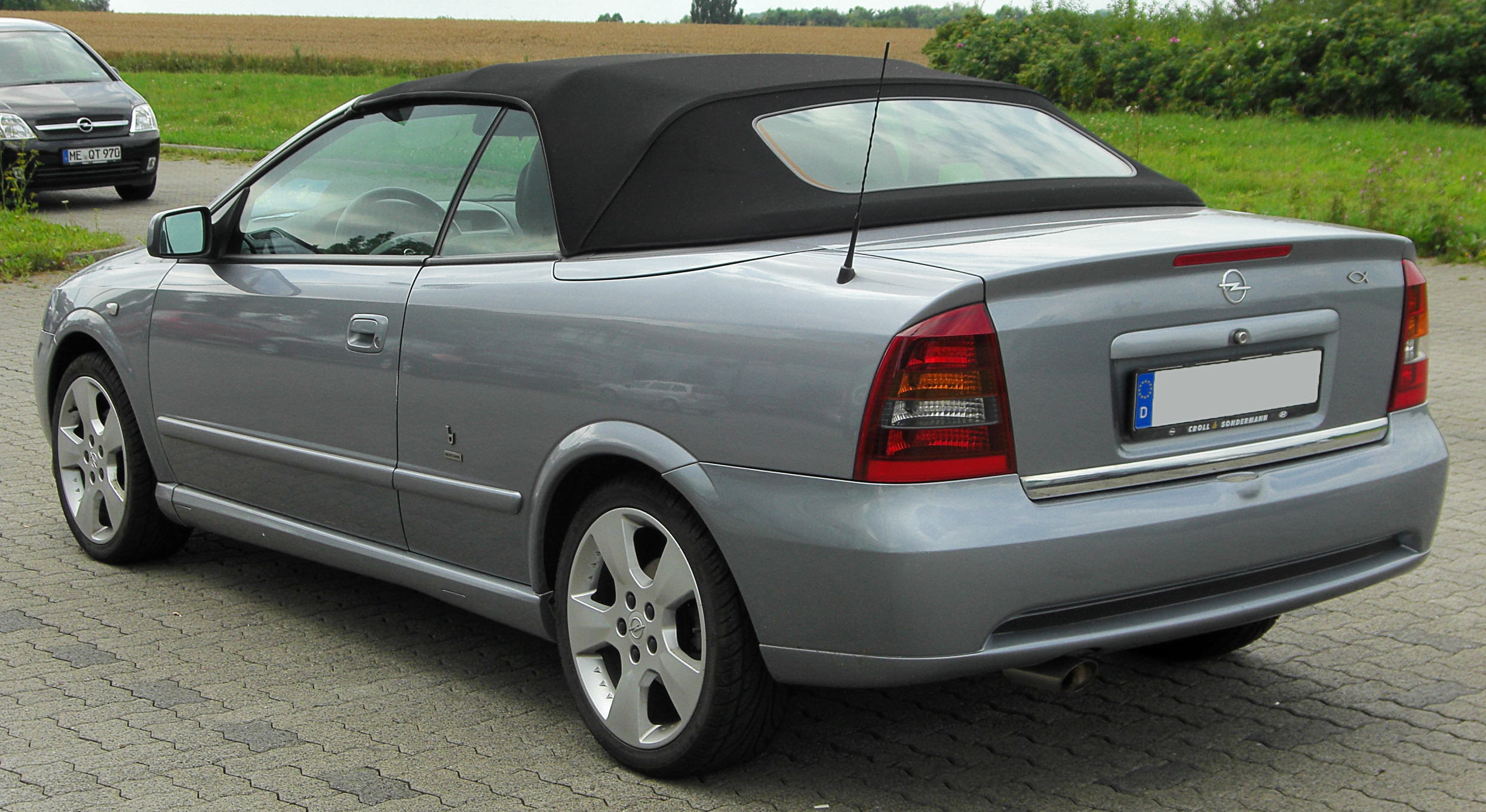
Cabriolet

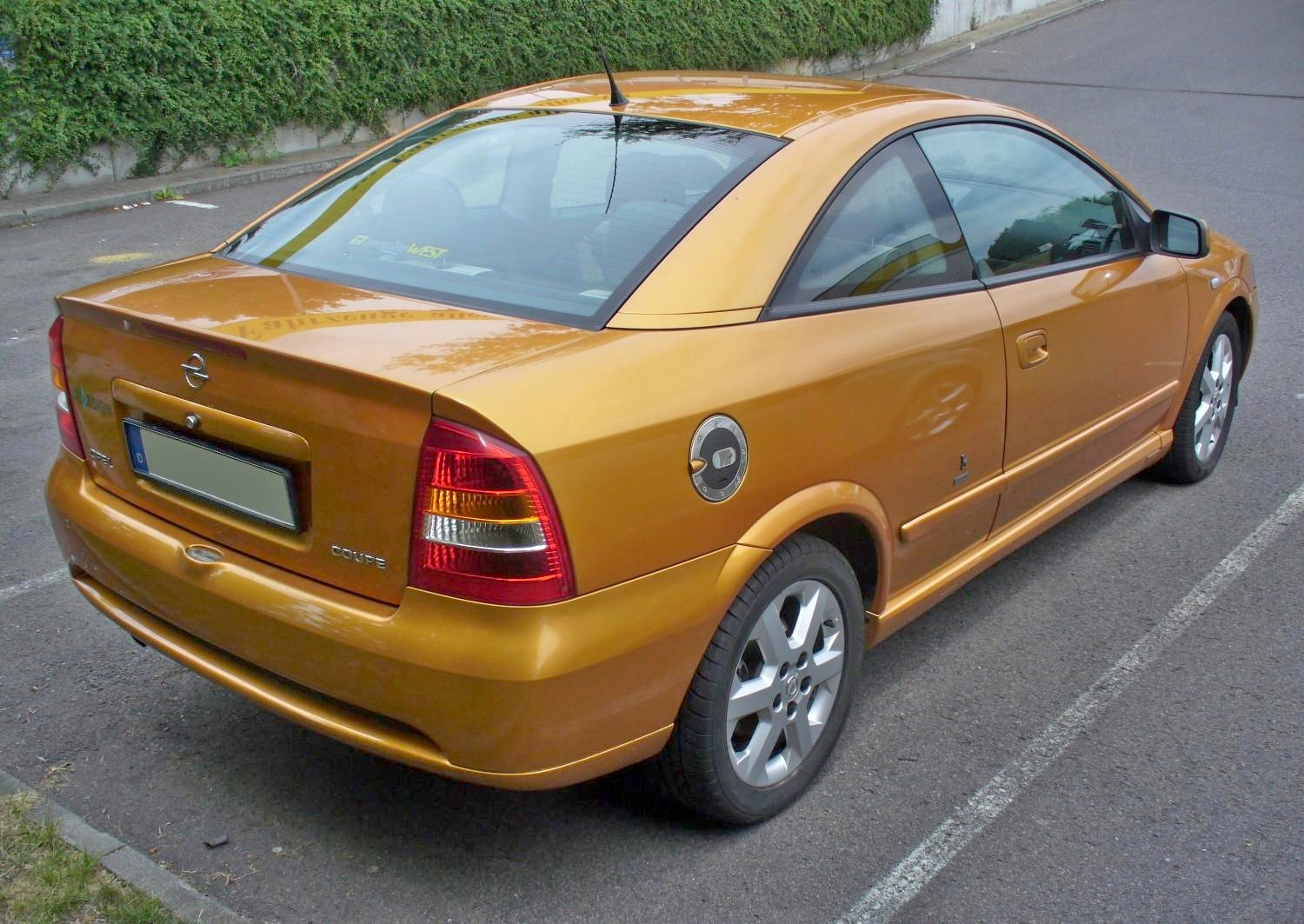
Coupé

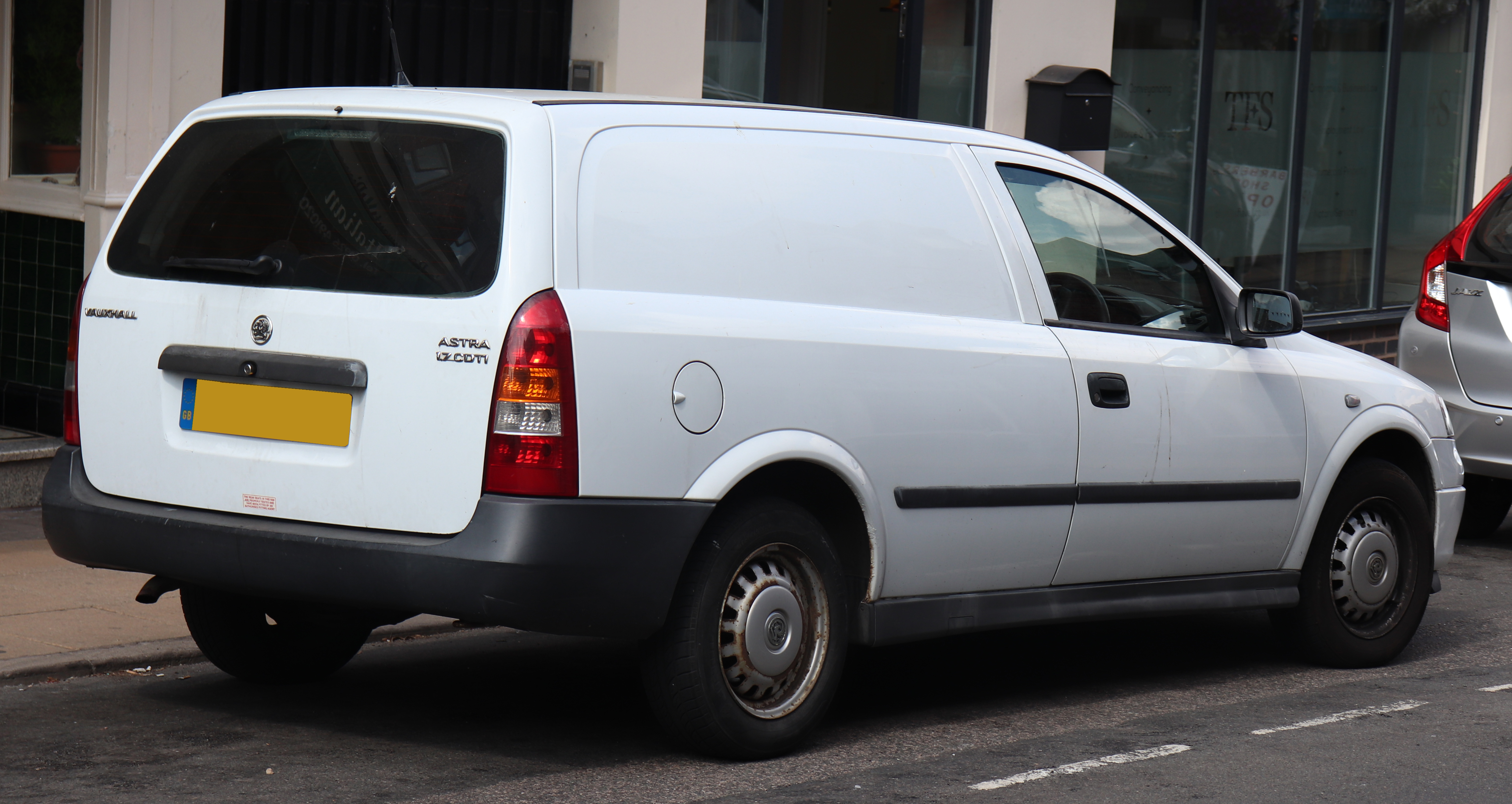
Astravan

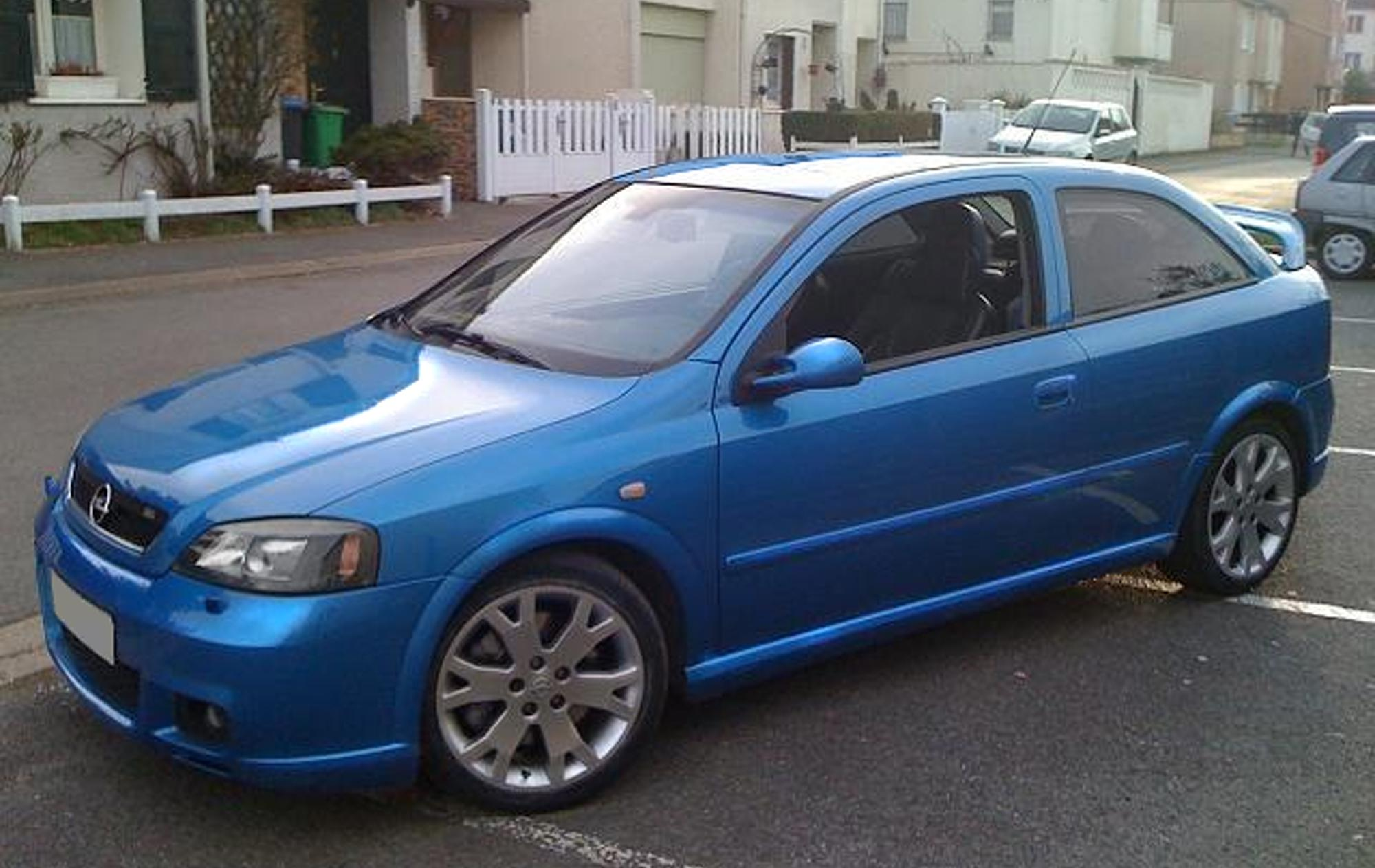
Opel Astra G OPC

=== Markets ===
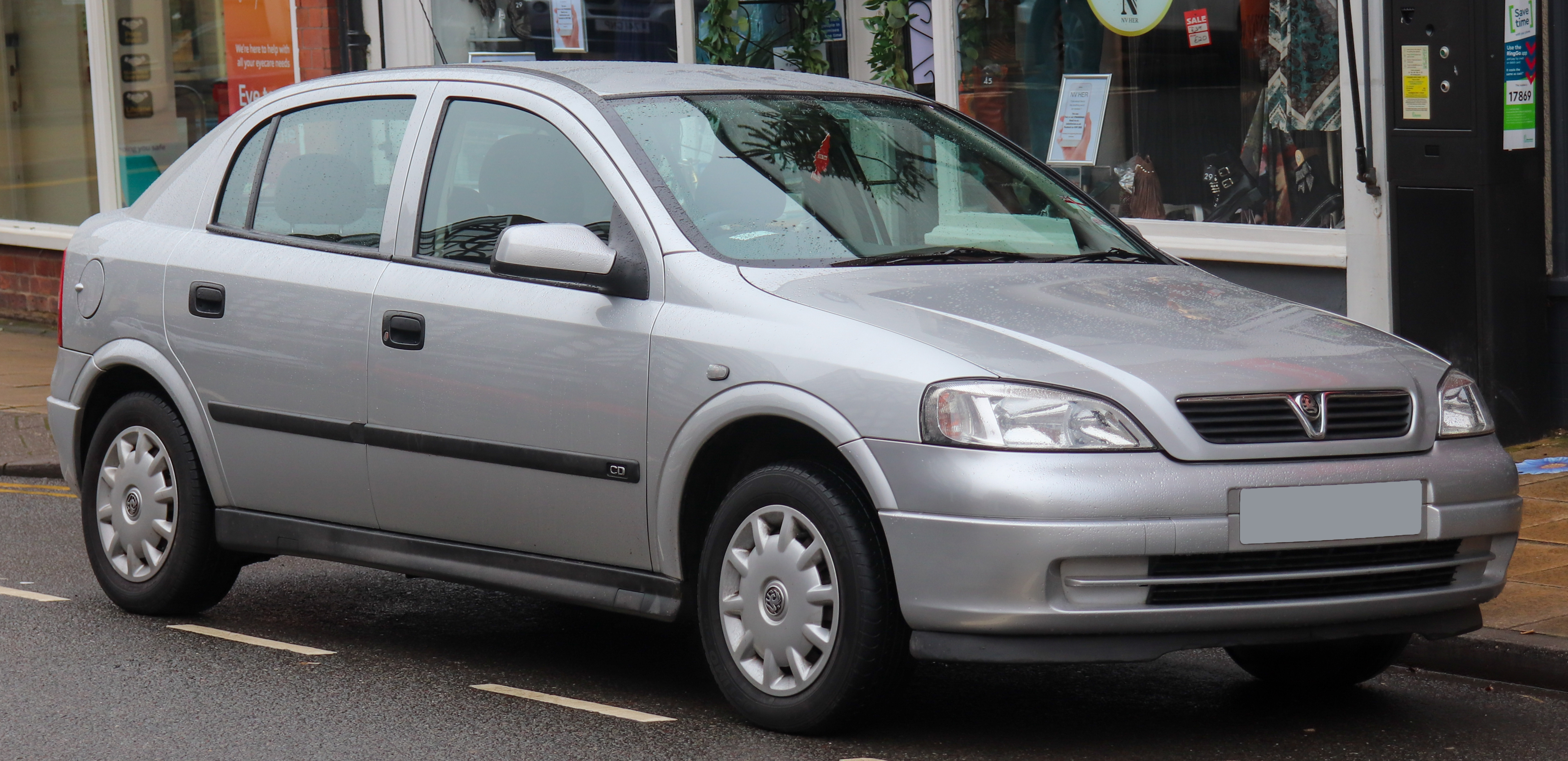
Vauxhall Astra Mk4 (United Kingdom)

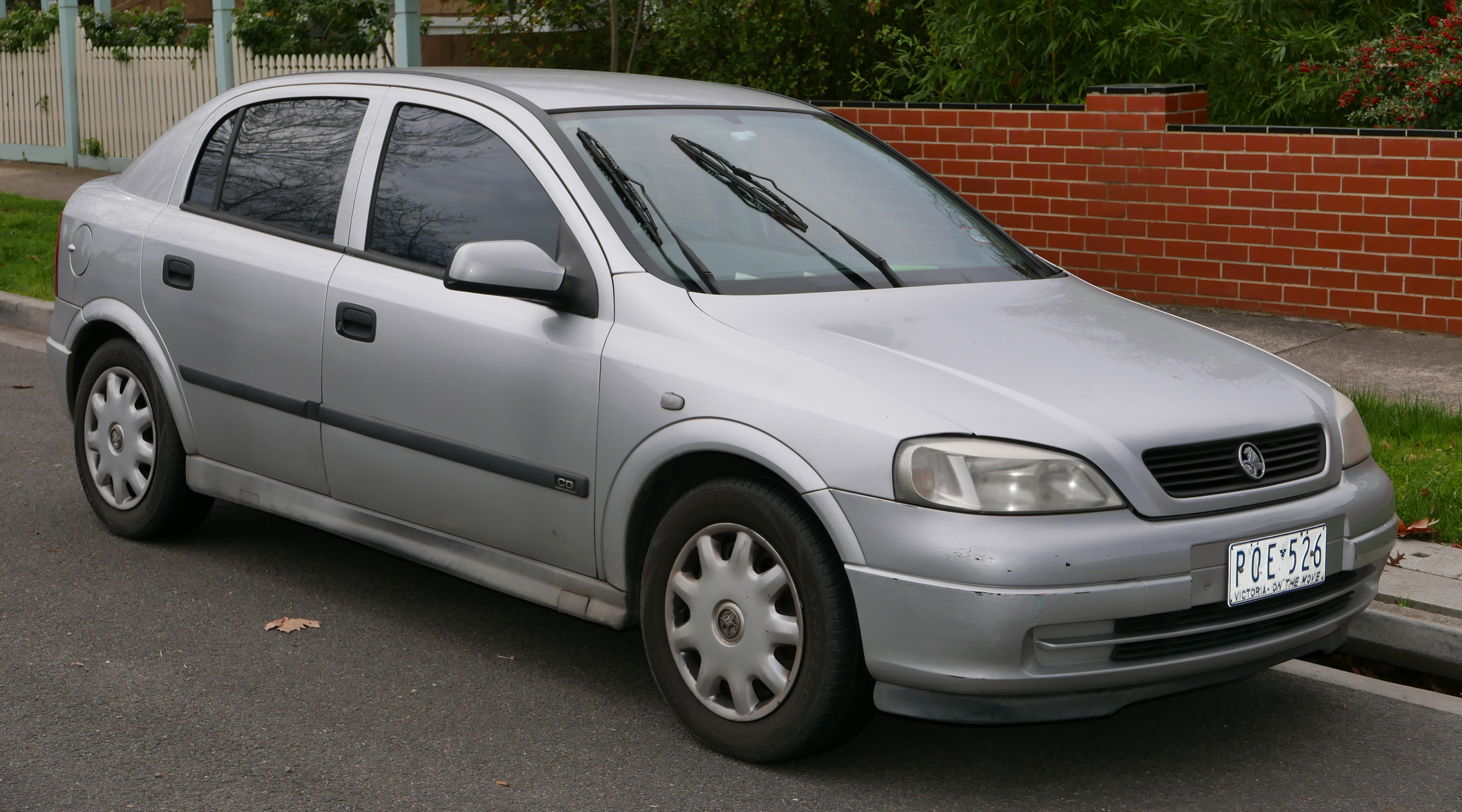
Holden Astra TS (Australia and New Zealand)

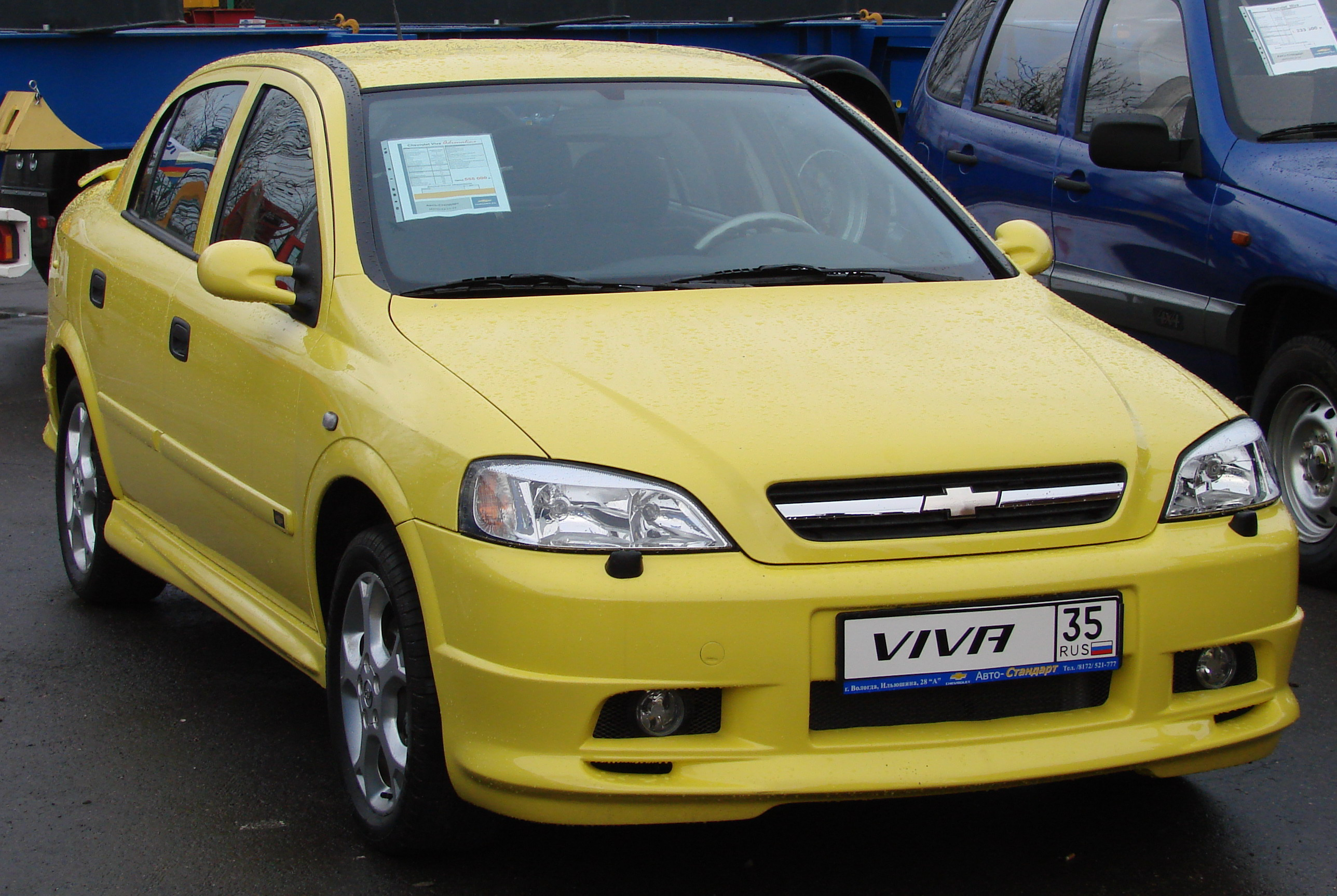
Chevrolet Viva (Russia)

=== V8 Coupe in DTM ===
The Astra G series Coupé was used for the silhouette racing cars in the DTM series. These DTM racing cars are purpose-built race cars with barely any parts taken from the road cars except for lights and door handles. The car's bodywork featured gull-wing doors that were each supported by two gas struts. The racing cars were powered by 4.0L V8 engines with nearly 500 hp (370 kW). Opel did poorly during several seasons of DTM as only Manuel Reuter placed significantly in the championship once, taking second in the inaugural season in 2000 before withdrawing at the end of 2005, but the car was also used to win the 24h Nürburgring in 2003.

=== Xtreme ===
The Astra Xtreme, a concept car presented at the 2001 Geneva motor show, was a single-production V8-powered Astra based on the G-series Astra DTM. Like the DTM racing car, it featured a 4.0 litres (240 cu in) V8 engine, producing 444 hp (331 kW), gull-wing doors supported by gas struts, carbon fibre panels, and race-specification interior with five-point seatbelts.

==== Gallery ====
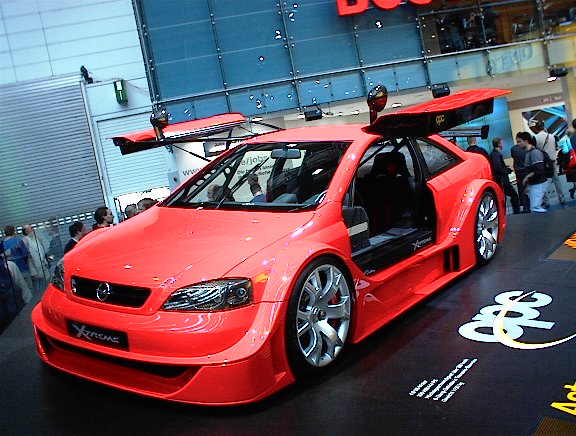
Opel Astra G OPC Xtreme

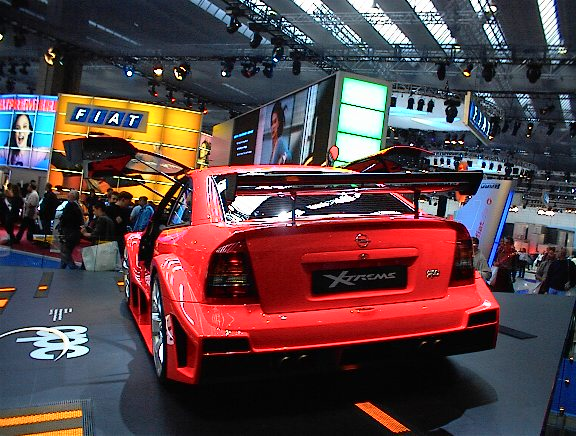
Rear view

=== Stock Car Brazil ===
The season of 2005 also joined the history of Stock Car. In addition to the category becoming multi - the first time the Mitsubishi Lancer ran alongside the Chevrolet Astra, on 30 October 2005, 40 cars with Stock Car V8 engines performed an unprecedented race outside of Brazil worth points for the championship. It was a round to the side of TC 2000, the main category of Argentina and in July had run in Curitiba (Autodromo Internacional de Curitiba). The Autódromo Juan y Oscar Gálvez got a crowd of 70,000 people. Giuliano Losacco was the winner, with Mateus Greipel second and Luciano Burti third.

The engine was a V8 Chevrolet 350 imported from the United States by JL, similar to that used in Busch Series, the second category of NASCAR, equal and limited to 450 hp (336 kW). The automaker GM was sponsoring the category, providing the fairing of the Astra, making room for other manufacturers to enter the category with a low investment.

=== Safety ===
Euro NCAP test results* Opel Astra 1.6i Envoy (LHD) (1999)
Test	Score	Rating
Adult occupant:	25	4 /5 stars
Pedestrian:	7	1 /4 stars

== Third generation (Astra H – A04; 2004) ==
Third generation (Astra H)
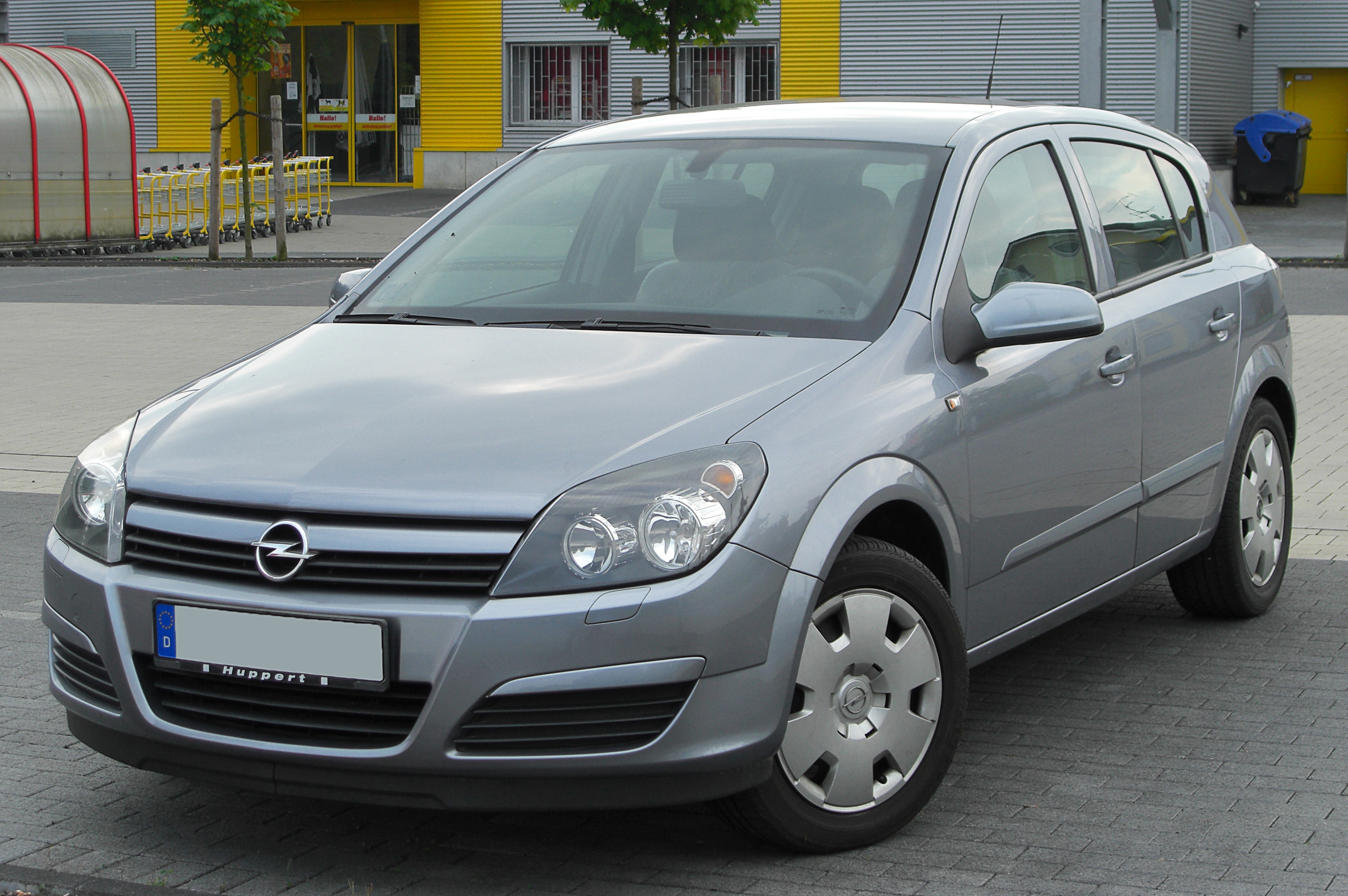
- Opel Astra H 5-door (front, pre-facelift)

Overview
- Model code: A04
- Also called: Vauxhall Astra (United Kingdom); Holden Astra (Australia and New Zealand); Saturn Astra (North America); Chevrolet Astra; Chevrolet Vectra (Argentina and Brazil)
- Production: 2004–2014 (Opel); October 2005–2011 (Chevrolet); 2008–2009 (Saturn)
- Assembly: Belgium: Antwerp (Opel's Antwerp Plant); Brazil: São Caetano do Sul (GM do Brasil); Egypt: 6th of October City (GME); Germany: Bochum; Poland: Gliwice; Russia: Kaliningrad (Avtotor); Russia: St. Petersburg (2008–2009); Ukraine: Zaporizhzhia (AvtoZAZ); United Kingdom: Ellesmere Port
- Designer: Friedhelm Engler

Body and chassis
- Body style: 3-door hatchback coupé (GTC); 5-door hatchback 4-door sedan / saloon 5-door wagon / estate 2-door convertible (TwinTop); 3-door sedan delivery (panel van)
- Layout: GM T platform
- Platform: T platform
- Related: Opel Zafira B

Powertrain
- Engine: Petrol: 1.2 L Z12XEP I4; 1.4 L Z14XEL I4; 1.4 L Z14XEP TwinPort I4; 1.6 L Z16XEP/XE1/XER/A16XER I4; 1.6 L Z16LET turbo I4; 1.8 L Z18XE/XER I4; 2.0 L Z20LEL/LER/LEH turbo I4; 2.2 L Z22YH I4 (Australia); FlexPower: 2.0 L I4 (Brazil); 2.4 L I4 (Brazil); Diesel: 1.3 L MultiJet CDTI I4; 1.7 L Z17DTL/DTH/DTJ/DTR CDTI I4; 1.9 L MultiJet CDTI I4
- Transmission: 5-speed F17 manual 6-speed manual 5-speed Easytronic automated manual 4-speed Aisin 60-40LE automatic 6-speed automatic

Dimensions
- Wheelbase: 2,614 mm (102.9 in) (hatchback, TwinTop); 2,703 mm (106.4 in) (sedan, wagon)
- Length: 5-door hatch: 4,249 mm (167.3 in); 3-door GTC: 4,288 mm (168.8 in); Sedan: 4,587 mm (180.6 in); Wagon: 4,515 mm (177.8 in); TwinTop: 4,476 mm (176.2 in)
- Width: 1,753 mm (69.0 in); 1,759 mm (69.3 in) (TwinTop)
- Height: 5-door hatch: 1,467 mm (57.8 in); 3-door GTC: 1,415 mm (55.7 in); Sedan: 1,458 mm (57.4 in); Wagon: 1,500 mm (59.1 in); TwinTop: 1,411 mm (55.6 in)

Chronology
- Predecessor: Saturn Ion (US)
- Successor: Chevrolet Cruze (Chile and Mexico); Buick Verano (Saturn Astra); Opel Combo (Astravan); Opel Cascada (TwinTop)

The Astra H was launched in March 2004 as a five-door hatchback, whilst a five-door estate launched late 2004 and a sporty three-door hatchback, designated the GTC (Gran Tourismo Compact) for European markets, Sport Hatch in the UK and the Coupé in Australia, launched in 2005. The GTC has the option of a windscreen called "panoramic windscreen" (unique for a production car at the time of its launch) which extends into the roof area. Based on an updated version of GM's T platform, its size was increased compared to the previous version. Production came until the end of 2009, excepting the TwinTop which continued to be manufactured until November 2010.

The ageing Vectra B was replaced in Brazil with a sedan version of the Astra H, named Chevrolet Vectra, until it was replaced by the Chevrolet Cruze in 2009, though the sedan version of the Vectra continued to be sold alongside the Cruze until 2011 when the Cruze fully replaced it. The model was matched with the other models offered in Brazil. This version was offered as an Opel in some Eurasian markets in 2006, following a debut at the international auto show in Istanbul, Turkey, including Ireland in 2008. This was manufactured in Gliwice, Poland. Also in 2006, the Astravan, a 3-door van variant of the estate, was launched. In September 2007, a version of the 5-door Astra was launched in Brazil, marketed as Chevrolet Vectra GT to differentiate from the already existing Astra, which was replaced by the Chevrolet Cruze hatchback in 2011.

The Opel Astra was revised in January 2007, with the introduction of different colours of the posterior lighthouses and a new front.

GM Russia launched SKD assembly of Astra on a temporary production site near Saint Petersburg in February 2008, with a potential capacity of 25,000 vehicles annually.

The Chevrolet Astra was withdrawn from Mexico in 2008 as a result of the withdrawal of Opel products from the brand, replaced by the Chevrolet Cruze sedan for the 2010 model year.

A first for any major European car is the availability of digital radio on some versions of the new Astra, while for the Astra product class first are electronically controlled chassis (IDS+) and AFL (Adaptive Forward Lighting).

This generation was kept in production in Bochum alongside the new Astra J and sold as the Opel Astra Classic III in some Eastern European markets such as Poland and Turkey. The Classic III was available as a 5-door hatchback, saloon, and estate. Production of the Opel Astra Classic III eventually ended in 2014.

At the end of 2012, the Astravan was replaced by the new Opel Combo D.

=== Pre-facelift ===
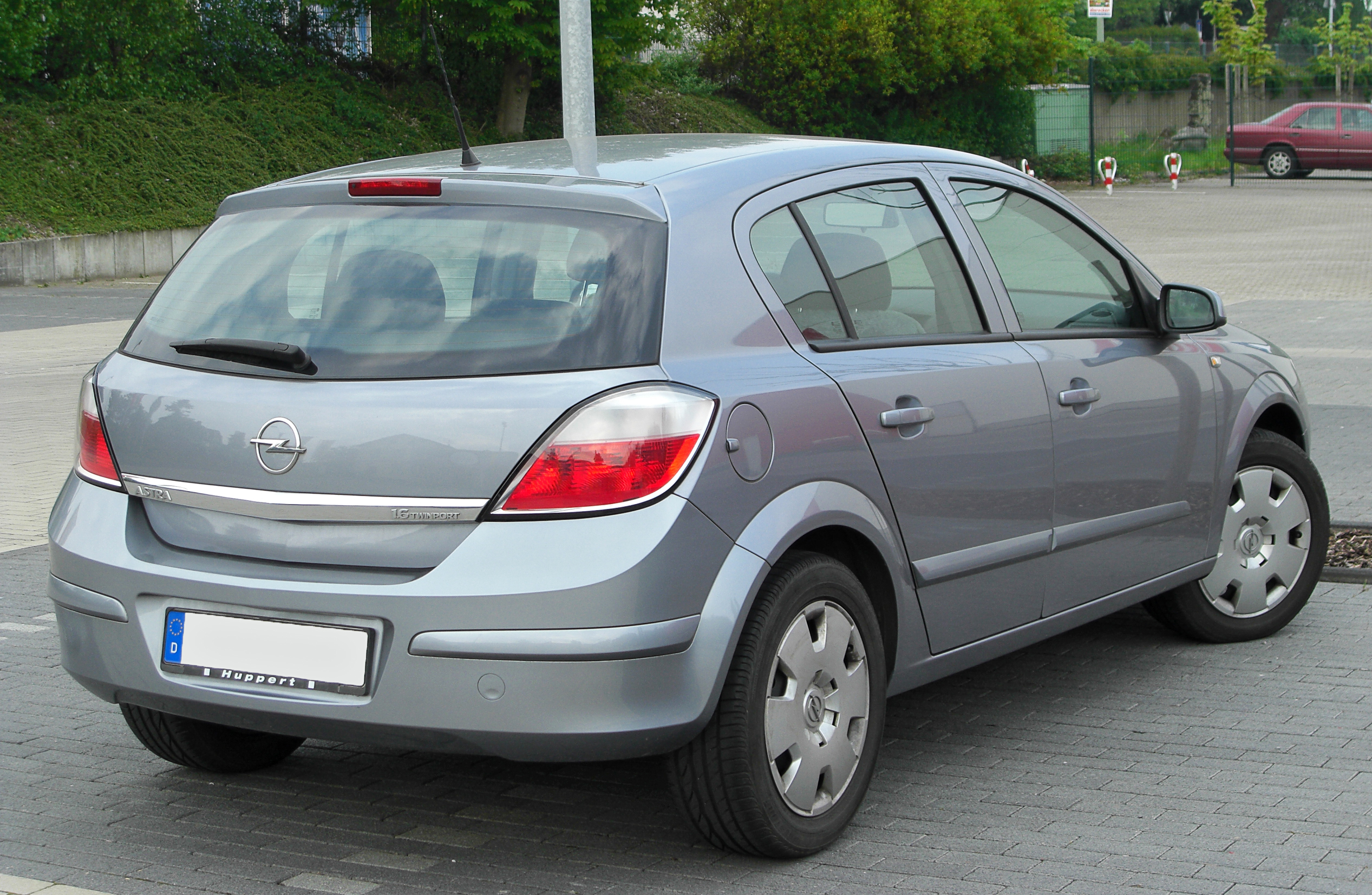
Opel Astra H 5-door (rear, pre-facelift)

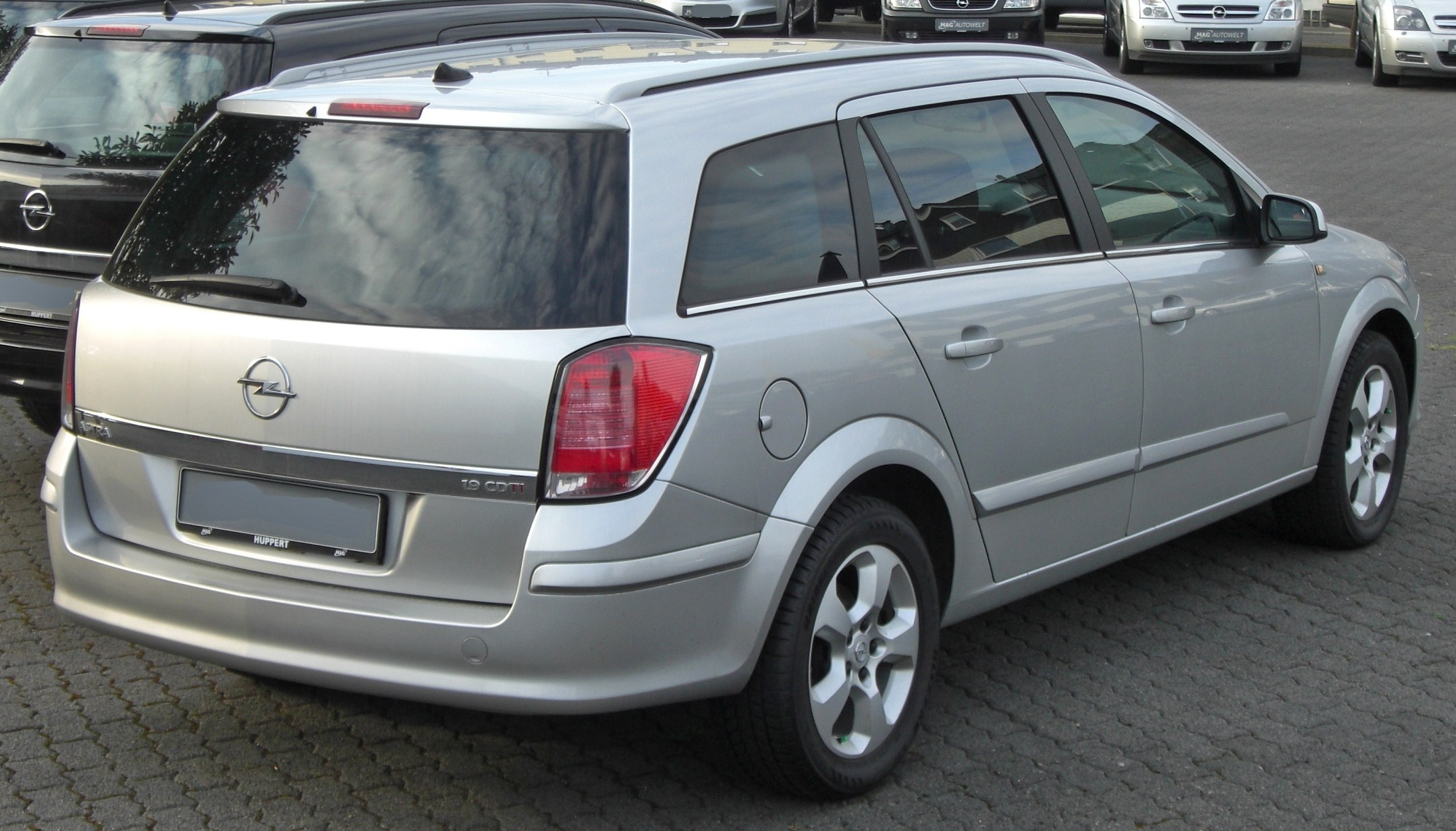
Opel Astra H Caravan (rear, pre-facelift)

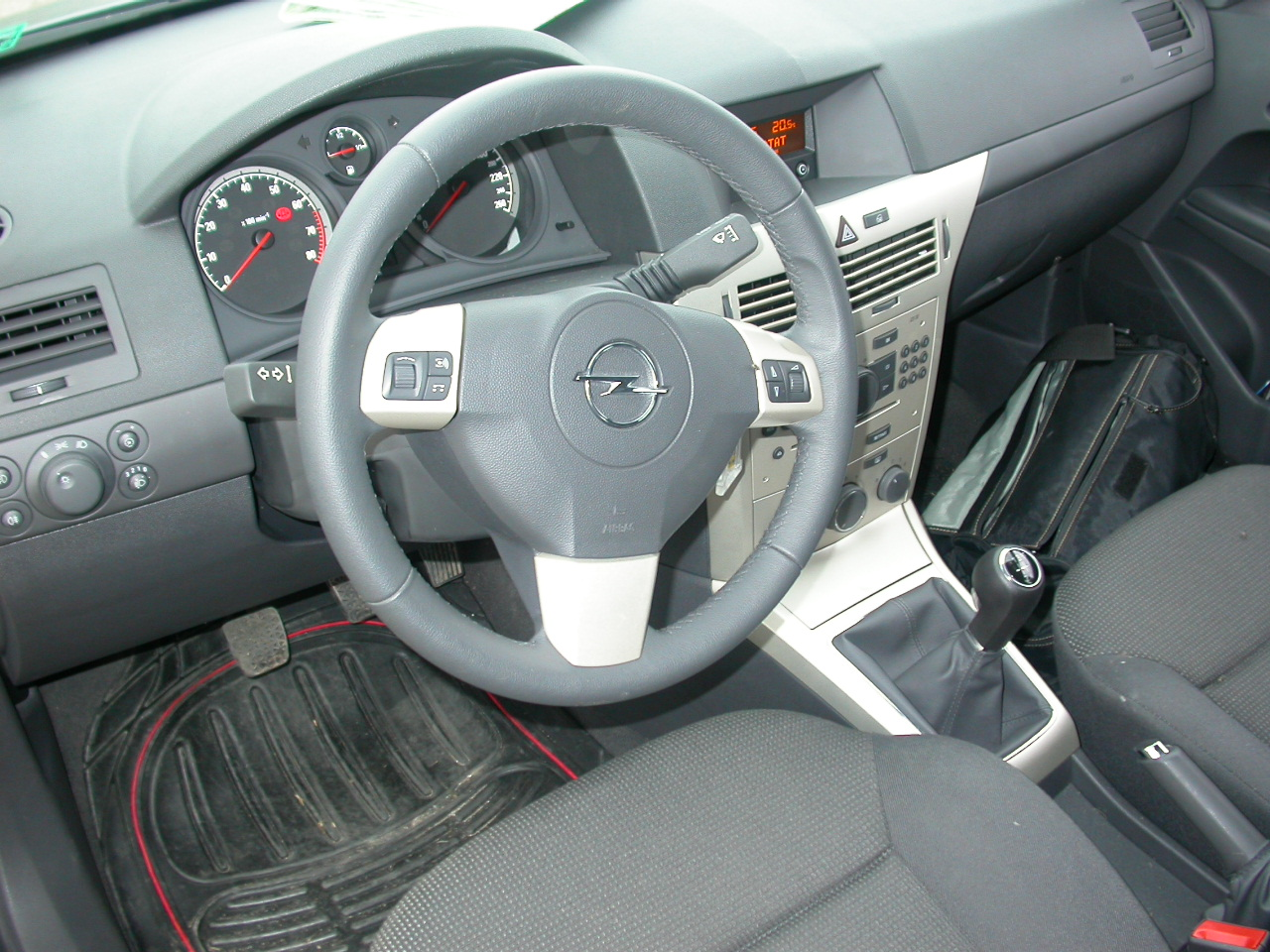
Interior

=== Facelift ===
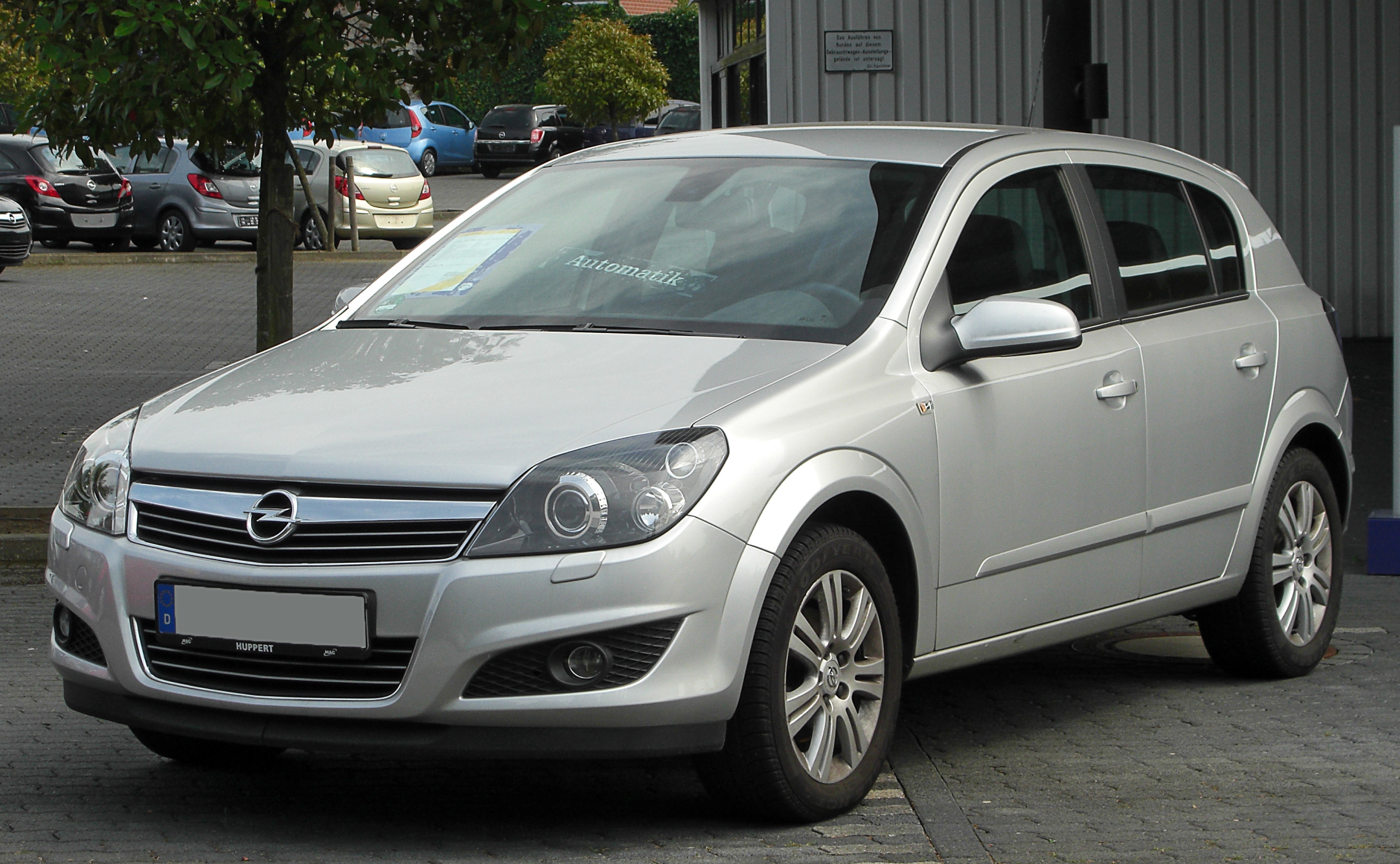
Opel Astra 5-door (front, post-facelift)

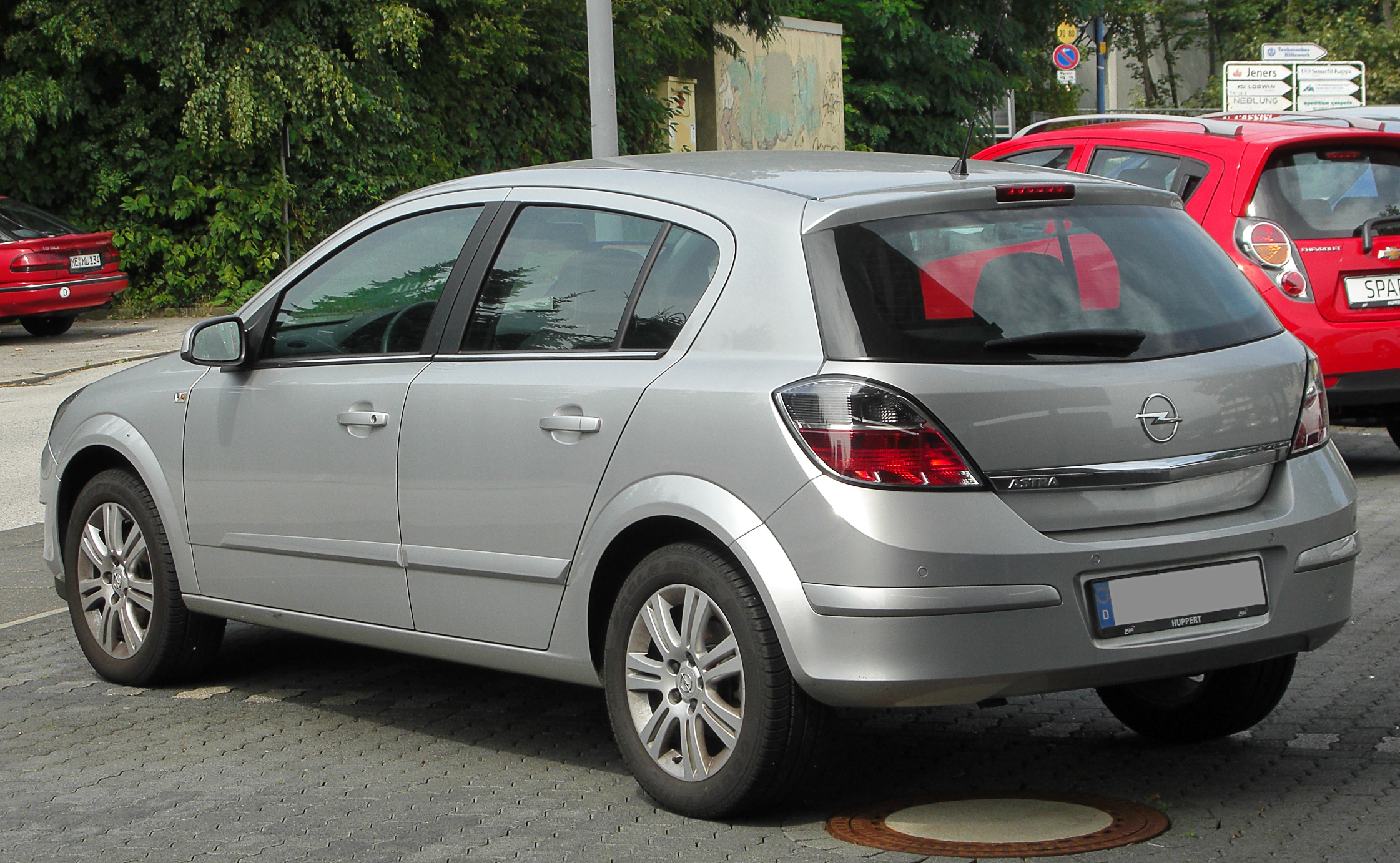
Opel Astra 5-door (rear, post-facelift)

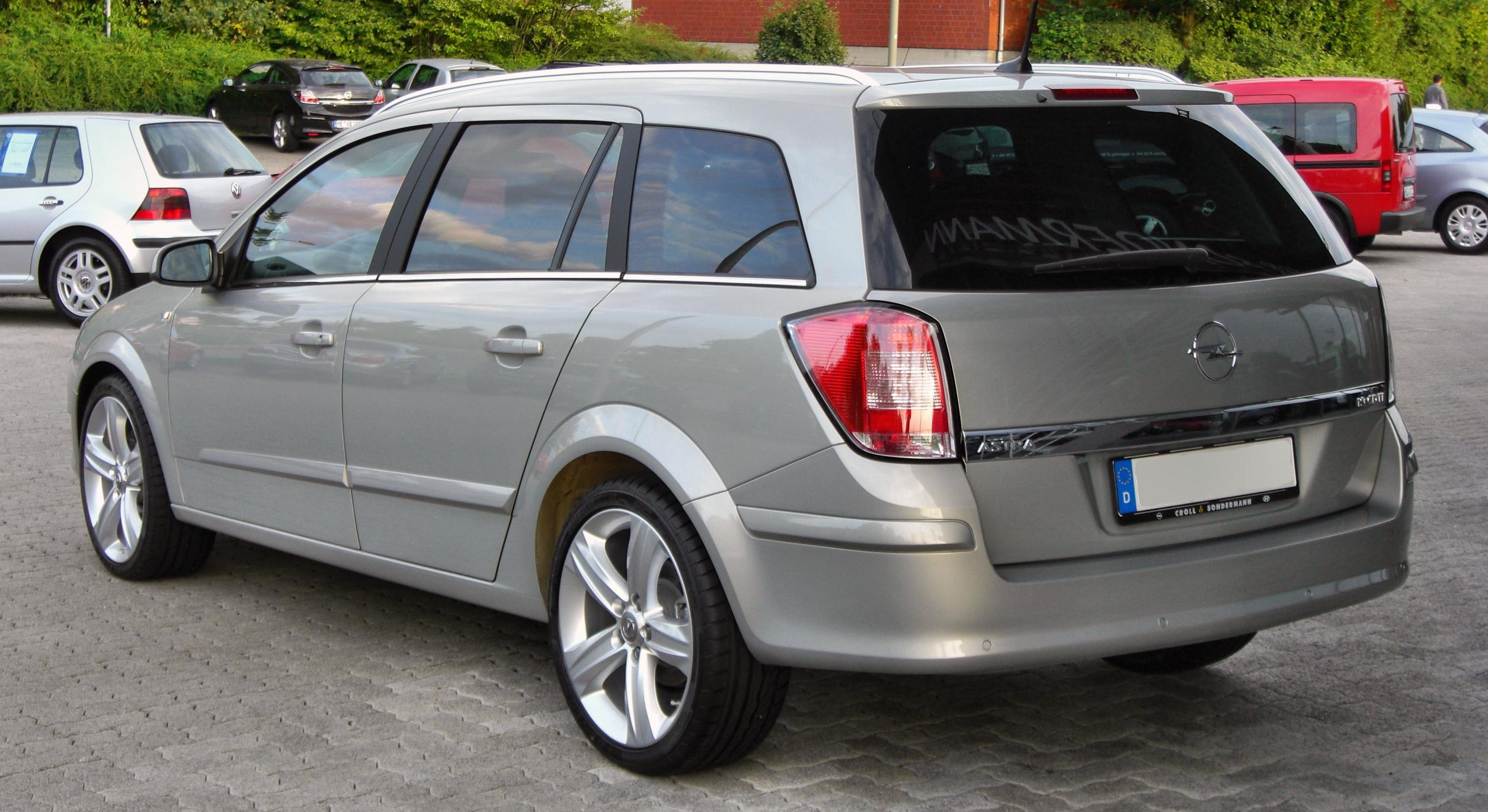
Opel Astra H Caravan (rear, post-facelift)

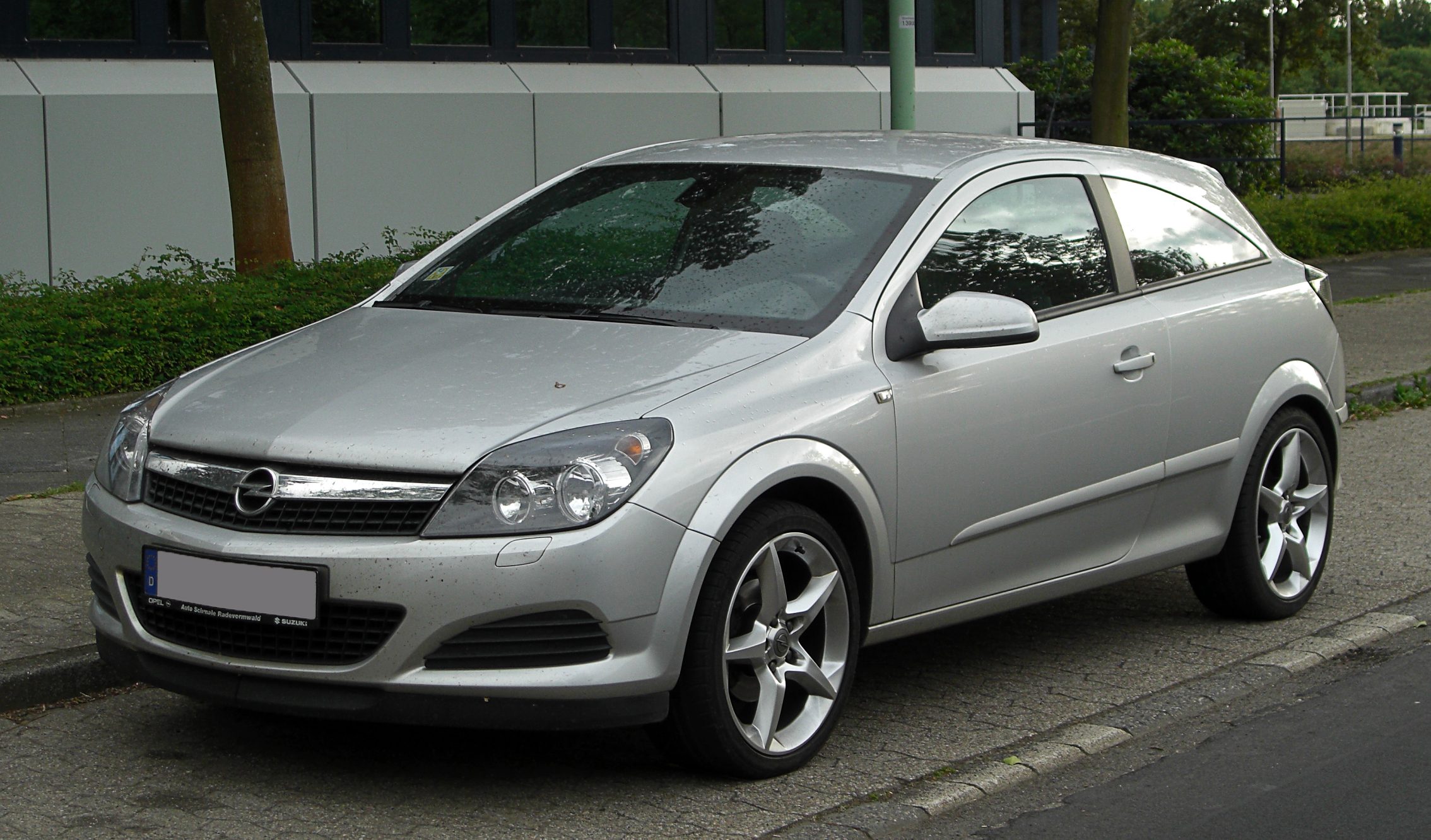
Opel Astra H GTC (front, post-facelift)

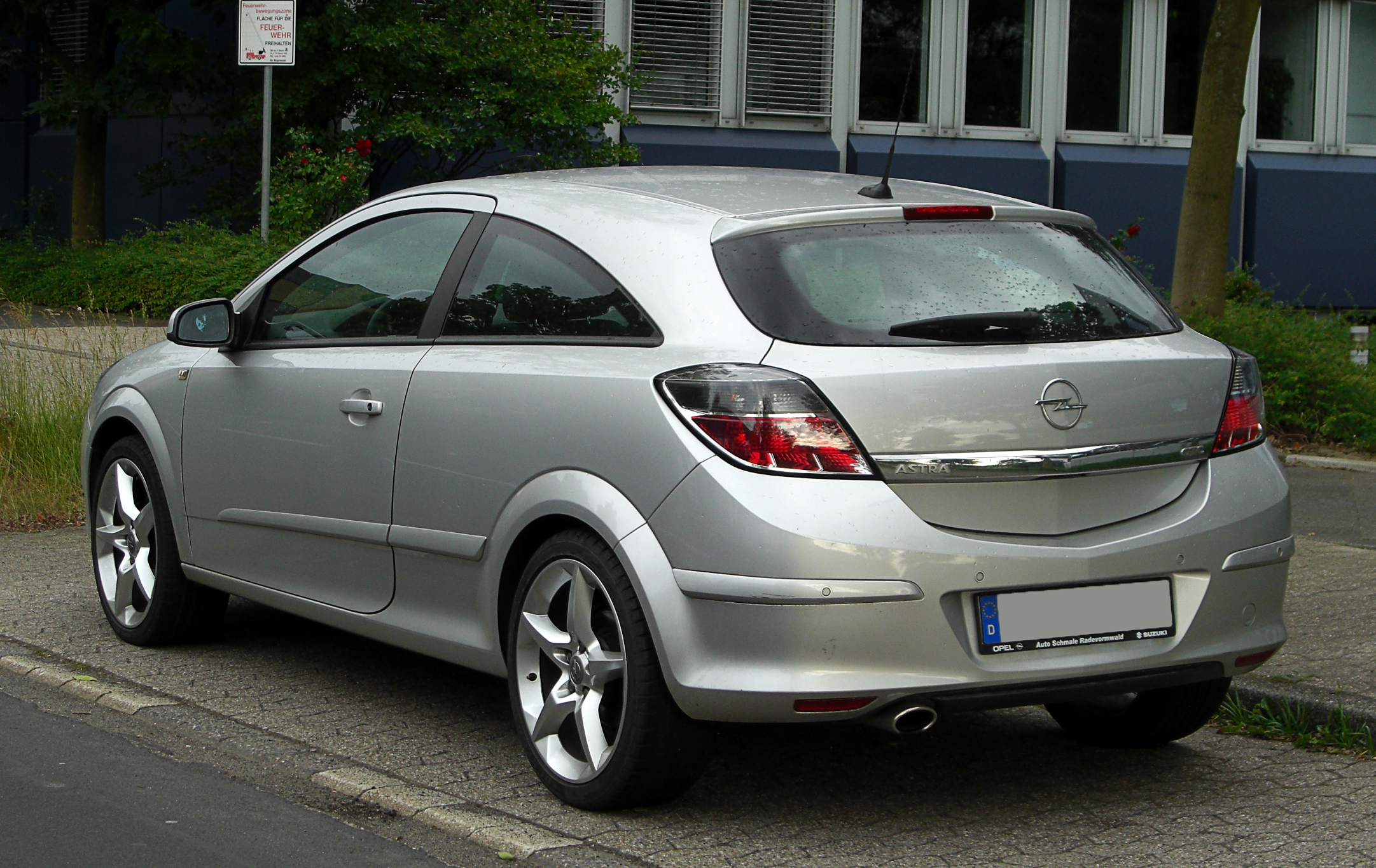
Opel Astra H GTC (rear, post-facelift)

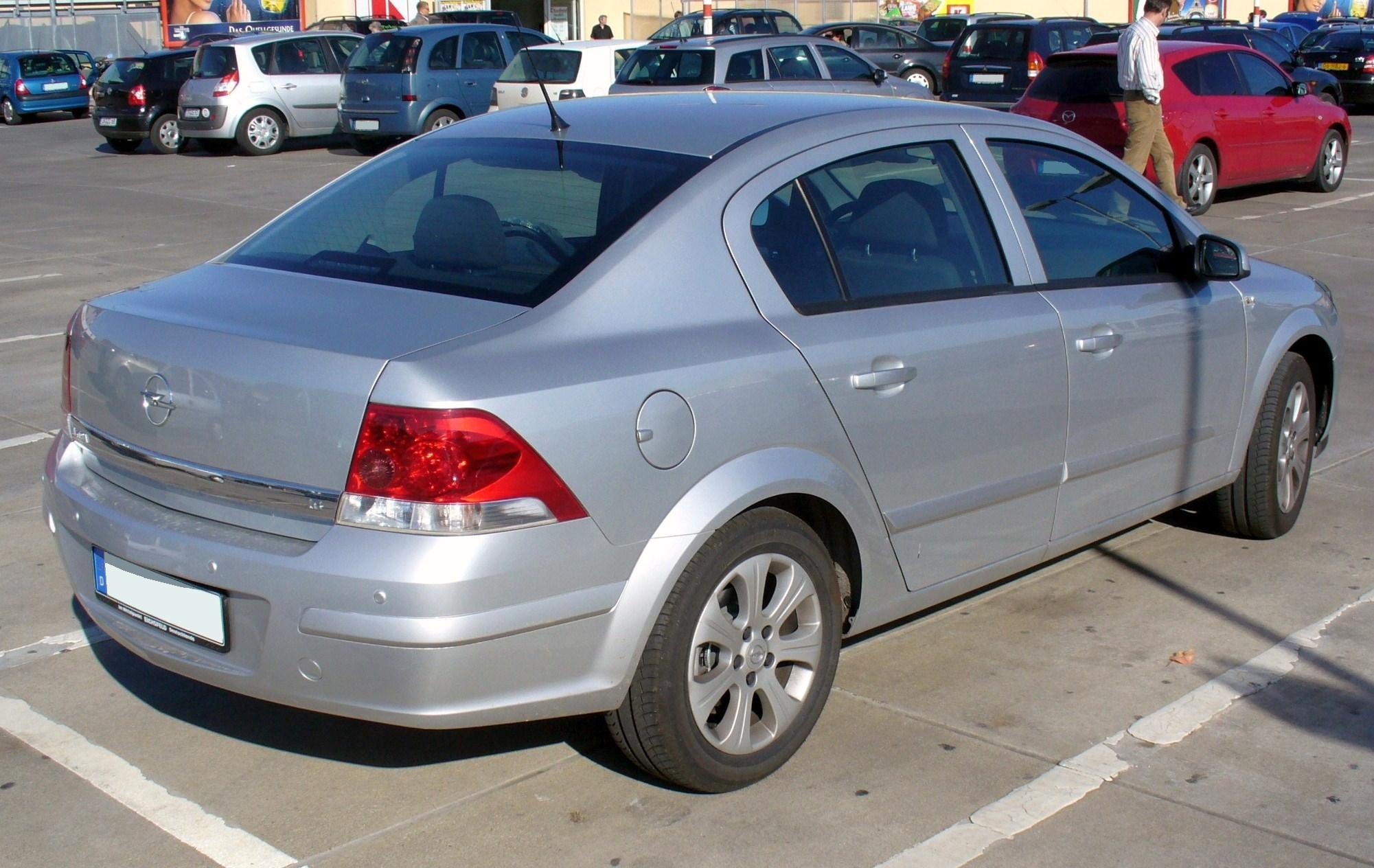
Opel Astra sedan (rear, post-facelift)

=== OPC ===
During 2005, Opel introduced the OPC version of the Astra GTC (sold as the Astra VXR in the UK) which is powered by an updated version of the 2.0 L turbo Family II engine (Z20 LEH) producing 240 PS (177 kW, 237 bhp) and 320 N⋅m (236 lb⋅ft) of torque. Standard features of the OPC version include sports bodykit and recaro interior, a six-speed manual gearbox, xenon headlamps and 18-inch alloy wheels amongst others.

This vehicle was sold until late 2009 in Australia and New Zealand by Holden Special Vehicles as the HSV VXR. HSV VXRs but it never offered a sedan in the UK and Australia are sold as standard with full leather trim, climate control, 6 disc CD and 19-inch alloy wheels. HSV VXRs were badged as per the UK Vauxhall Spec models but without the usual rear boot badge. The sedan was discontinued in Australia and United Kingdom in 2007. Inside the Opel Blitz appears on the steering wheel with an OPC dashboard. The Astra OPC was also sold as the Chevrolet Astra OPC in Chile.

==== Gallery ====
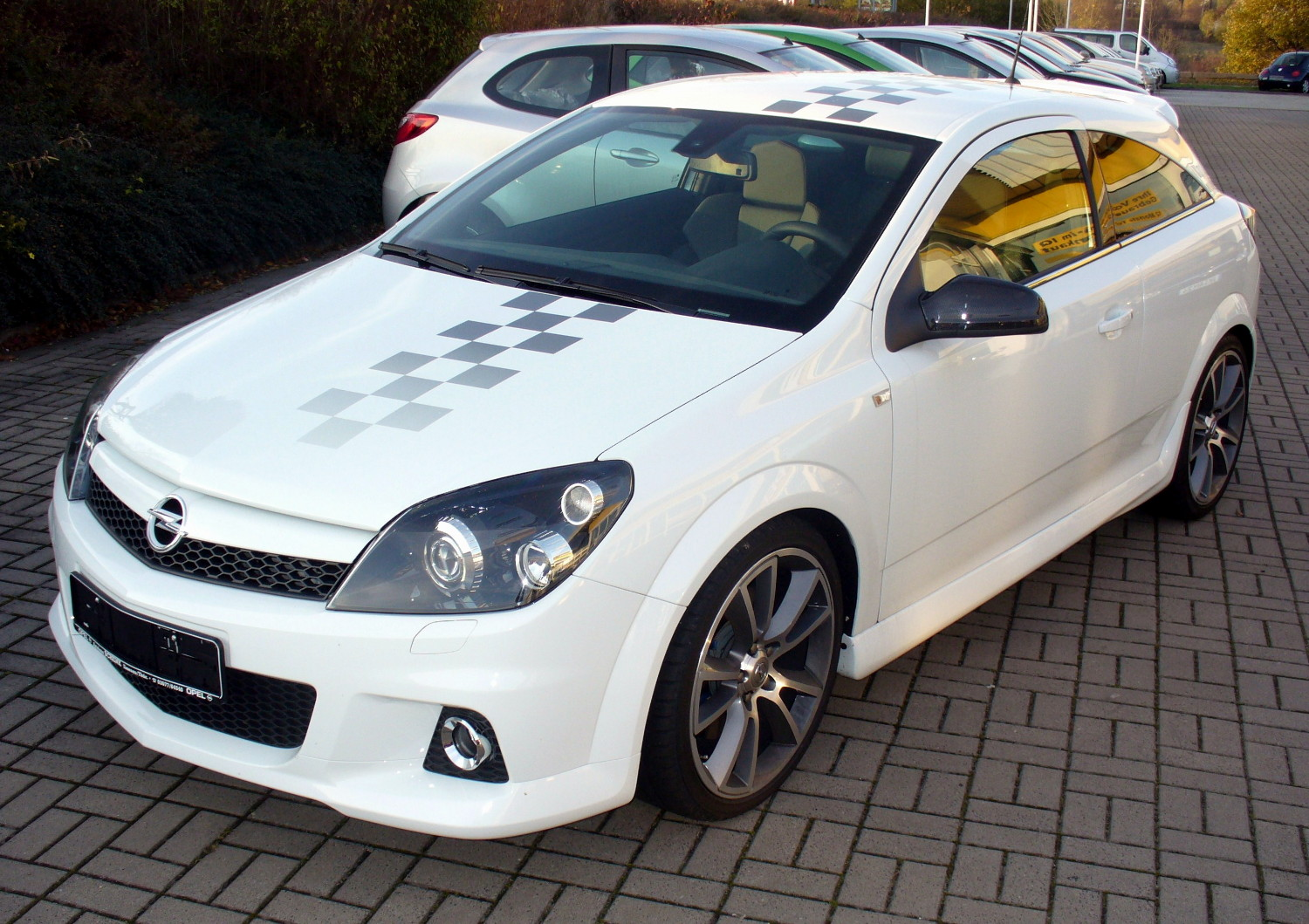
Opel Astra OPC Nürburgring Edition (2008)

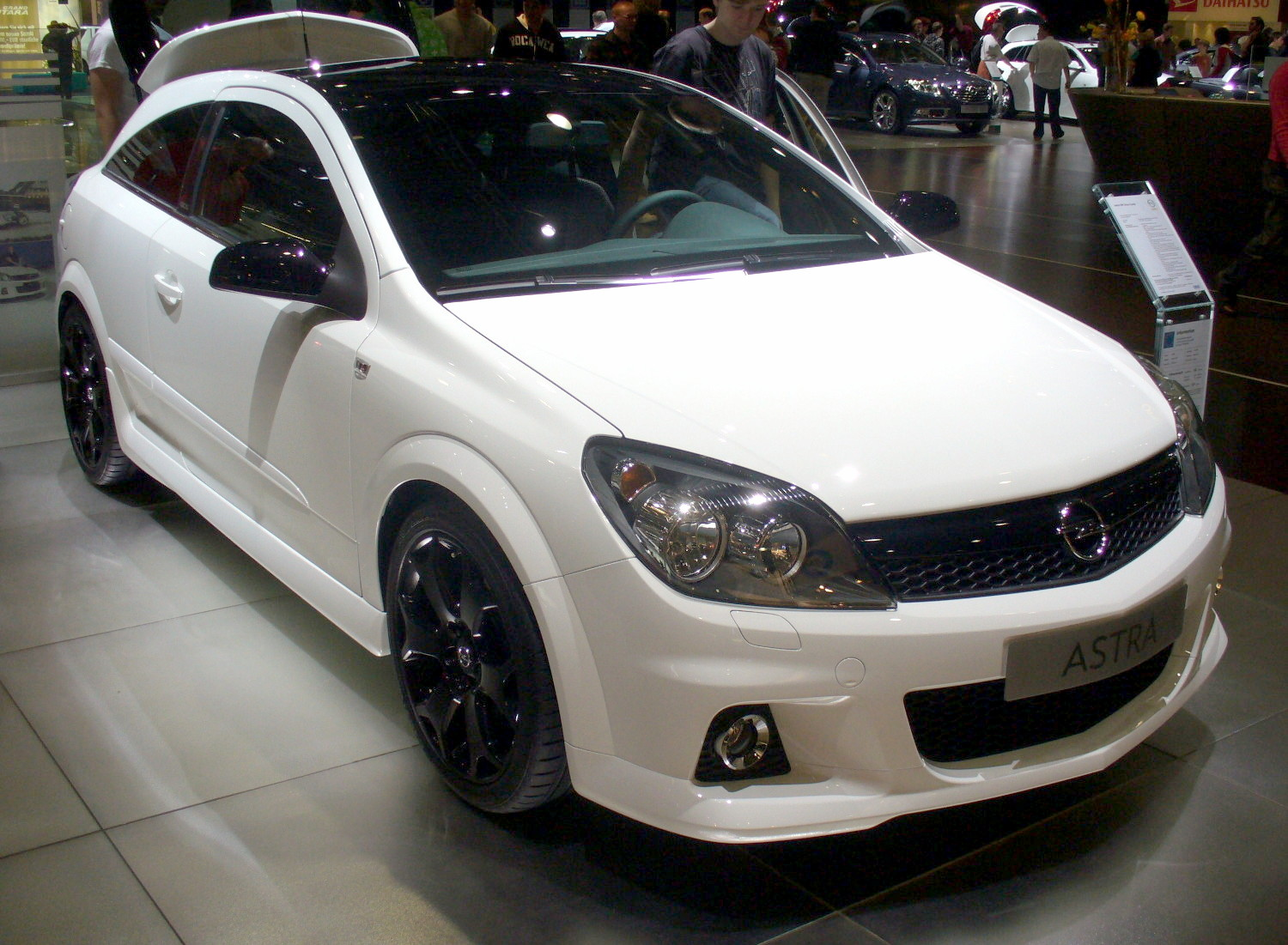
Opel Astra OPC Race Camp (2009)

=== TwinTop ===
In 2006, the Astra TwinTop arrived. (The "TwinTop" name also applies to the smaller Tigra and refers to a retractable hardtop convertible version of the car, shared with the Pontiac G6.) The Astra TwinTop has a three-part folding metal roof which sits in the upper half of the boot space, leaving considerable luggage space below it. Still marketed as a four-seater, the rear seating space is smaller than other Astra models. The TwinTop was available in three trim levels with a range of engines in each, including a 200 PS (147 kW; 197 hp) 2.0 L turbo and the 1.9 CDTI diesel in 150 PS (110 kW; 148 hp) form.

Launched in January 2007, Australian-market TwinTops came with the Z22YH 2.2 L direct-injection engine with a choice of 6-speed manual or 4-speed automatic transmission which was unique to Australia.

The folding roof assembly was built by Magna Steyr's Car Top Systems (CTS) subsidiary in Antwerp, Belgium, near the plant where the TwinTop was assembled. The TwinTop was discontinued in November 2010 along with the 3-door GTC, both replaced by the soft-top Opel Cascada.

==== Gallery ====
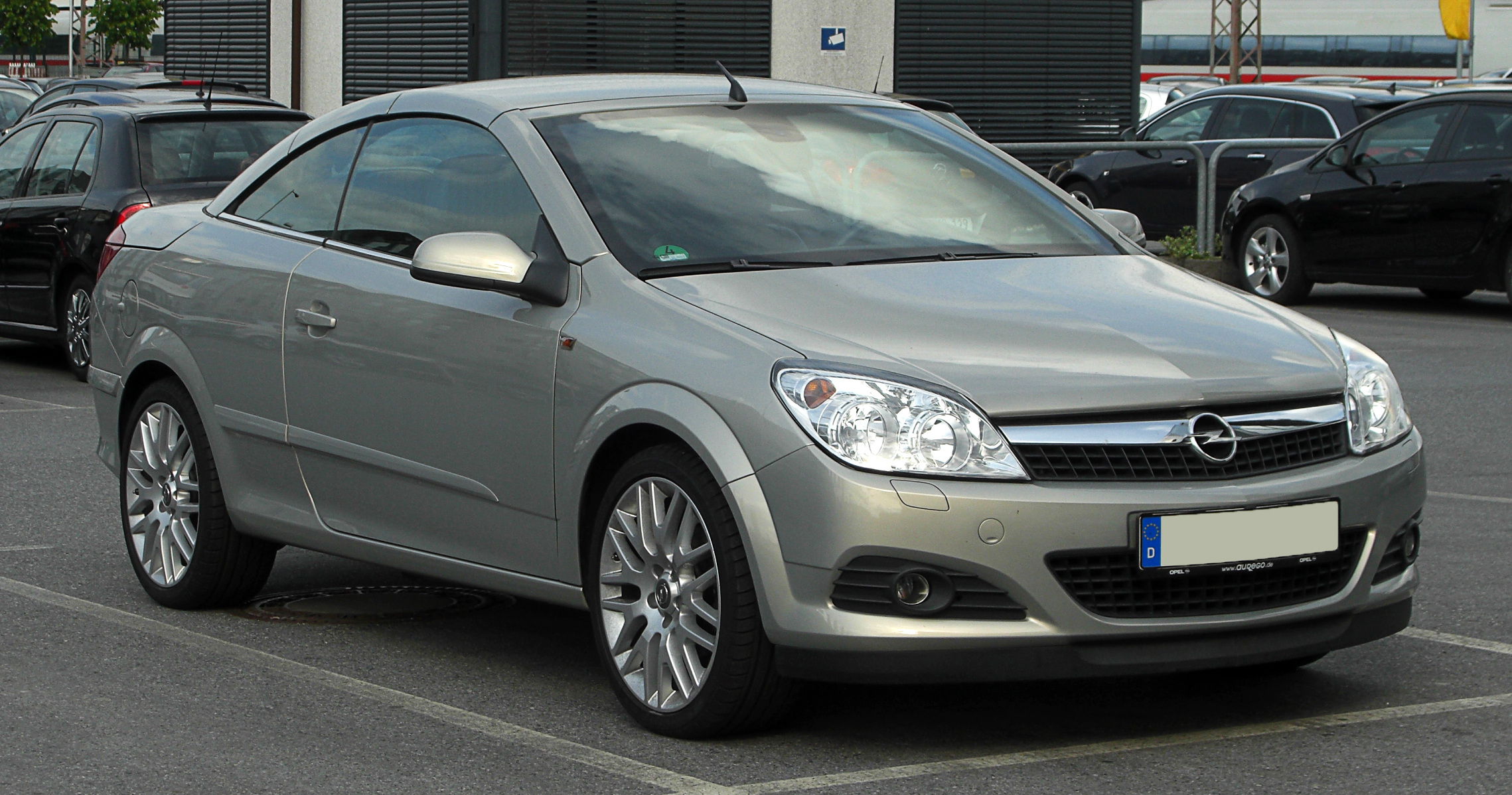
Opel Astra TwinTop

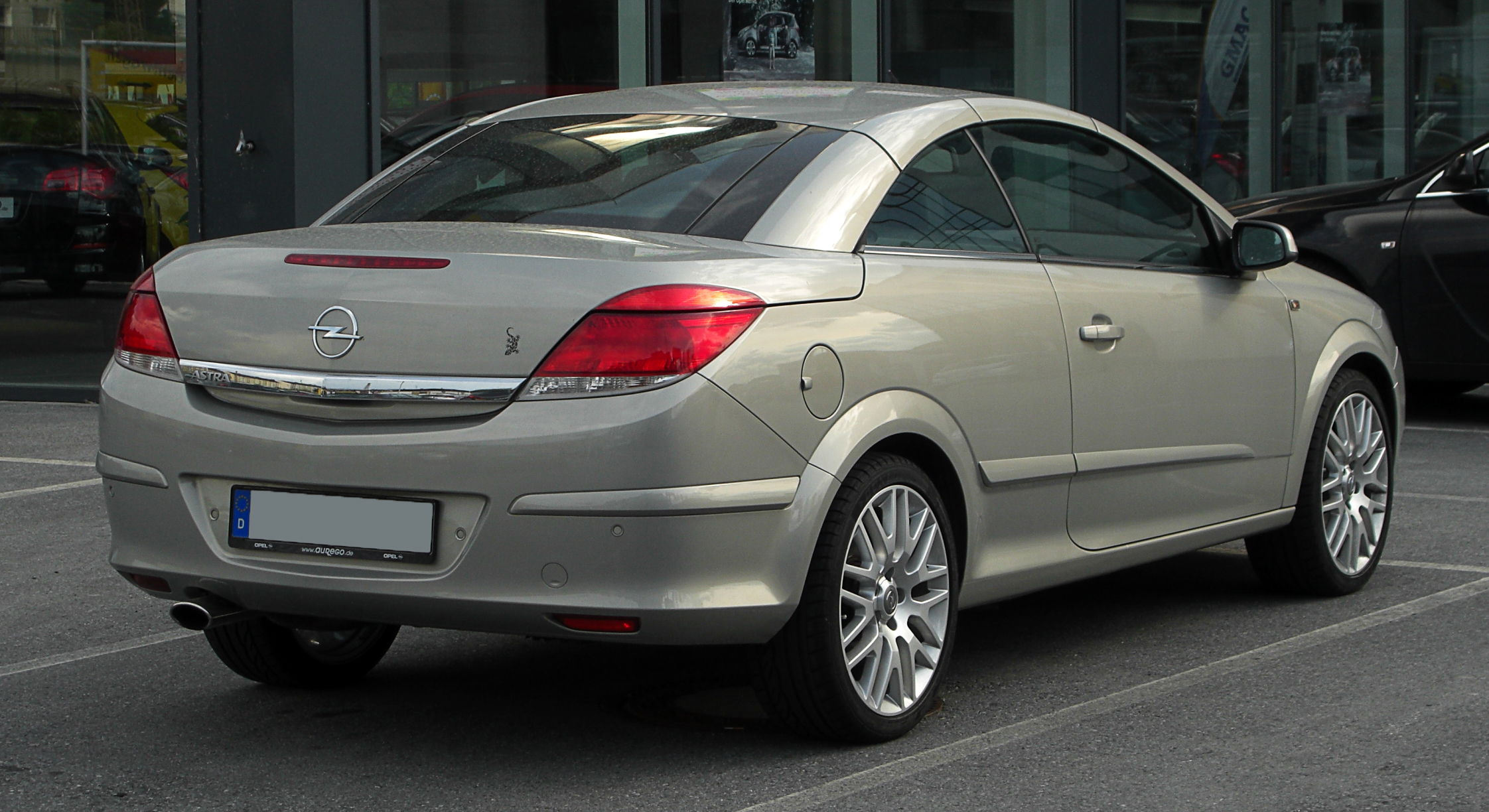
Opel Astra TwinTop (2007–2010)

=== Markets ===
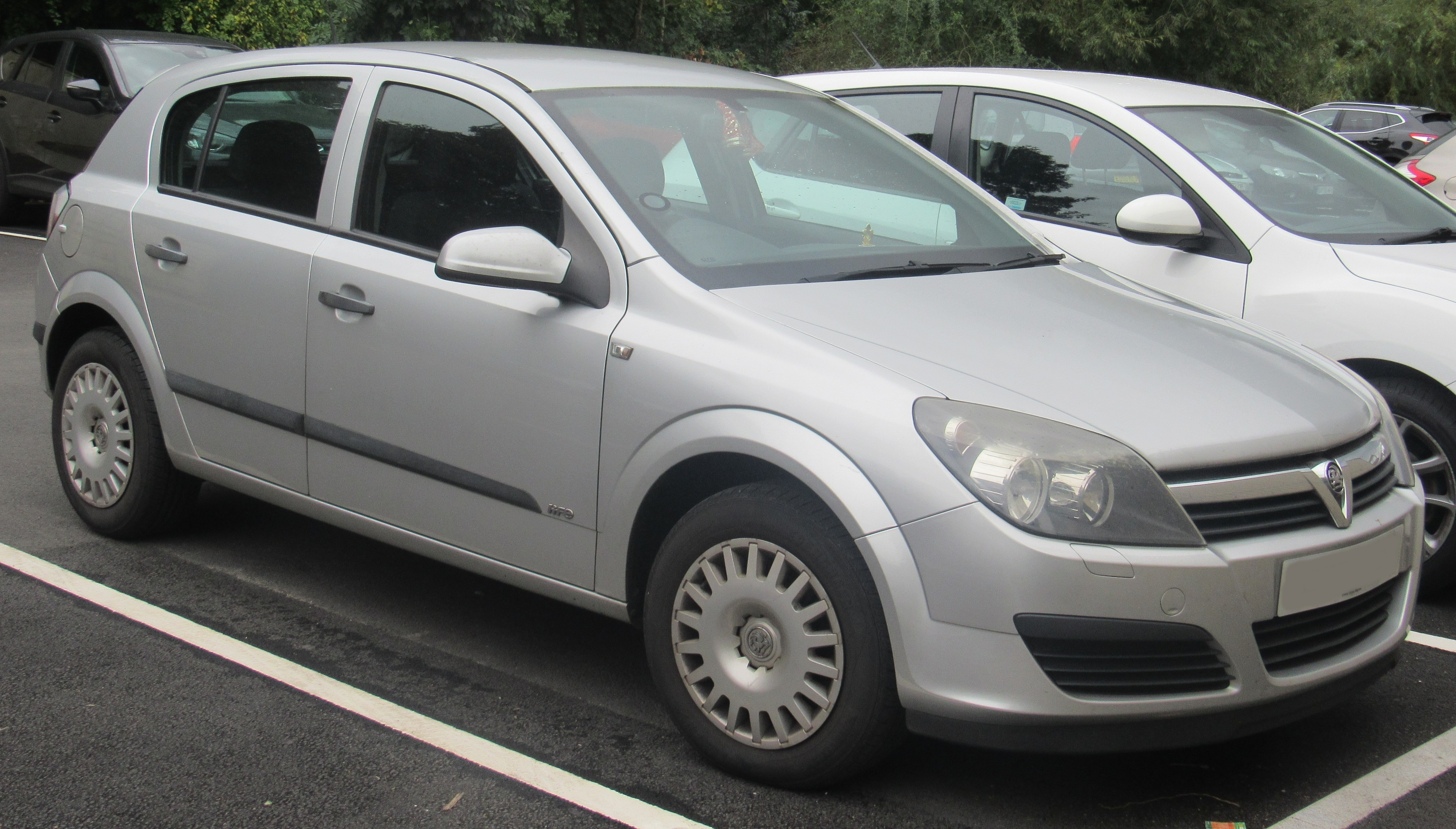
Vauxhall Astra Mk5 (United Kingdom)

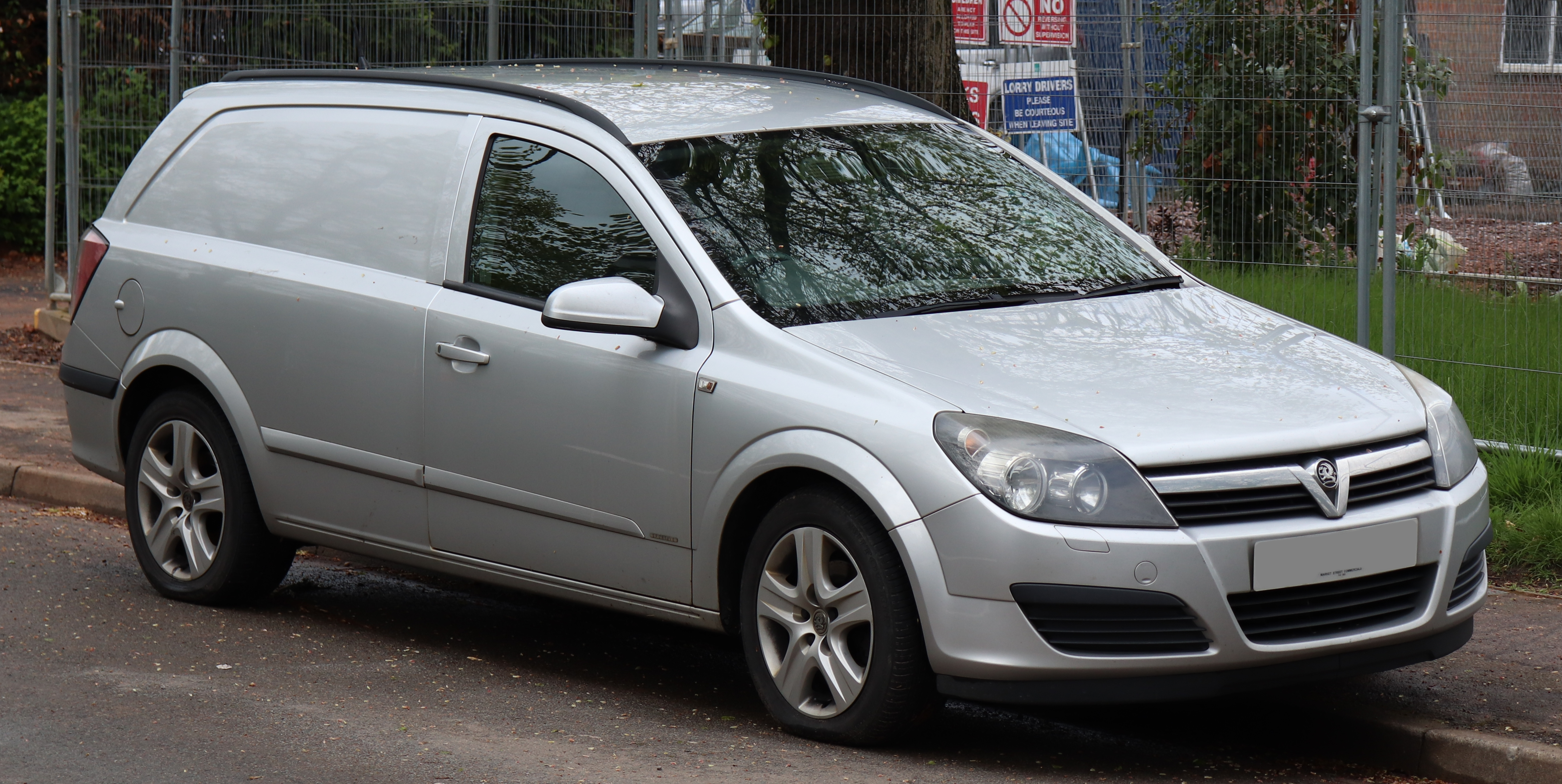
Vauxhall Astravan (MK5 United Kingdom)

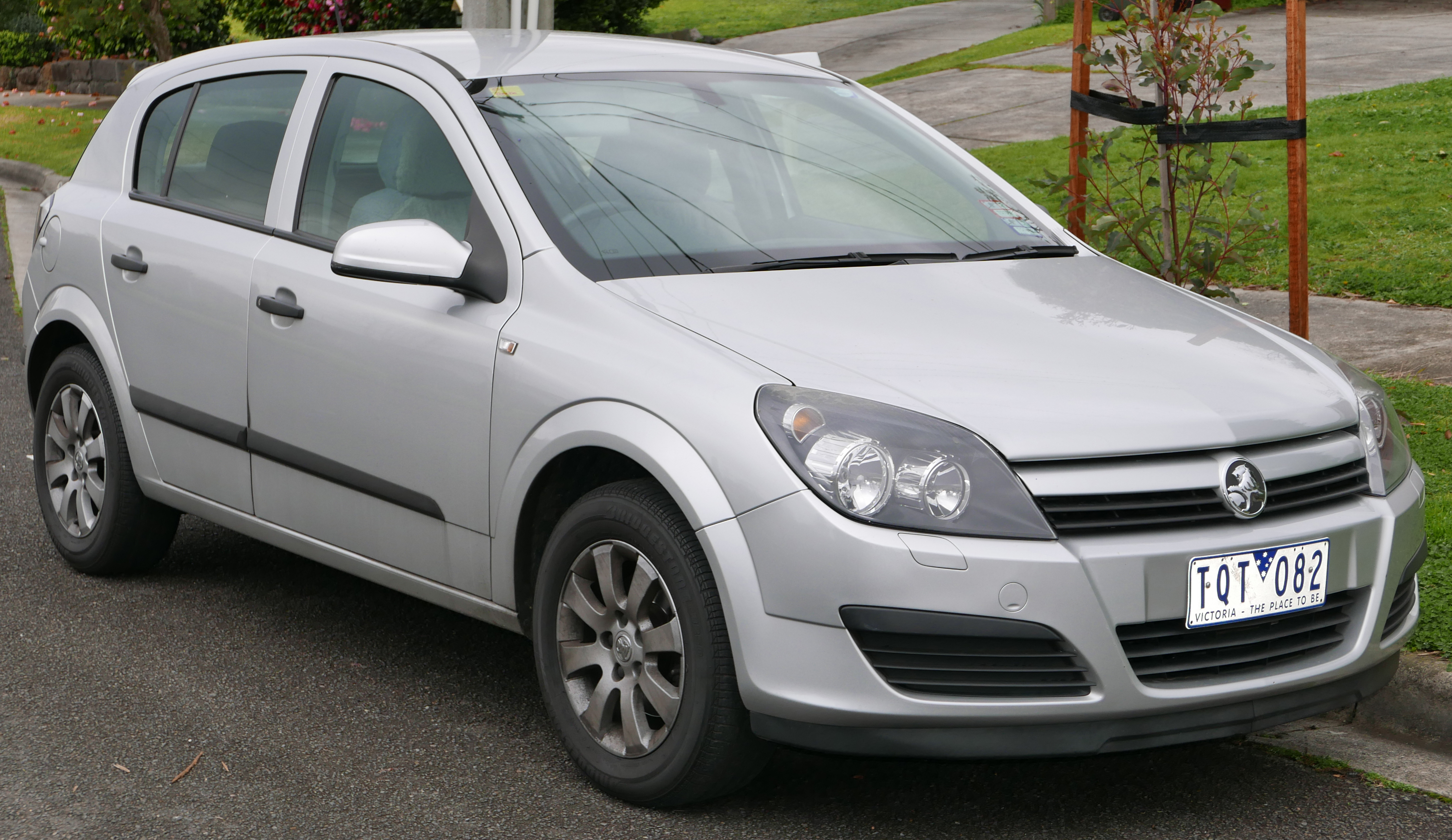
Holden Astra AH 5 door (Australia)

=== Stock Car Brazil ===
In Brazil, Chevrolet Vectra (Astra H) substituted the Chevrolet Astra on Stock Car. The V8 is still the same, apart from that which they use ethanol instead of petrol.

=== Saturn Astra ===
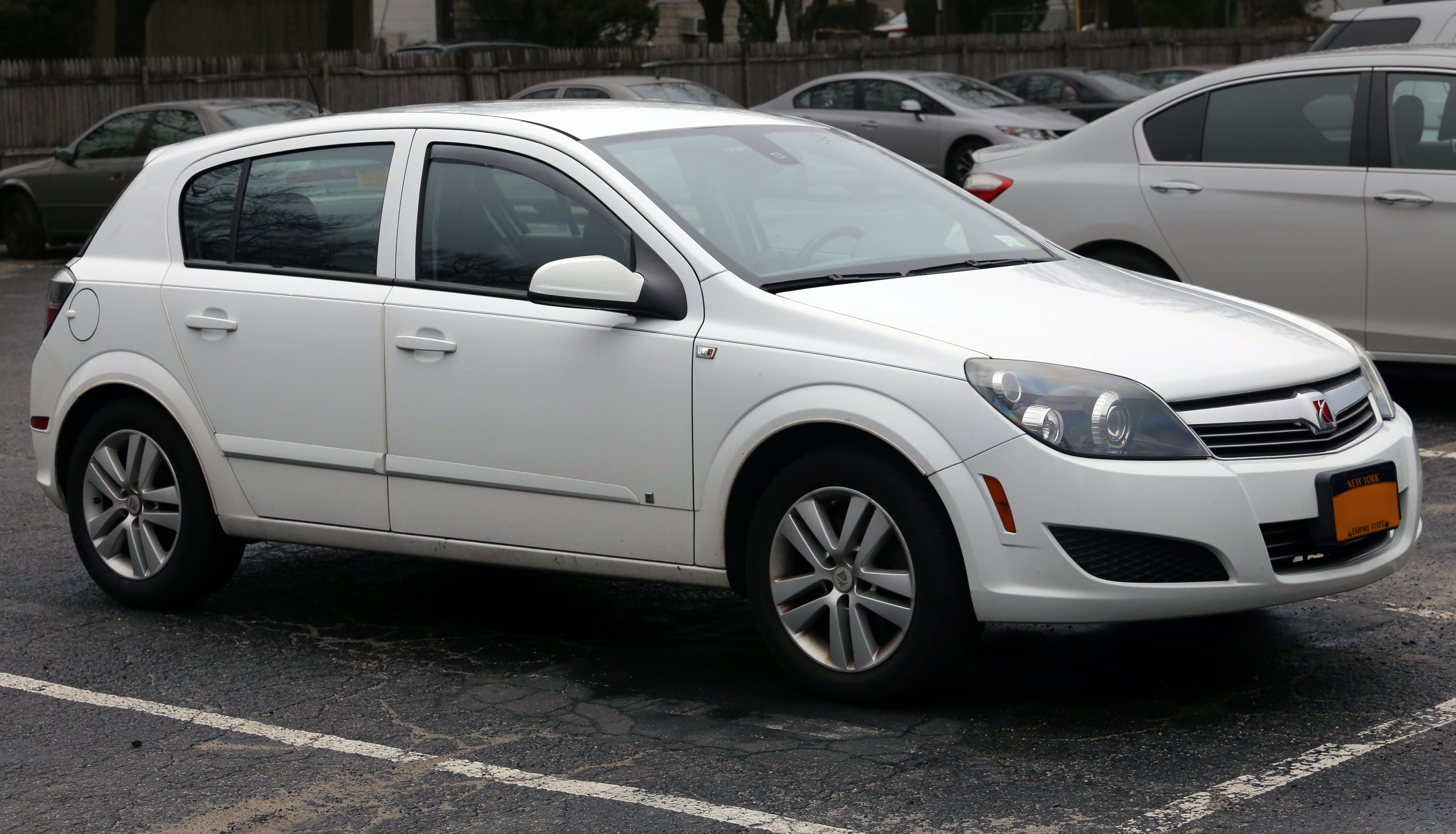
Saturn Astra XE 5-door

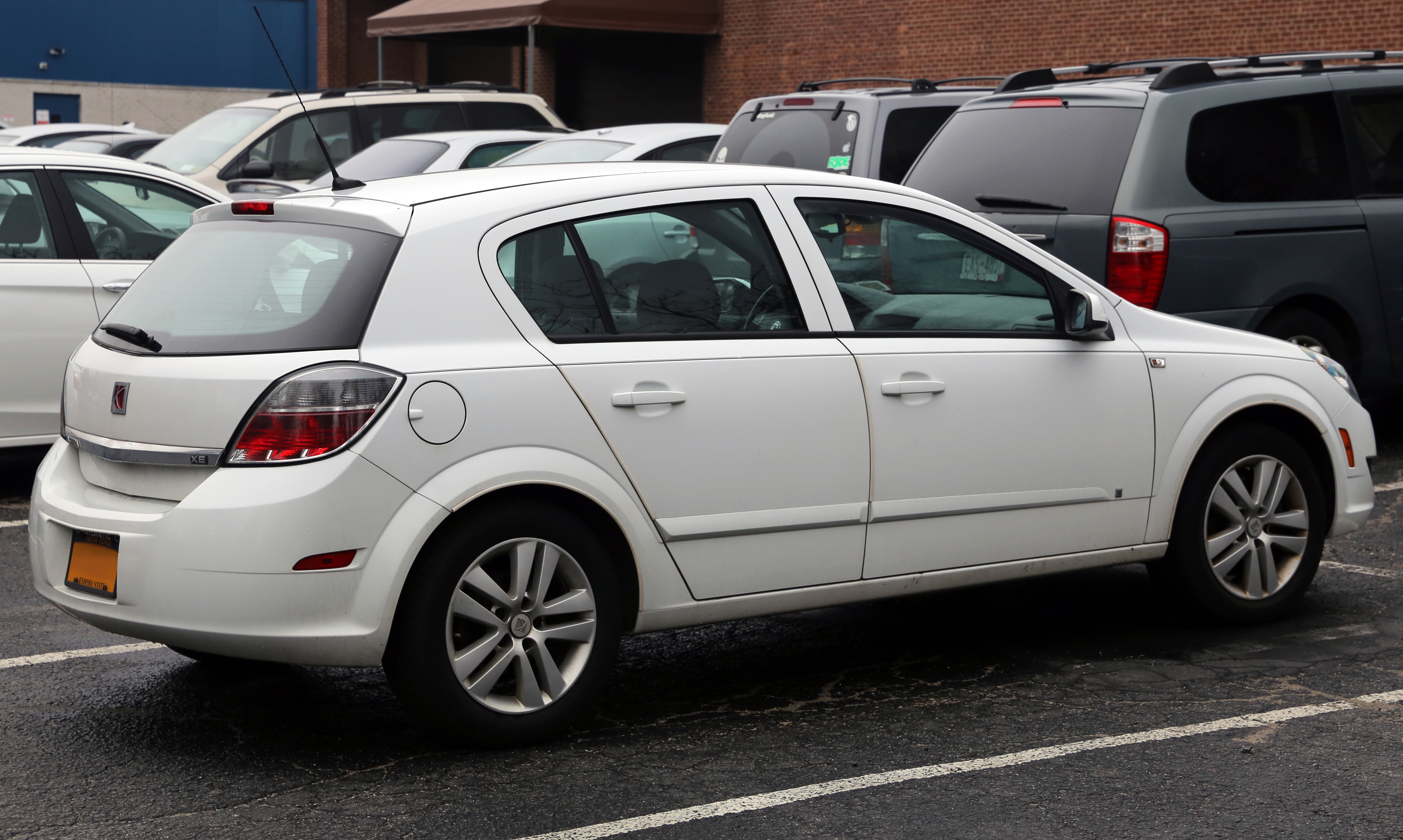
Saturn Astra XE 5-door (Rear)

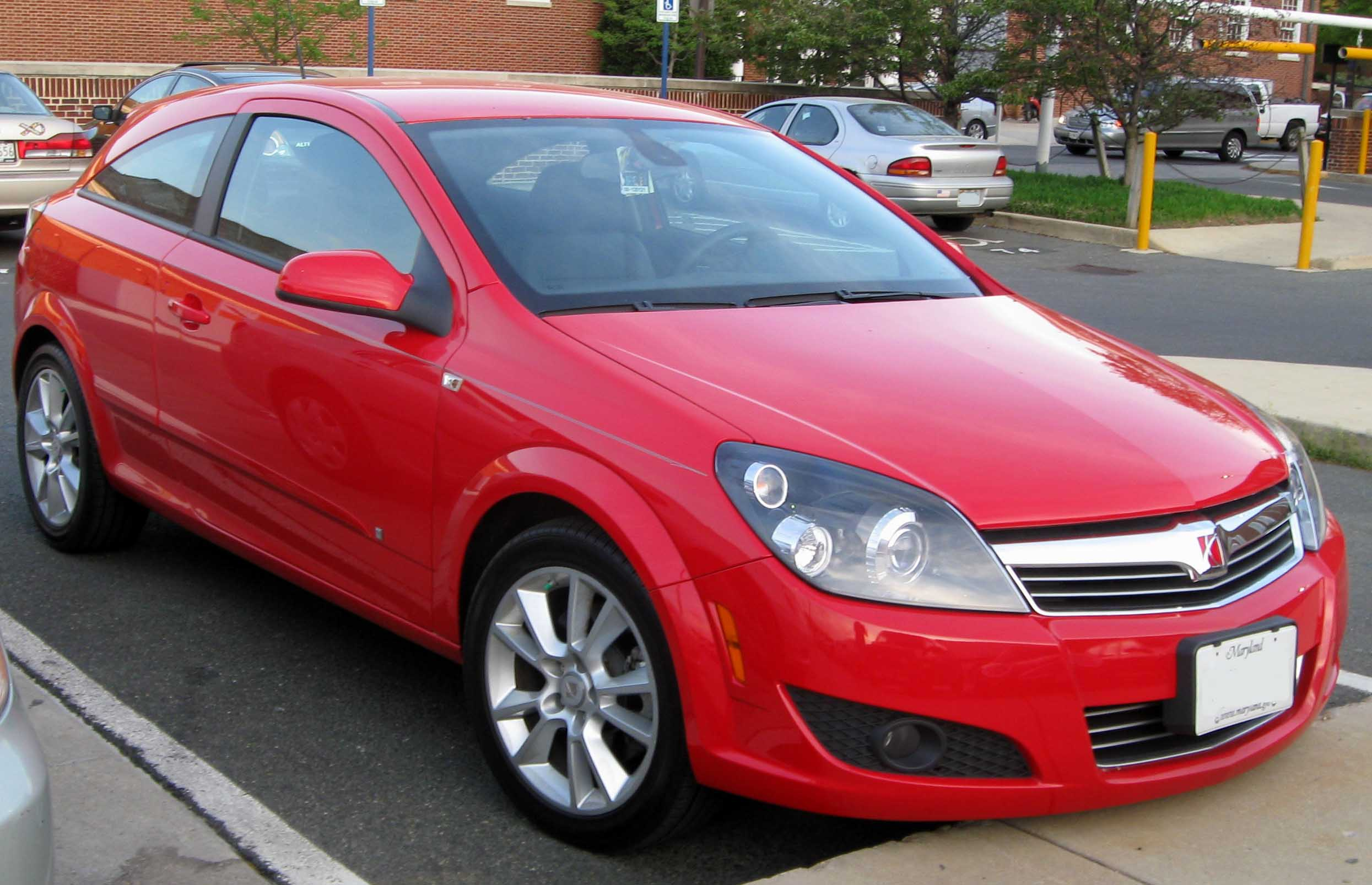
Saturn Astra 3-door

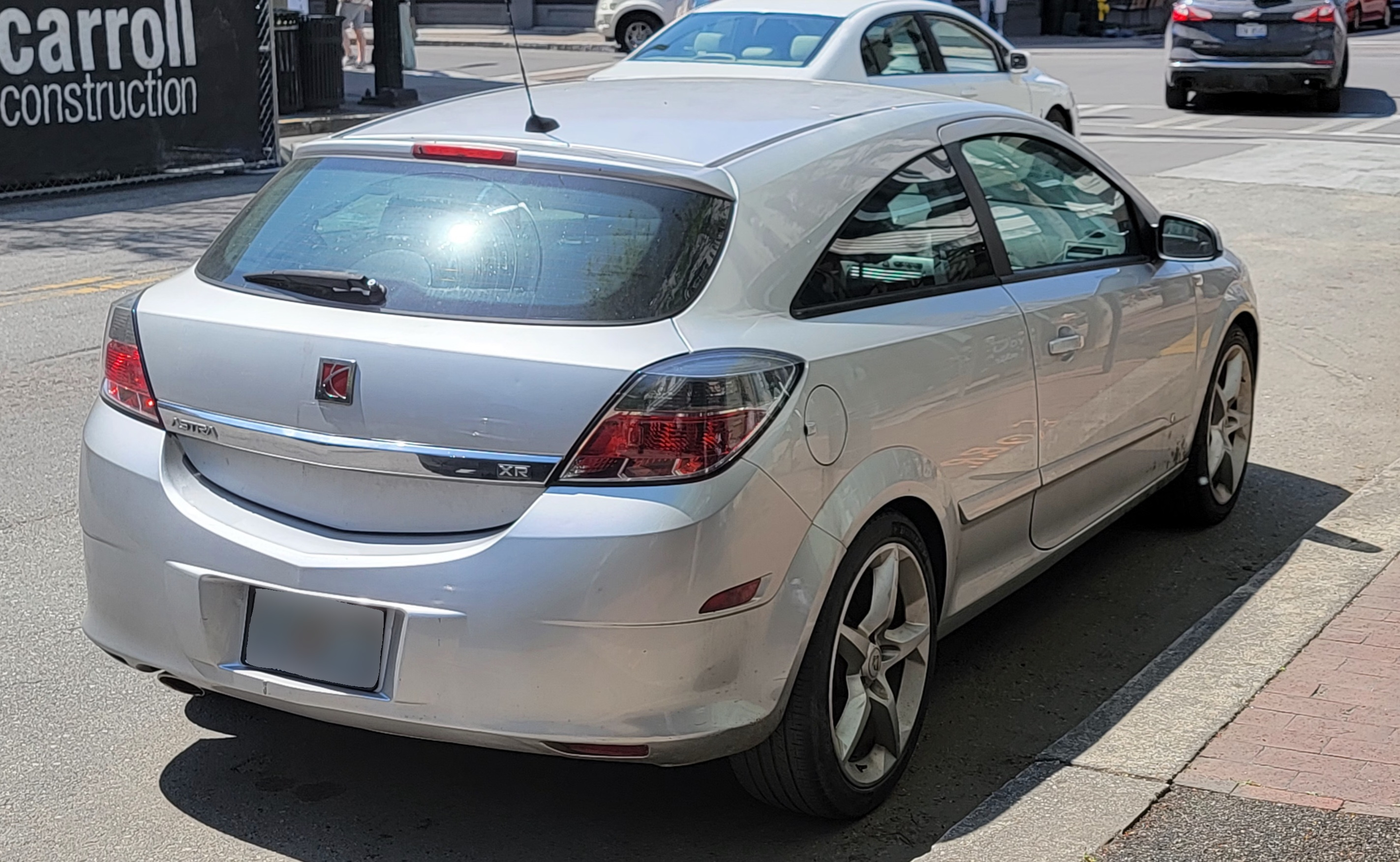
Saturn Astra 3-door (Rear)

The Saturn Astra was marketed in North America both the U.S and Canada after debuting at the 2007 Chicago Auto Show. Superseding the Ion, the Astra was a captive import, based on the Opel Astra, manufactured in Antwerp, Belgium.

Available in three and five-door hatchback body styles, sales began on 2 January 2008 with a single engine, a 1.8 L U18XER inline-4-cylinder petrol engine with variable-valve technology producing 138 hp (103 kW) — available five-speed manual transmission or a four-speed automatic transmission.

The XE base trim level was offered on the five-door hatchback and included steel wheels with plastic covers. The XR trim level was the only trim level for the 3-door and was available on five-door models — and included enhanced seat bolsters, driver lumbar and seat height adjusters; 17-inch alloy ten-spoke wheels and P225/45R17 all-season performance tires; easy Entry front sliding seats (3 door model) and enhanced instrument gauges.

Standard equipment included air conditioning (XR trim); cruise control; driver information centre including audio, time and outside temperature display; power door locks with central locking feature and remote keyless entry; courtesy lighting and dual reading lamps in front and rear; cloth front bucket reclining seats with adjustable active head restraints; easy entry front sliding seats (3 door); rear 60/40-split flat-folding seat with adjustable and removable head restraints and retractable; dual cupholders, driver 4-way and passenger 2-way manually adjustable seats; three-spoke steering wheel with rake and telescoping steering column; steering wheel-mounted audio and Driver Information Center controls; overhead sunglass storage; front seat illuminated vanity mirrors; power windows with express-Down; front console with cupholder and 12-volt power outlet; power-adjustable, manual folding, heated side mirrors; and rain sensing front intermittent windshield wipers.

An optional Premium Trim Package for XR models included leather seating surfaces, vinyl door trim, leather-wrapped steering wheel, driver manual lumbar seat adjuster, heated front seats, and interior ambient LED lighting. For 2008, an optional Sport Handling Package included stability control (marketed as StabiliTrak), lowered sport suspension, and quick-ratio power steering. This package was made standard on the 2009 3-door. A panoramic sunroof was available on 5-door models.

In Insurance Institute for Highway Safety (IIHS) crash tests the Astra earned a Good overall score in frontal impacts, while in side impacts it received a Marginal overall rating. Front and rear head curtain airbags and front seat-mounted torso airbags were standard, along with a system marketed as the Pedal Release System, whereby the clutch and or brake pedal would decouple in the event of a frontal crash with significant cowl intrusion, mitigating lower leg injury.

General Motors predicted sales of between 30,000 and 40,000 vehicles a year in the United States. Sales were slow, due initially to a large glut of unsold Ions and later the uncertainty surrounding the Saturn brand's future. In 2008 only 11,968 were sold in the US and in 2009 this fell to 6,298. In Canada the sales of the Saturn Astra was up to 11,605 in total between 2007 and 2010.

With a large number of unsold cars remaining on dealer lots, GM announced it would end import of the Astra. In June 2009, GM announced its intention to sell the Saturn Corporation to Penske Automotive Group. This never was concluded and in 2010 General Motors discontinued the Saturn brand.

The successor to the Saturn Astra in the North American General Motors lineup was the Buick Verano, introduced for the 2012 model year. The Verano is derived from the succeeding Astra J.

=== Engines ===
Engines were available with 5- and 6-speed manual transmission, Easytronic automated manual gearbox with 5-speeds, and also 4- and 6-speed automatic transmission. In the beginning there were petrol 1.4 90 PS, 1.6 105 PS, 1.8 125 PS and new 2.0 Turbo engine with two versions: 170 PS and 200 PS. Diesel lineup were 1.3 CDTI with 90 PS, 1.7 CDTI with 80 PS, 100 PS, and 1.9 CDTI engines with 120 and 150 PS. During production some engine got more power like 1.6, 1.8, 1.7, 1.9 and 2.0 Turbo with 240 PS was introduced in 2005 in OPC/VXR version. 1.3 CDTI 90 PS was introduced in 2005, replacing the 1.7 CDTI with 80 PS.

After restyle between the end of 2006 and beginning of 2007, new engines were introduced: 1.6 turbo engine with 180 PS that replaces 2.0 Turbo with 170, and 1.7 CDTI engine with 125 PS.

Petrol engines
Engine code	Engine	Displacement	Power	Torque	Note	CO_{2} emission (g/km)	Years
Z14XEL	I4	1364 cc	75 PS (55 kW; 74 hp) at 5200 rpm	120 N⋅m (89 lb⋅ft) at 3800 rpm	Austria only	151	2004–2010
Z14XEP	I4	1364 cc	90 PS (66 kW; 89 hp) at 5600 rpm	125 N⋅m (92 lb⋅ft) at 4000 rpm		146	2004–2010
Z16XEP	I4	1598 cc	105 PS (77 kW; 104 hp) at 6000 rpm	150 N⋅m (111 lb⋅ft) at 3900 rpm		146	2004–2007
Z16XER	I4	1598 cc	115 PS (85 kW; 113 hp) at 5500 rpm	155 N⋅m (114 lb⋅ft) at 4000 rpm		155	2006–2014
Z16LET	I4	1598 cc	180 PS (132 kW; 178 hp) at 5500 rpm	230 N⋅m (170 lb⋅ft) at 1980–5500 rpm	turbocharged	185	2006–2010
Z18XE	I4	1796 cc	125 PS (92 kW; 123 hp) at 5600 rpm	170 N⋅m (125 lb⋅ft) at 3800 rpm		185	2004–2006
Z18XER	I4	1796 cc	140 PS (103 kW; 138 hp) at 6300 rpm	175 N⋅m (129 lb⋅ft) at 3800 rpm		169	2006–2010
Z20LEL	I4	1998 cc	170 PS (125 kW; 168 hp) at 5200 rpm	250 N⋅m (184 lb⋅ft) at 1950–4000 rpm	turbocharged	216	2004–2006
Z20LER	I4	1998 cc	200 PS (147 kW; 197 hp) at 5400 rpm	262 N⋅m (193 lb⋅ft) at 4200 rpm	turbocharged	223	2004–2010
Z20LEH	I4	1998 cc	240 PS (177 kW; 237 hp) at 5600 rpm	320 N⋅m (236 lb⋅ft) at 2400–5600 rpm	VXR, OPC	221	2005–2010

Diesel engines
Model	Engine	Displacement	Power	Torque	Note	CO_{2} emission (g/km)	Years
1.3 CDTI	I4	1248 cc	90 PS (66 kW; 89 hp) at 3800 rpm	200 N⋅m (148 lb⋅ft) at 1700–2500 rpm		109	2005–2009
1.7 CDTI	I4	1686 cc	80 PS (59 kW; 79 hp) at 3800 rpm	170 N⋅m (125 lb⋅ft) at 1700–2500 rpm		119	2004–2005
1.7 CDTI	I4	1686 cc	100 PS (74 kW; 99 hp) at 4000 rpm	240 N⋅m (177 lb⋅ft) at 2300 rpm		138	2004–2010
1.7 CDTI	I4	1686 cc	110 PS (81 kW; 108 hp) at 4000 rpm	260 N⋅m (192 lb⋅ft) at 2300 rpm		138	2007–2014
1.7 CDTI	I4	1686 cc	125 PS (92 kW; 123 hp) at 4000 rpm	280 N⋅m (207 lb⋅ft) at 2300 rpm	0-100km/h for caravan. Auto: 10.5s; manual 9.8s with sport button	146	2007–2014
1.9 CDTI	I4	1910 cc	100 PS (74 kW; 99 hp) at 3500 rpm	260 N⋅m (192 lb⋅ft) at 1700–2500rpm		154	2005–2009
1.9 CDTI	I4	1910 cc	120 PS (88 kW; 118 hp) at 4000 rpm	280 N⋅m (207 lb⋅ft) at 2000–2750rpm		159	2004–2009
1.9 CDTI	I4	1910 cc	150 PS (110 kW; 148 hp) at 4000 rpm	320 N⋅m (236 lb⋅ft) at 2000-2750 rpm		159	2004–2009

=== Safety ===
Euro NCAP test results* Opel Astra 1.6 Enjoy (LHD) (2004)
Test	Score	Rating
Adult occupant:	34	5 /5 stars
Child occupant:	39	4 /5 stars
Pedestrian:	3	1 /4 stars

== Fourth generation (Astra J – P09; 2009) ==
Fourth generation (Astra J)
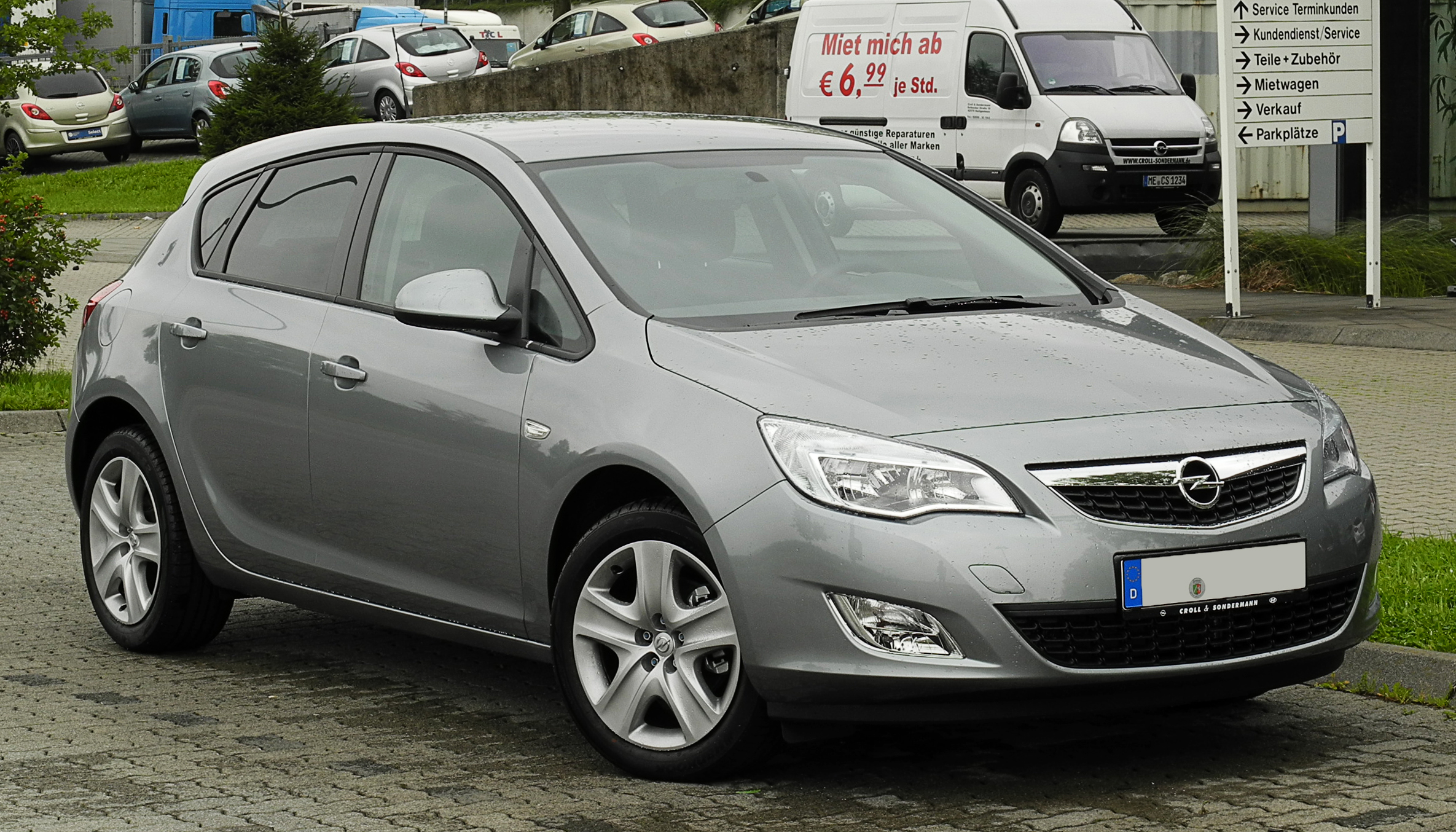
- Opel Astra J Hatchback pre-facelift (front; 5-door)

Overview
- Model code: P09
- Also called: Opel GTC (3-door, 2015–2018); Buick Excelle XT (China); Buick Verano (North America); Holden Astra (Australia and New Zealand); Vauxhall Astra (United Kingdom); Vauxhall GTC (3-door, 2015–2018)
- Production: 2009–2015; 2012–2018 (GTC and saloon)
- Assembly: Germany: Rüsselsheim (Opel Automobile GmbH); Poland: Gliwice; United Kingdom: Ellesmere Port; China: Yantai (SAIC-GM); Russia: St. Petersburg (GM Auto LLC)
- Designer: Uwe Müller

Body and chassis
- Body style: 3-door hatchback coupé (GTC); 5-door hatchback 4-door sedan / saloon 5-door wagon / estate (Sports Tourer)
- Platform: Delta II platform
- Related: Buick Verano; Chevrolet Cruze; Opel Cascada; Opel Zafira Tourer C Vauxhall Astra

Powertrain
- Engine: Petrol: 1.4 L Family 0 I4; 1.4 L Family 0 turbo I4; 1.6 L Family 1 I4; 1.6 L Family 1 turbo I4; 1.8 L Family 1 I4; 2.0 L Family II turbo I4; Diesel: 1.3 L Family B I4; 1.6 L MDE I4; 1.7 L Circle L I4; 2.0 L Family B I4
- Transmission: 5-speed manual 6-speed manual 6-speed automatic

Dimensions
- Wheelbase: 2,685 mm (105.7 in); 3-door GTC: 2,695 mm (106.1 in)
- Length: 5-door hatch: 4,419 mm (174.0 in); 3-door GTC: 4,466 mm (175.8 in); Sedan: 4,658 mm (183.4 in); Wagon: 4,698 mm (185.0 in)
- Width: 1,814 mm (71.4 in); 3-door GTC: 1,840 mm (72.4 in)
- Height: 5-door hatch: 1,510 mm (59.4 in); 3-door GTC: 1,482 mm (58.3 in); Sedan: 1,500 mm (59.1 in); Wagon: 1,535 mm (60.4 in)

Chronology
- Successor: Citroën C4 X (sedan); DS 4 (GTC); Opel Mokka GSe (OPC)

The Astra J is based on the General Motors' Delta II platform, debuted at the 2009 Frankfurt Motor Show in Germany and went on sale in November 2009 as a 2010 model while the 2009 model year was entirely skipped. The car has taken most of its styling from the new Opel Insignia, with many of the higher options fitted as standard. Full production came on line at Vauxhall's Ellesmere Port Plant at the end of September 2009. Deliveries began in December 2009. Referred to as the "Astra I", it officially received the "Astra J" name instead to avoid confusing the letter I for the number 1.

The Astra was developed at Opel's 'International Technical Development Center' (ITDC) in Rüsselsheim and continues Opel's design language, ‘sculptural artistry meets German precision’ first introduced on the Insignia. The Astra features a torsion beam rear suspension with Watt's link. Infotainment and car navigation systems are supplied by Bosch.

The Opel Astra came third in the European Car of the Year award in 2010.

The station wagon version of the Astra - dubbed the 'Sports Tourer' by Opel, debuted at the 2010 Paris Motor Show, and went on sale shortly afterwards, with four trim levels: ES, Exclusiv, SRI and SE. The adoption of the "Sports Tourer" name finally brought to an end Opel's traditional "Caravan" designation for its station wagon derivatives.

The pre-facelift Astra J was briefly sold in Australia under the Opel brand, with its introduction into the Australian market in 2012. However, the Opel brand and nameplate subsequently pulled out of the Australian market in 2013 due to poor sales, and later versions of the Astra J, namely the OPC and GTC variant, were sold under the Holden brand name from 2013 onwards.

Shanghai GM launched the Chinese version of the Opel Astra hatchback, which is badged as the Buick Excelle XT. This car went on sale in January 2010. Three engines were announced: Ecotec D-VVT 1.6 L, 1.8 L and 1.6 L Turbo.

The saloon version of the Astra was first presented at the 2012 Moscow International Automobile Salon. The 4-door saloon has a number of names depending on market: Buick Excelle GT in China, Buick Verano in North America and Opel Astra sedan/saloon elsewhere. This version is not sold in the United Kingdom, although it is available in some other right hand drive markets, such as Ireland (as the: Astra Saloon), Malta, and South Africa. Production for the saloon version continued until 2018 after the Astra K was released to supply several markets where saloons are popular, including Turkey.

=== Gallery ===
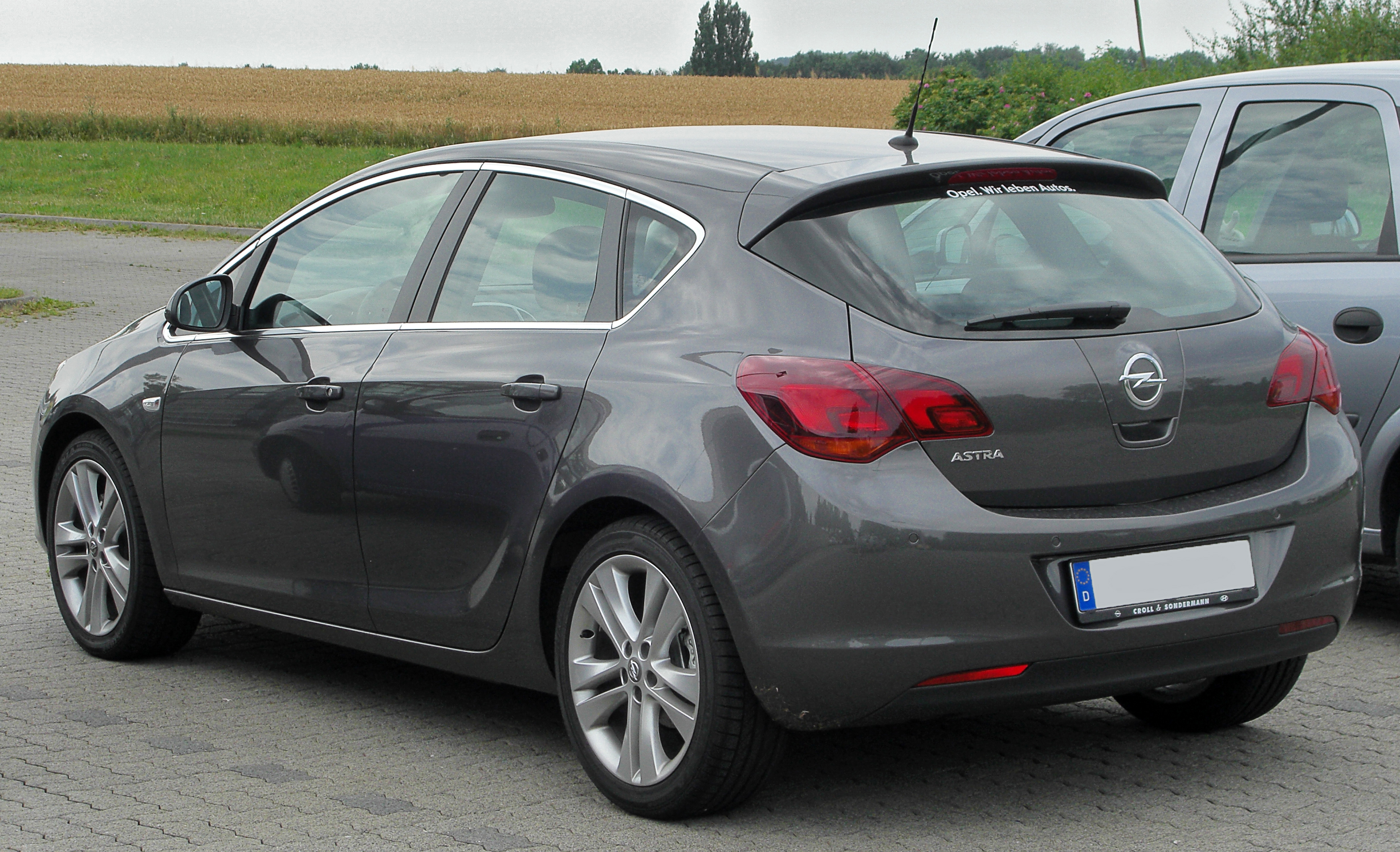
5-door hatchback

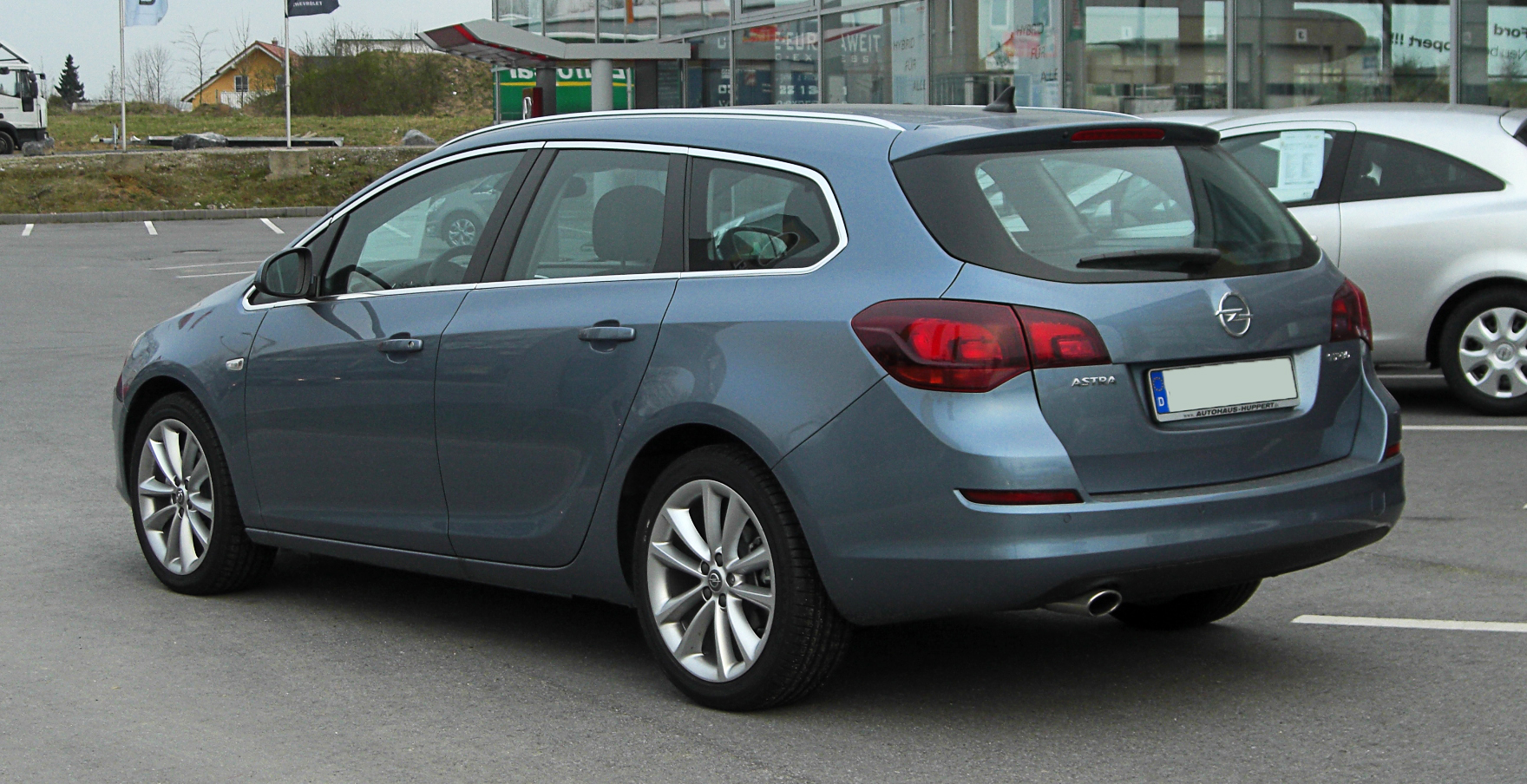
Sports Tourer

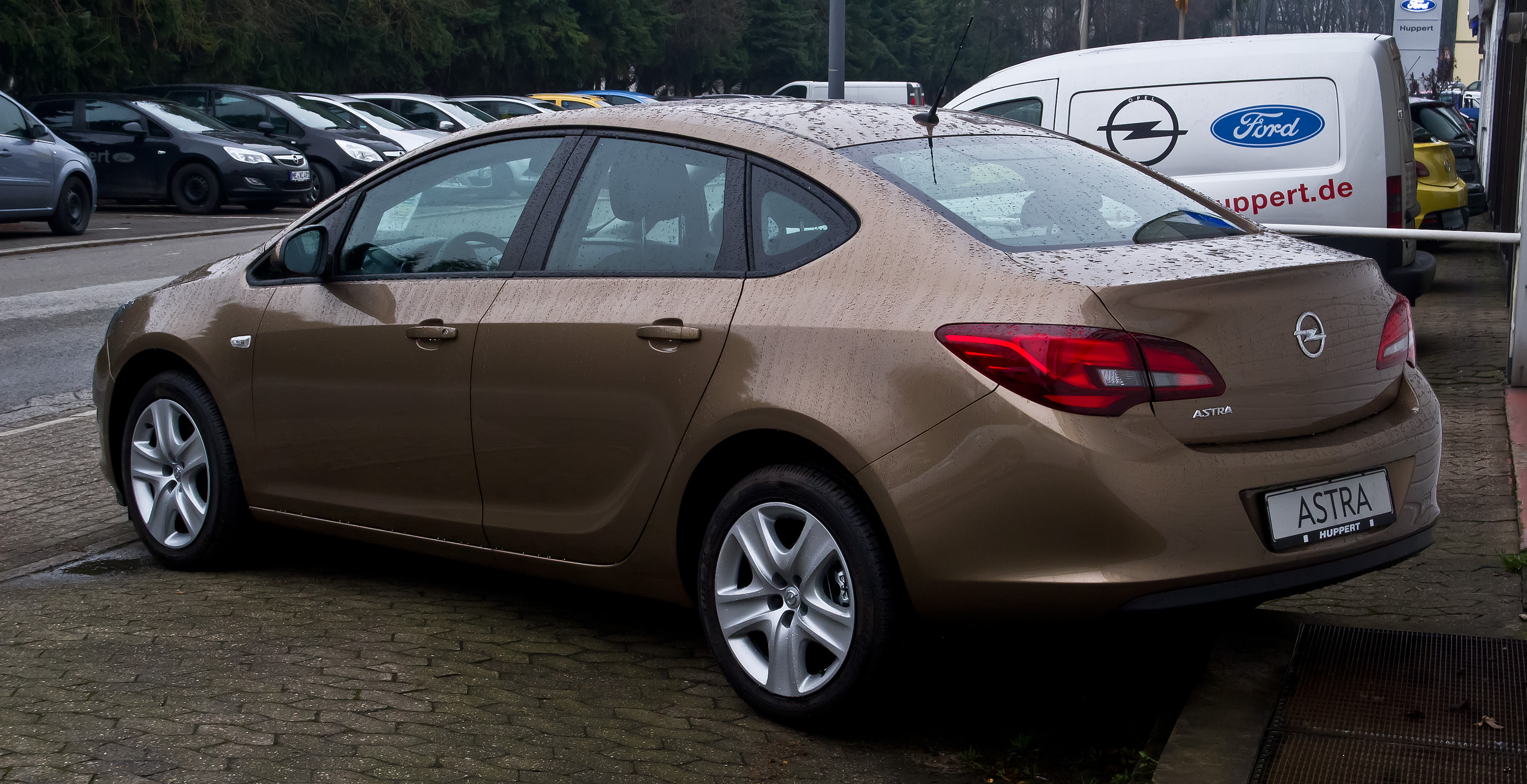
4-door saloon

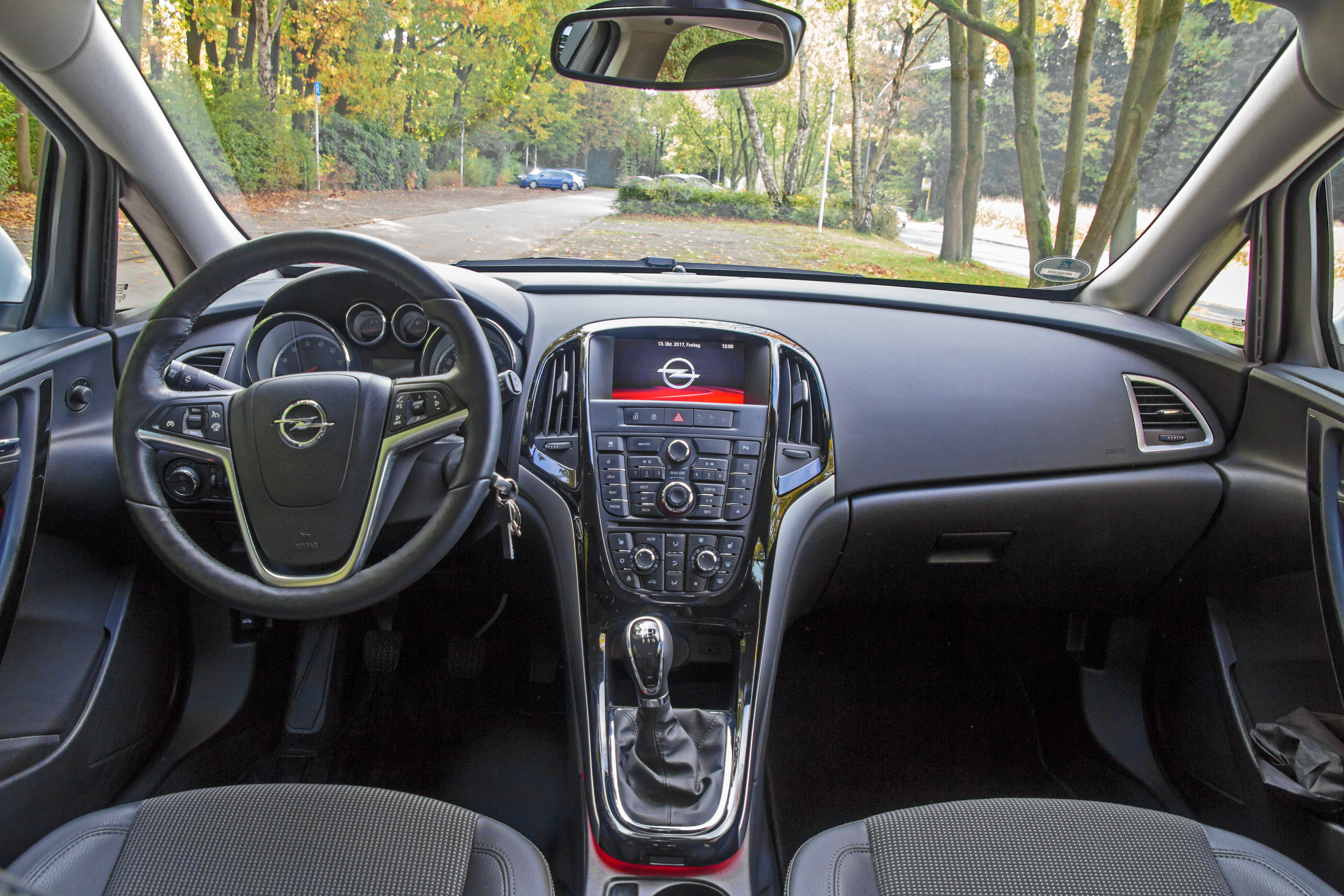
Interior

=== GTC ===
A 3-door version dubbed Astra GTC was introduced in July 2011. Externally, it retains very few design elements of the old 5-door model. It has a sportier appearance, with a much more 'sculpted' chassis. It features a HiPerStrut front suspension from the Opel Insignia OPC which helps alleviate torque steering. Rear suspension uses a Watt's linkage to minimize lateral movement of the axle. The wheelbase is enhanced to accommodate wider low-profile tyres. Similarly to the Astra H GTC, a 'panoramic windscreen' option is available. The Astra GTC was awarded a 5 star rating for its performance under Euro NCAP safety tests. In late 2013, a new 1.6 Turbo EcoTec engine with 200PS output replaced the older 180PS engine of the same capacity, meaning the 1.6 Turbo replaces the BiTurbo Diesel as the fastest non-OPC model in the range.

The GTC is built in Gliwice, Poland, with a range of models & petrol and diesel engines. In the UK, the GTC includes the SRi and VXR models. Production continued alongside the Astra K when it was introduced in 2015, and concurrently dropped the Astra moniker for simply GTC. In 2018, the model was discontinued.

==== Models and colours ====
There are three models of the GTC, Sport, the SRi, Limited Edition, and the VXR model. Available colours are Power red (Solid), the Brilliant colours are Summit white & Flaming yellow, The Metallic colours are Granite grey, Deep sky blue, Carbon flash, Sovereign silver & Flip chip silver, The Pearlescent colours are Emerald green & Asteroid grey. The VXR also has Flash blue.

==== Gallery ====
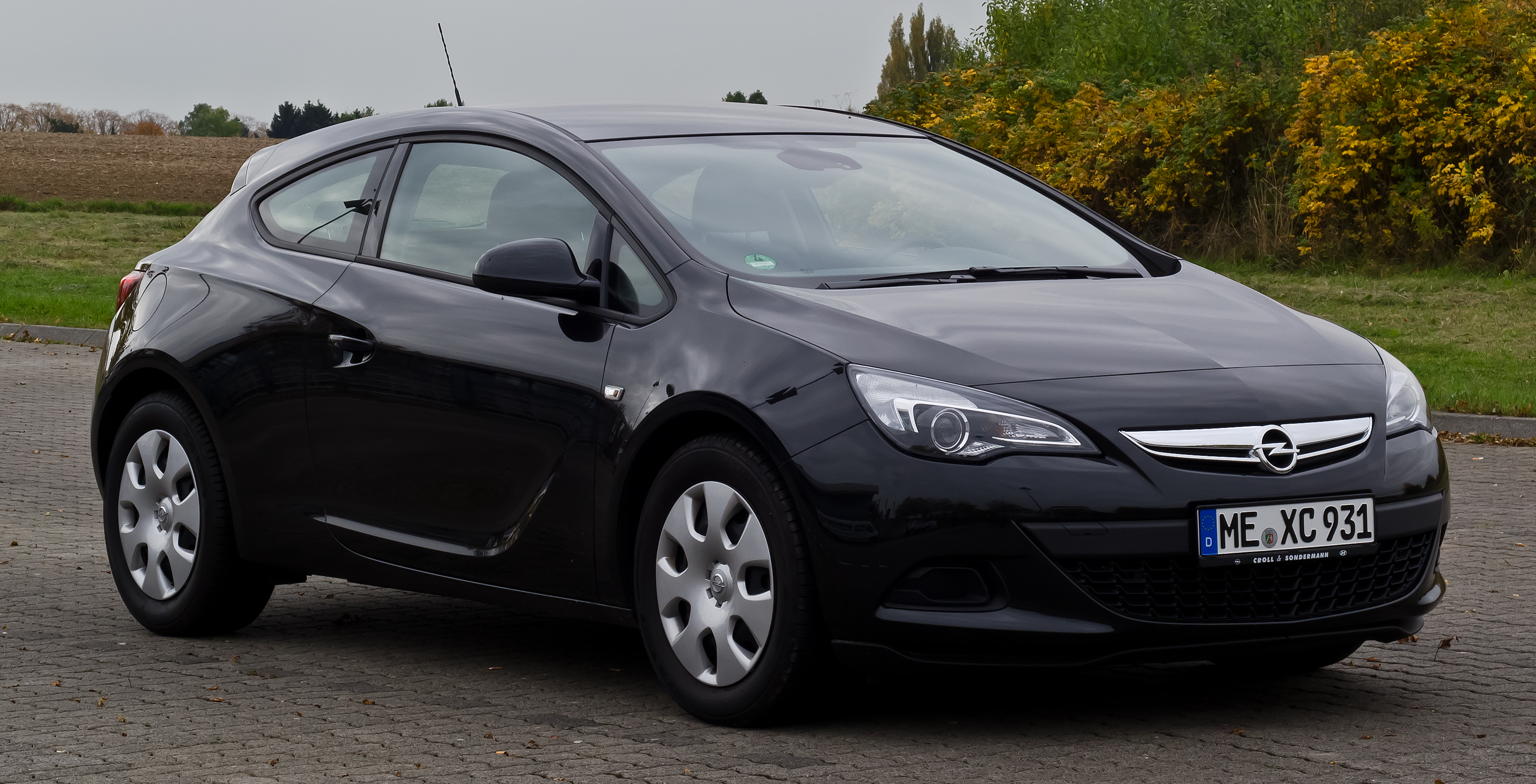
Opel Astra J GTC

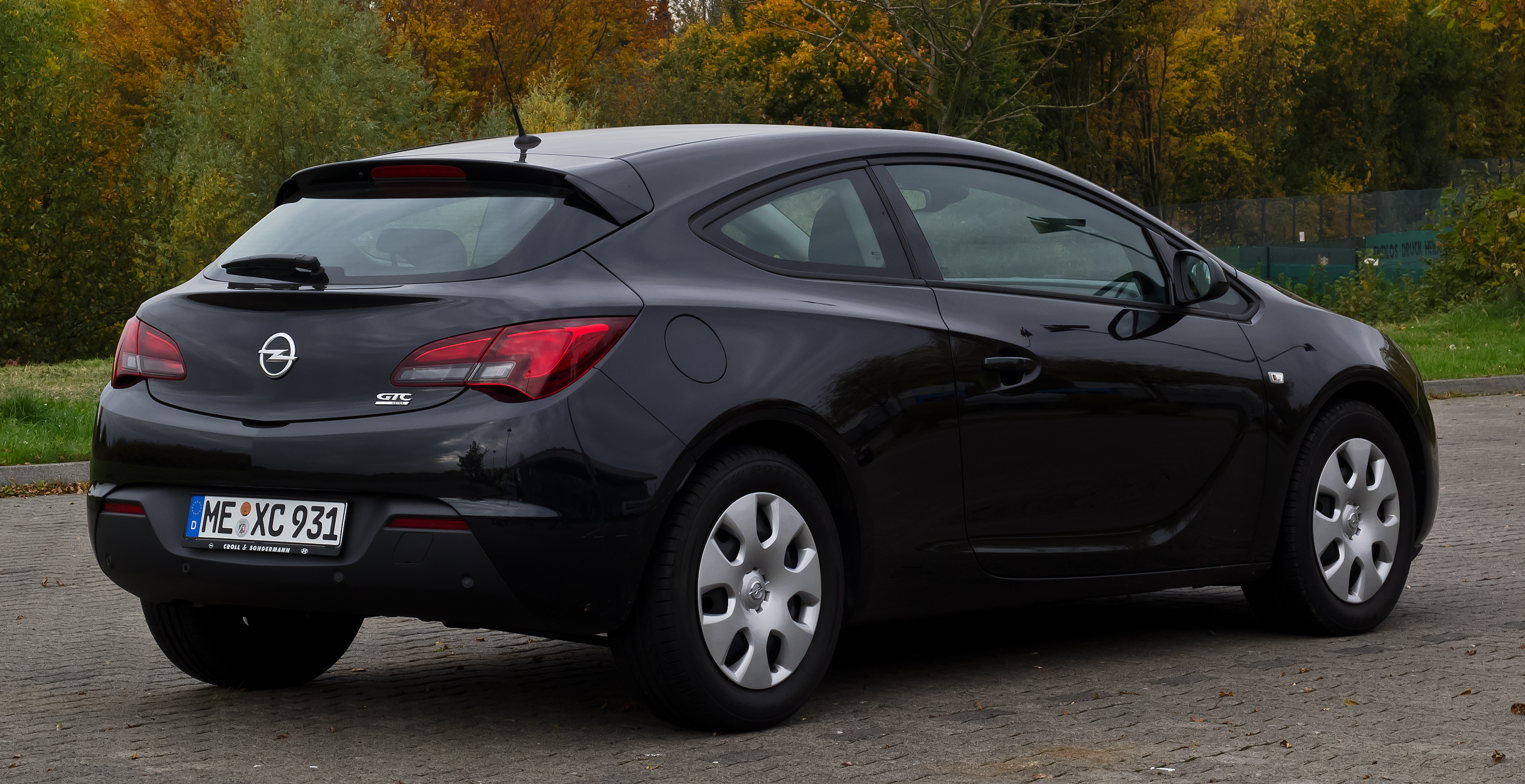
Opel Astra J GTC

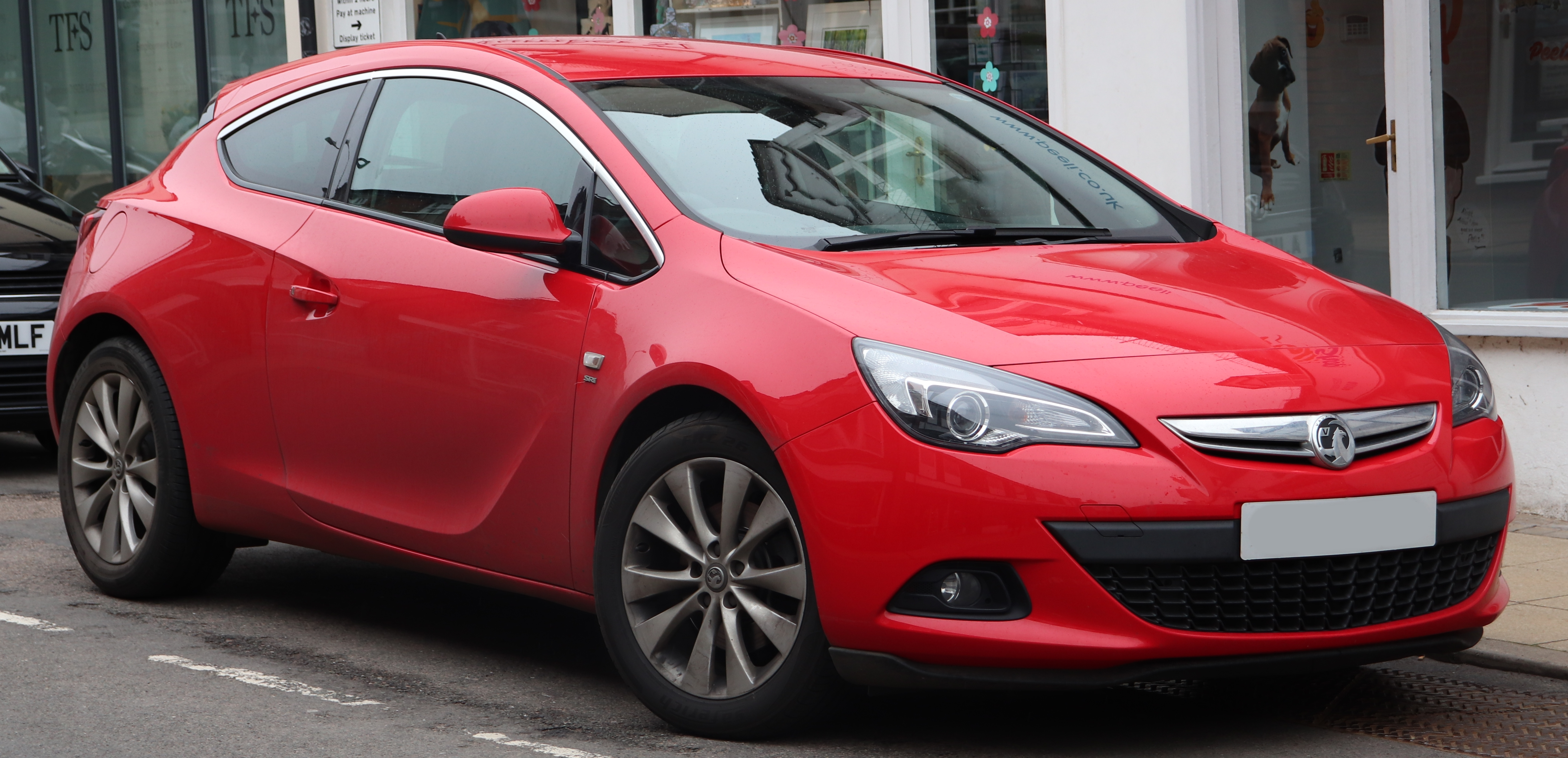
Vauxhall Astra Mk6 GTC

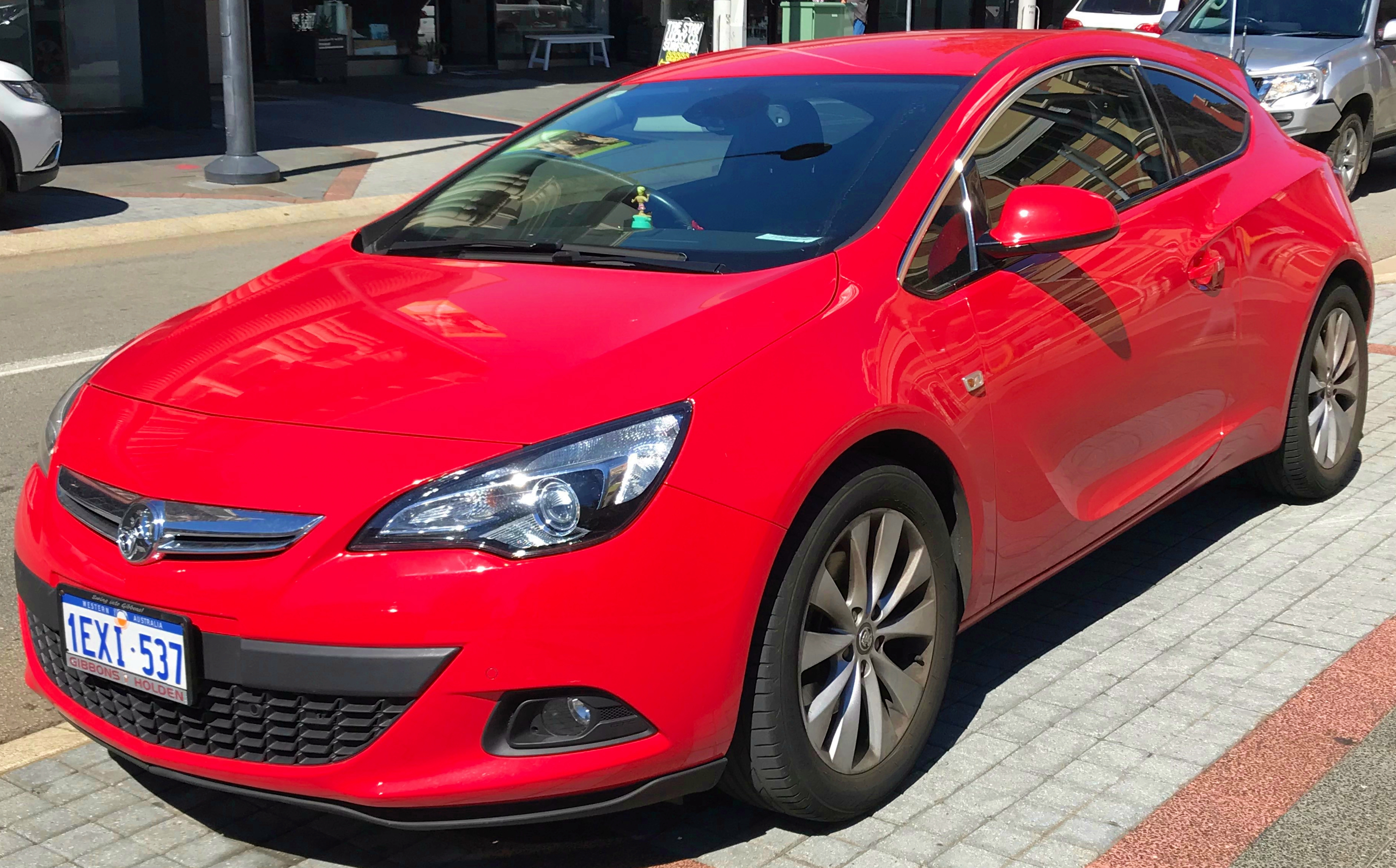
Holden Astra GTC

=== OPC ===
The OPC trim of the Astra GTC has been available since 2012. This car features a turbocharged 2.0 L direct injection engine with a power of 206 kW (280 PS; 276 hp) and torque of 400 N⋅m (295 lbf⋅ft), HiPerStrut front suspension, a mechanical limited-slip differential, an electronically-controlled FlexRide active suspension, and Recaro-style sport seats, OPC badged gear knob, steering wheel, and instrument dials as well as distinctive front and rear bumper, rear standard spoiler as well as an optional OPC spoiler compared to GTC version. It comes with 19-inch alloy wheels as standard and optional 20-inch alloy wheels which are lighter than the 19-inch version. The 0 to 100 km/h (62 mph) time is 6 seconds and top speed is limited to 250 km/h (155 mph).

==== Gallery ====
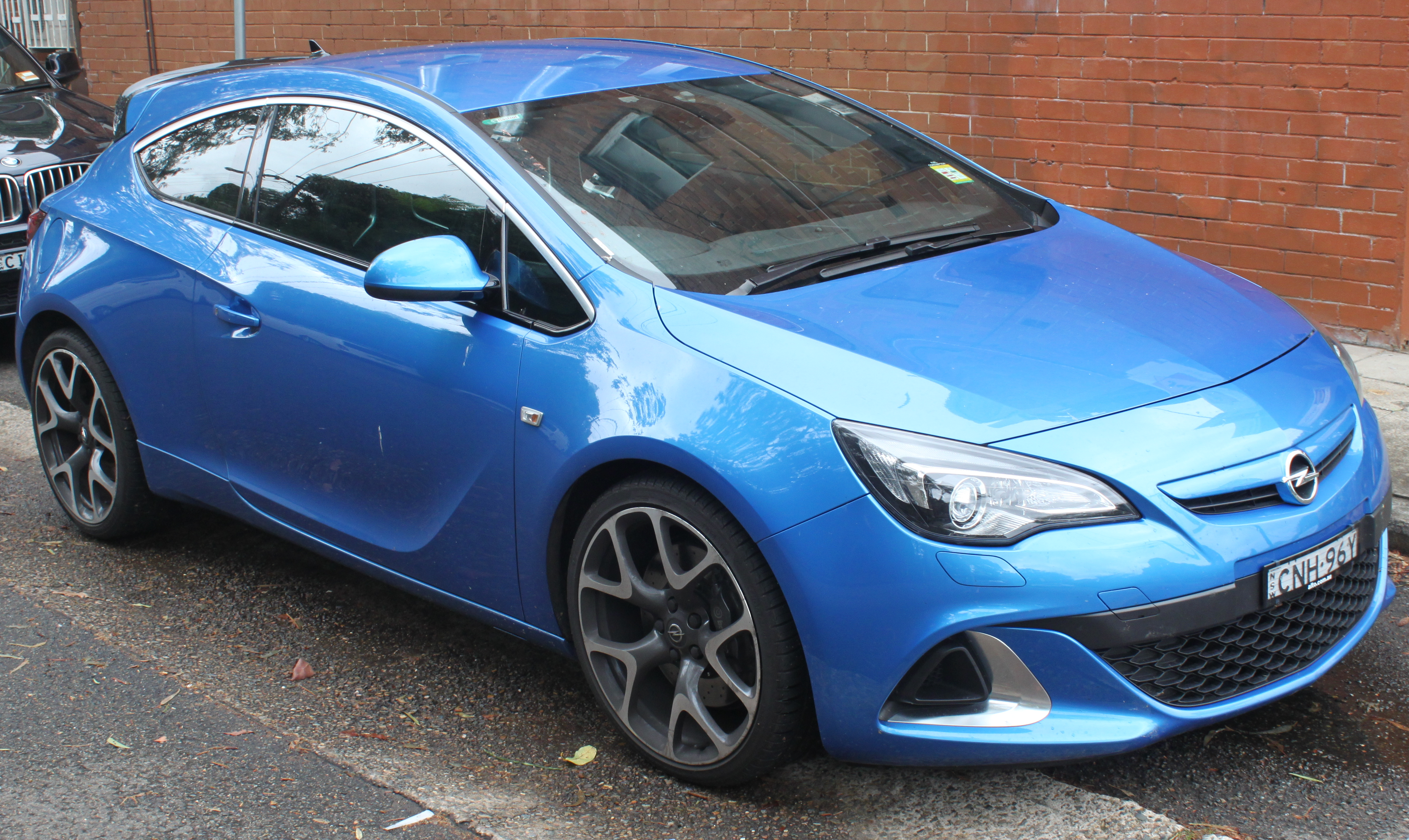
Opel Astra J OPC

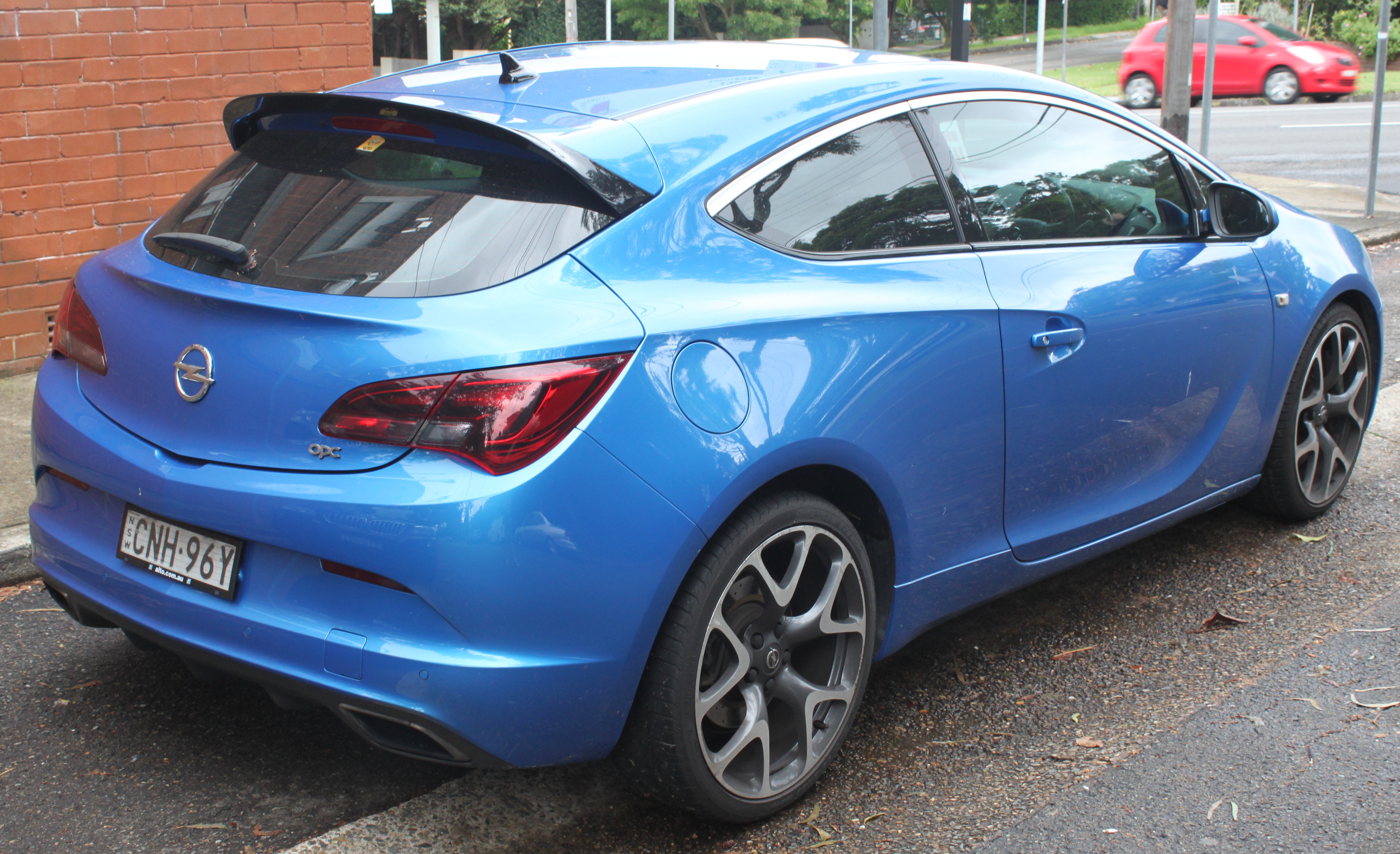
Rear view

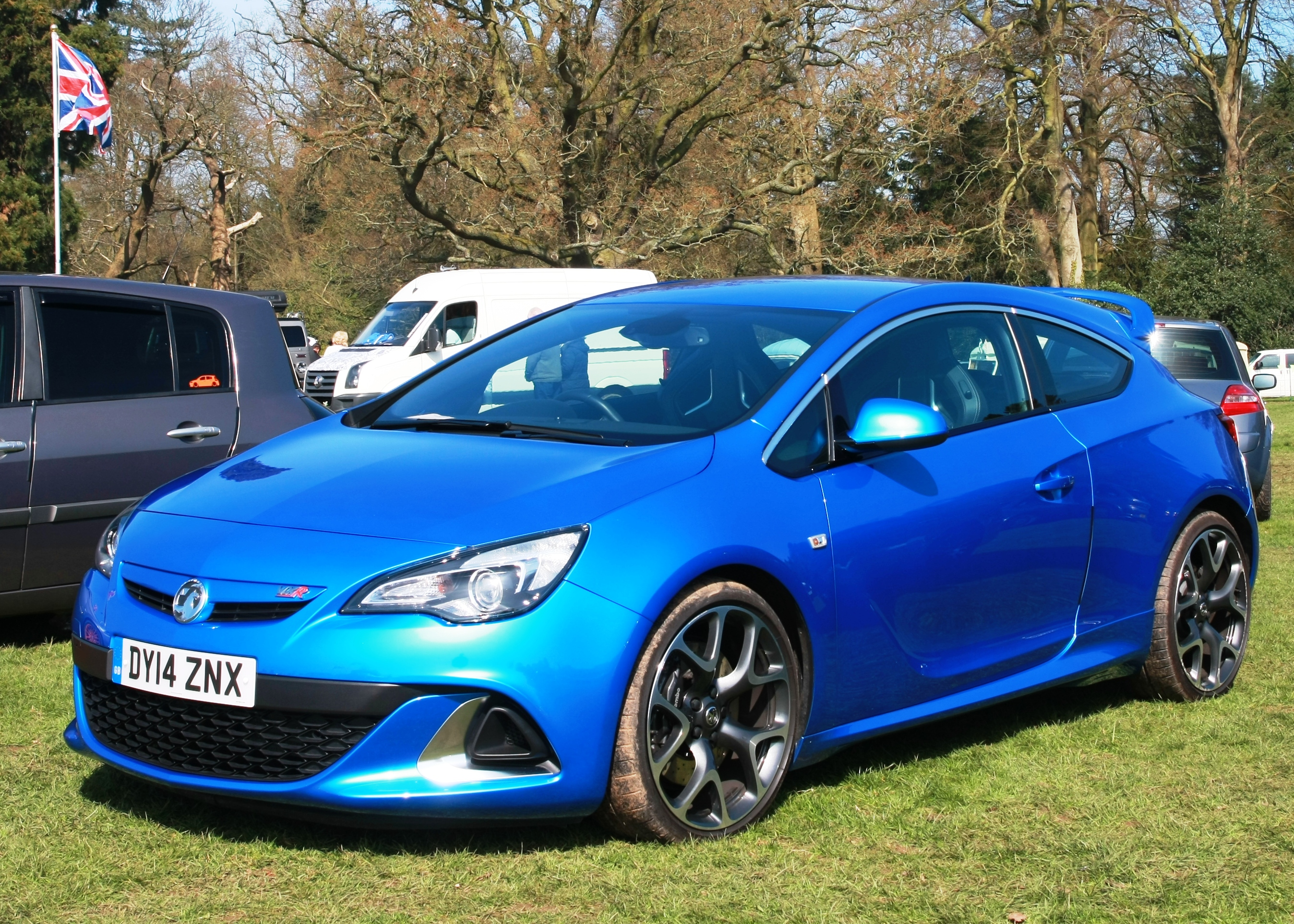
Vauxhall Astra VXR for UK market

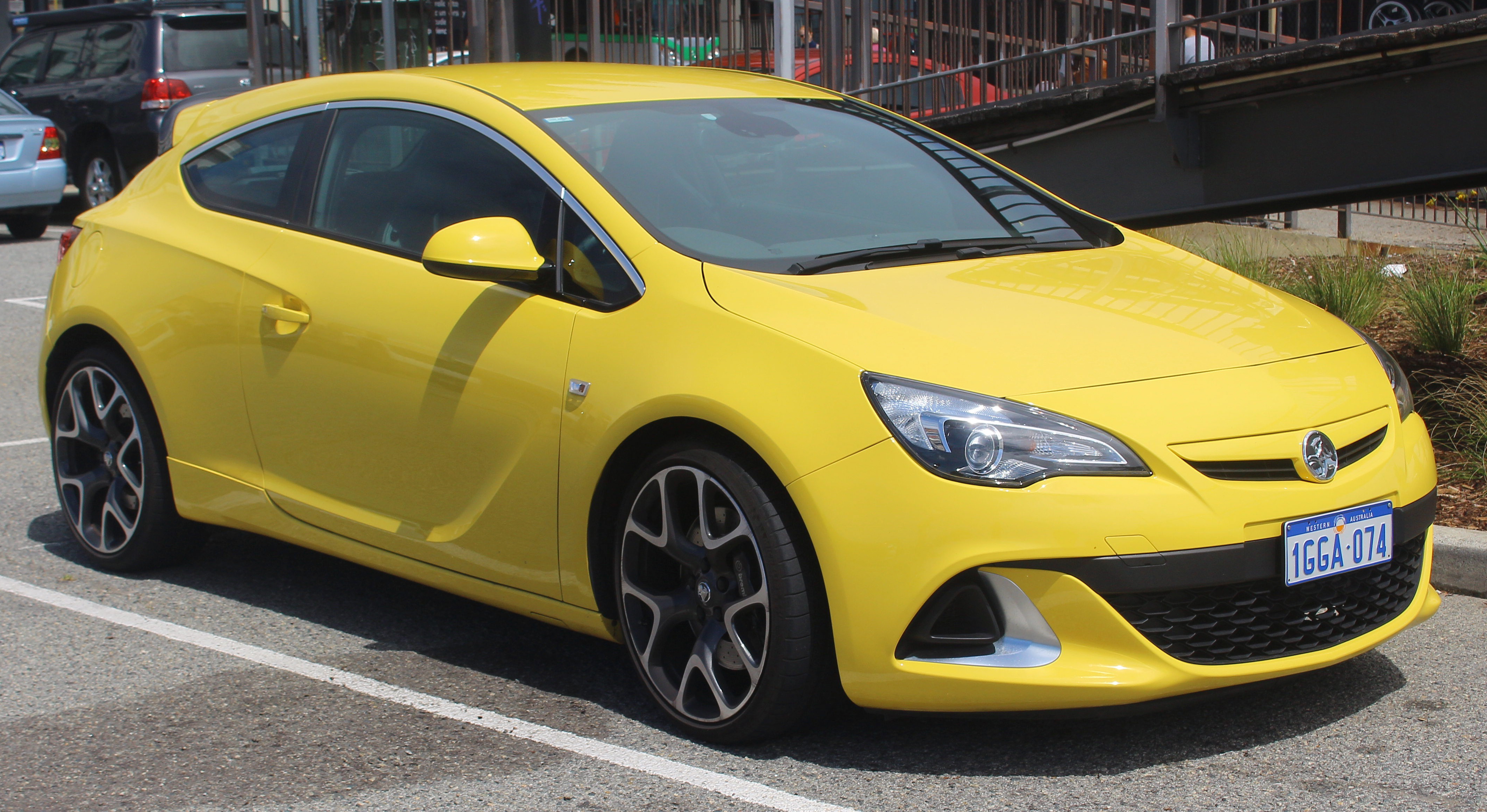
Holden Astra VXR (Australia)

=== Astravan ===
This generation Astra was not available as the commercial version Astravan. But in The Netherlands, the Astra Sports Tourer was available as Astravan at special order.

=== Engines ===
Engines are available with the 5-speed or 6-speed manual transmission. The only optional available automatic transmission is the 6-speed with active select mode, which can be ordered for the 1.4 turbo, 1.6, 1.6 turbo and 2.0 CDTI depending on region. From 2011, Start/Stop was introduced in certain countries on some models, and from 2012 an overboost function was added to the 1.4 turbo. [Engines with (S/S) are in bold in CO_{2} column]. The engines are Family 0/Family 1/Ecotec/MGE (petrol), and MultiJet/Circle L/GM MDE (diesel).

In February 2014, Opel introduced its all-new engine - GM Medium Diesel engine, the so-called "whisper diesel" 1.6 CDTI engine with 136 PS, and later with 110 PS.

Petrol engines
Model	Engine	Displacement	Power	Torque	Note	CO_{2} emission (g/km)	Years
1.4 VVT	I4	1398 cc	87 PS (64 kW; 86 hp) at 6000 rpm	130 N⋅m (96 lb⋅ft) at 4000 rpm		129	
1.4 VVT	I4	1398 cc	100 PS (74 kW; 99 hp) at 6000 rpm	130 N⋅m (96 lb⋅ft) at 4000 rpm		129	
1.4 Turbo VVT	I4	1364 cc	120 PS (88 kW; 118 hp) at 4200 rpm	200 N⋅m (148 lb⋅ft) at 1850–4200 rpm		138	
1.4 Turbo VVT	I4	1364 cc	140 PS (103 kW; 138 hp) at 4900 rpm	200 N⋅m (148 lb⋅ft) at 1850–4900 rpm		138	
1.6 VVT	I4	1598 cc	115 PS (85 kW; 113 hp) at 6000 rpm	155 N⋅m (114 lb⋅ft) at 4000 rpm		147	
1.6 Turbo VVT	I4	1598 cc	180 PS (132 kW; 178 hp) at 5500 rpm	230 N⋅m (170 lb⋅ft) at 2200–5400 rpm		168	
1.6 Turbo SIDI	I4	1598 cc	170 PS (125 kW; 168 hp) at 6000 rpm	260 N⋅m (192 lb⋅ft) (overboost 280 (207)) at 1650–4250 rpm		**144**	2013–
1.6 Turbo SIDI	I4	1598 cc	200 PS (147 kW; 197 hp) at 5500 rpm	280 N⋅m (207 lb⋅ft) (overboost 300 (221)) at 1650–3500 rpm	GTC	**154**	2014–
1.8 VVT	I4	1796 cc	140 PS (103 kW; 138 hp) at 6300 rpm	175 N⋅m (129 lb⋅ft) at 3800 rpm	Russia & China	159	
2.0 Turbo	I4	1998 cc	280 PS (206 kW; 276 hp) at 5500 rpm	400 N⋅m (295 lb⋅ft) at 2400–4500 rpm	OPC/VXR	**189**	2012–

Diesel engines
Model	Engine	Displacement	Power	Torque	CO_{2} emission (g/km)	Years
1.3 CDTI ecoFLEX	I4	1248 cc	95 PS (70 kW; 94 hp) at 4000 rpm	190 N⋅m (140 lb⋅ft) at 1750–3250 rpm	109 (2009–); **104 (2011–)**	2009-'14
1.6 CDTI ecoFLEX	I4	1598 cc	110 PS (81 kW; 108 hp) at 3500 rpm	300 N⋅m (221 lb⋅ft) at 1750–2500 rpm	97	2014–
1.6 CDTI ecoFLEX	I4	1598 cc	136 PS (100 kW; 134 hp) at 3500–4000 rpm	320 N⋅m (236 lb⋅ft) at 2000–2500 rpm	104	2014–
1.7 CDTI ecoFLEX	I4	1686 cc	110 PS (81 kW; 108 hp) at 3800 rpm	260 N⋅m (192 lb⋅ft) at 1700–2500 rpm	119 (2009–); **99 (2011–)**	2009–'14
1.7 CDTI ecoFLEX	I4	1686 cc	125 PS (92 kW; 123 hp) at 4000 rpm	280 N⋅m (207 lb⋅ft) at 2000–2700 rpm	119	2009–'11
1.7 CDTI ecoFLEX	I4	1686 cc	130 PS (96 kW; 128 hp) at 4000 rpm	300 N⋅m (221 lb⋅ft) at 2000–2500 rpm	**99-123**	2011–'14
2.0 CDTI	I4	1956 cc	160 PS (118 kW; 158 hp) at 4000 rpm	350 N⋅m (258 lb⋅ft) at 1750–2500 rpm	129	2009–'11
2.0 CDTI	I4	1956 cc	165 PS (121 kW; 163 hp) at 4000 rpm	350 N⋅m (258 lb⋅ft) at 1750–2500 rpm	**119**	2011–
2.0 CDTI BiTurbo	I4	1956 cc	195 PS (143 kW; 192 hp) at 4000 rpm	400 N⋅m (295 lb⋅ft) at 1750–2500 rpm	**134**	2013–

=== Facelift ===
In June 2012, a facelift was announced for the 2013 model year. Visual changes occurred at the front and back of the hatchback and sports tourer. This included revised bumpers and grills and very minor changes to the headlights. The rear lights were also revised, and had an overall darker appearance, the registration-plate recess of the five-door model was re-designed, and the Sports Tourer (estate body) and 5-door hatchback model received new-style bumpers with chrome trim. New colours were introduced, such as Sculpture Bronze, Phantom Grey and Deep Sky metallic, plus others which were available as extra-cost options. The updated Astra also received some assistance systems such as the Eye front camera with enhanced traffic-sign assistant (TSA II), lane-departure warning (LDW), following-distance indication (FDI) and forward-collision alert (FCA); also available are a rear-view camera, advanced park assist and side-blind-spot alert. A saloon variant was introduced, but only to a very few markets. Engine-wise, the 195-PS 2.0 BiTurbo CDTI from the Insignia became available from autumn 2012, and a new 1.6 L 170 PS turbocharged SIDI Ecotec direct injection unit from the new MGE engine family was added in early 2013.

=== Gallery ===
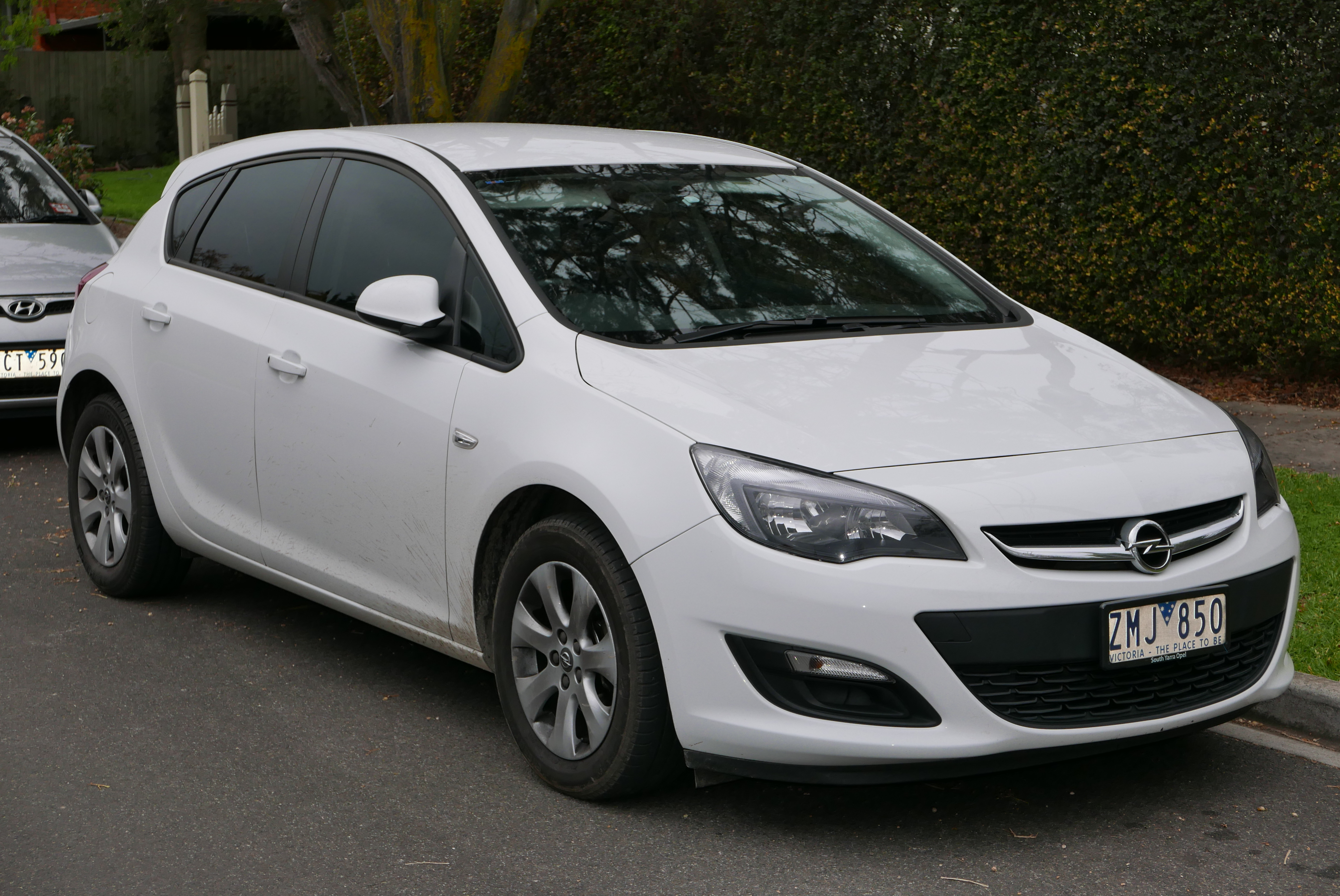
Opel Astra 5-door (facelift)

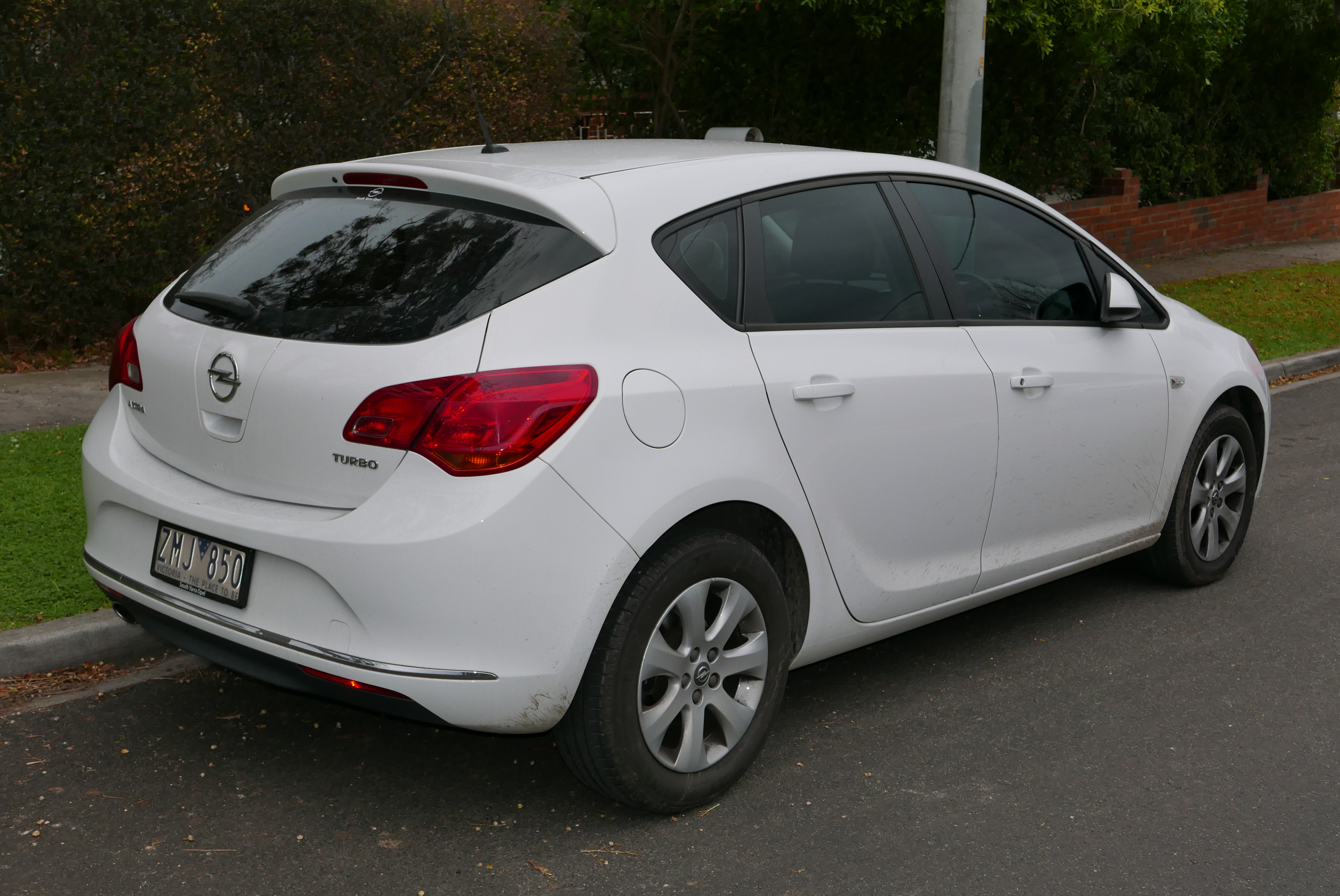
Opel Astra 5-door (facelift)

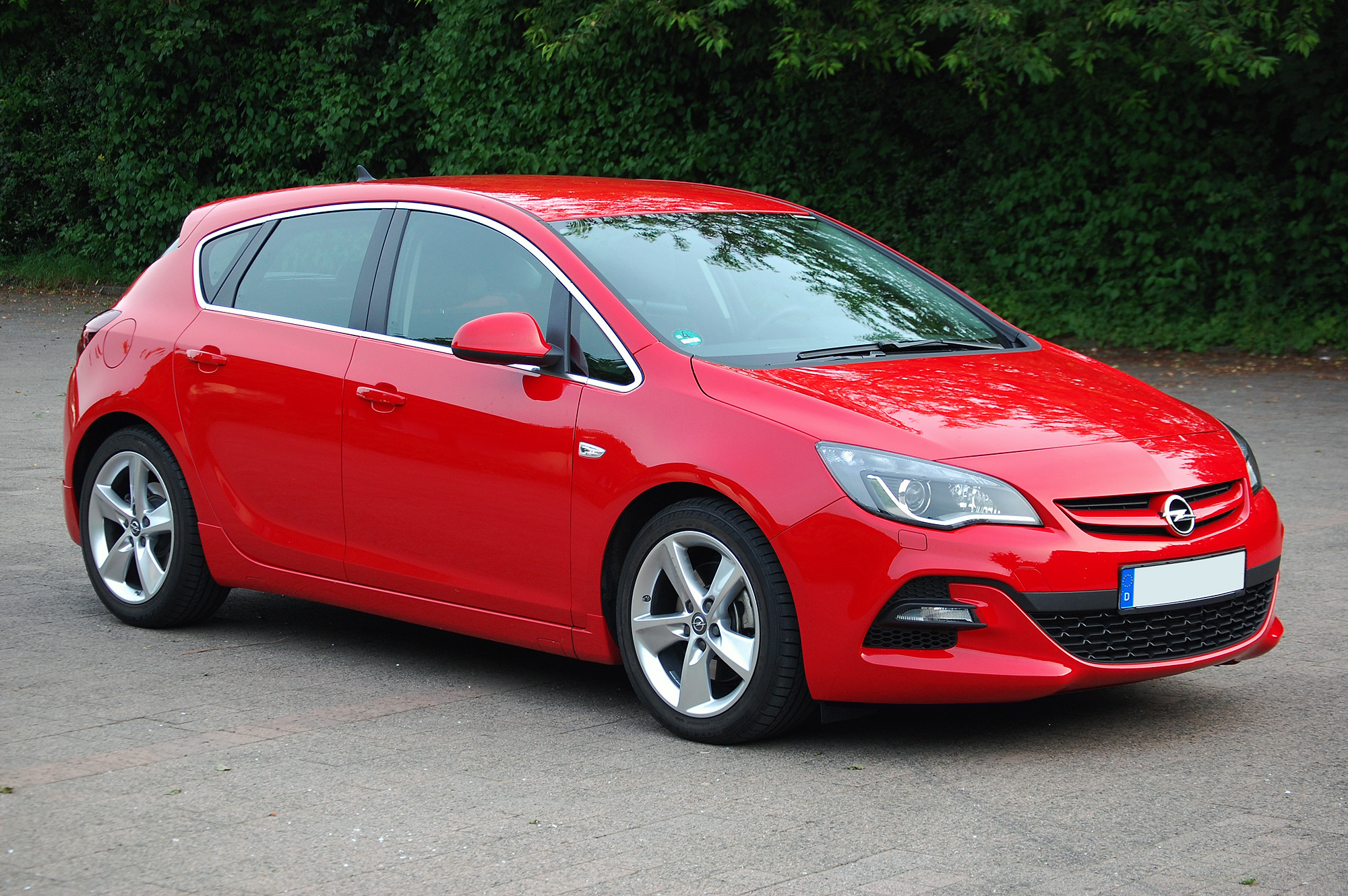
Opel Astra J BiTurbo (since 2012)

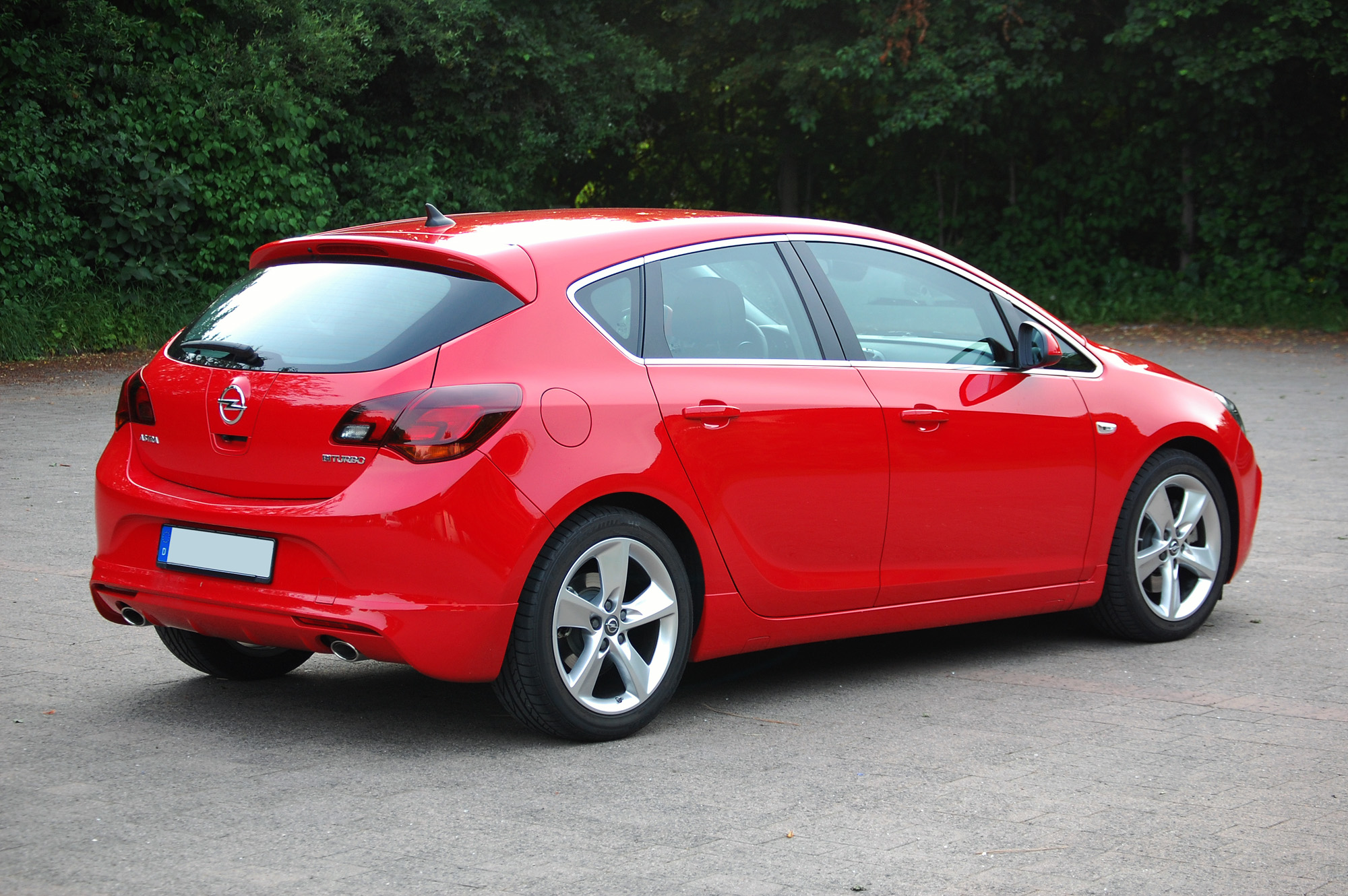
Opel Astra J BiTurbo (since 2012)

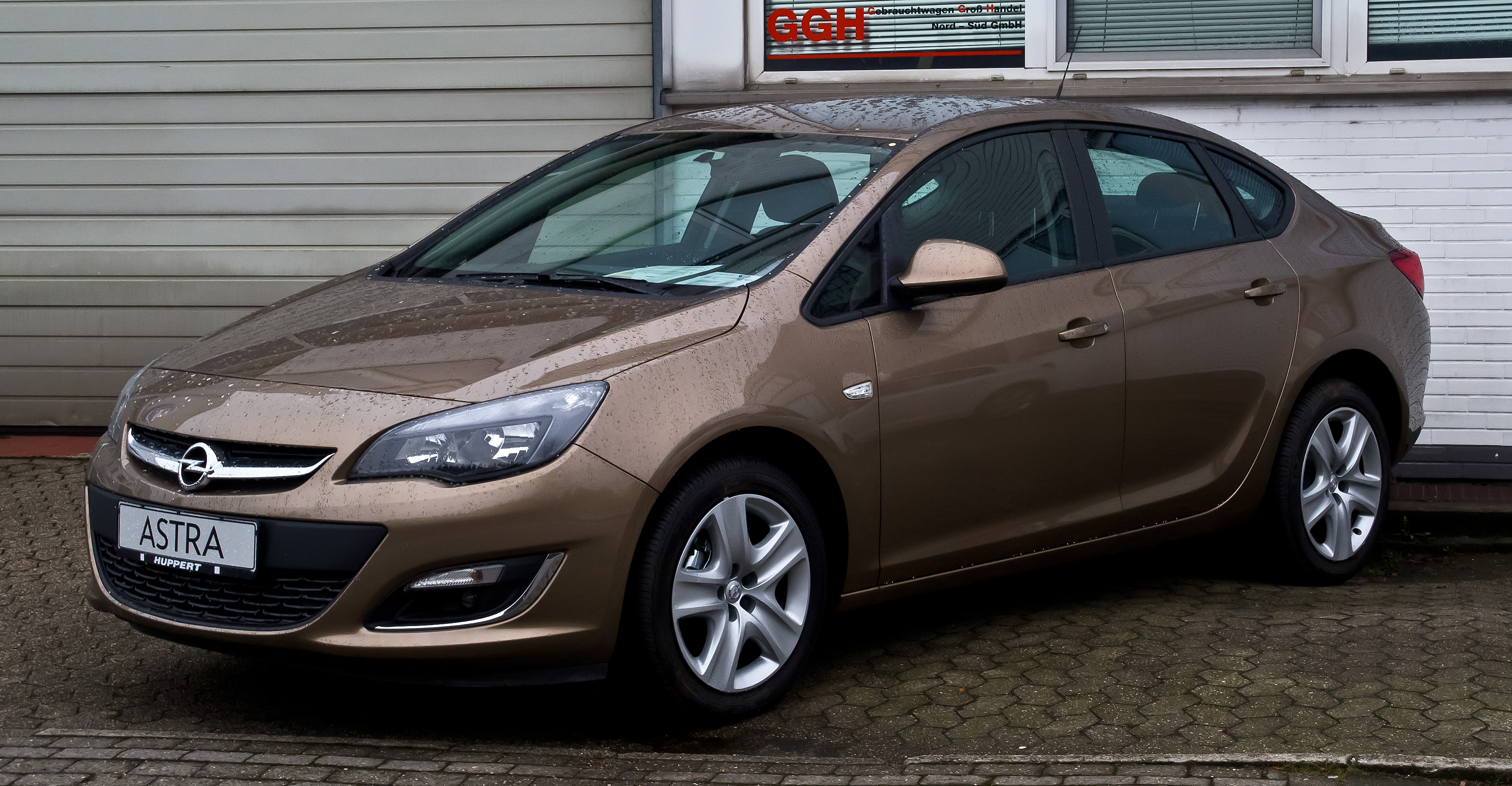
Opel Astra sedan facelift front

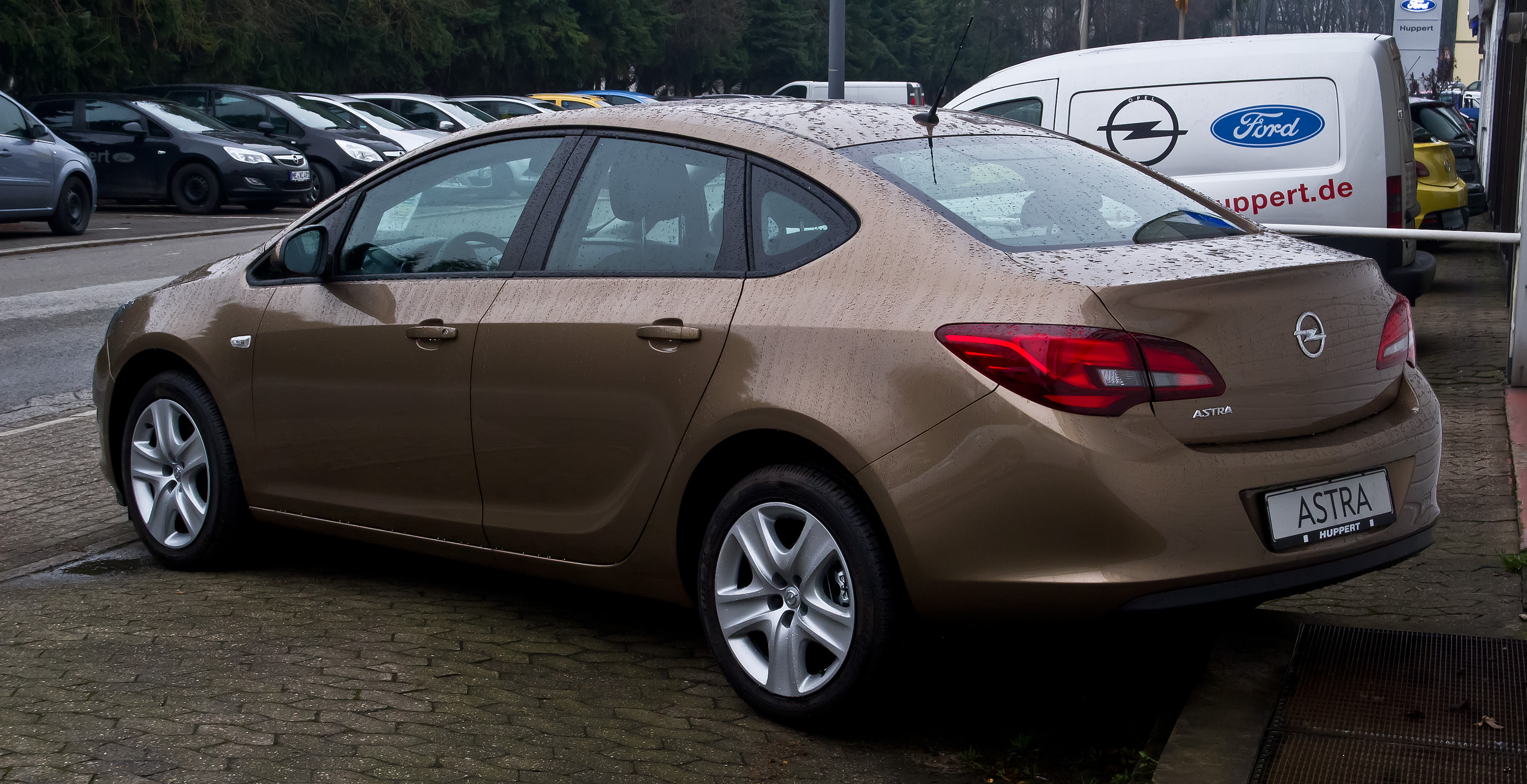
Opel Astra sedan facelift rear

=== Safety ===
Euro NCAP test results* Opel Astra 1.6 Enjoy (LHD) (2009)
Test	Points	%
Overall:	5 /5 stars	
Adult occupant:	34.1	95%
Child occupant:	41.1	84%
Pedestrian:	16.4	46%
Safety assist:	5	71%

ANCAP test results* Opel Astra all wagons and 5 door hatches (2012)
Test	Score
Overall	5 /5 stars
Frontal offset	15.06/16
Side impact	15.96/16
Pole	2/2
Seat belt reminders	2/3
Whiplash protection	Good
Pedestrian protection	Marginal
Electronic stability control	Standard

ANCAP test results* Opel Astra GTC (2012)
Test	Score
Overall	5 /5 stars
Frontal offset	15.07/16
Side impact	14.29/16
Pole	2/2
Seat belt reminders	2/3
Whiplash protection	Good
Pedestrian protection	Marginal
Electronic stability control	Standard

== Fifth generation (Astra K – B15; 2015) ==
Fifth generation (Astra K)
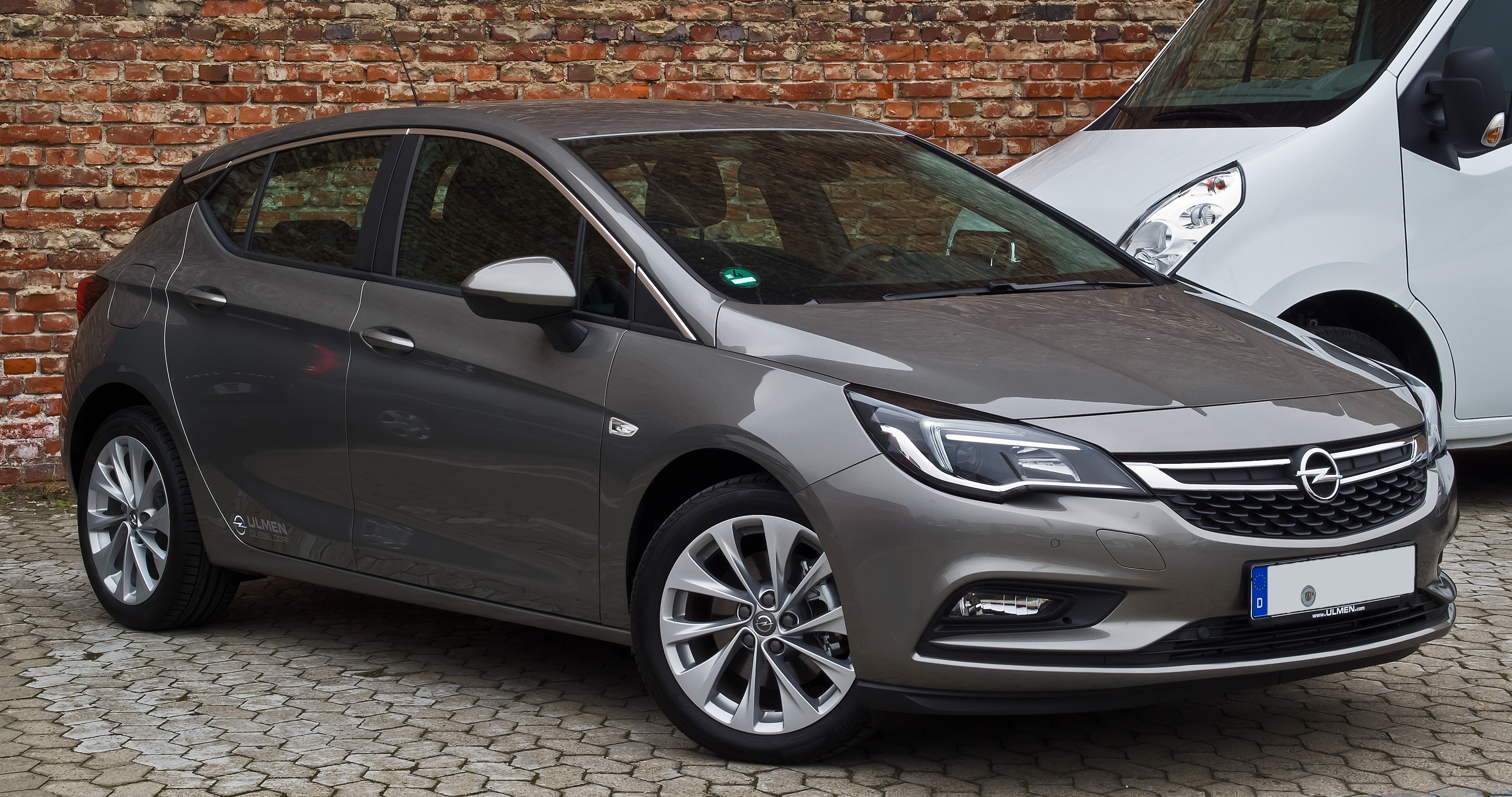
- Opel Astra K Hatchback 5-door (pre-facelift)

Overview
- Model code: B15; B16
- Also called: Vauxhall Astra (United Kingdom); Holden Astra (Australia and New Zealand); Buick Verano Hatchback/GS (China)
- Production: 2015–2021
- Assembly: China: Shenyang (SAIC-GM, for Buick); Poland: Gliwice (Opel Manufacturing Poland); United Kingdom: Ellesmere Port (Vauxhall Ellesmere Port)
- Designer: Uwe Müller

Body and chassis
- Body style: 5-door hatchback 5-door wagon / estate
- Platform: D2XX platform
- Related: Buick Verano; Chevrolet Cruze; Roewe i5 MG 5

Powertrain
- Engine: 2015–2019; Petrol: 1.0 L EcoTec Turbo I3; 1.4 L EcoTec I4; 1.4 L EcoTec Turbo I4; 1.6 L EcoTec Turbo I4; Diesel: 1.6 L GM MDE Turbo Diesel I4; 1.6 L GM MDE Twin Turbo Diesel I4; 2019–2021; Petrol: 1.2 L EcoTec Turbo I3; 1.3 L EcoTec Turbo I3; Diesel: 1.5 L GM MDE Turbo Diesel I3
- Transmission: 2015–2019; 5-speed Vauxhall F17-5+ WR manual; 6-Speed GM M22 manual; 5-speed Bosch/GM Easytronic F17 +ER MTA automated manual; 6-speed GM 6T35 automatic; 2015–2021; 6-speed GM M32 WR manual (for Diesel); 2019–2021; 6-Speed PSA MB6 manual; 7-Speed CVT (1.4 Turbo); 9-speed GM Hydra-Matic 9T45 transmission automatic

Dimensions
- Wheelbase: 2,662 mm (104.8 in)
- Length: 5-door hatch: 4,370 mm (172.0 in); Wagon: 4,702 mm (185.1 in)
- Width: 1,809 mm (71.2 in)
- Height: 5-door hatch: 1,485 mm (58.5 in); Wagon: 1,499 mm (59.0 in)

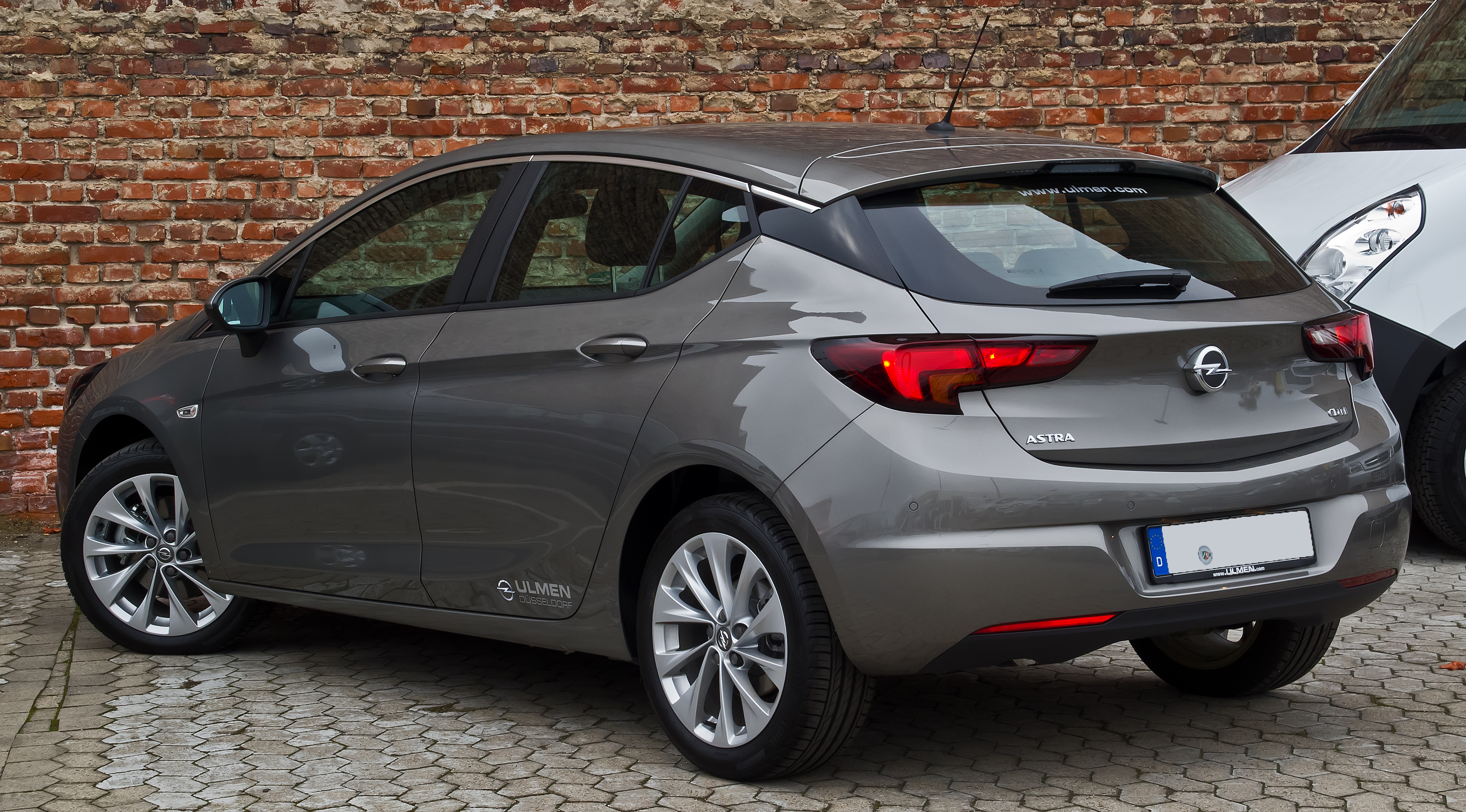
Opel Astra 1.6 CDTI ecoFLEX Edition (Germany)

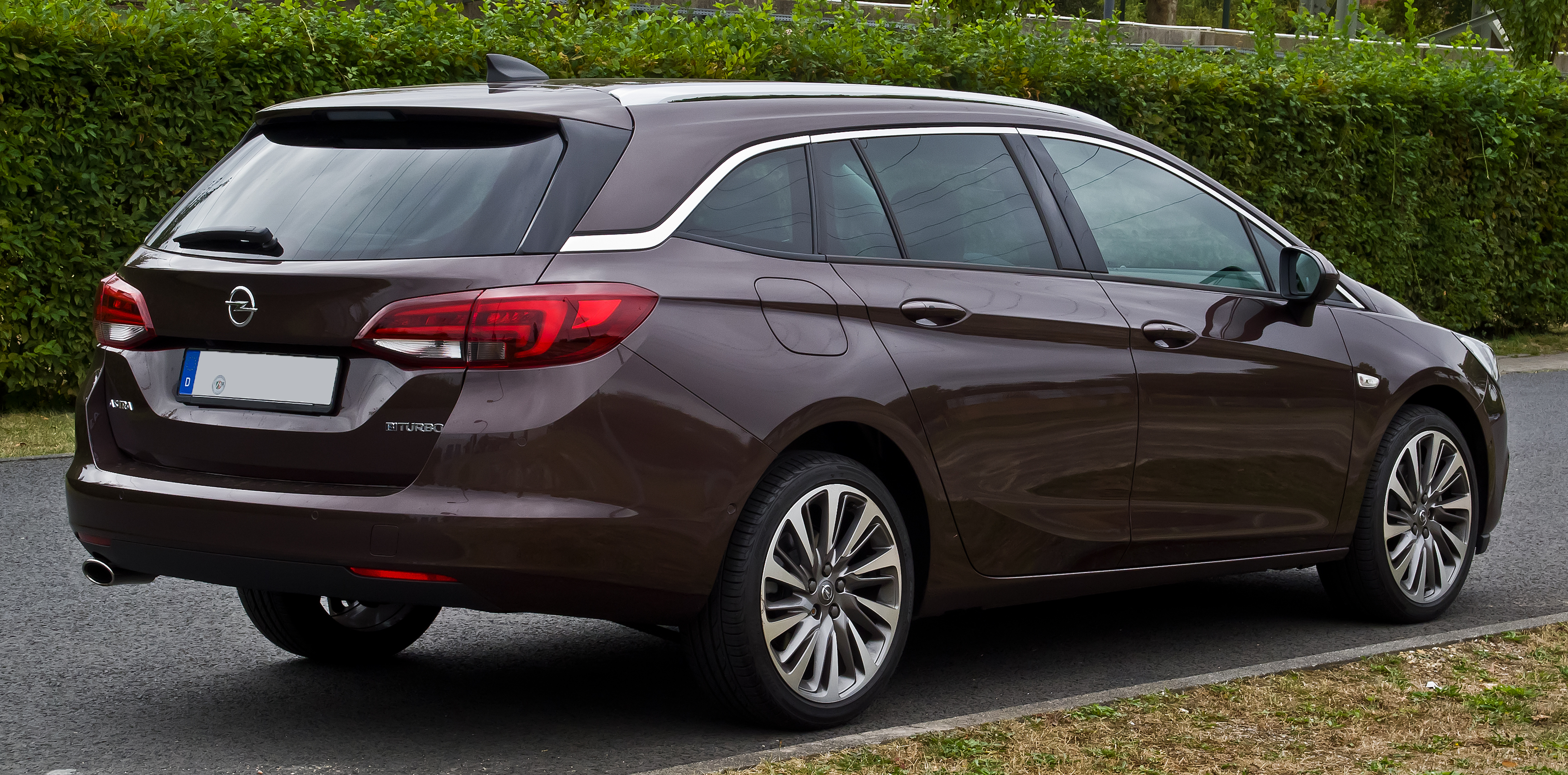
Opel Astra 1.6 BiTurbo CDTI ecoFLEX Innovation Sports Tourer (Germany)

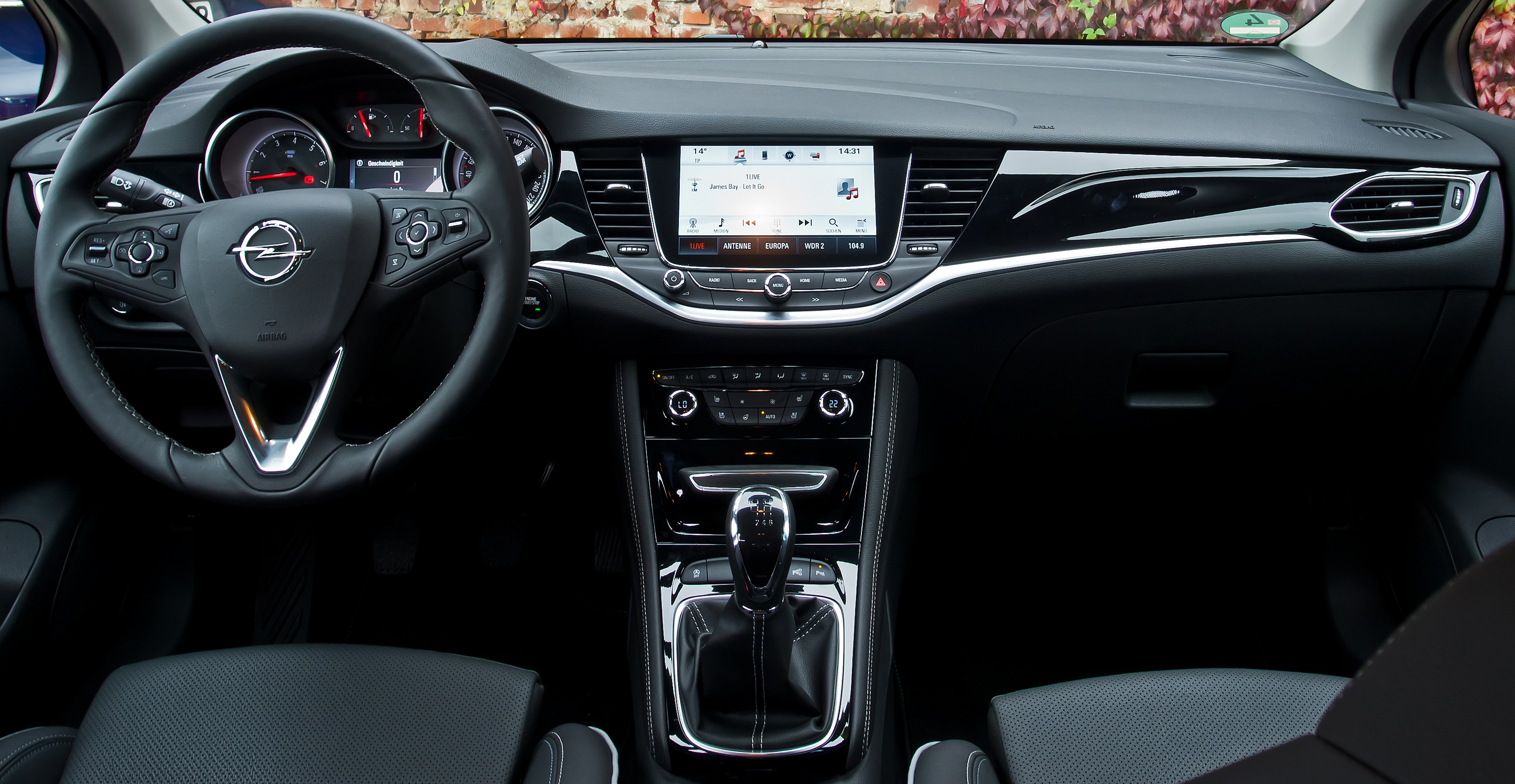
Interior

Opel officially unveiled the Astra K on 1 June 2015 and made its official premiere at the Frankfurt Motor Show in September 2015.

The Astra K is smaller (5cm), and lighter (up to 200kg) compared to Astra J. Although it is smaller on the outside, Opel claims it is bigger on the inside than the previous Astra J. Depending on the model and trim level it is up to 200 kilograms - at the very least 120 kilograms - lighter than its predecessor. The completely new vehicle architecture plays a major role in the weight reduction. Every component was checked for compact design and lightweight materials. The bodyshell weight alone was reduced by 20 per cent from 357 to 280 kilograms. Additional, chassis-related measures resulted in another 50 kilograms of weight reduction; these include high-strength and ultra-high-strength low-weight steels, compact subframes as well as weight reductions to the front and rear axle. Rear suspension is torsion beam (only with Watts linkage on top engines), and MacPherson struts at the front.

Available engines are 1.0-litre three-cylinder and 1.4-litre four-cylinder petrol engines or 1.6-litre diesels. It is available with full-LED front light techniques, A screen in the dash which connect to Android or iPhone comes as standard. This system is already available, in both the Corsa E and Adam.

=== Engines ===
Engines are available with the 5-speed or 6-speed manual transmission, and the newly developed 5-speed EasyTronic 3.0 automated manual, which is only available for the 1.0T SIDI engine. The only other available automatic transmission, at the beginning of production, is the 6-speed with active select mode, which can be ordered in late 2015, for the 1.4 SIDI Turbo with 150 PS, and 1.6 CDTI with 136 PS. Buyers can choose the Start/Stop system for all engines as an extra feature, except the 1.0T which will have system as standard.

All engines are new and recently developed by Opel - 1.0T SIDI, 1.4T SIDI (which sees its debut in the Astra K in 2015) and the naturally aspirated version of it (which will be available later in 2015), and the so-called "Whisper diesel" 1.6 CDTI. All turbocharged petrol engines use the Direct Injection Fuel system.

Opel are offering the ecoFLEX range for 1.0T, 1.4T and 1.6 CDTI engines which have same amount of power, but less CO_{2}-emissions (g/km) and lower fuel consumption. The entire ecoFLEX range have Start/Stop as standard, low rolling resistance tyres and aerodynamic tweaks for reduced drag for lower CO_{2}-emissions. The 1.4T SIDI ecoFLEX version have less torque, rated at 230 N⋅m (170 lbf⋅ft) at 2.000-4.000 rpm.

In 2019, Opel announced the move to the new GM E-Turbo 1.2-litre, "1.4-litre" (actually a 1.3-litre) three-cylinder petrol engines, and 1.5-litre three-cylinder diesels.

=== Facelift ===
A facelift of Opel Astra K released around the summer of 2019. Changes were minimal, both inside and outside; however the facelifted Astra sports a new front grille, new rear lights, as well as a new windscreen wiper mechanism, where both wipers are individually controlled as opposed to a linked setup as before.

The last Astra to be produced in Ellesmere Port rolled off the assembly line on December 13, 2021. The last Astra to be produced in Gliwice factory rolled off the assembly line on November 30, 2021.

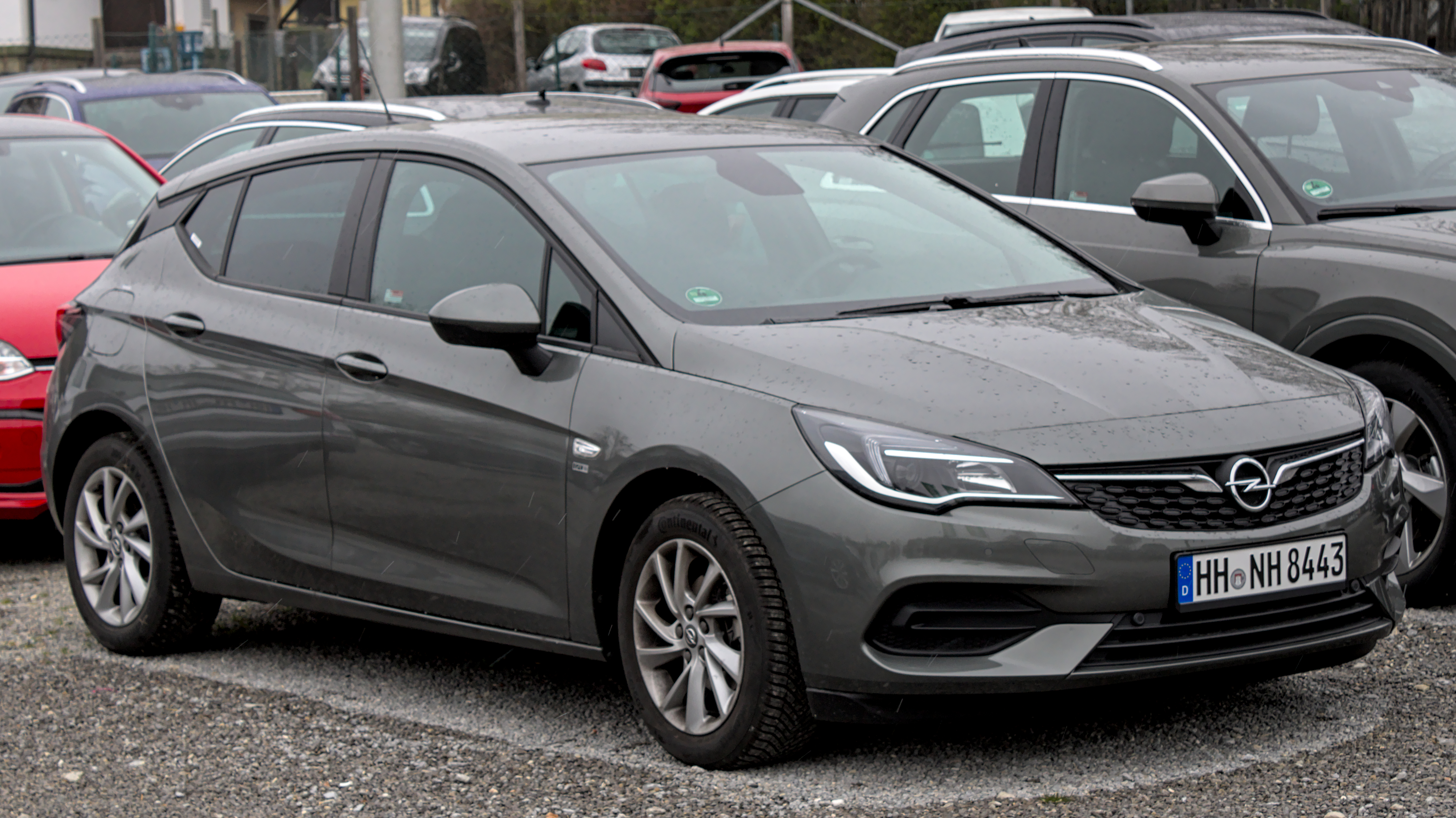
Hatchback (facelift)

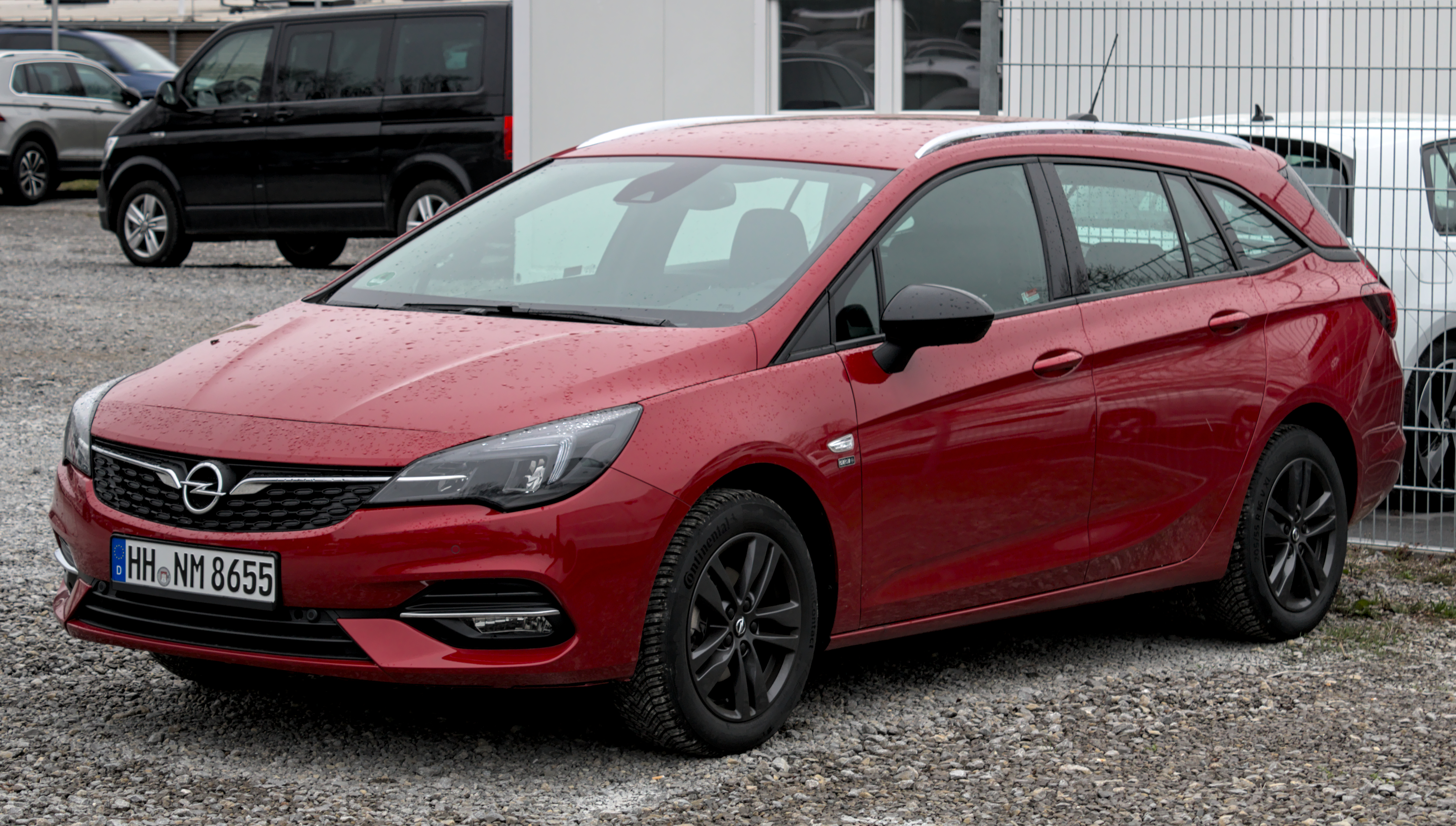
Estate (facelift)

Petrol engines
Model	Engine	Displacement	Power	Torque	Note	CO_{2} emissions	Years
1.0T SIDI S/S	I3	999 cc	105 PS (77 kW; 104 hp) at 5000 rpm	170 N⋅m (125 lb⋅ft) at 1800-4250 rpm		102-96 g/km	2015-2019
1.4	I4	1399 cc	100 PS (74 kW; 99 hp) at 6000 rpm	130 N⋅m (96 lb⋅ft) at 4400 rpm		124 g/km	2015-2019
1.4 SIDI Turbo	I4	1399 cc	110 PS (81 kW; 108 hp) at 5600 rpm	200 N⋅m (148 lb⋅ft) at 2000-3600 rpm	CNG/Petrol	113 g/km	2015-2019
1.4 SIDI Turbo	I4	1399 cc	125 PS (92 kW; 123 hp) at 5600 rpm	245 N⋅m (181 lb⋅ft) at 2000-3500 rpm		114-129 g/km	2015-2019
1.4 SIDI Turbo	I4	1399 cc	150 PS (110 kW; 148 hp) at 6000 rpm	245 N⋅m (181 lb⋅ft) at 2000-3500 rpm		128-124 g/km	2015-2019
1.6 SIDI Turbo S/S	I4	1,598 cc	200 PS (147 kW; 197 hp) at 4,700-5,500 rpm	280 N⋅m (207 lb⋅ft) at 1,650–3,500 rpm; overboost 300 N⋅m (221 lb⋅ft) at 1,700–4,700 rpm		139-142	2015-2019
1.2 Turbo	I3	1199 cc	110 PS (81 kW; 108 hp) at 4500 rpm	195 N⋅m (144 lb⋅ft) at 2000-3500 rpm	6-speed manual	105-99 g/km	2019-
1.2 Turbo	I3	1199 cc	130 PS (96 kW; 128 hp) at 5500 rpm	225 N⋅m (166 lb⋅ft) at 2000-3500 rpm	6-speed manual	104-99 g/km	2019-
1.2 Turbo	I3	1199 cc	145 PS (107 kW; 143 hp) at 5500 rpm	225 N⋅m (166 lb⋅ft) at 2000-3500 rpm	6-speed manual	105-99 g/km	2019-
1.4 Turbo S/S	I3	1342 cc	145 PS (107 kW; 143 hp) at 5500 rpm	236 N⋅m (174 lb⋅ft) at 1500-3500 rpm	7-Speed CVT automatic transmission	116-114 g/km	2019-

Diesel engines
Model	Engine	Displacement	Power	Torque	Note	CO_{2} emissions	Years
1.6 CDTI	I4	1,598 cc	95 PS (70 kW; 94 hp) at 3,500 rpm	280 N⋅m (207 lb⋅ft) at 1500–1750 rpm		97-95 g/km	2015-2019
1.6 CDTI	I4	1,598 cc	110 PS (81 kW; 108 hp) at 3500 rpm	300 N⋅m (221 lb⋅ft) at 1750–2000 rpm		97-90 g/km	2015-2019
1.6 CDTI	I4	1,598 cc	136 PS (100 kW; 134 hp) at 3500-4000 rpm	320 N⋅m (236 lb⋅ft) at 2000–2250 rpm		103-99 g/km	2015-2019
1.6 CDTI Bi-Turbo	I4	1,598 cc	160 PS (118 kW; 158 hp) at 4000 rpm	350 N⋅m (258 lb⋅ft) at 1500-2250 rpm		110-107 g/km	2015-2019
1.5D CDTI S/S	I3	1496 cc	105 PS (77 kW; 104 hp) at 3250 rpm	260 N⋅m (192 lb⋅ft) at 1500-2500 rpm	6-speed manual	94-90 g/km	2019-
1.5D CDTI S/S	I3	1496 cc	122 PS (90 kW; 120 hp) at 3500 rpm	300 N⋅m (221 lb⋅ft) at 1750-2500 rpm	6-speed manual	96-92 g/km	2019-
1.5D CDTI S/S	I3	1496 cc	122 PS (90 kW; 120 hp) at 3500 rpm	285 N⋅m (210 lb⋅ft) at 1500-2750 rpm	9-speed automatic	114-109 g/km	2019-

=== Safety ===
Euro NCAP test results* Opel Astra 1.4 Enjoy (LHD) (2015)
Test	Points	%
Overall:	5 /5 stars	
Adult occupant:	32.9	86%
Child occupant:	41.2	84%
Pedestrian:	30	83%
Safety assist:	9.8	75%

== Sixth generation (Astra L – C02; 2021) ==
Sixth generation (Astra L)
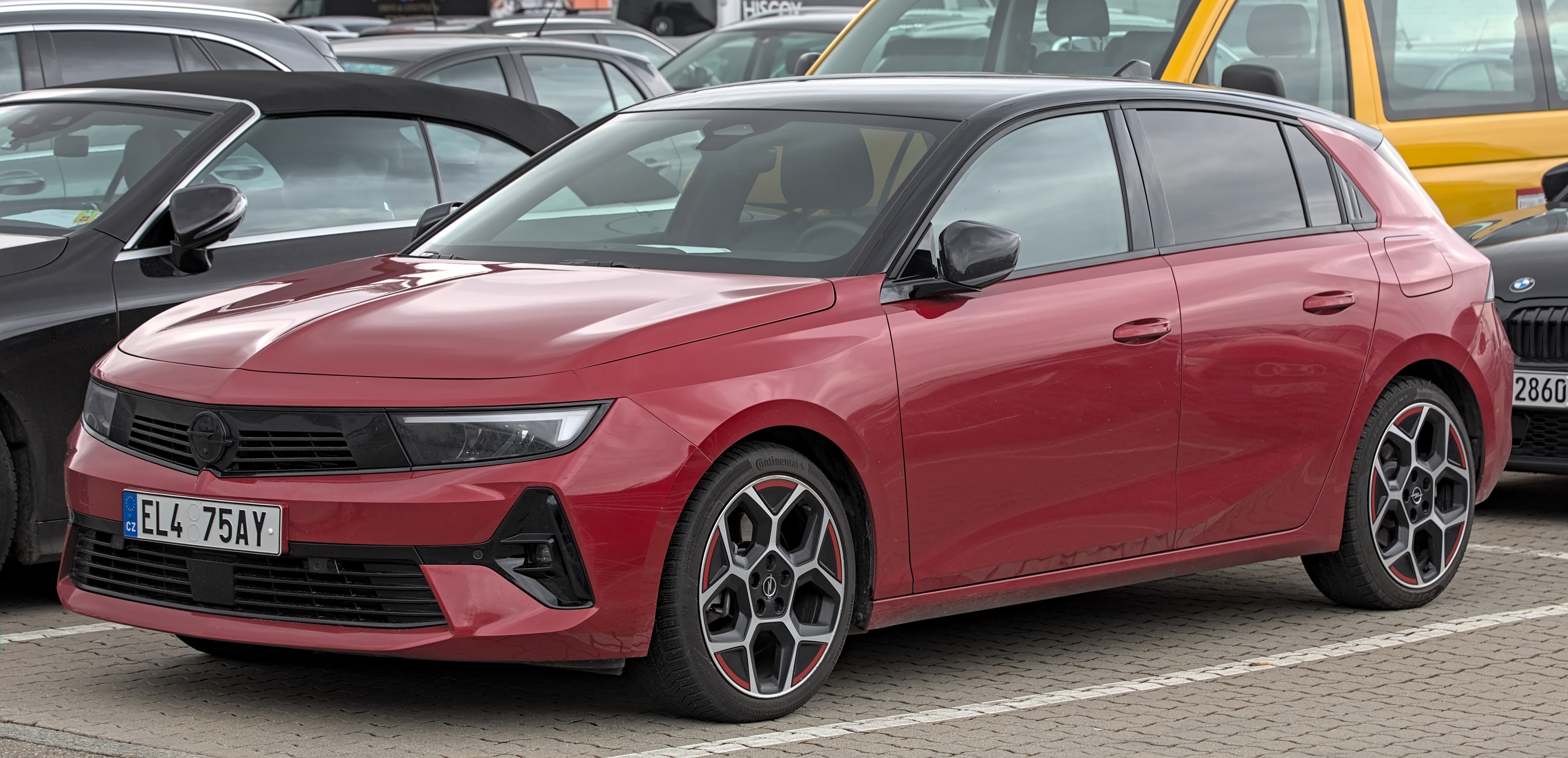
- Opel Astra PHEV

Overview
- Model code: C02
- Also called: Vauxhall Astra (United Kingdom)
- Production: November 2021–present
- Assembly: Germany: Rüsselsheim
- Designer: Niels Loeb; Ilka Höbermann (color and trim designer)

Body and chassis
- Body style: 5-door hatchback; 5-door station wagon
- Platform: PSA EMP2 platform
- Related: DS No. 4 Peugeot 308 III; Peugeot 408

Powertrain
- Engine: Petrol: 1.2 L EB2ADT/EB2DTS turbo I3; Petrol Mild Hybrid: 1.2 L EB2LTEDH2 turbo I3; Petrol PHEV: 1.6 L EP6FDT turbo I4; Diesel: 1.5 L DV5 BlueHDi turbo I4
- Electric motor: Synchronous Electric Motor (Astra Plug-in Hybrid)
- Transmission: 6-speed manual 6 speed e-DCT (MHEV); 8-speed automatic
- Hybrid drivetrain: MHEV (Astra Hybrid) PHEV (Astra Plug-in Hybrid)
- Battery: 0.43 kWh (Hybrid) 12.3 kWh (Plug-in Hybrid) (2022-2025) 17.2 kWh (Plug-in Hybrid) (2025-present)

Dimensions
- Wheelbase: 2,675 mm (105.3 in) (hatchback); 2,730 mm (107.5 in) (station wagon)
- Length: 4,374 mm (172.2 in) (hatchback); 4,640 mm (182.7 in) (station wagon)
- Width: 1,860 mm (73.2 in)
- Height: 1,441 mm (56.7 in)

The sixth generation Astra was unveiled on 13 July 2021 and it went on sale on 12 November 2021. As the first Astra developed by PSA Group, it’s based on the third-generation of the EMP2 platform which made its wheelbase grow by 55 mm (2.2 in). Launched ten months after the merger of FCA and PSA to form Stellantis, the vehicle has been offered as a hybrid for the first time, with a 180-horsepower powertrain. The 225 horsepower hybrid version, taken from the Peugeot 508 and Peugeot 3008, is also available on the GSe version. An all-electric version is also available.

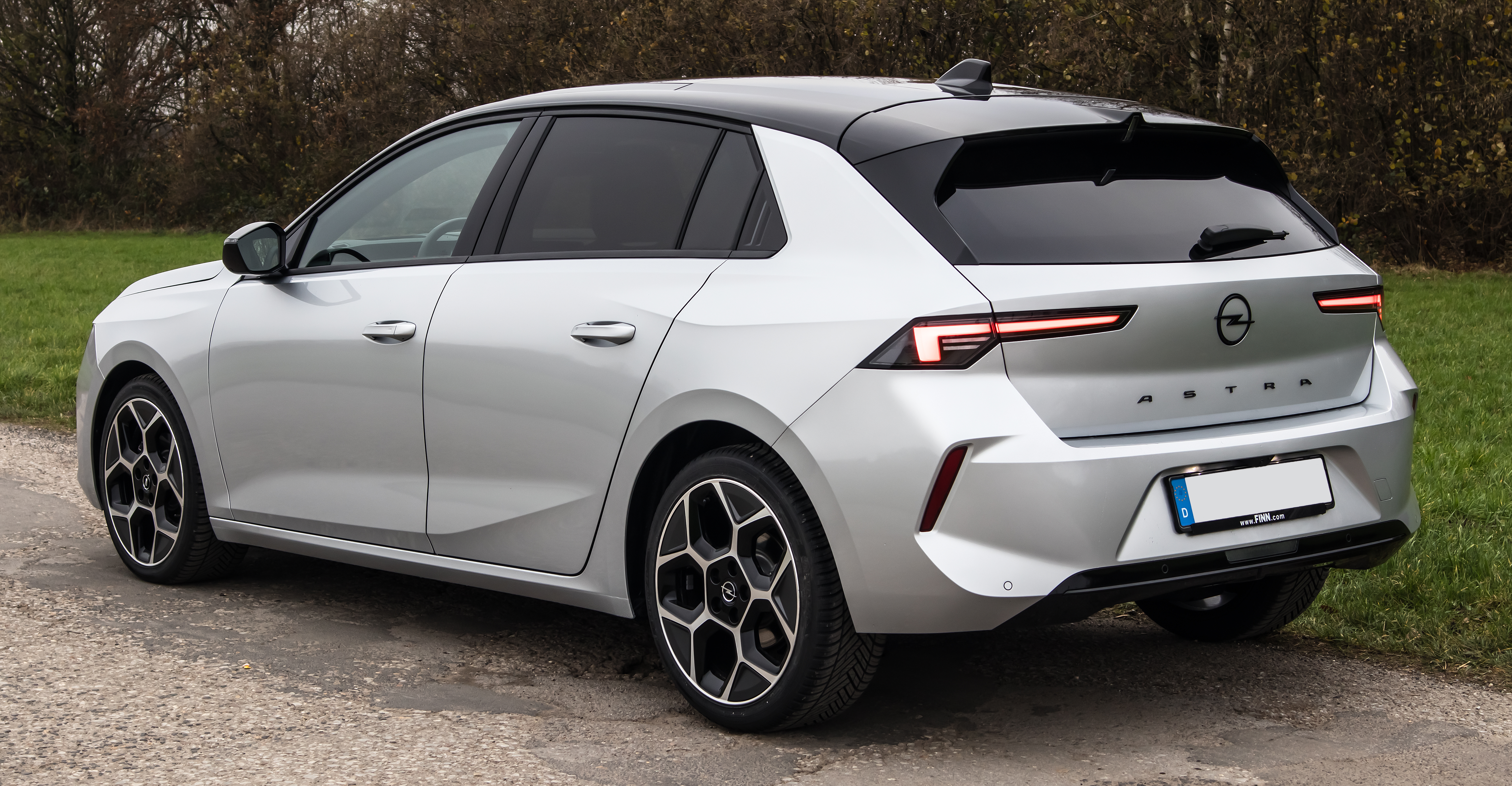
Hatchback

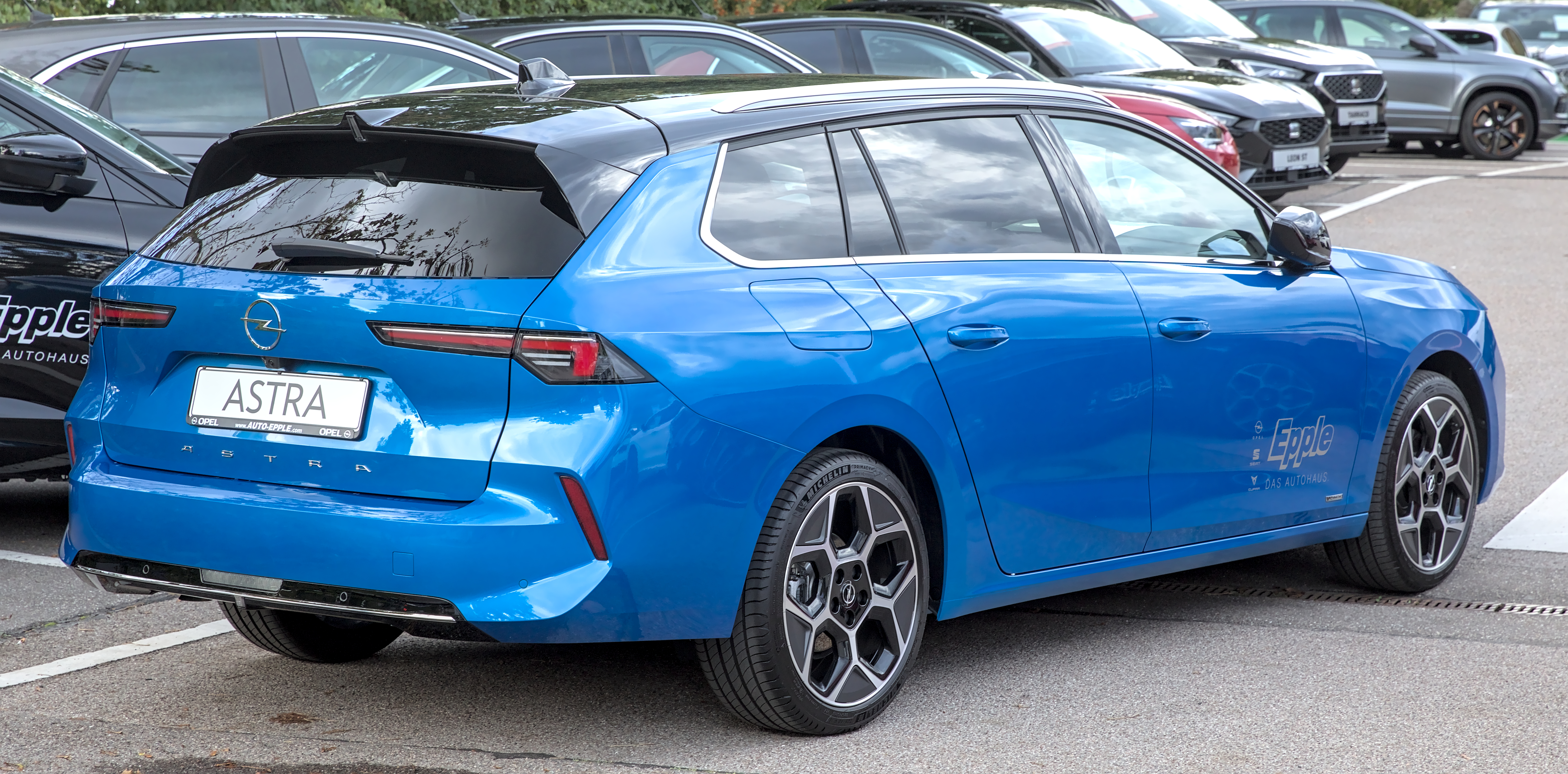
Sports Tourer

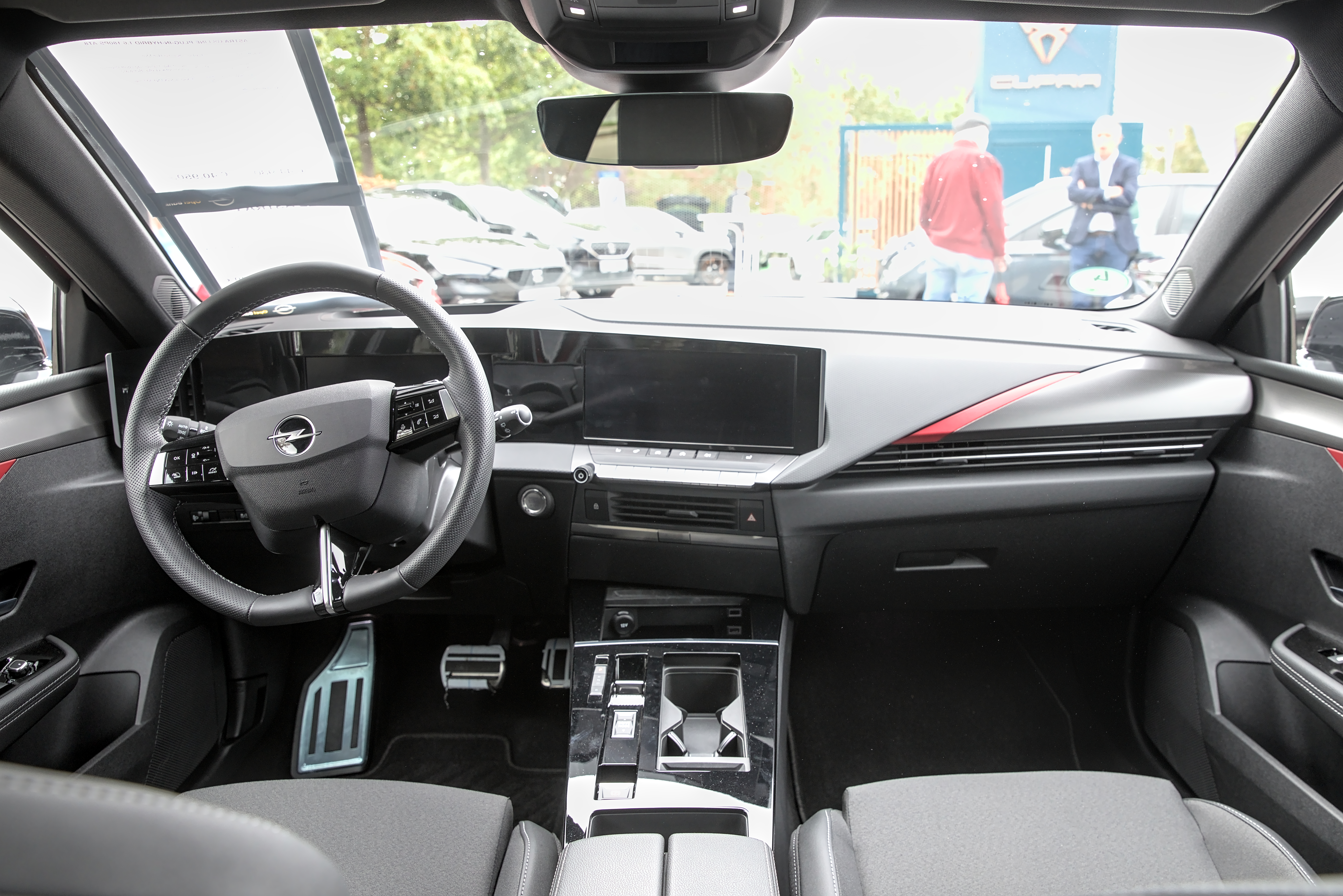
Interior

Petrol engines
Model	Name	Displacement	Power	Torque	Note	CO_{2} emissions	Years
1.2 Turbo	EB2ADT	1199 cc I3	110 PS (81 kW; 108 hp) at 5500 rpm	205 N⋅m (151 lb⋅ft) at 1750 rpm	6-speed manual	123 g/km	2022-
1.2 Turbo	EB2DTS	1199 cc I3	130 PS (96 kW; 128 hp) at 5500 rpm	230 N⋅m (170 lb⋅ft) at 1750 rpm	6-speed manual or 8-speed automatic	123-126g/km	2022-
1.6 Turbo PHEV	EP6FDT	1598 cc I4	180 PS (132 kW; 178 hp) at 4250 rpm	360 N⋅m (266 lb⋅ft) at 1500-3000 rpm	8-speed automatic Values given are for the whole drivetrain (PHEV)	22 g/km	2022-
1.6 Turbo PHEV (GSe)	EP6FDT	1598 cc I4	225 PS (165 kW; 222 hp)	360 N⋅m (266 lb⋅ft)	8-speed automatic Values given are for the whole drivetrain (PHEV)		

Diesel engines
Model	Name	Displacement	Power	Torque	Note	CO_{2} emissions	Years
1.5 D	DV6 TED4	1499 cc I4	130 PS (96 kW; 128 hp) at 3750 rpm	300 N⋅m (221 lb⋅ft) at 1750 rpm	6-speed manual or 8-speed automatic	113-117 g/km	2022-

=== Electric ===
In November 2022, the Opel / Vauxhall Astra Electric debuted with a 154 hp (115 kW) motor, 54 kWh battery and a range of 258 mi (415 km).

=== Facelift (2026) ===
In January 2026, Opel officially revealed a facelift of the Astra L at the Brussels Motor Show. Sales of the facelifted version began in February 2026. Sales in the UK began on 28 May 2026.

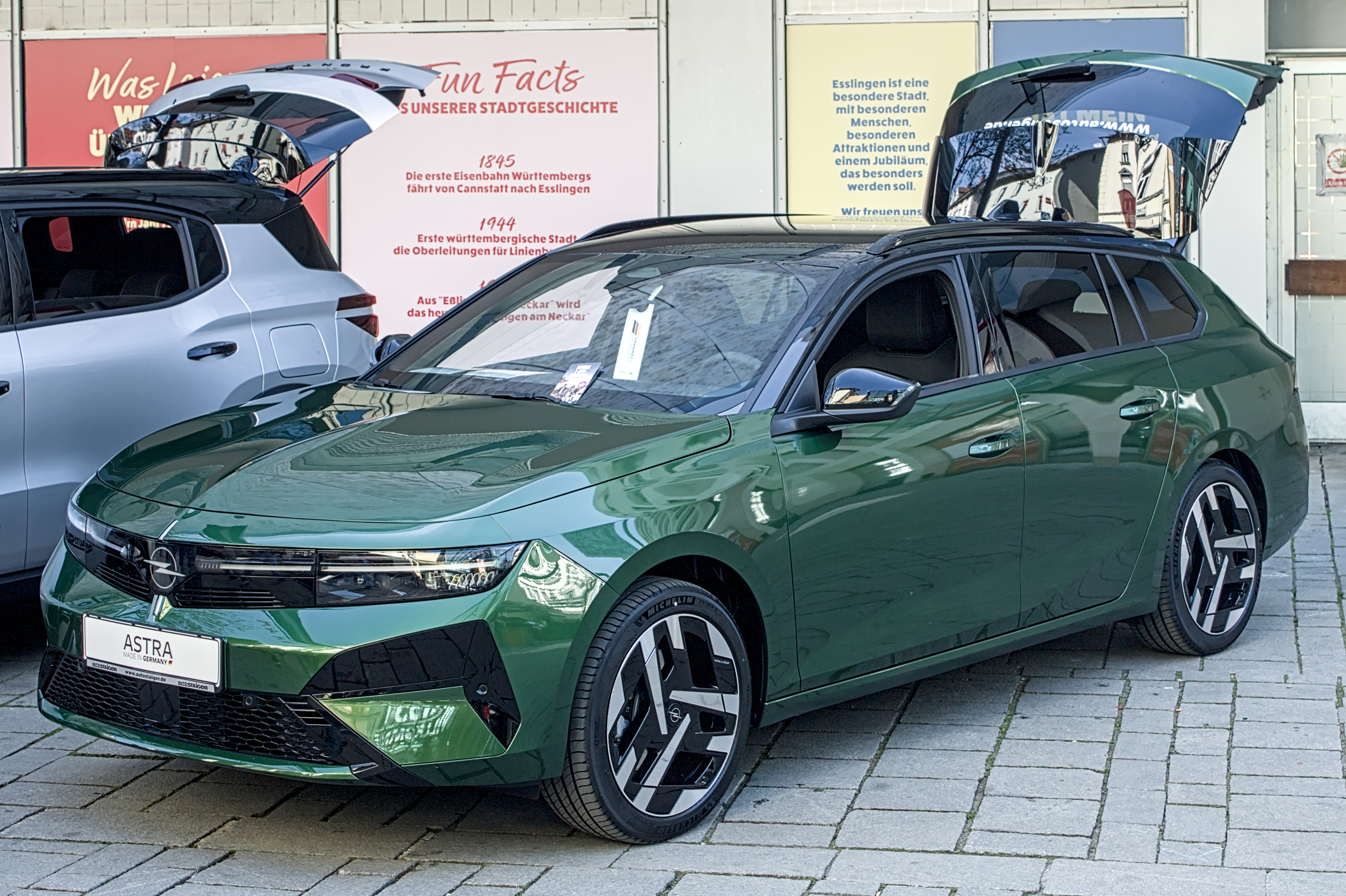
Sports Tourer (facelift)

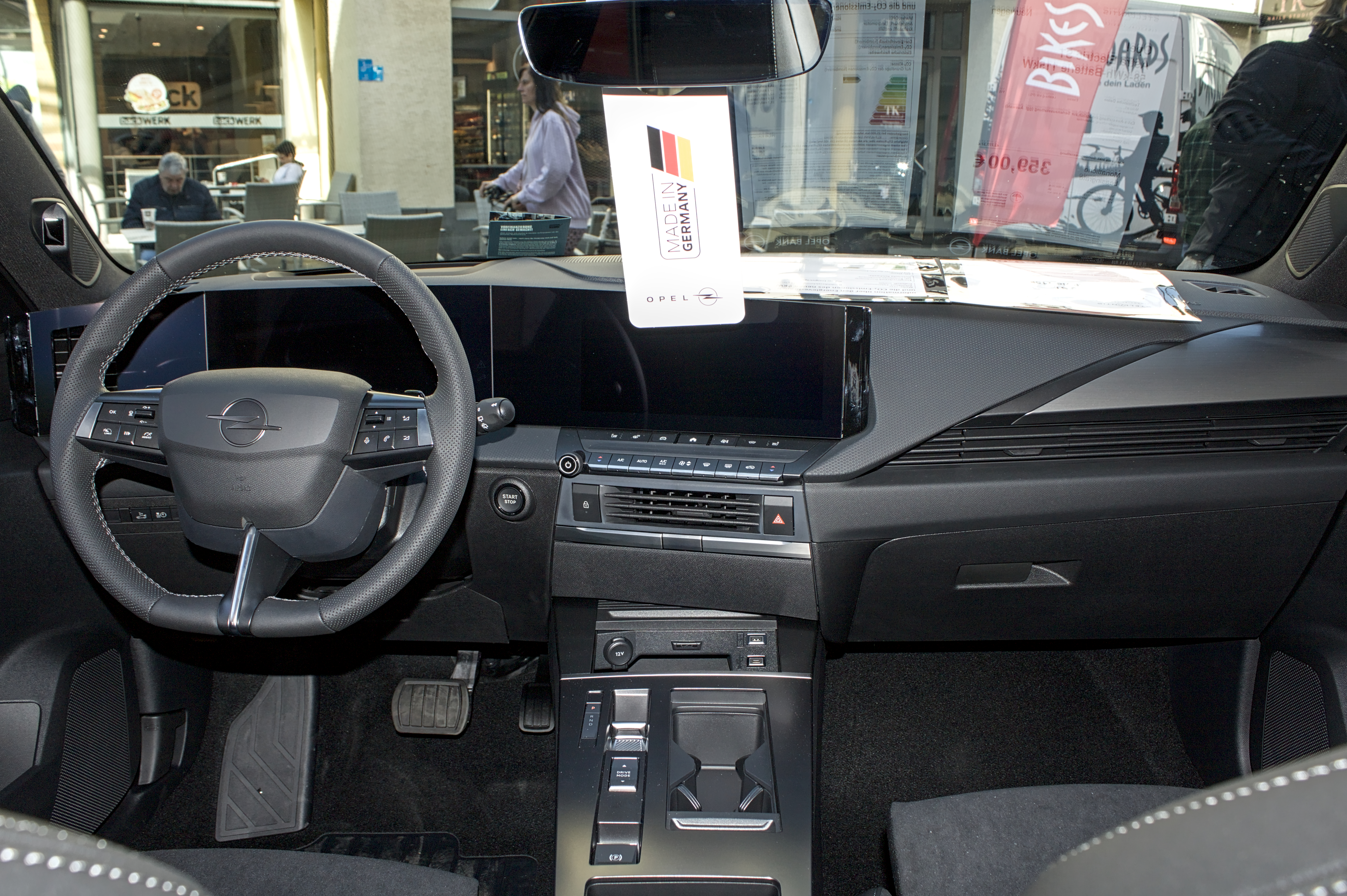
Interior

=== Safety ===
Euro NCAP test results Opel Astra 1.2 Edition (LHD) (2022)
Test	Points	%
Overall:	4 /5 stars	
Adult occupant:	30.7	80%
Child occupant:	41.2	82%
Pedestrian:	36.4	67%
Safety assist:	10.6	66%

ANCAP test results Opel Astra all petrol variants (2022, aligned with Euro NCAP)
Test	Points	%
Overall:	5 /5 stars	
Adult occupant:	31.66	83%
Child occupant:	41.45	84%
Pedestrian:	36.36	67%
Safety assist:	10.68	66%

== Motorsport ==
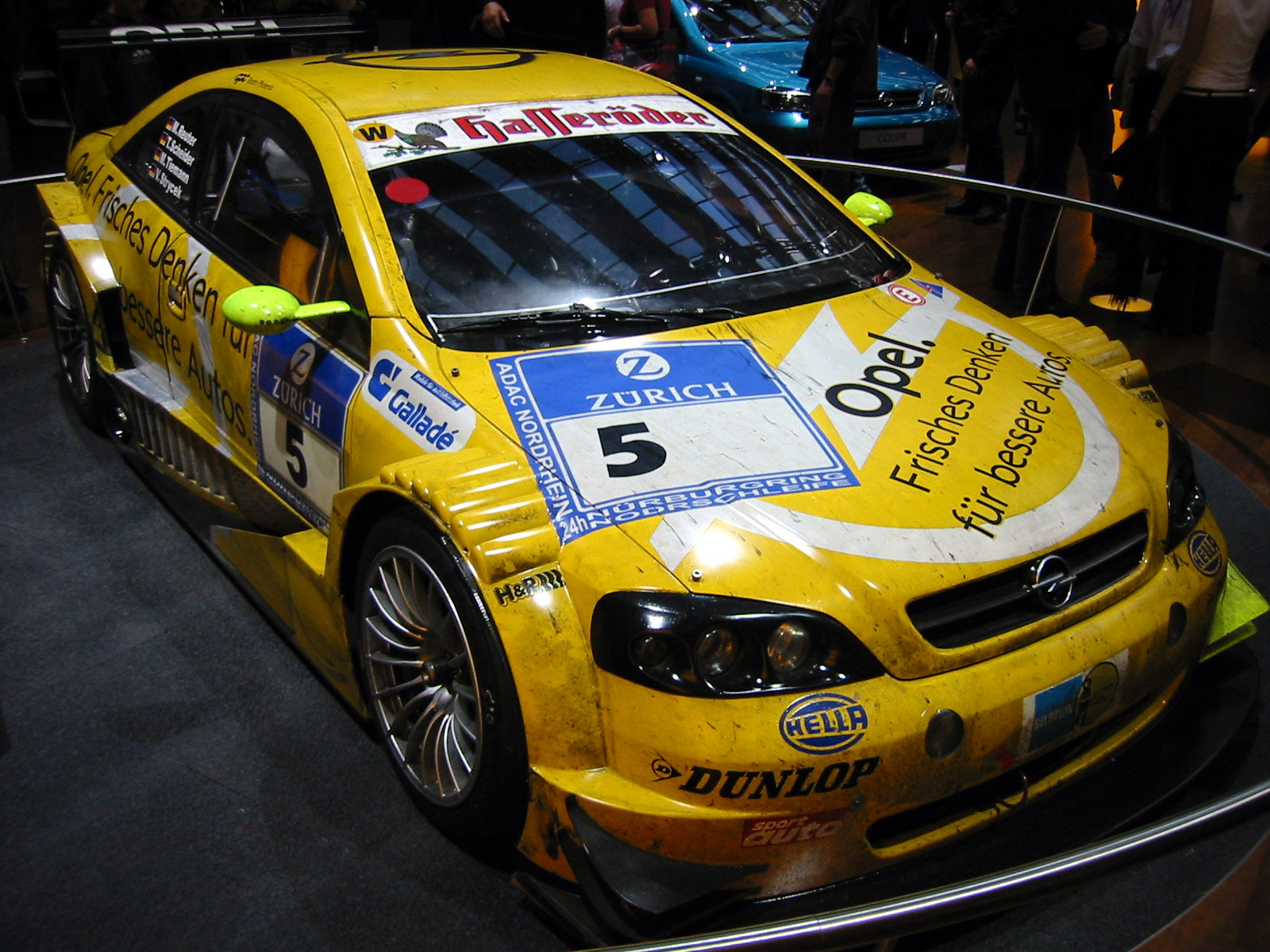
Manuel Reuter's Nürburgring 24h winning Astra which formerly competed in the DTM.

An Astra won the Andros Trophy for three consecutive years starting in 2000.

The Astra Coupé in BTC-T form was dominant in the British Touring Car Championship from 2001 until 2004, and it continued to compete in the series until 2006.

An Astra was used in the 1994 Super Tourenwagen Cup season. In 2002, 2003 and 2006, three different drivers were European Rallycross Champions in the Division 2 driving Astras. The 2003, 2004, 2006, 2007 and 2008 runners-up also raced in that car. Christian Ledesma was 2004 TC 2000 champion with an Astra and Matías Rossi took that title in 2006 and 2007.

A rally version of the Astra was built to the FIA 2-Litre World Rally Cup. The car finished second in class on the 1998 Rally of Great Britain, and claimed the British Rally Championship for manufacturers in 2000.

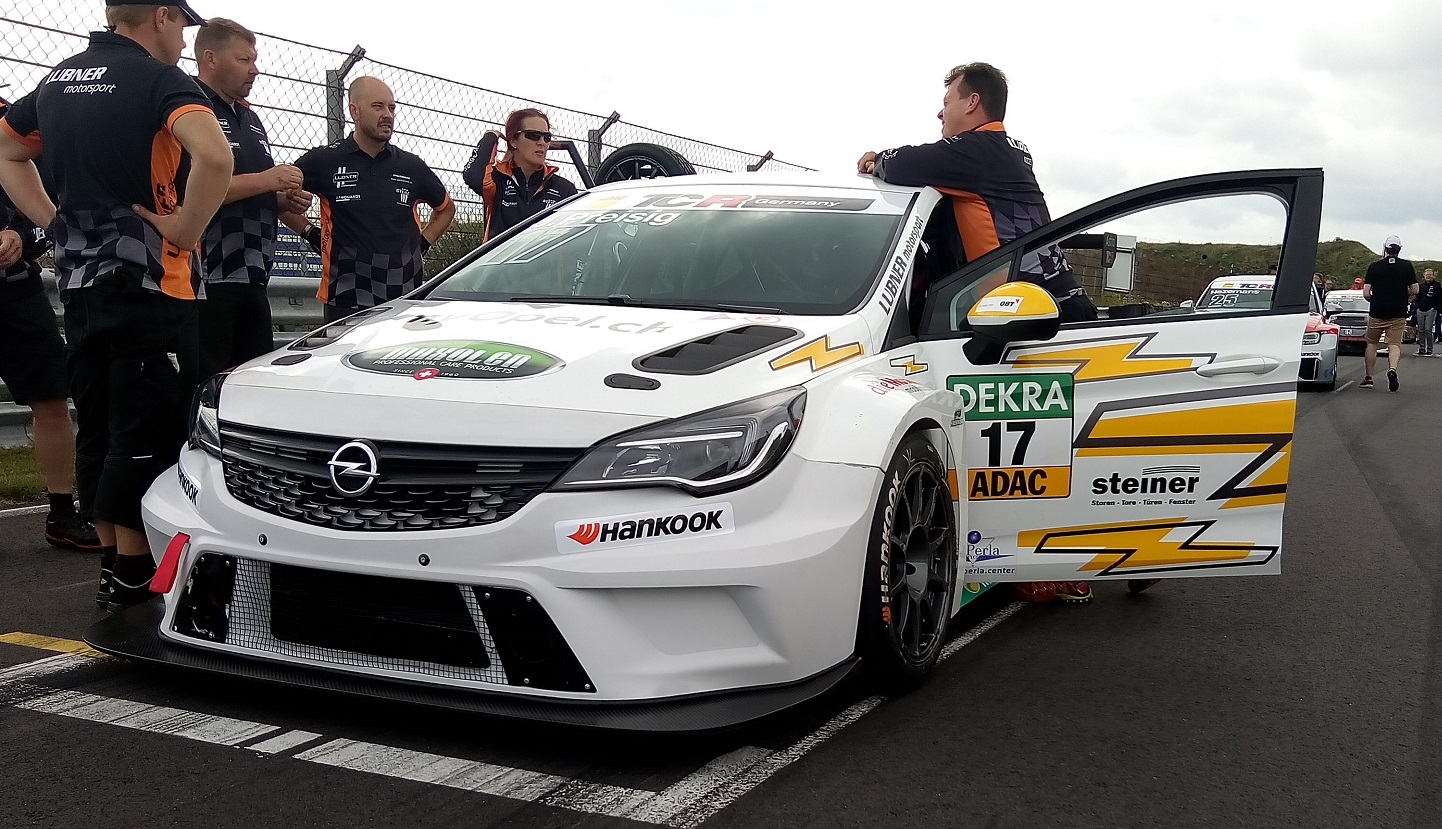
The Opel Astra TCR which competed in the TCR German Series.

The Astra has been used in the shape of silhouette racing cars as well, mainly in the Deutsche Tourenwagen Masters that re-started in 2000, with dedicated V8-powered racing cars under shells that resembled road cars. Manuel Reuter was runner-up in 2000, and an Opel V8 was overall winner of the 2003 Nürburgring 24h race. Astras then raced in the Stock Car Brasil from 2004 to 2008 (Giuliano Losacco won the tournament in 2004 and 2005). In 2009, the Astra G body was replaced in Stock Car Brasil by a Vectra, which is in fact the same as the Astra H.

The car has also been raced in the Russian Touring Car Championship, the 2004 European Touring Car Championship season, the 2006 Swedish Touring Car Championship season, the 2008 European Touring Car Cup and the 2013 European Rallycross Championship season.

== Latin American models (1994–2011) ==
=== Chevrolet Astra ===
The Chevrolet Astra is essentially the same vehicle as the Opel Astra, but with some mechanical differences. In Brazil, the Chevrolet Astra was launched at 1994 as 1995 model only in five-door hatchback and station wagon body styles. It was available only in the GLS trim level with a 2.0-litre, eight-valve multipoint fuel injection engine with a power of 116 PS (85 kW). The plan was to replace the Chevrolet Kadett, an Opel Kadett E built locally, but an increase in taxes for import cars (from 35 to 70 per cent) made General Motors of Brazil stop importing the model for the 1996 model year. The Chevrolet Astra returned in 1998, in second generation and built locally. Initially, it only came in three-door hatchback and four-door sedan body styles, and GL and GLS trim levels. The engine options were a 1.8 litre with 110 PS (81 kW) and a 2.0 litre with 112 PS (82 kW), both with eight valves. Later models received the option of a 2.0 litre, 16-valve engine, initially with a power of 128 PS (94 kW) and later yet with 136 PS (100 kW). The exterior styling featured Vauxhall's new corporate 'V' front grille first seen on the 1994 Vauxhall Omega.

In 2003, the Astra range received an exterior facelift, with a five-door hatchback completing the range. The 1.8 litre engine was discontinued, with a 2.0 litre flexfuel (ethanol and petrol) being launched for the 2004 model year. The 2.0 FlexFuel power was 121–128 PS (89–94 kW) depending on the fuel used; later this changed to 133–140 PS (98–103 kW). A GSI 2.0 16V was launched with the 2003 facelift and produced until 2005. The range did not change much until its discontinuation in 2011, being in effect replaced by the Chevrolet Sonic and Cobalt.

Chile

In Chile, the Astra was sold under the Opel brand until 1997 (replacing the Kadett); beginning in 1999, the second generation was imported from Brazil under the Chevrolet brand. The third generation was again imported from Europe; in 2017, it returned to be sold under Opel brand.

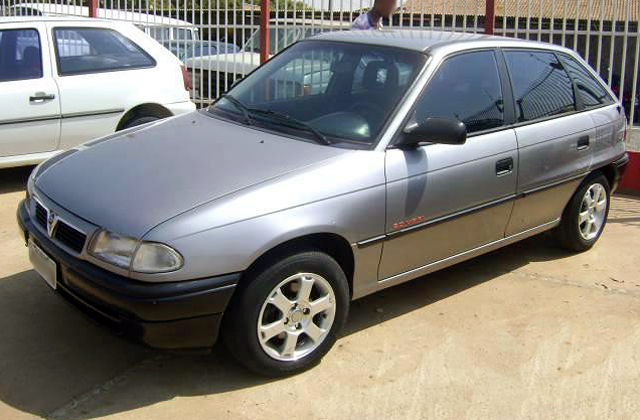
First generation

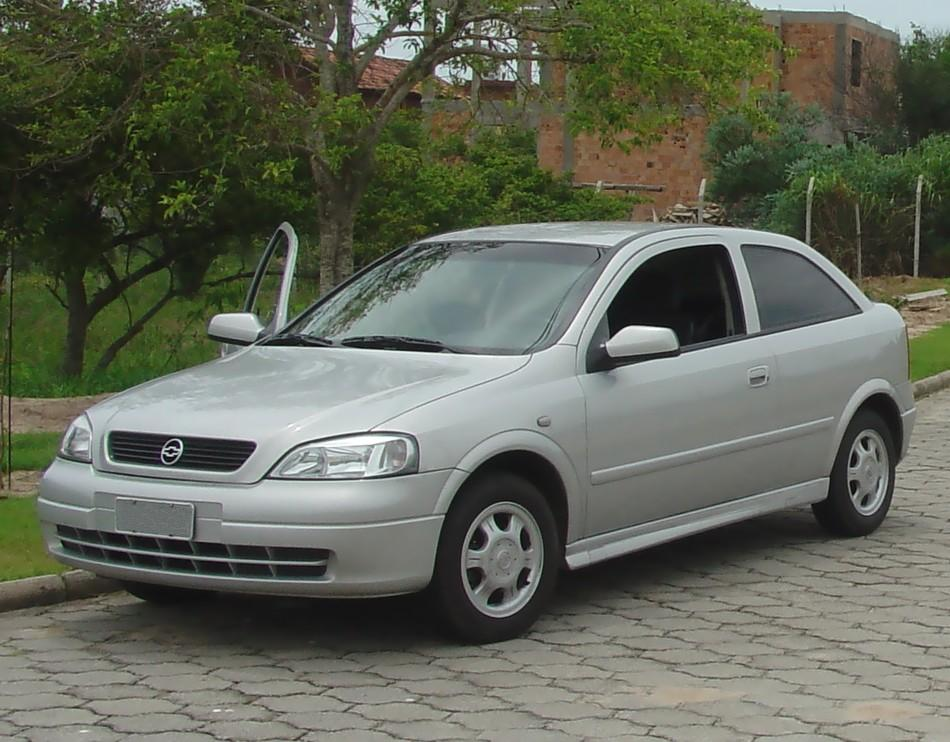
Second generation (pre-facelift)

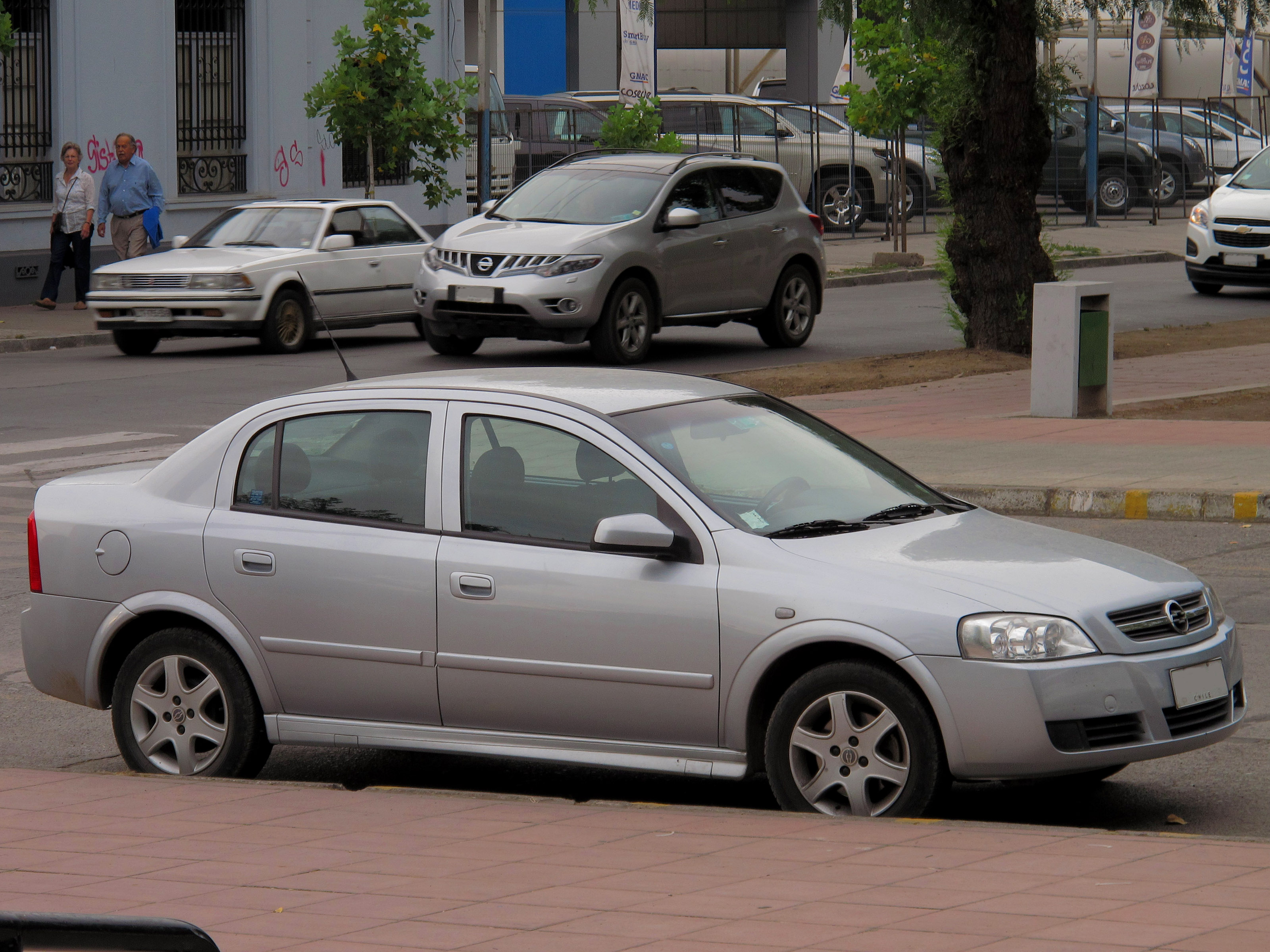
Second generation (facelift)

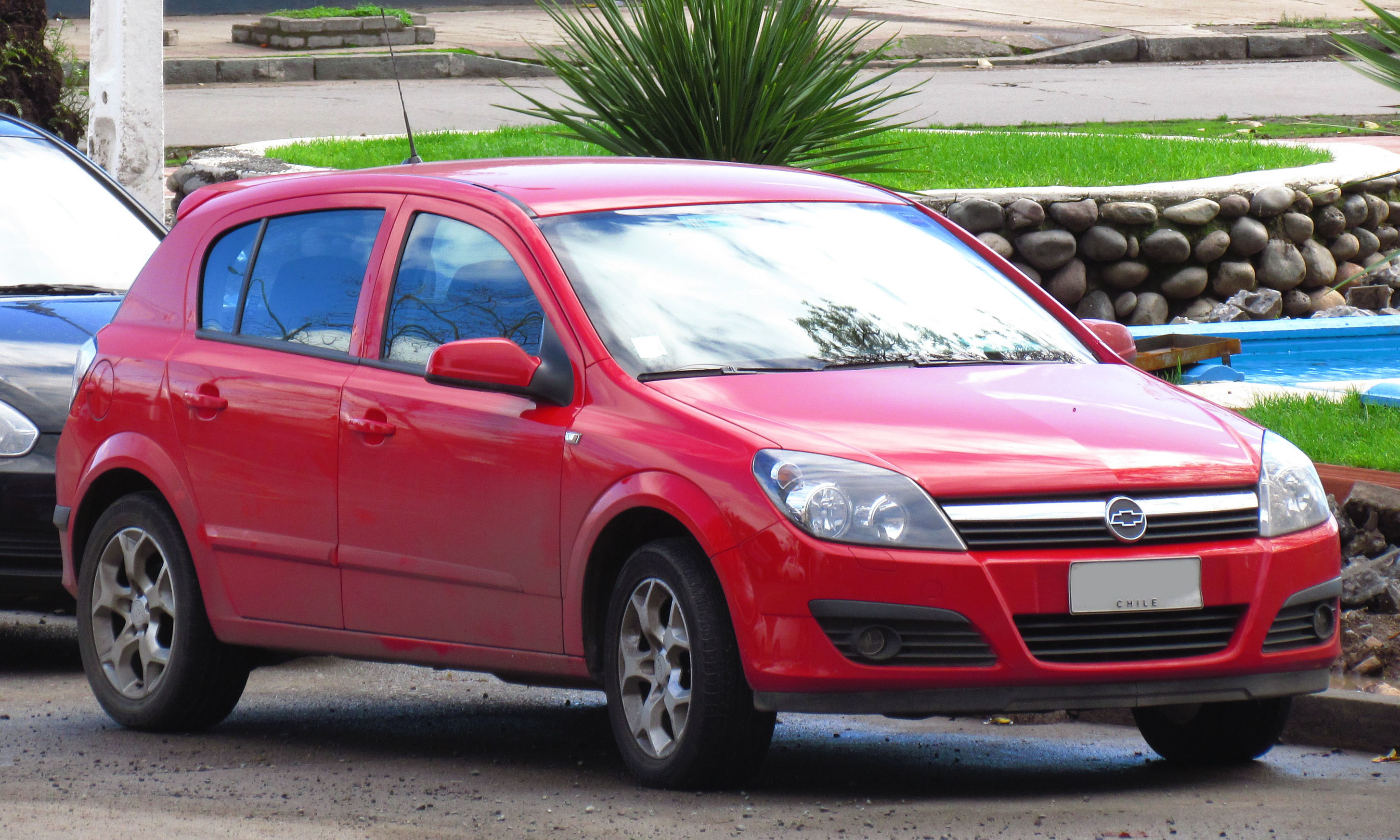
Third generation (Chile)

=== Chevrolet Astra OPC and GSi ===
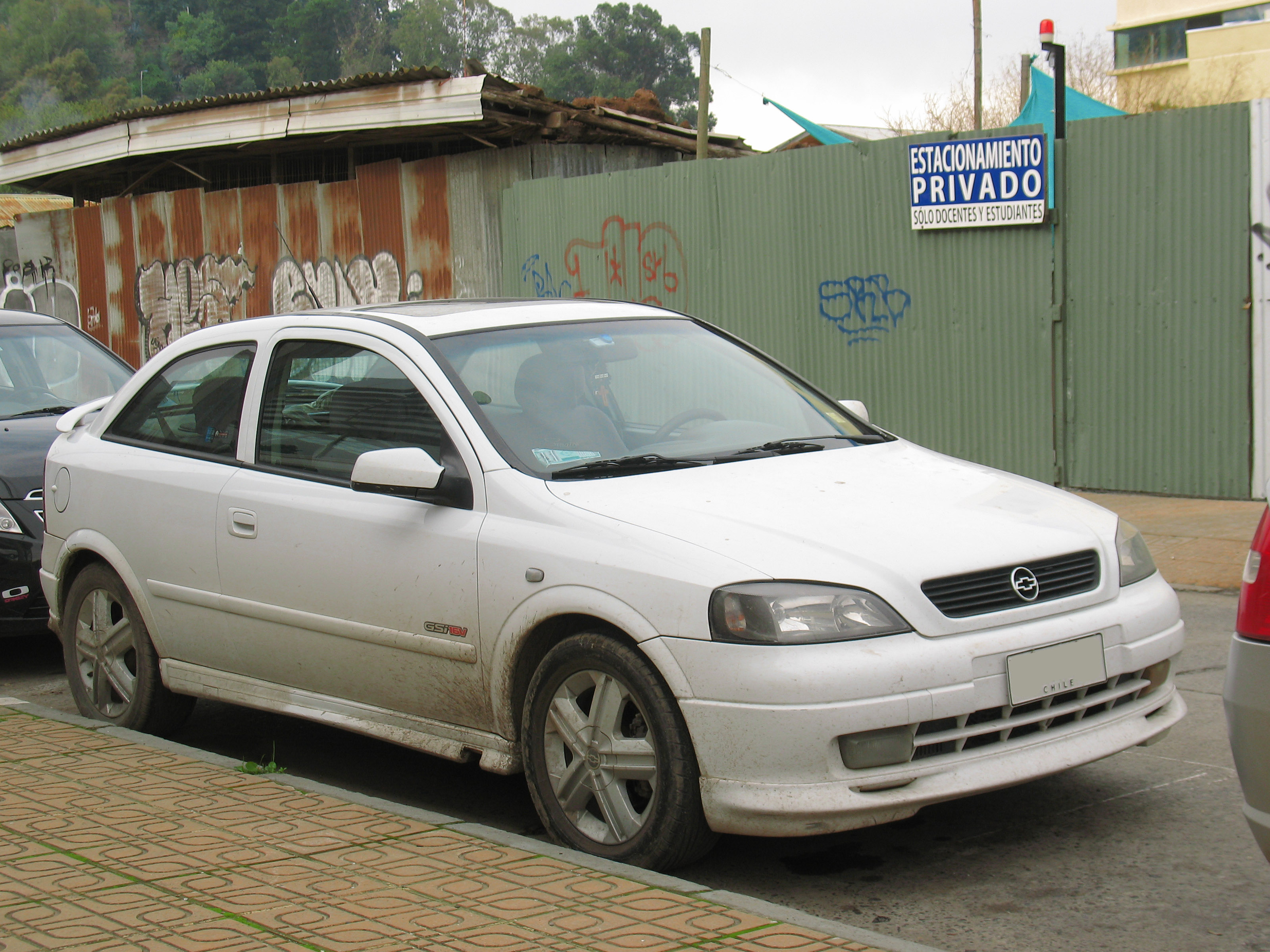
Chevrolet Astra GSi (pre-facelift)

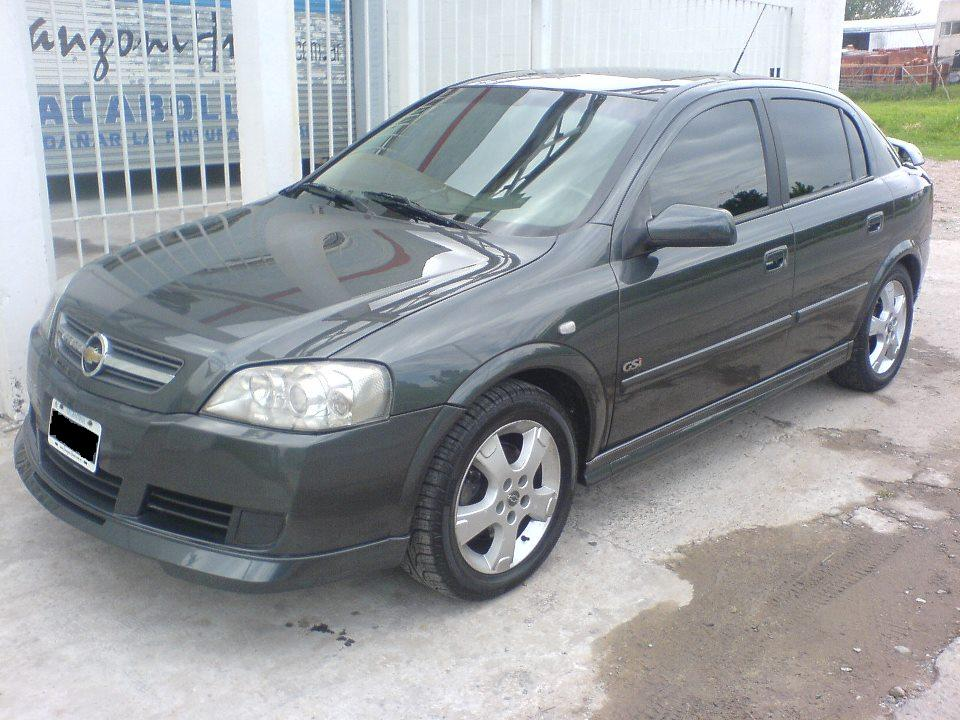
Chevrolet Astra GSi (facelift)

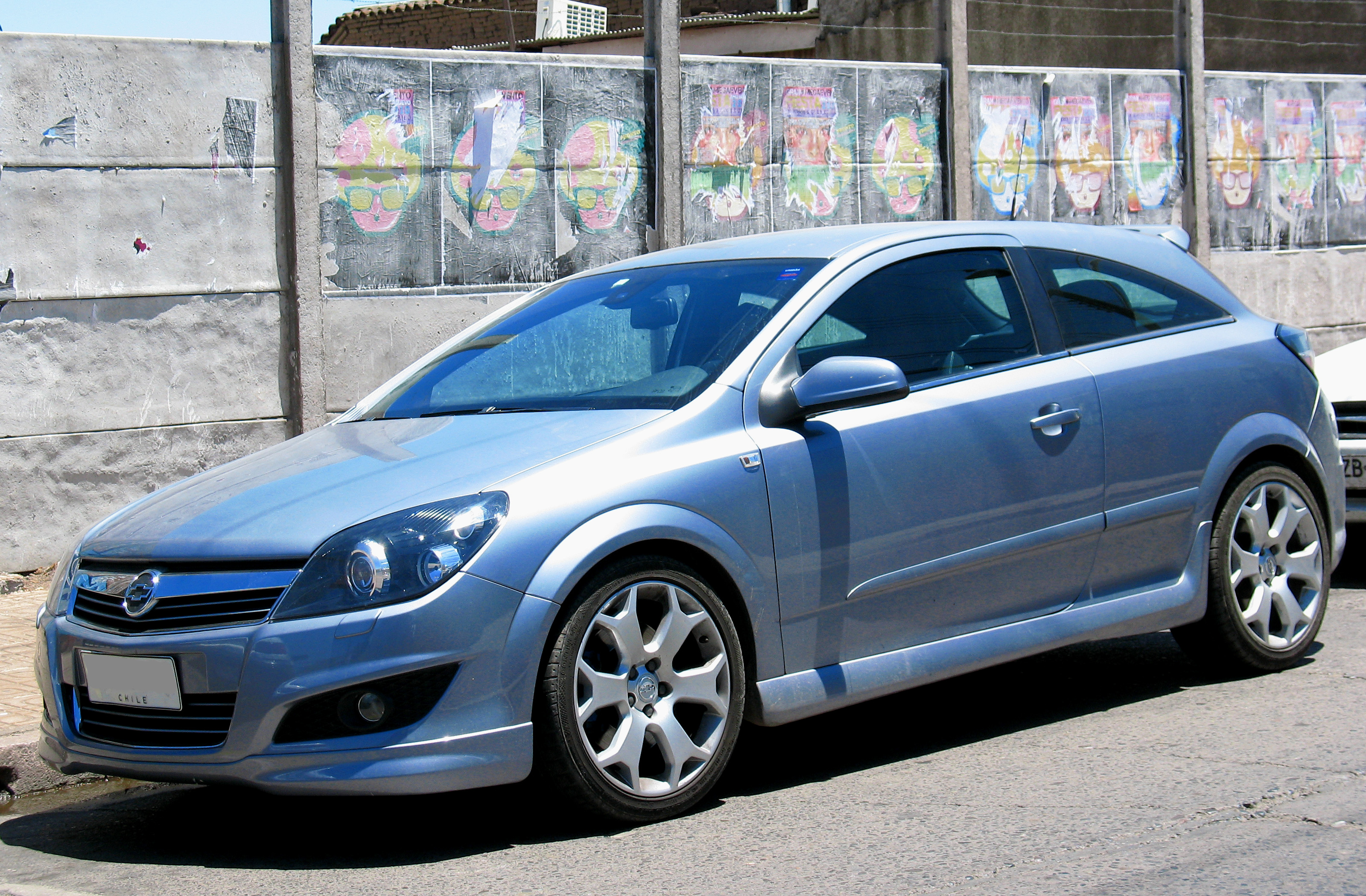
Chevrolet Astra OPC (Chile)

Sales
Year	Brazil (Note: Figures include both the Hatch and Sedan.)
1995	26,884
2001	41,664
2002	36,735
2003	35,857
2004	39,991
2005	35,175
2006	33,889
2007	33,956
2008	32,759
2009	33,517
2010	33,628
2011	24,562
2012	360

=== Chevrolet Vectra (Brazil) ===
Between 2006 and 2011 the Opel Astra H was sold as the Chevrolet Vectra and Vectra GT (hatchback) in Brazil and Argentina, replacing the Vectra B. It shared the powertrain and the platform with the Astra G, except for the optional 2.4-litre petrol engine, and it was inserted above the Astra in both markets. It was replaced by the flagship versions of the Chevrolet Cruze.

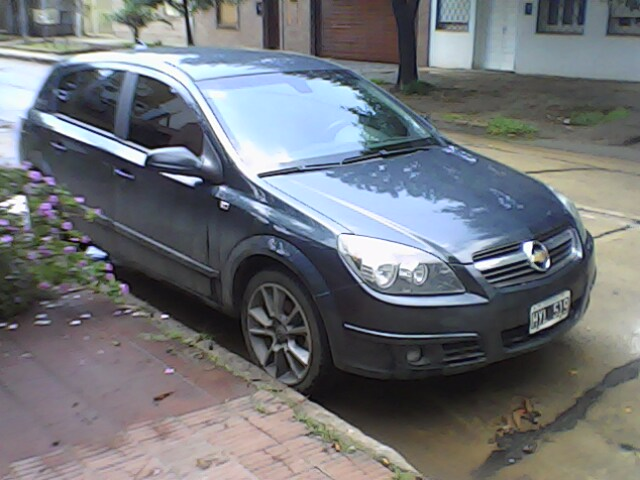
Hatchback (pre-facelift)

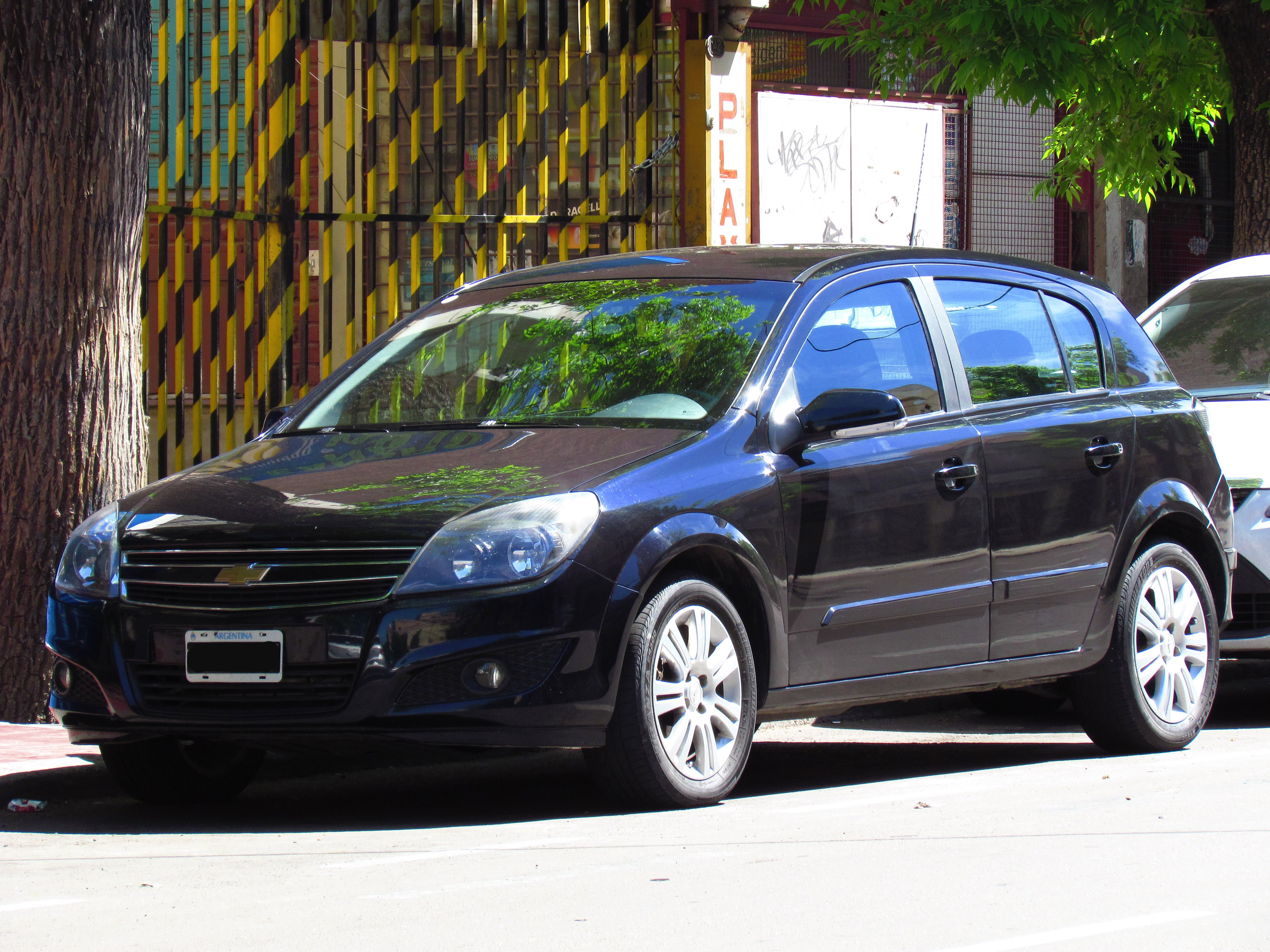
Hatchback (facelift)

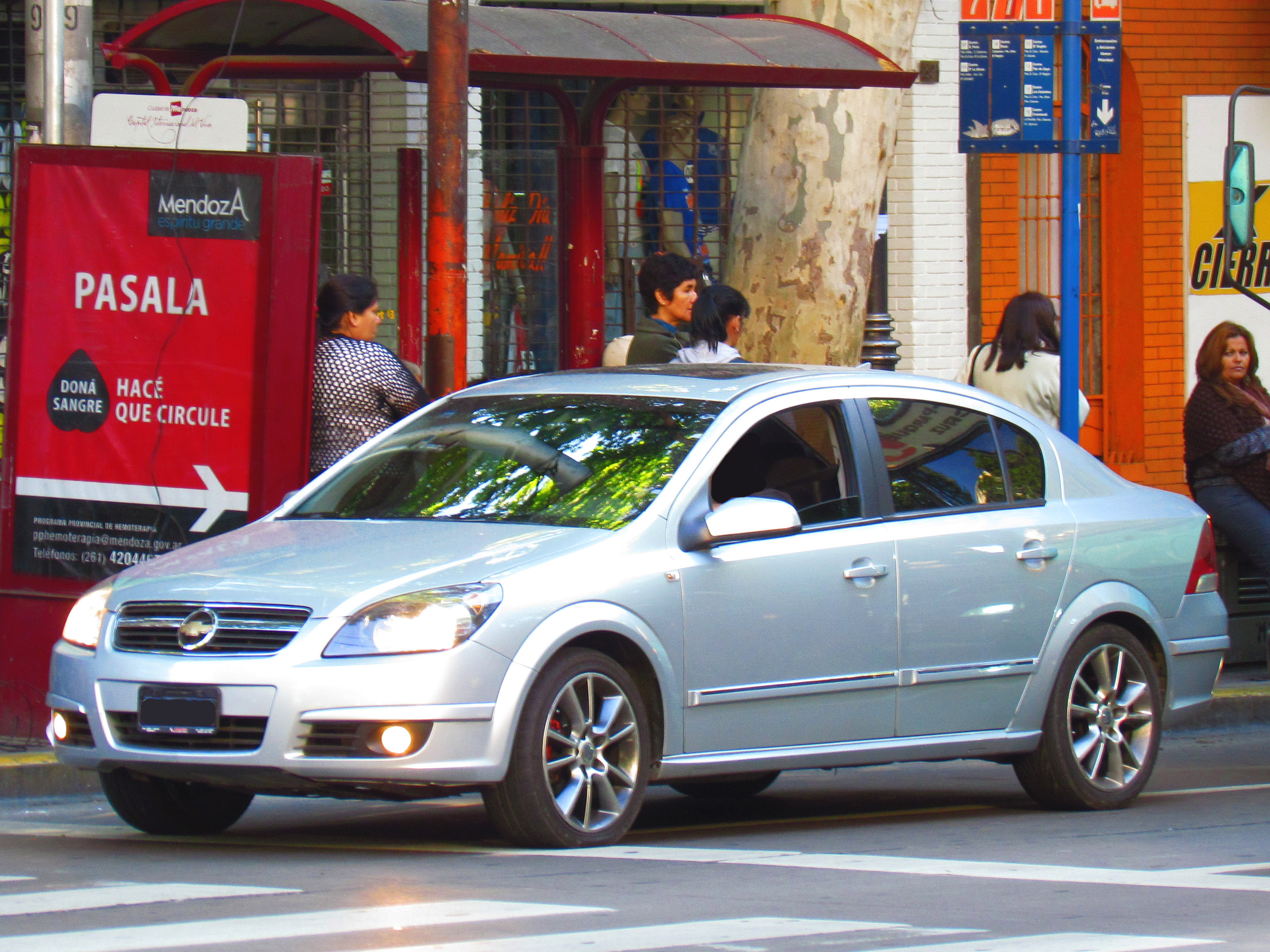
Sedan

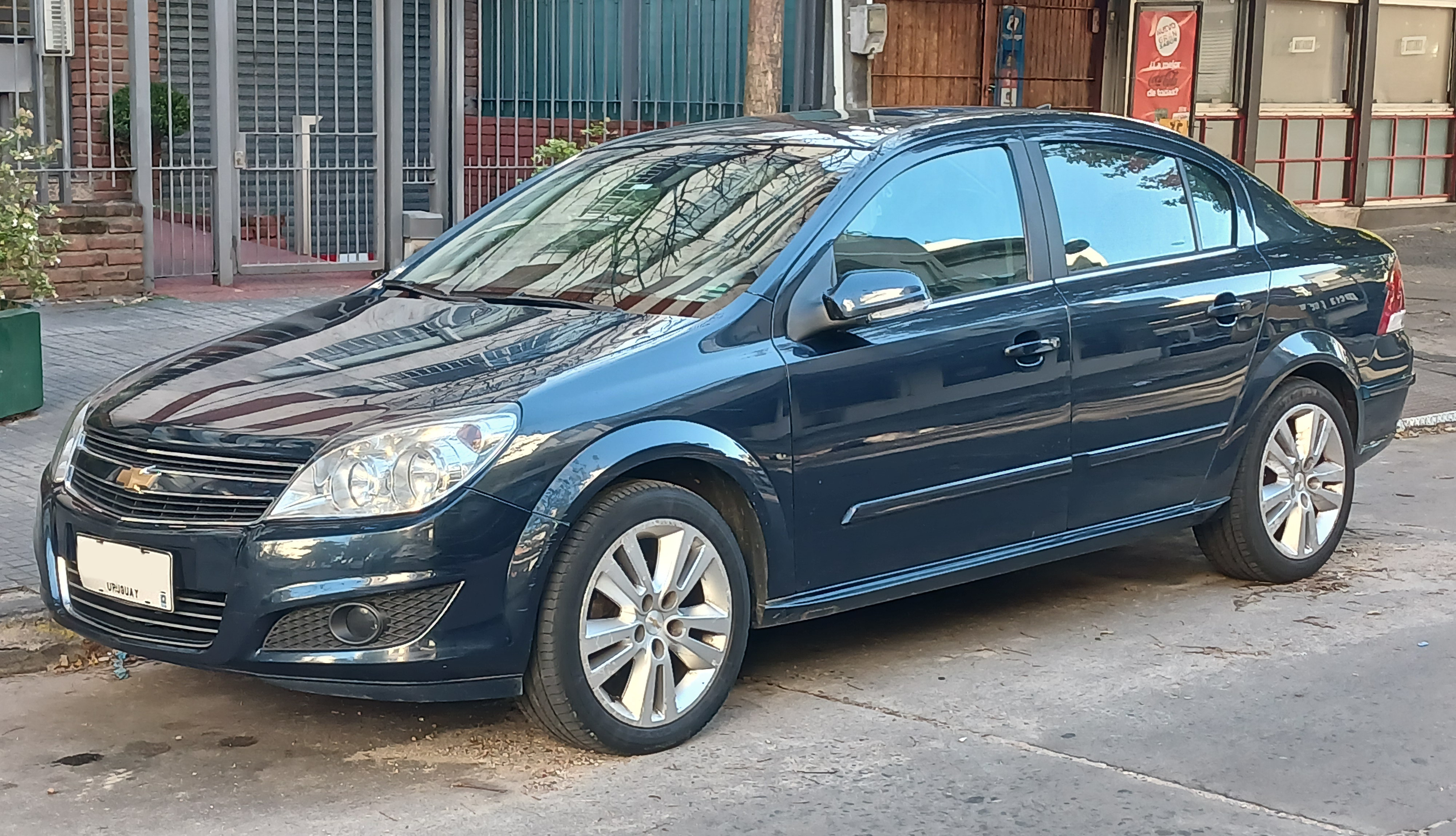
Sedan (front facelift)

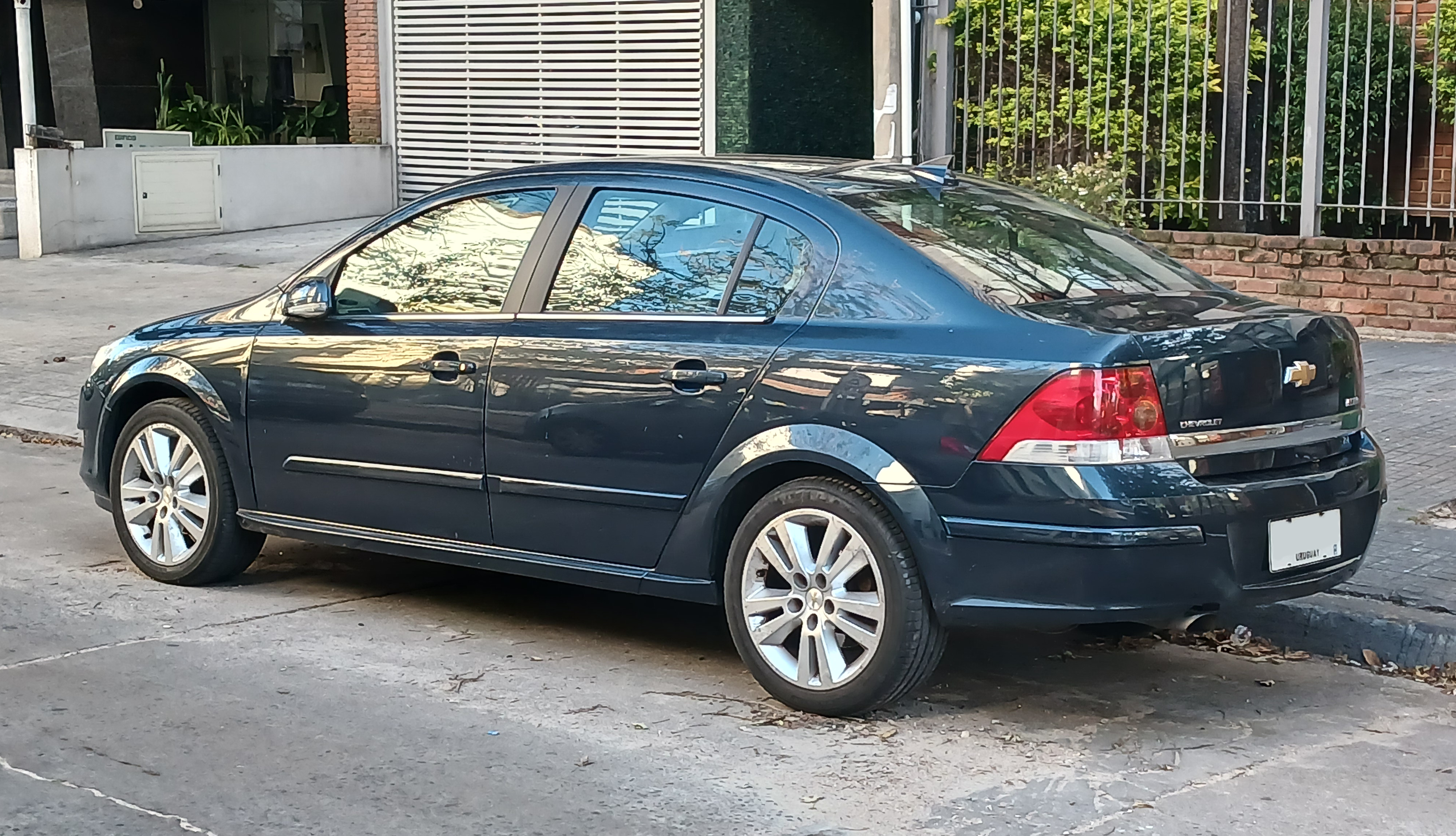
Sedan (rear facelift)

Sales
Year	Brazil (Note: Figures include both the Hatch and Sedan.)
2005	8,484
2006	31,427
2007	33,744
2008	39,568
2009	35,419
2010	30,789
2011	17,815
2012	299
