= Cadillac =

Luxury car manufacturing division of General Motors

Cadillac Motor Car Division
- Trade name: Cadillac
- Formerly: Cadillac Automobile Company
- Type: Division
- Industry: Automotive
- Predecessor: Henry Ford Company
- Founded: August 22, 1902; 124 years ago
- Founders: William Murphy; Lemuel Bowen; Henry M. Leland
- Fate: Acquired by General Motors in 1909
- Headquarters: Detroit, Michigan, United States
- Areas served: United States, Canada, Mexico, Costa Rica, Panama, Dominican Republic, Brazil, Europe (excl. Russia and Belarus), Middle East (excl. Iran and Syria), China (excl. Hong Kong and Macau), South Korea, Japan, Australia, New Zealand
- Key people: Kristian Aquilina, Vice President, Cadillac
- Products: Luxury vehicles
- Parent: General Motors
- Website: cadillac.com

Cadillac Motor Car Division, or simply Cadillac (/ˈkædɪlæk/), is the luxury vehicle division of the American automobile manufacturer General Motors (GM). Its major markets are the United States, Canada, and China; Cadillac models are also distributed in 34 additional markets worldwide. Historically, Cadillac automobiles were at the top of the luxury field within the United States, often competing with Lincoln, but have been outsold by European luxury brands including BMW and Mercedes since the 2000s. In 2019, Cadillac sold 390,458 vehicles worldwide, a record for the brand.

Cadillac, founded in 1902, is among the first automotive brands in the world, fourth in the United States only to Autocar Company (1897) and fellow GM marques Oldsmobile (1897) and Buick (1899). It was named after Antoine de la Mothe Cadillac (1658–1730), the French explorer who founded Detroit, Michigan. The Cadillac crest is based on his coat of arms.

By the time General Motors purchased the company in 1909, Cadillac had already established itself as one of America's premier luxury car makers. The complete interchangeability of its precision parts had laid the foundation for the modern mass production of automobiles. It was at the forefront of technological advances, introducing full electrical systems, the clashless manual transmission, and the steel roof. The brand developed three engines, with its V8 setting the standard for the American automotive industry.

Cadillac had the first U.S. car to win the Royal Automobile Club of the United Kingdom's Dewar Trophy by successfully demonstrating the interchangeability of its component parts during a reliability test in 1908; this spawned the firm's slogan "Standard of the World". It won the trophy again in 1912 for incorporating electric starting and lighting in a production automobile.

GM positions Cadillac as the luxury vehicle brand in its portfolio, above the mainstream Chevrolet and the premium Buick and GMC marques, although many vehicles share underlying platforms.

== History ==
=== Founding ===
Cadillac was formed from the remnants of the Henry Ford Company. After a dispute between Henry Ford and his investors, Ford left the company along with several of his key partners in March 1902. Ford's financial backers William Murphy and Lemuel Bowen called in engineer Henry M. Leland of Leland & Faulconer Manufacturing Company to appraise the plant and equipment in preparation for liquidating the company's assets. Instead, Leland persuaded the pair to continue manufacturing automobiles using Leland's proven single-cylinder engine. A new company called the Cadillac Automobile Company was established on August 22, 1902, converting the Henry Ford Company factory at Cass Street and Amsterdam Avenue. It was named after French explorer Antoine Laumet de La Mothe, sieur de Cadillac, who had founded Detroit in 1701.

=== First automobiles ===
Cadillac's first automobiles, the Runabout and Tonneau, were completed in October 1902. They were two-seat horseless carriages powered by a 10 hp (7 kW) single-cylinder engine. They were practically identical to the 1903 Ford Model A. Many sources say the first car rolled out of the factory on October 17; in the book Henry Leland—Master of Precision, the date is October 20; another reliable source shows car number three to have been built on October 16. Cadillac displayed the new vehicles at the New York Auto Show in January 1903, where they impressed the crowds enough to secure over 2,000 firm orders. Cadillac's biggest selling point was precision manufacturing, and therefore, reliability; a Cadillac was simply a better-made vehicle than its competitors.

Runabout

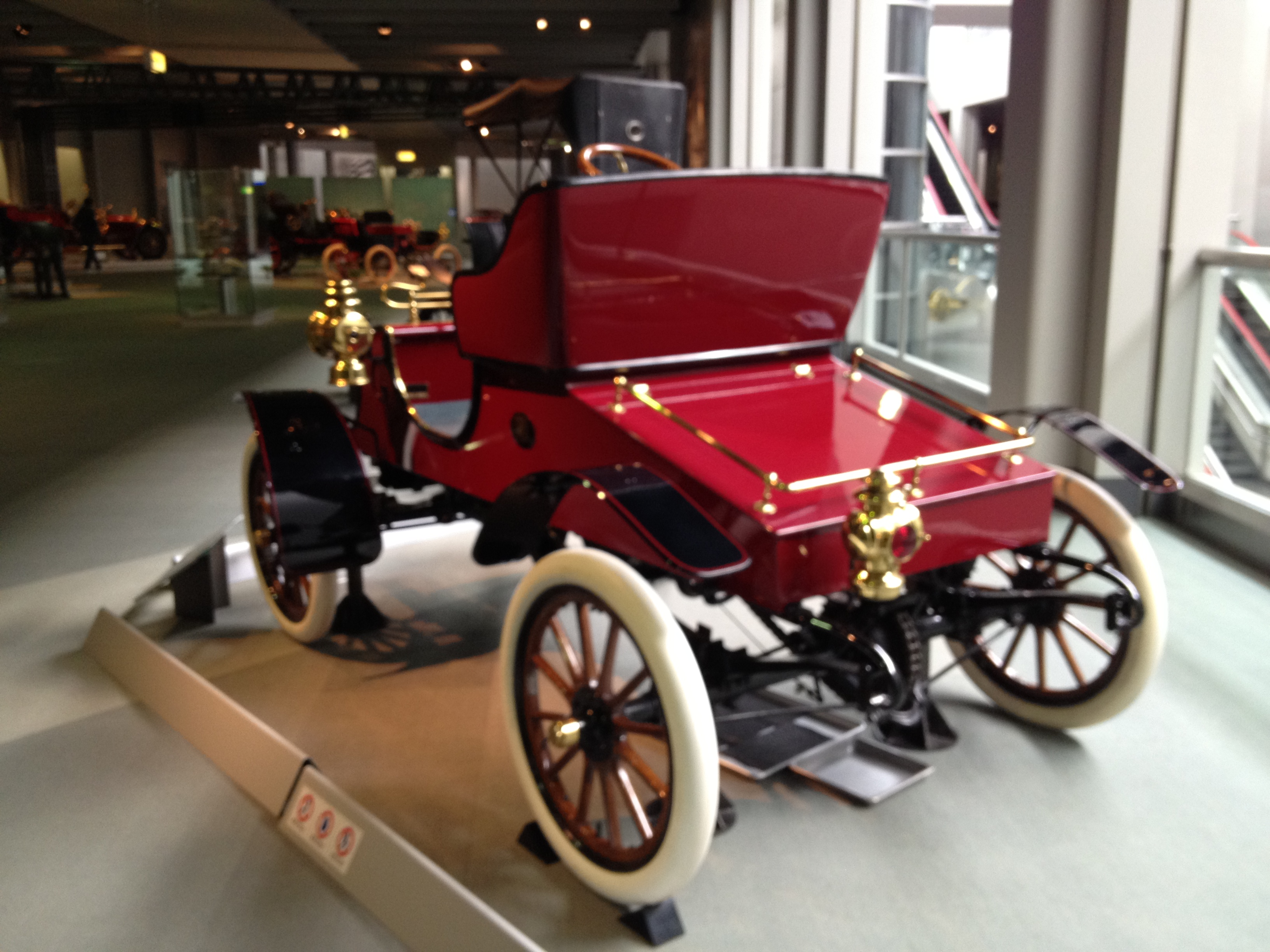
1902

6 1/2 HP 1904

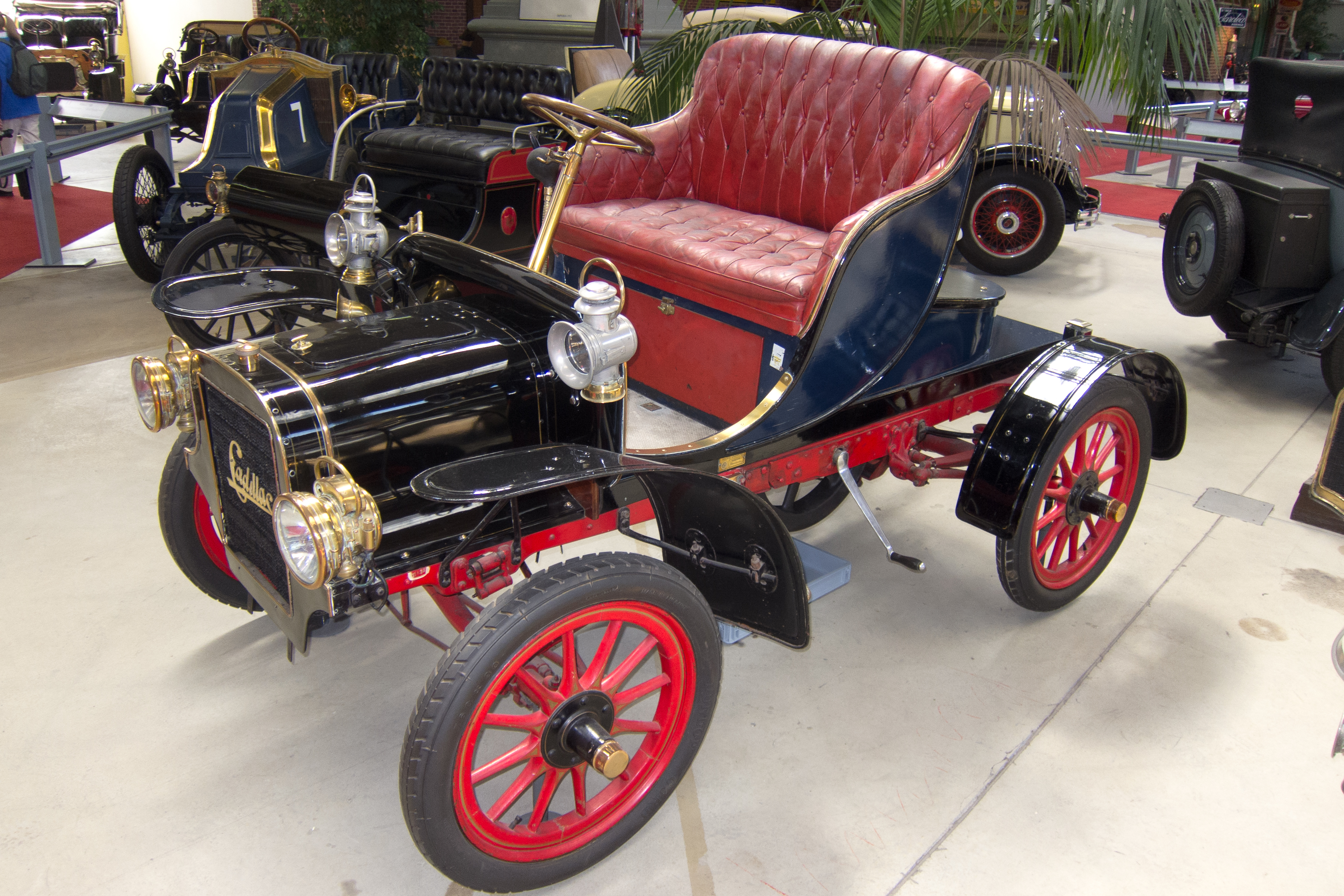
1907

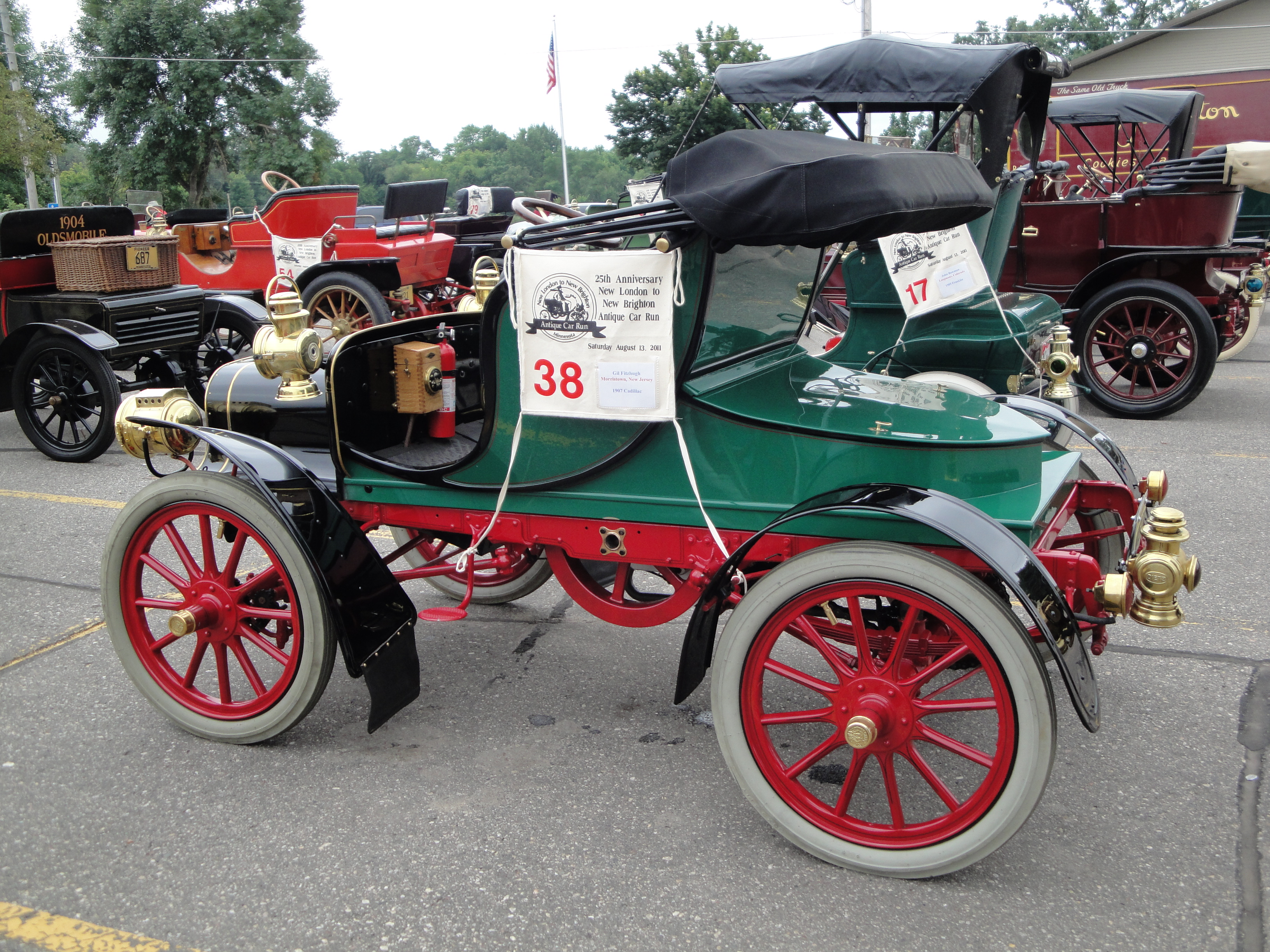
1907

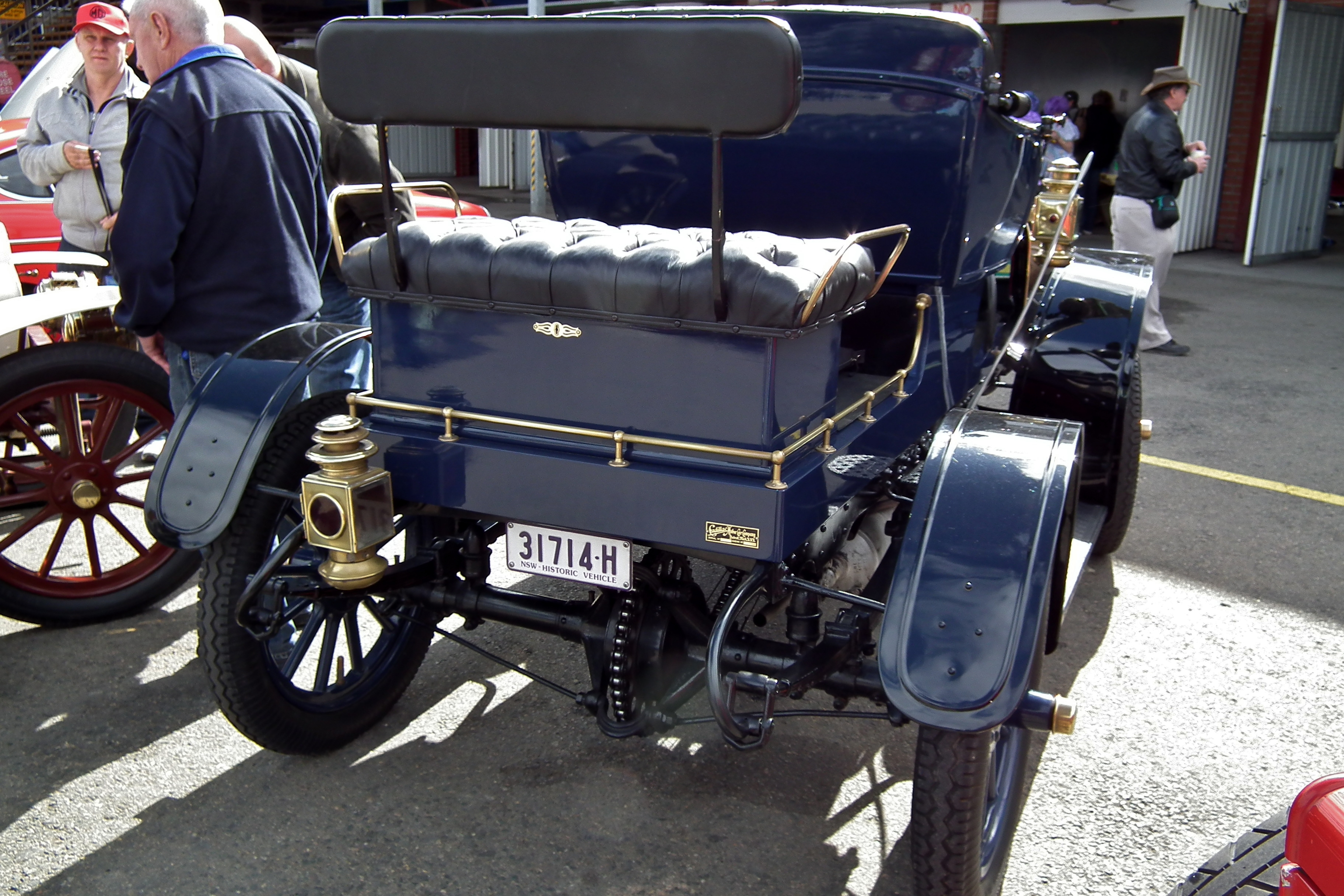
1908 with dickey seat open

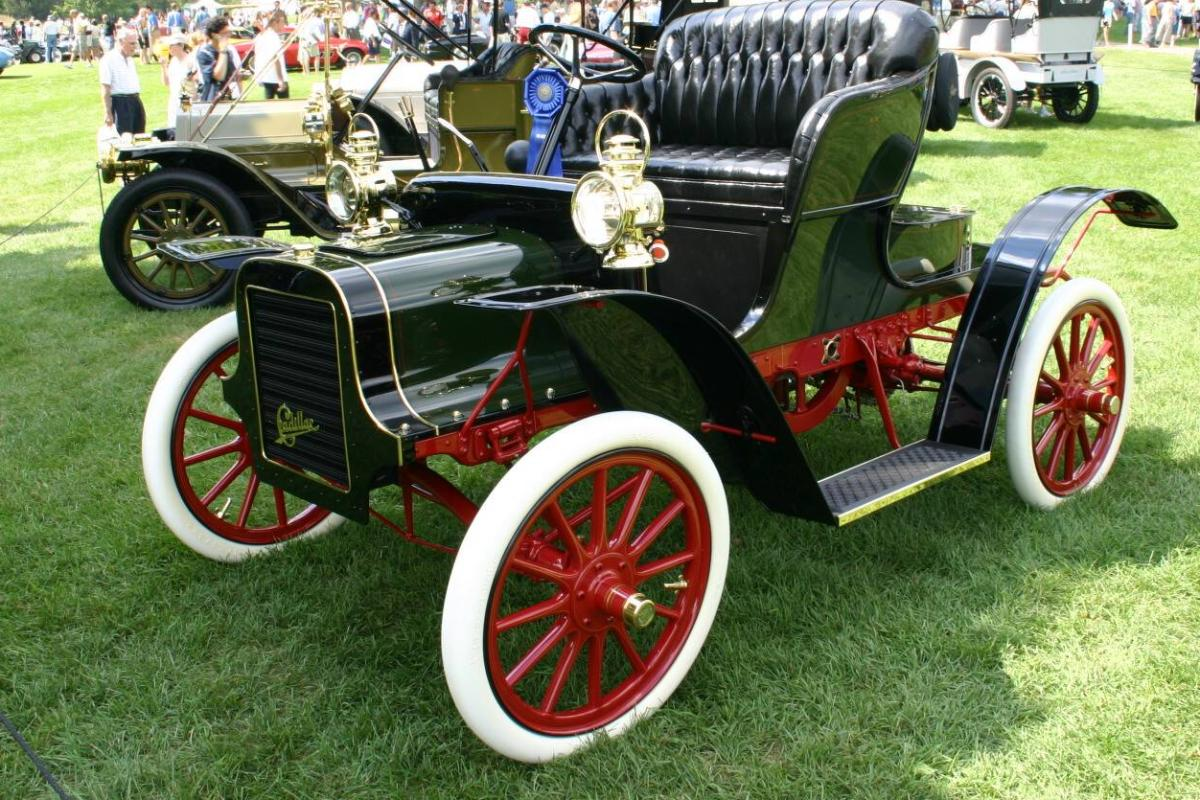
1908 Cadillac Model S
Rear-entrance tonneau

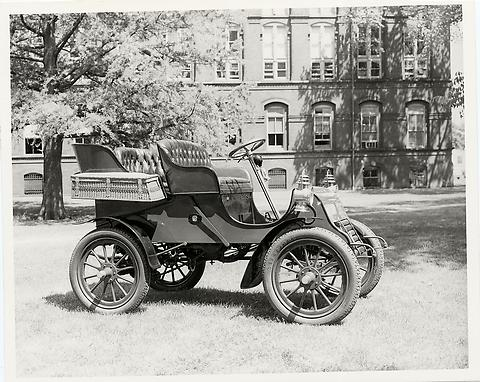
1903

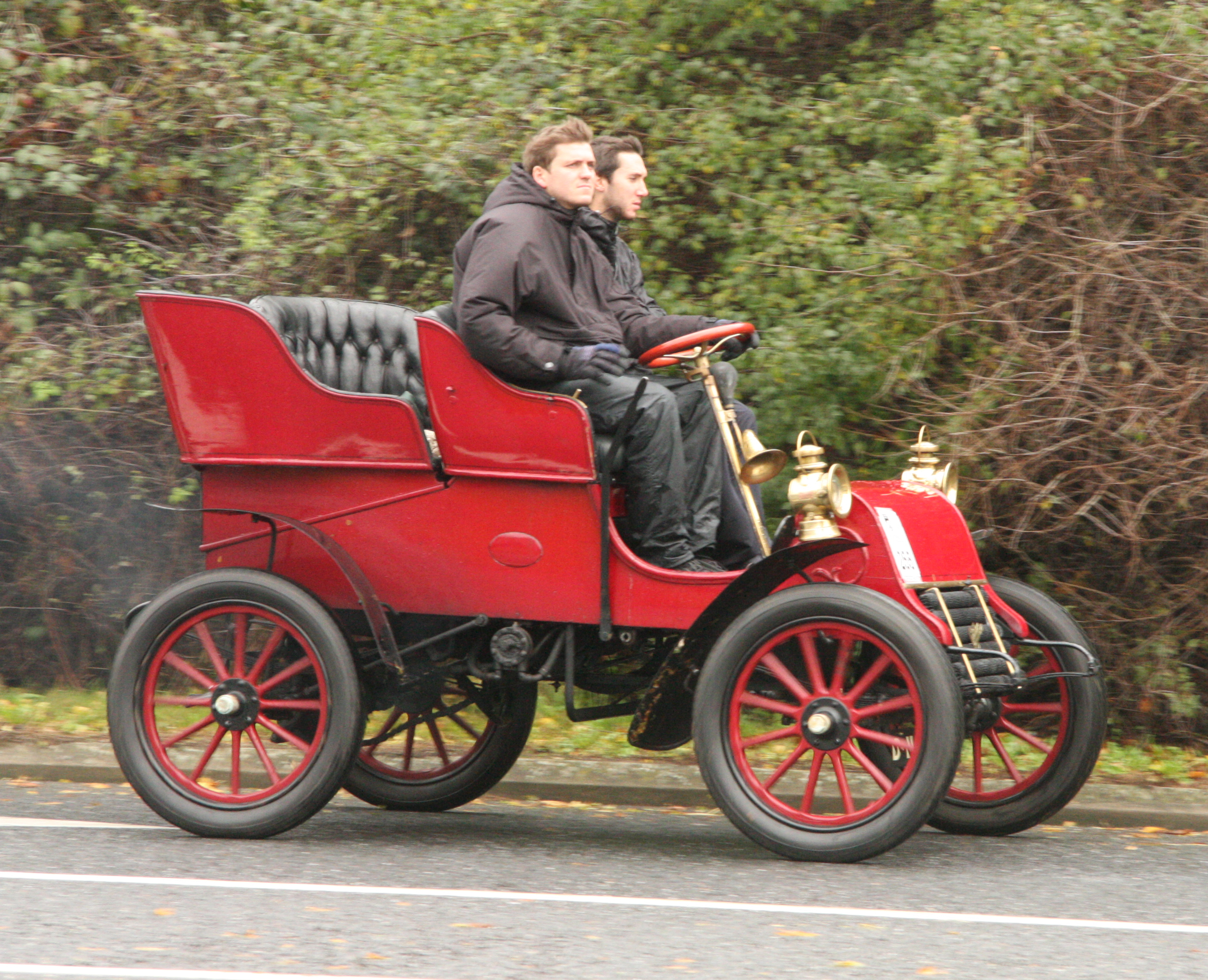
6½ HP 1903

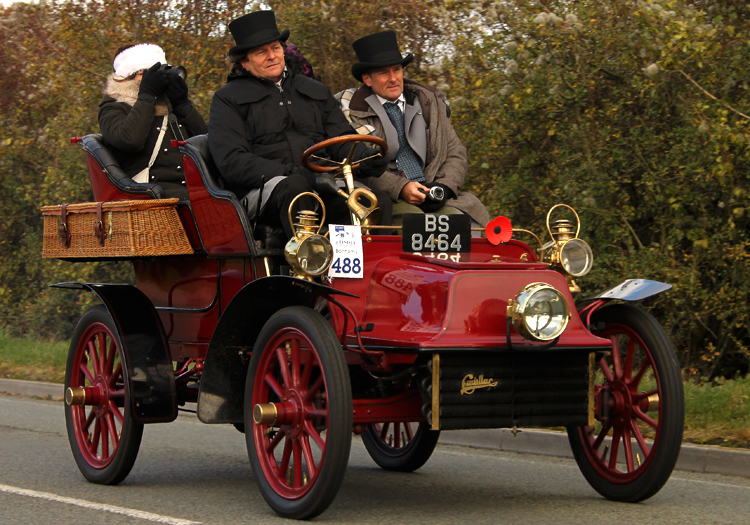
8¼ HP 1904

8 1/4 HP surrey-top 1904

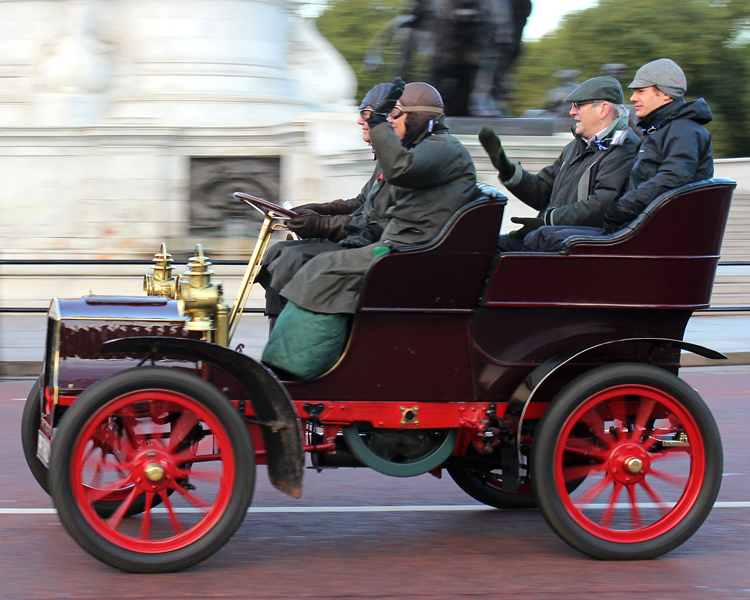
10 HP 1904
Special bodies

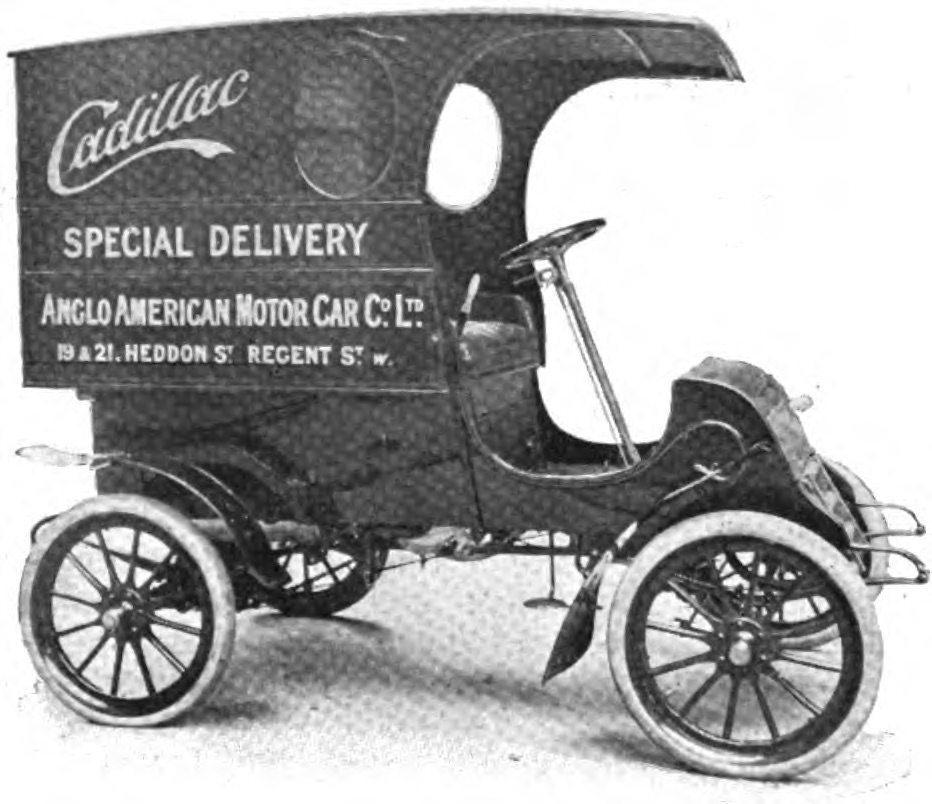
Delivery 1903

8 1/2 HP touring car 1904

8 1/4 HP detachable-top limousine 1904

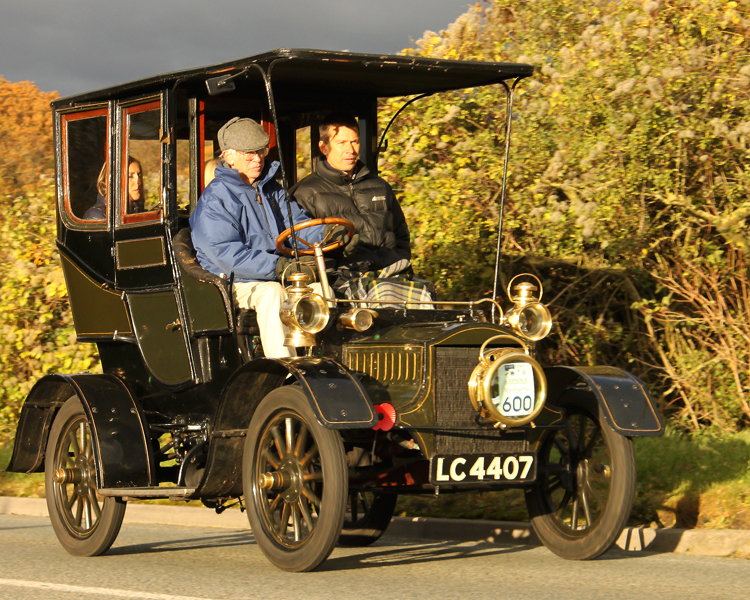
9 HP limousine

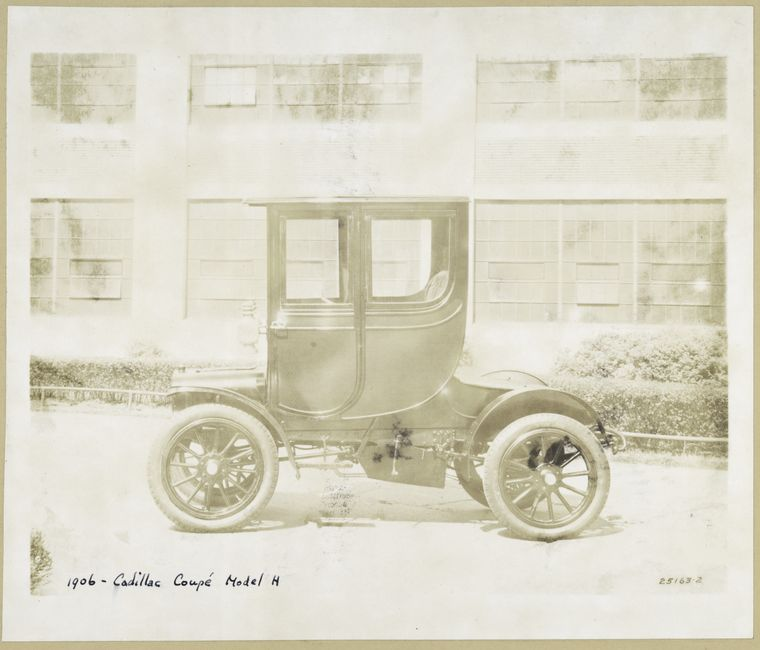
Model M coupé 1907

=== Notable events: 1906–1912 ===
The Cadillac Automobile Company merged with Leland & Faulconer Manufacturing, forming The Cadillac Motor Company in 1905. From its earliest years, Cadillac aimed for precision engineering and stylish luxury finishes, causing its cars to be ranked amongst the finest in the United States. Cadillac was the first volume manufacturer of a fully enclosed car, in 1906. Cadillac participated in the 1908 interchangeability test in the United Kingdom, and was awarded the Dewar Trophy for the most important advancement of the year in the automobile industry.

On July 29, 1909, Cadillac was purchased by the General Motors (GM) conglomerate. Cadillac became General Motors' prestige division, devoted to the production of large luxury vehicles. The Cadillac line was also GM's default marque for "commercial chassis" institutional vehicles, such as limousines, ambulances, hearses and funeral home flower cars, the last three of which were custom-built by aftermarket manufacturers. It became positioned at the top of GM's vehicle hierarchy, above Buick, Oldsmobile, Oakland, and later, Chevrolet.

In 1912, Cadillac was the first automobile manufacturer to incorporate an electrical system enabling starting, ignition, and lighting.

=== Becoming the "Standard of the World" and the Great Depression: 1915–1941 ===
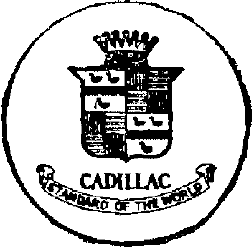
1921 Cadillac logo

In 1915, Cadillac introduced a 90-degree flathead V8 engine with 70 horsepower (52 kW) at 2400 rpm and 180 pound force-feet (240 N⋅m) of torque, allowing its cars to attain 65 miles per hour (105 km/h). This was faster than most roads could accommodate at the time. Cadillac pioneered the dual-plane V8 crankshaft in 1918. In 1928, Cadillac introduced the first clashless Synchro-Mesh manual transmission, utilizing constant mesh gears. In 1930, Cadillac implemented the first V-16 engine, with a 45-degree overhead valve, 452 cubic inches (7.41 litres), and 165 horsepower (123 kW), one of the most powerful and quietest engines in the United States. The development and introduction of the V8, V16 and V12 helped to make Cadillac the "Standard of the World". A later model of the V8 engine, with overhead valves, set the standard for the entire American automotive industry in 1949.

In July 1917, the United States Army needed a dependable staff car and chose the Cadillac Type 55 Touring Model after exhaustive tests on the Mexican border; 2,350 of the cars were supplied for use in France by officers of the American Expeditionary Force in World War I.

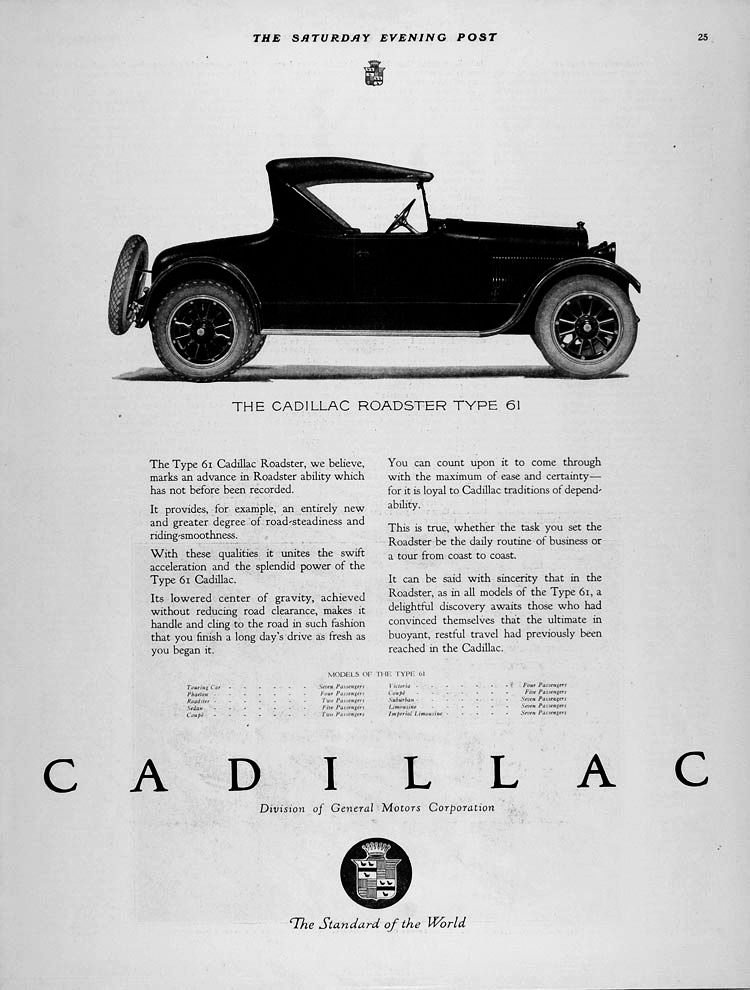
A 1921 Cadillac advertisement

General Motors of Canada had built Cadillacs from 1923 until 1936 and LaSalles from 1927 until 1935.

Pre–World War II Cadillacs were well-built, powerful, mass-produced luxury cars aimed at an upper-class market. In the 1930s, Cadillac added cars with V12 and V16 engines to their range, many of which were fitted with custom coach-built bodies.

In the 1920s and 1930s, Cadillac and Buick vehicles were popular with longer-distance passenger service operators, e.g., the Nairn Transport Company in the Middle East (Baghdad–Damascus) and Newmans Coach Lines in New Zealand.

In 1926, Cadillac recruited automobile stylist Harley Earl in a one-time consulting capacity, but his employment lasted considerably longer: by 1928, Earl was the head of the new Art and Color division and he would ultimately work for GM until he retired, over 30 years later. The first car he designed was the LaSalle, a new, smaller "companion marque" car, named after another French explorer and founder of Detroit, René Robert Cavelier, Sieur de La Salle. That marque remained in production until 1940.

Cadillac introduced designer-styled bodywork (as opposed to auto-engineered) in 1927. It installed shatter-resistant glass in 1926. Cadillac also introduced the "turret top", the first all-steel roof on a passenger car. Previously, car roofs had been made out of fabric-covered wood.

The Great Depression sapped the auto industry generally, with the luxury market declining more steeply; between 1928 and 1933, Cadillac sales declined by 84% to 6,736 vehicles. Exacerbating sales performance for the Cadillac brand was a policy, reflective of the times, which discouraged sales to African Americans. Nick Dreystadt, mechanic and national head of Cadillac service, urged a committee—set up to decide whether the Cadillac brand would live on—to revoke that policy. After the policy was eliminated, brand sales increased by 70% in 1934, and Dreystadt was promoted to lead the entire Cadillac Division.

By 1940, Cadillac sales had risen tenfold compared to 1934. In 1936, Dreystadt released the Series 60 as Cadillac's entry into the mid-priced vehicle market. It was replaced by the Series 61 in 1939, but a popular model that was derived from it, the Sixty Special, continued through 1993. Another factor helped boost Cadillac growth over the next few years: a revolution in assembly-line technology. In 1934, Henry F. Phillips introduced the Phillips screw and screwdriver to the market. He entered into talks with General Motors and convinced the Cadillac group his new screws would speed assembly times and therefore increase profits. Cadillac was the first automaker to use the Phillips technology, in 1937, which was widely adopted in 1940. In 1941, for the first time in many years, all cars built by the company shared the same basic engine and drivetrain. The same year also saw the introduction of optional Hydra-Matic, the first mass-produced fully automatic transmission, offered the previous year on the Oldsmobile.

Cadillac Becomes Part of General Motors

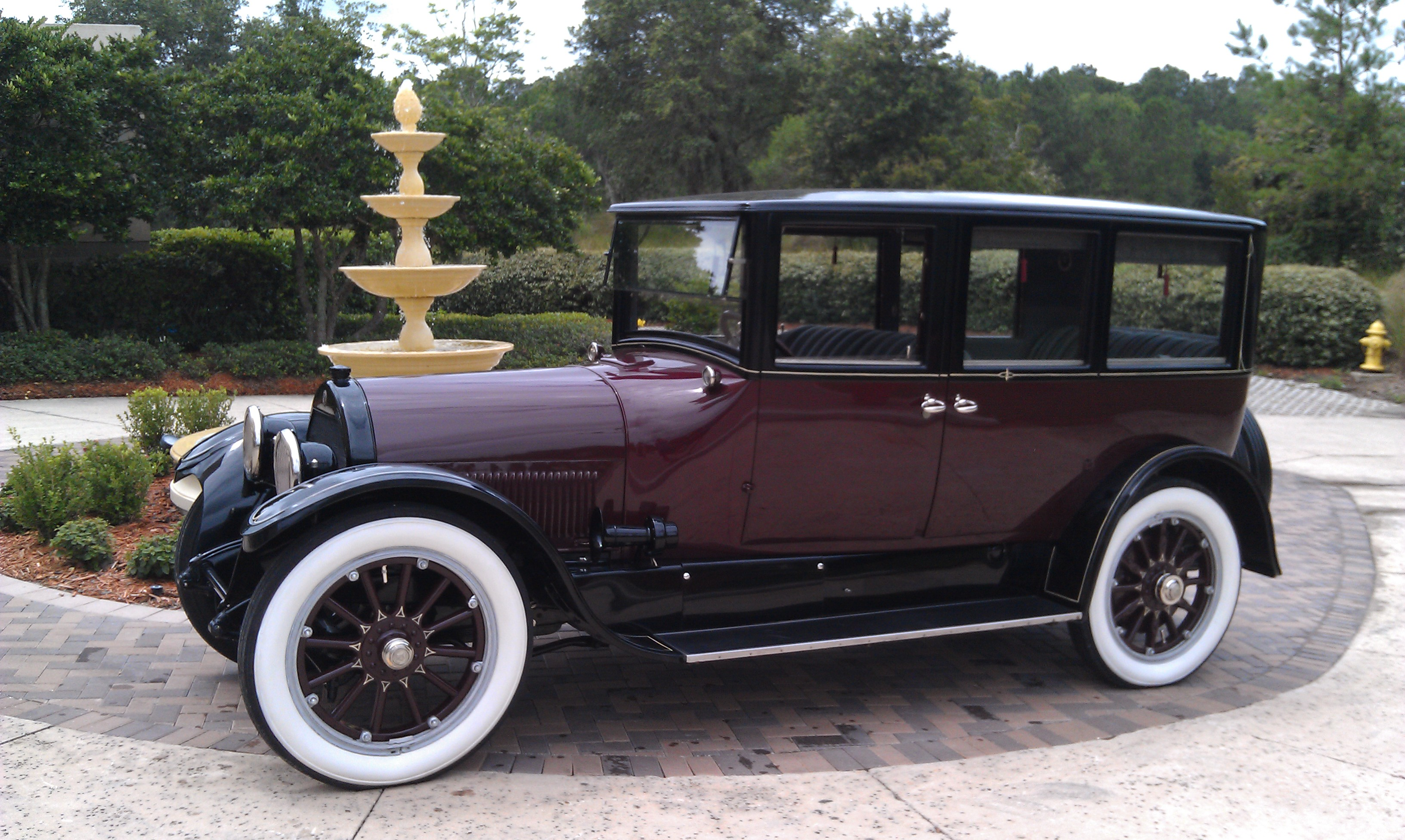
1921 Cadillac Suburban

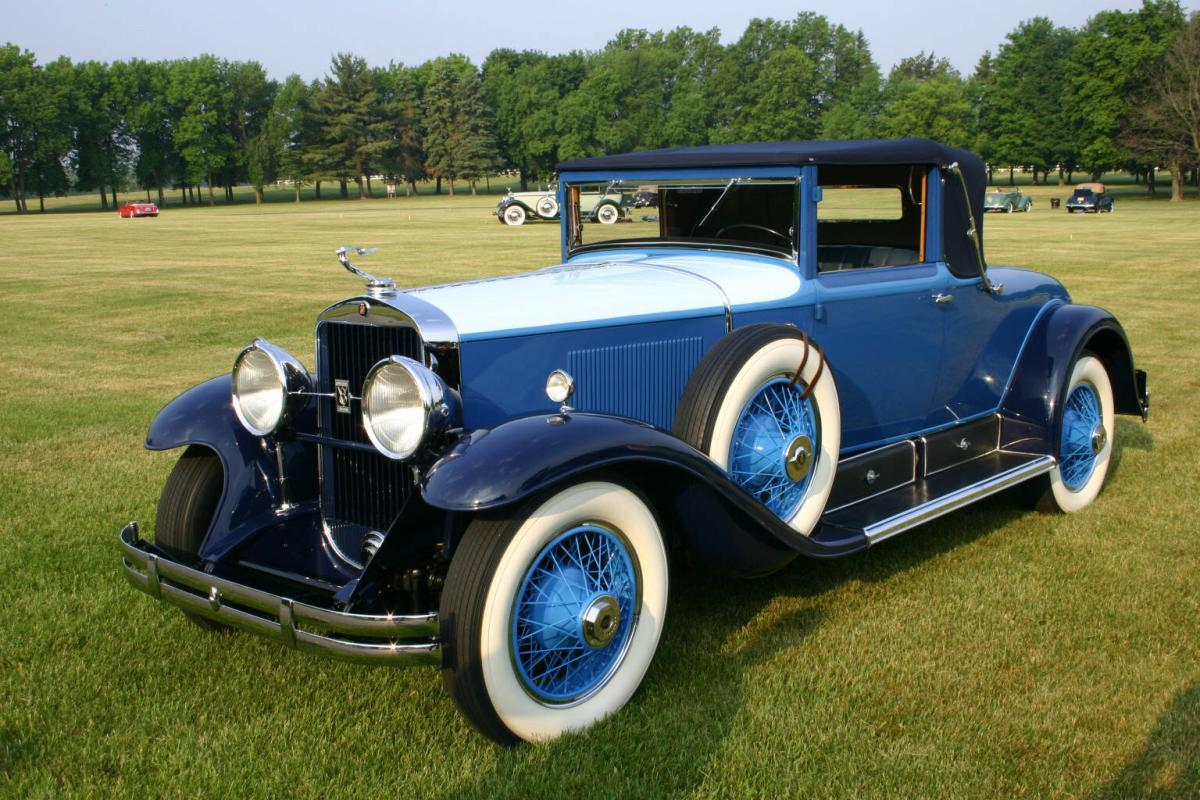
1929 Cadillac

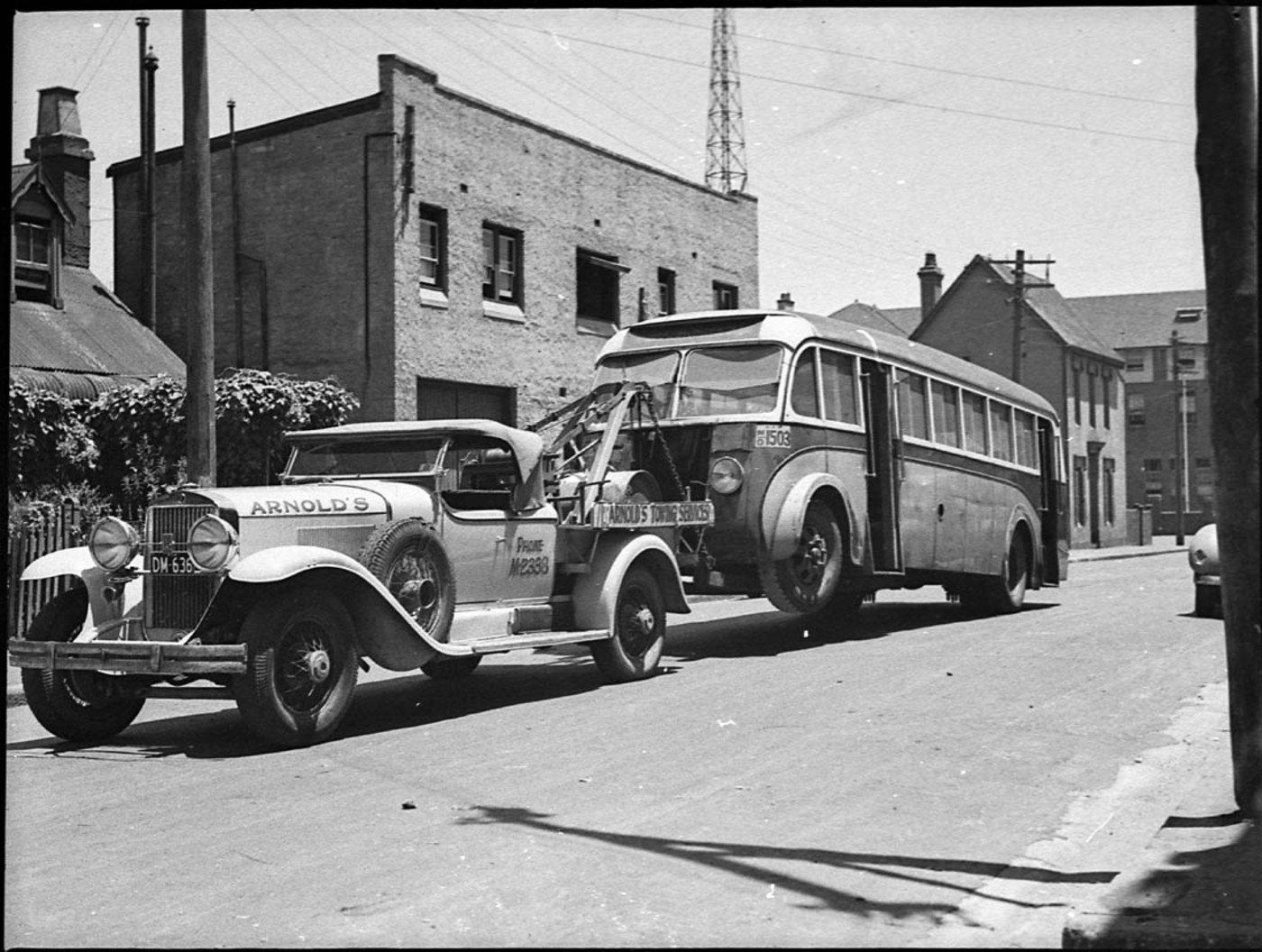
1929 Cadillac towing a bus, Sydney, Australia, 1938

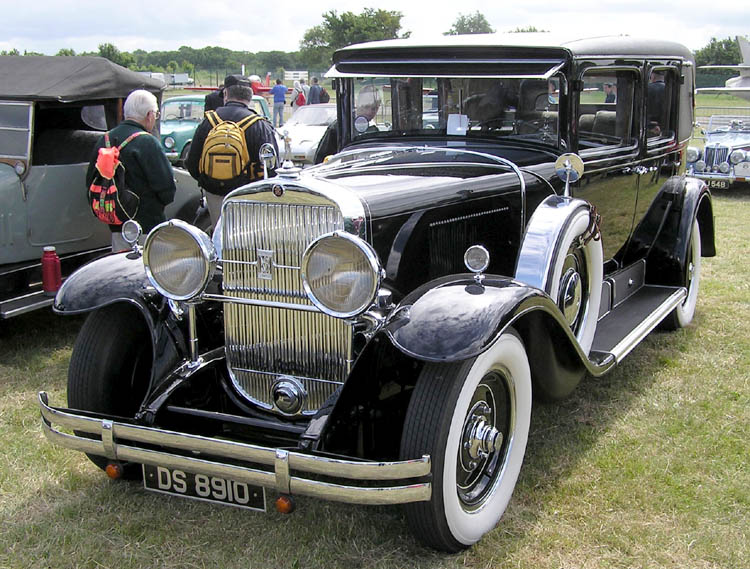
1929 Cadillac Fleetwood

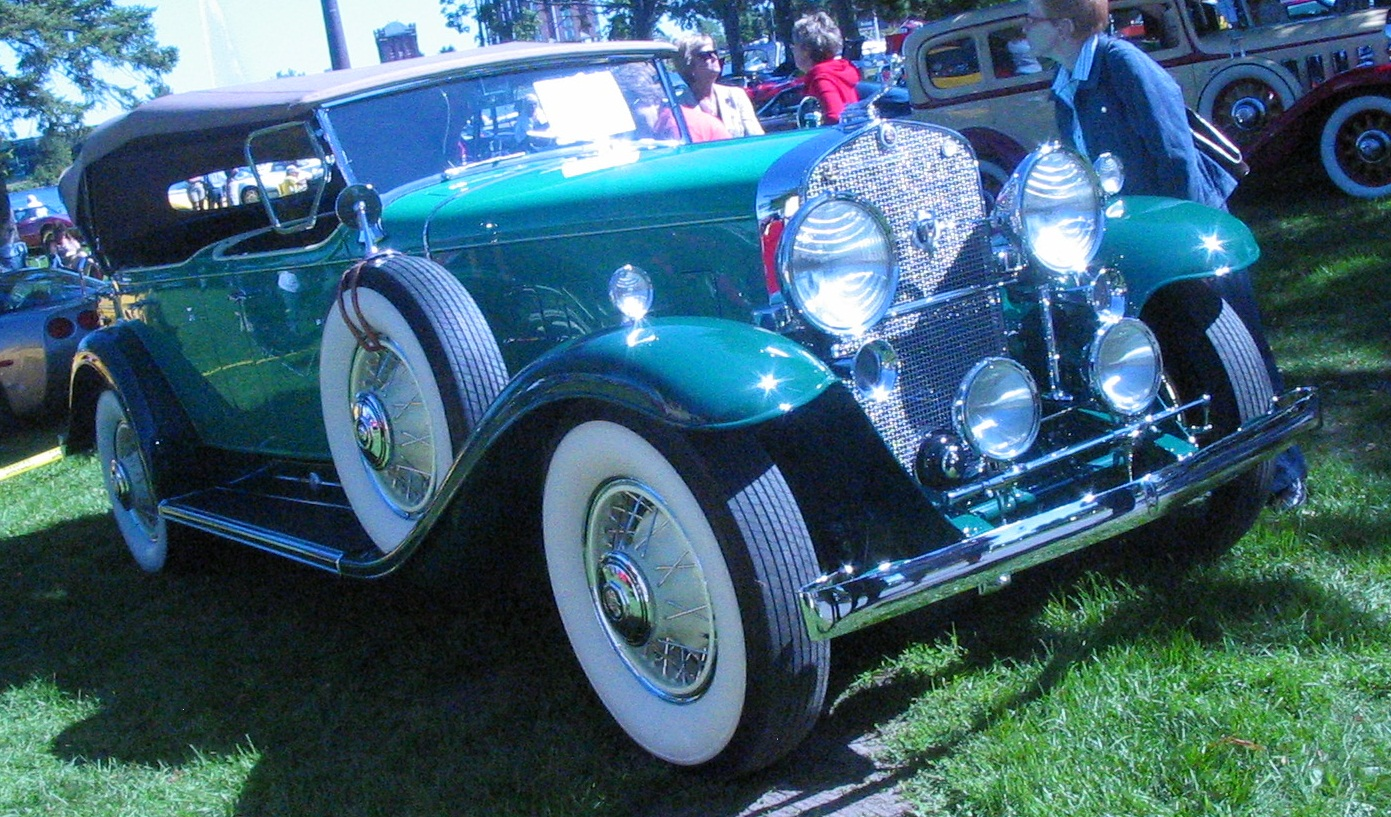
1931 Cadillac phaeton

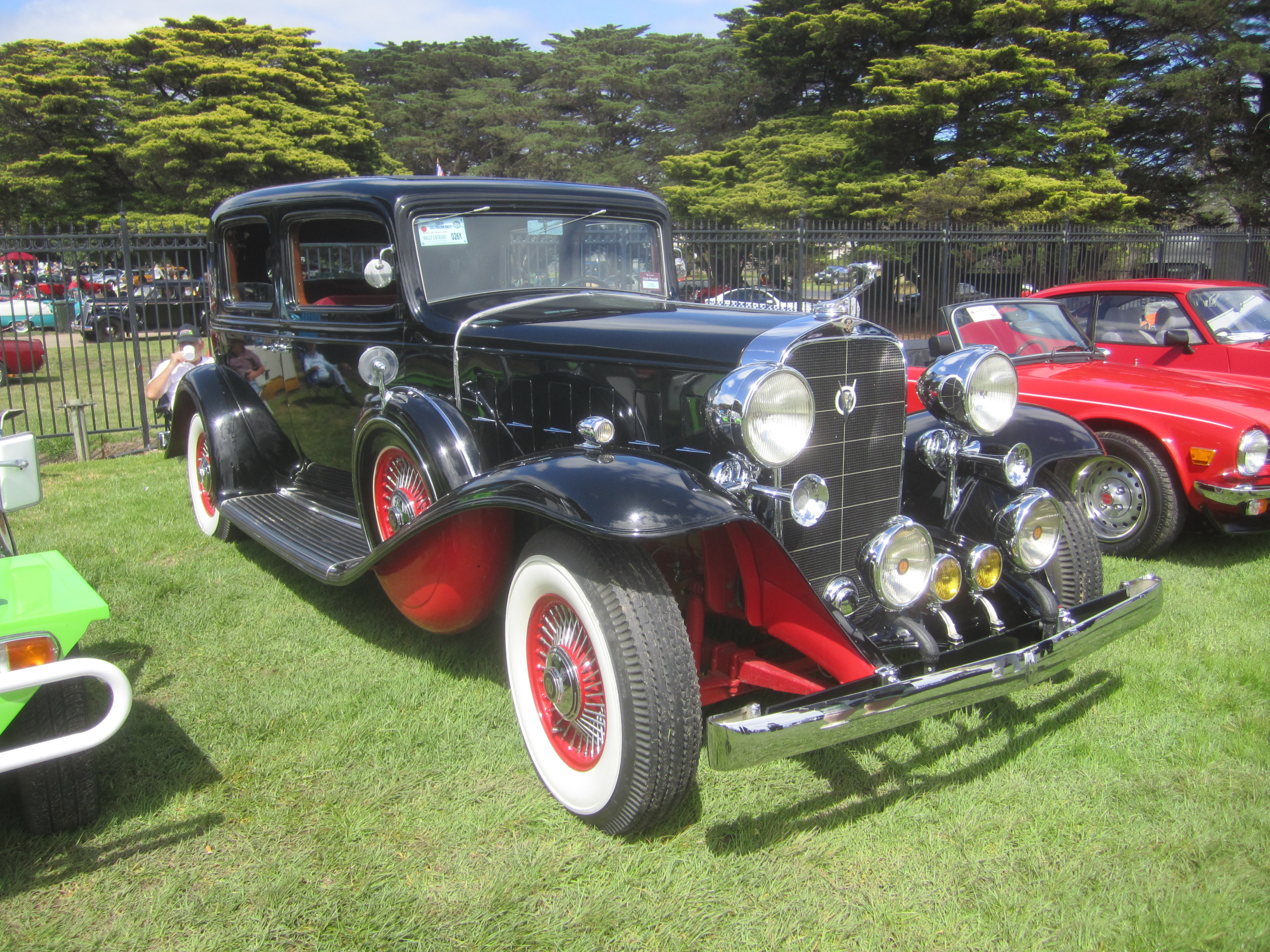
1932 Cadillac 355B V8 sedan

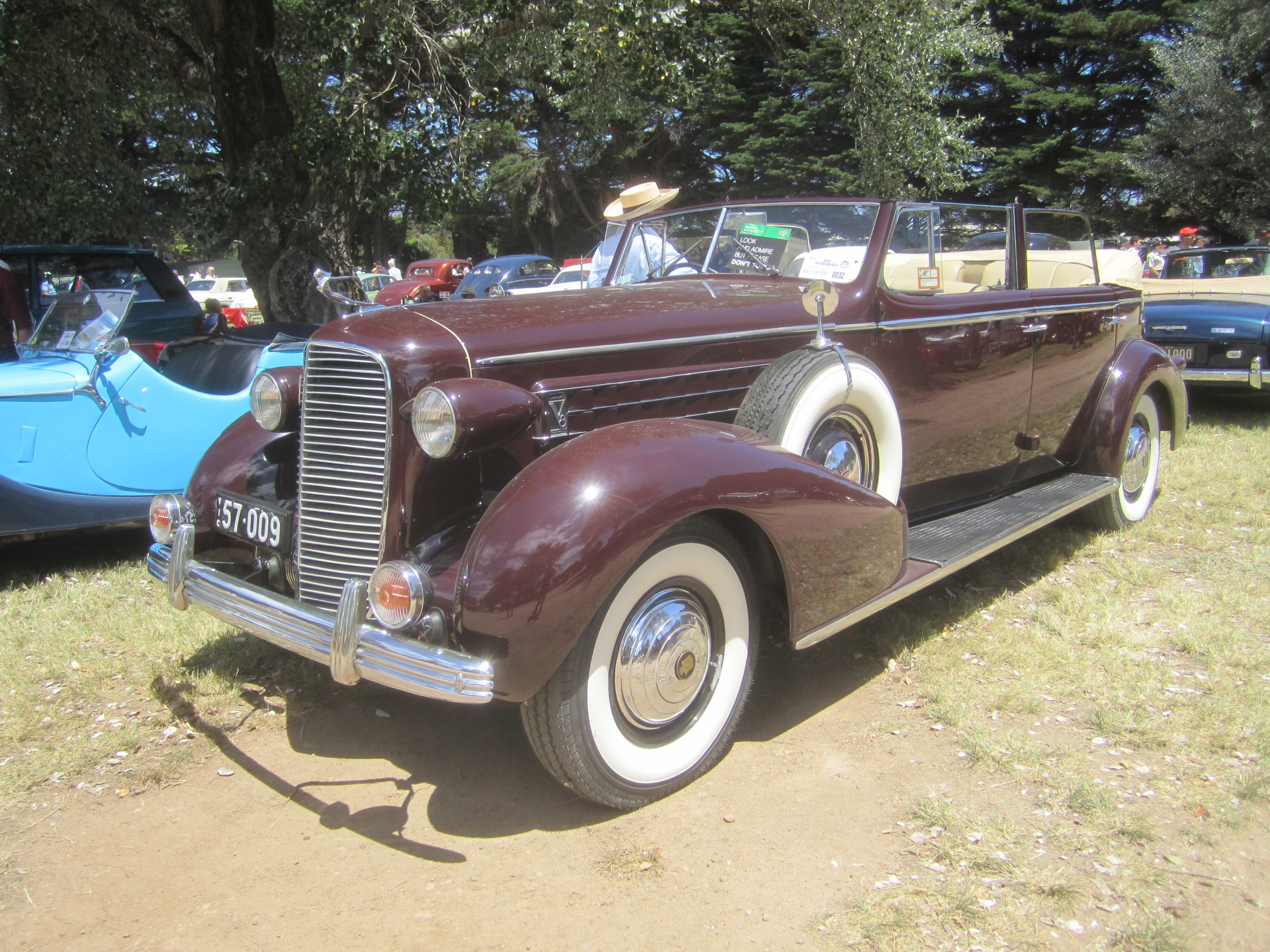
1936 Cadillac Series 70 four door convertible V8

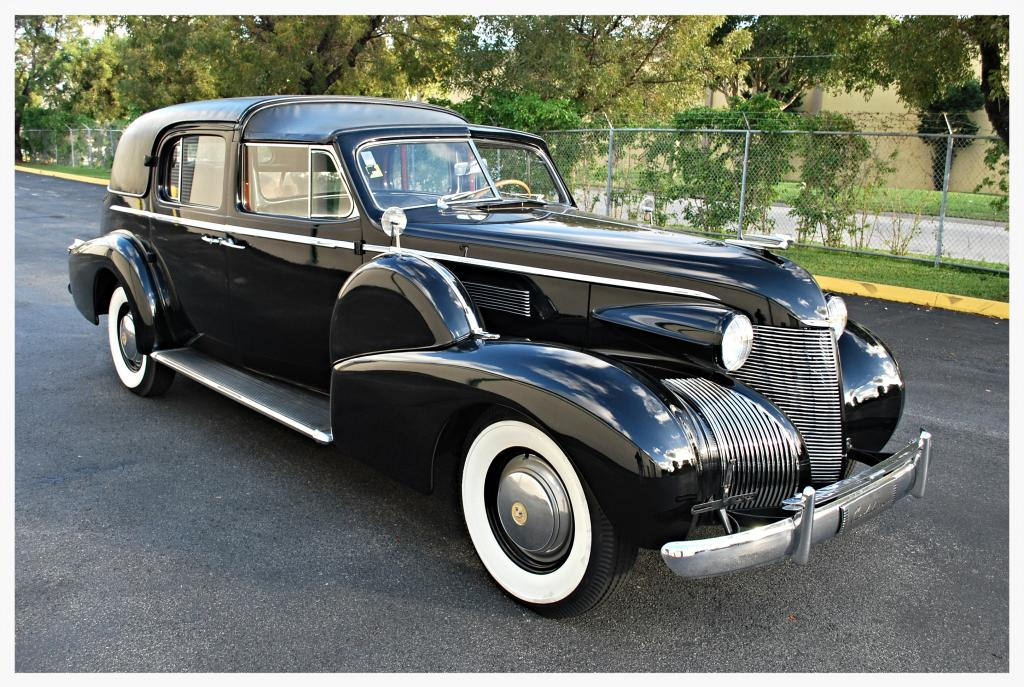
1939 Cadillac Series 75 town car

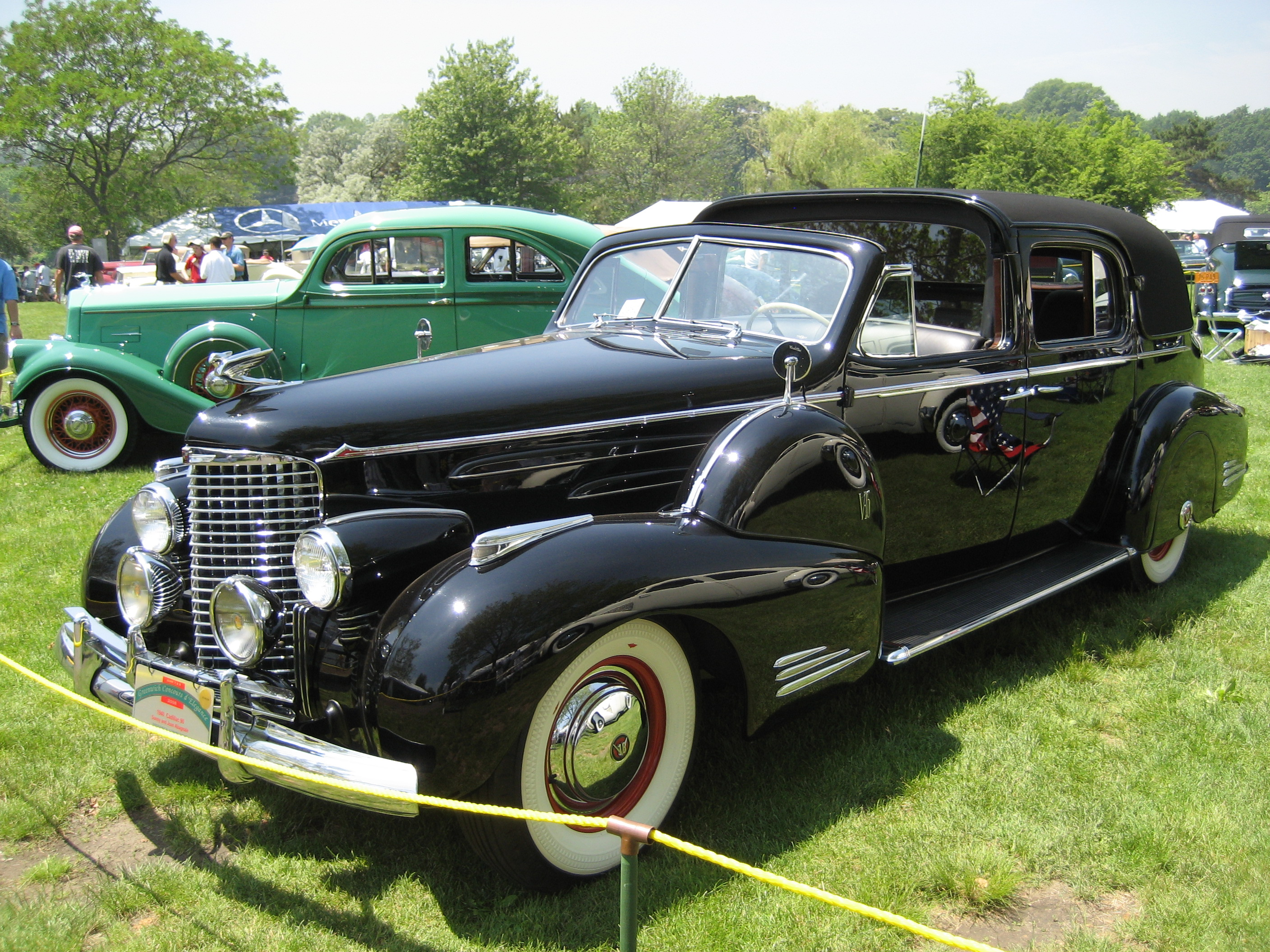
1940 Cadillac 90 town car

=== After World War II and the Great Depression: 1945–1959 ===
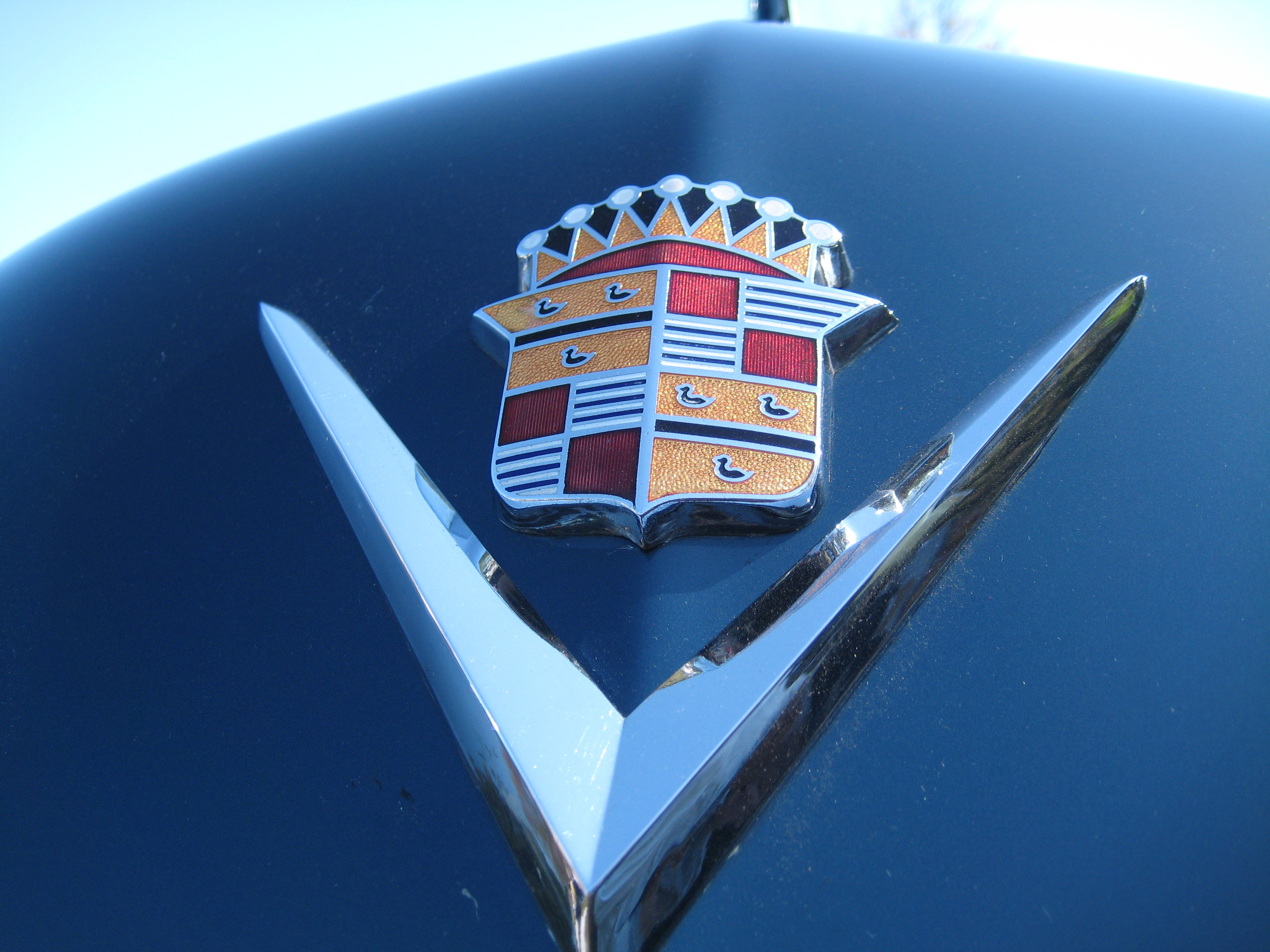

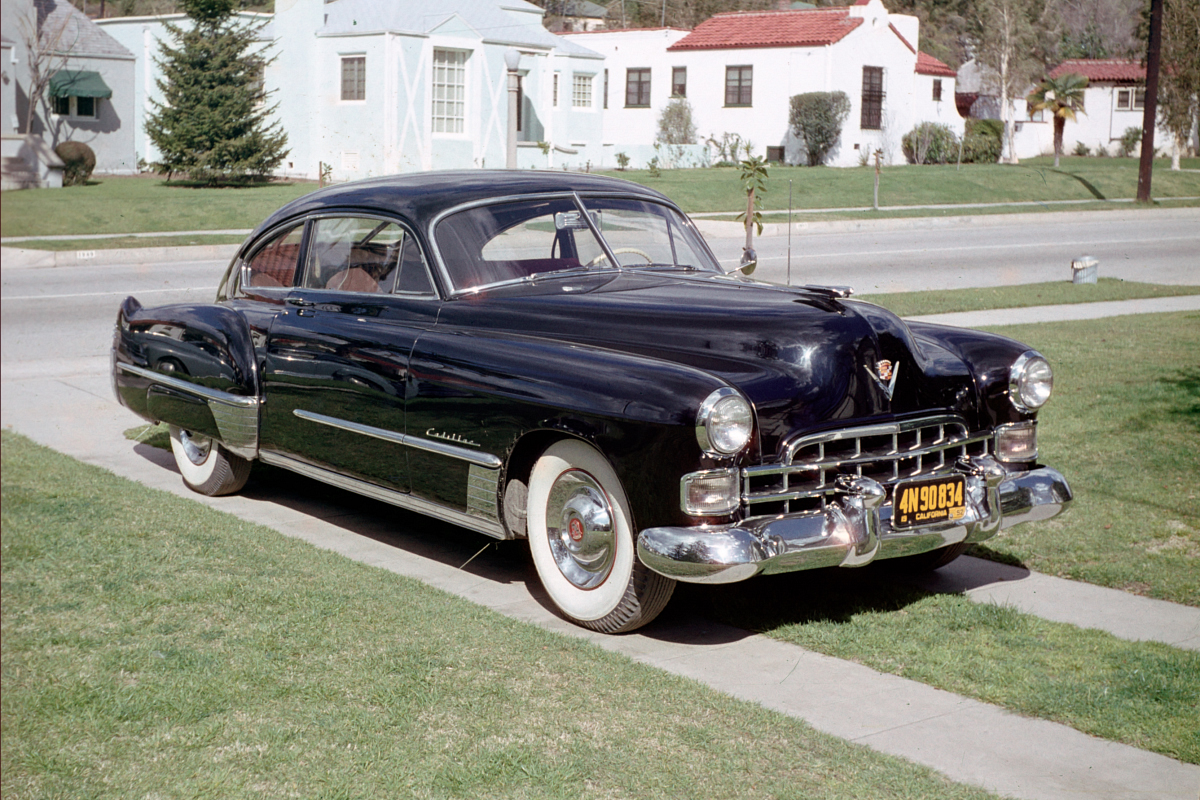
1948 Cadillac

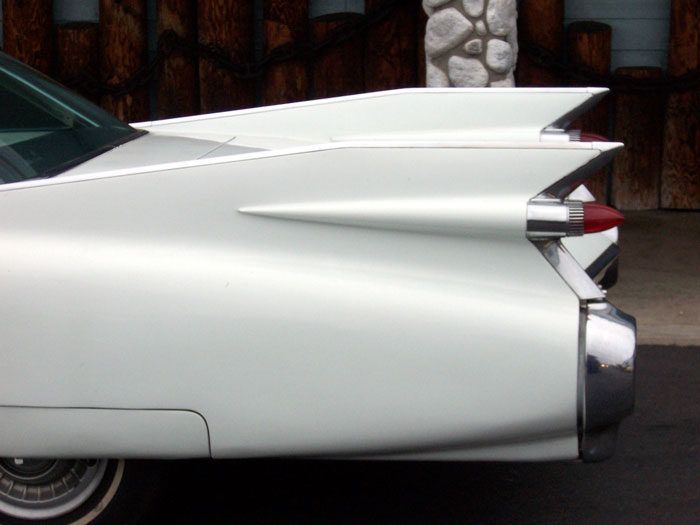
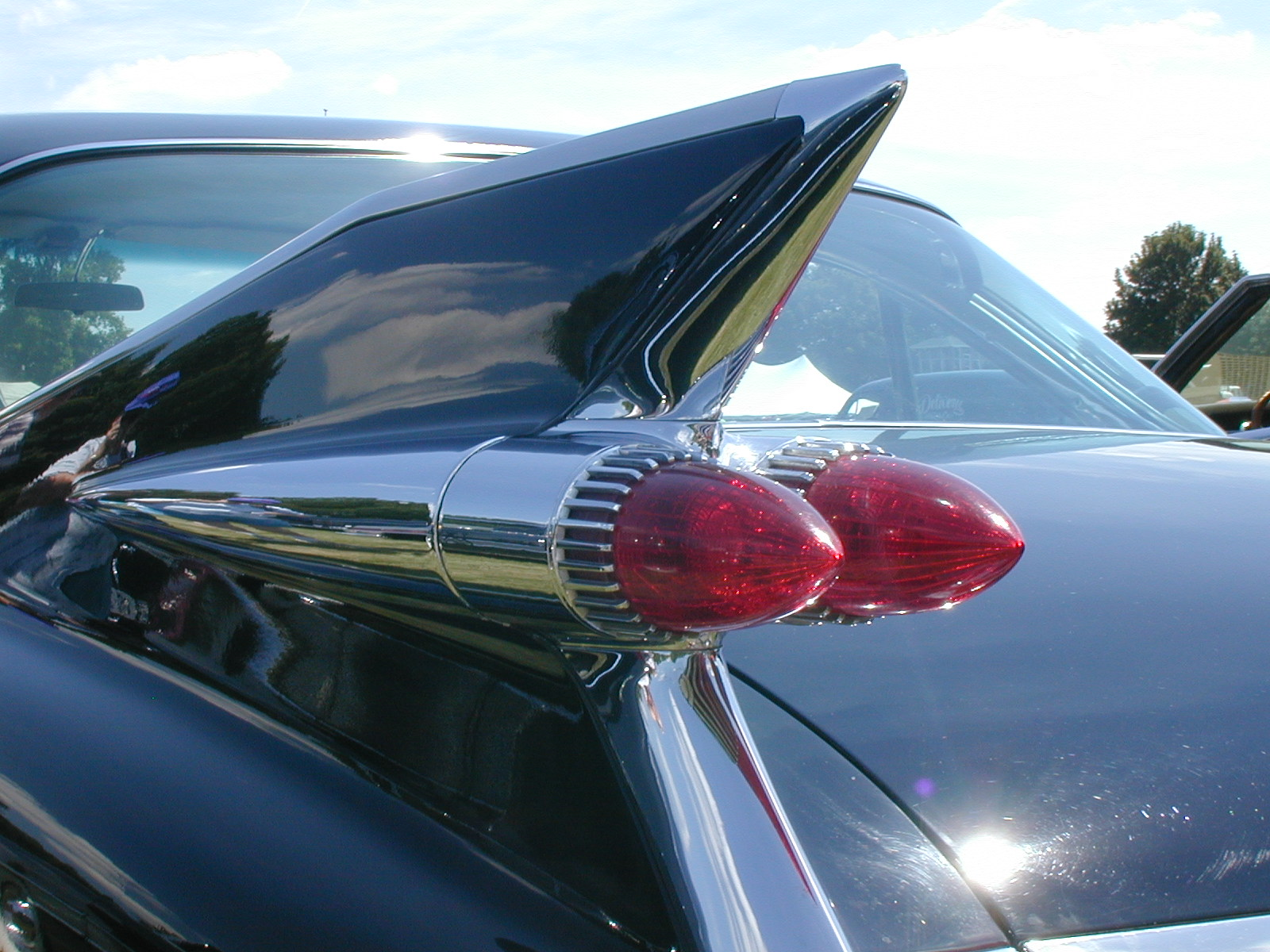
Top: Cadillac motor car logo, c. 1950s, being the coat of arms of Antoine Laumet de La Mothe, sieur de Cadillac; 1948 Cadillac. Bottom: two images of the iconic large tail fins of the 1959 Cadillac

Postwar Cadillac vehicles innovated many of the styling features that came to be synonymous with the late 1940s and 1950s American automobile. Incorporating many of the ideas of then General Motors styling chief Harley J. Earl, these included tailfins, wraparound windshields, and extensive use of chrome. Tailfins were first added in 1948 and reached their pinnacle in 1959. From 1960 to 1964 they decreased each year until they disappeared in the 1965 model year (remaining vestigially only on the limited production 1965 Series 75 chassis, a carry-over from 1964). Cadillac's other distinctive styling attribute was its front-bumper. What had started out after the war as a pair of artillery shell-shaped bumper guards moved higher on the front-end design as the 1950s wore on. Becoming known as Dagmar bumpers for their similarity to the buxom 1950s television personality, they were toned down in 1958 and gone the next year.

1956 saw the introduction of the pillarless four-door hardtop sedan, marketed as the "Sedan de Ville"; a year later the feature appeared in all standard Cadillacs. The fledgling automotive magazine Motor Trend awarded its first "Motor Trend Car of the Year" to Cadillac in 1949 for its innovative overhead valve V8 engine. While the company initially snubbed the honor, it now proudly references its "Car of the Year" wins in publicity material. On November 25, 1949, Cadillac produced its one-millionth car, a 1950 Coupe de Ville. It also set a new sales mark of 100,000 cars, matched in 1950 and 1951. 1949 also saw the introduction with Buick of the first mass-produced hardtop coupe, a closed-body style without a "B" pillar. Marketed as the Coupe de Ville, it would become one of Cadillac's most popular models for many years.

In 1951, Cadillac began production of the M41 Walker Bulldog army tank, which saw service in the Korean War and Vietnam War.

In 1953, the "Autronic Eye" was introduced. This feature would automatically dim high-beam headlamps for the safety of oncoming motorists. In 1957, Cadillac attempted to move further upmarket, creating the hand-built Series 70 Eldorado Brougham. It featured self-levelling suspension, "memory seat" function, and an all-transistor signal-seeking car radio that was produced by GM's Delco Radio and which was available as standard equipment for the 1957 Eldorado Brougham models. The car sold only 904 units.

=== Pinnacles in luxury and dimension: 1960–1976 ===
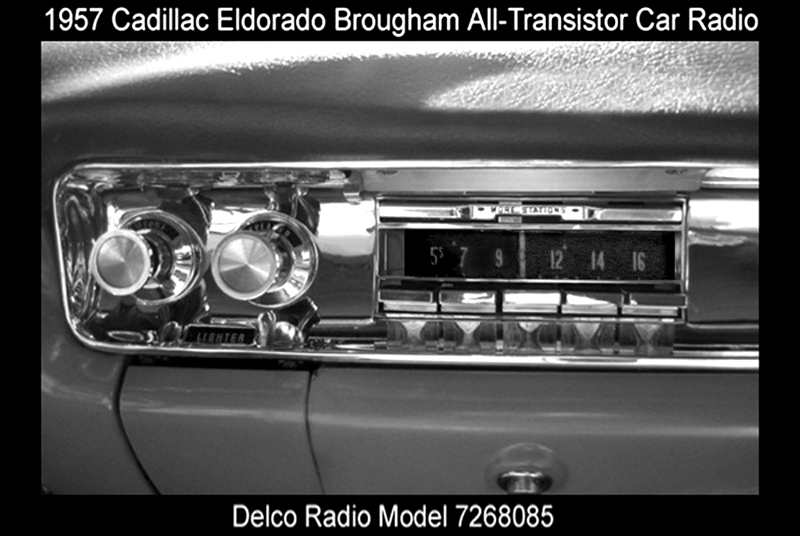
Cadillac Eldorado Brougham all-transistor car radio (1957 dashboard)

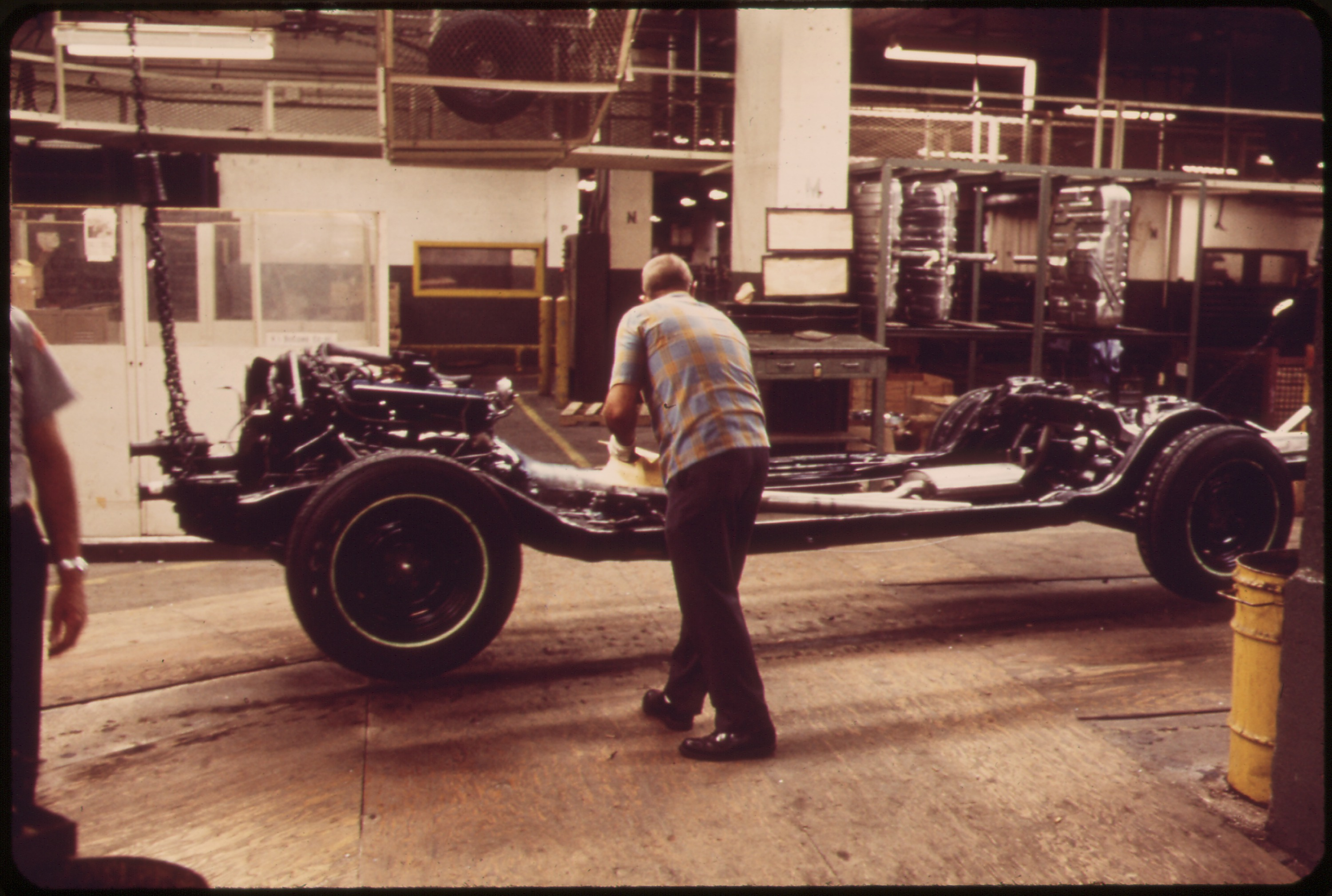
Installing a transmission on a Cadillac in Detroit, Michigan, 1973

The dual-reservoir brake master cylinder, with separate front and rear hydraulic systems, was introduced in 1962, six years ahead of the federal requirement. The first fully automatic heater–air conditioning system also appeared, as did the three-speed Turbo-Hydramatic automatic transmission; it would become the GM standard model for several decades. Starting in the late 1960s, Cadillac offered a fiber-optic warning system to alert the driver to failed light bulbs. The use of extensive bright-work on the exterior and interior also decreased each year after 1959. By the 1966 model year, even the rear bumpers ceased to be all chrome—large portions were painted, including the headlight bezels.

In 1966, Cadillac had its best annual sales to that point, over 192,000 units (142,190 of them de Villes), an increase of more than 60%. This was exceeded in 1968, when Cadillac topped 200,000 units for the first time. The years 1967 and 1968 saw the introduction of a host of federally mandated safety features, including energy-absorbing steering columns and wheels, soft interior and instrument panel knobs and surfaces, front shoulder belts, and side marker lights.

The front-wheel drive Eldorado was launched in 1967, setting a new standard for a personal luxury car. Its simple, elegant design was a far cry from the tailfin and chrome of the 1950s. Cadillac's success grew against rivals Lincoln and Imperial, which had division sales topping all of Chrysler for the first time in 1970. The new 472 cu in (7.7 L) engine that debuted in the 1968 model year, designed for an ultimate capacity potential of 600 cu in (9.8 L), was increased to 500 cu in (8.2 L) for the 1970 Eldorado. It was adopted across the model range beginning in 1975. Driver and front passenger airbags ("Air Cushion Restraint System") began to be offered on some Cadillac, as well as other Buick and Oldsmobile luxury models, in 1974, however this option was unpopular and was discontinued after the 1976 model year. The pillarless Coupe deVille ended with the 1973 model, while the Sedan deVille remained pillarless through 1976.

The 1970s saw new extremes in vehicle luxury and dimension. The 1972 Fleetwood was some 1.7 in (43 mm) longer in wheelbase and 4 in (100 mm) overall, compared to the 1960 Series 75 Fleetwood; the entry-level 1972 Calais was 2.4 in (61.0 mm) longer than the equivalent 1960 Series 62, on the same wheelbase. Models gained a smoother ride while vehicle weight, standard equipment and engine displacement were all increased. Cadillac experienced record sales in 1973 and again in the late 1970s. In May 1975, the Seville was introduced as a competitor to the growing import luxury car market and was marketed as "international size".

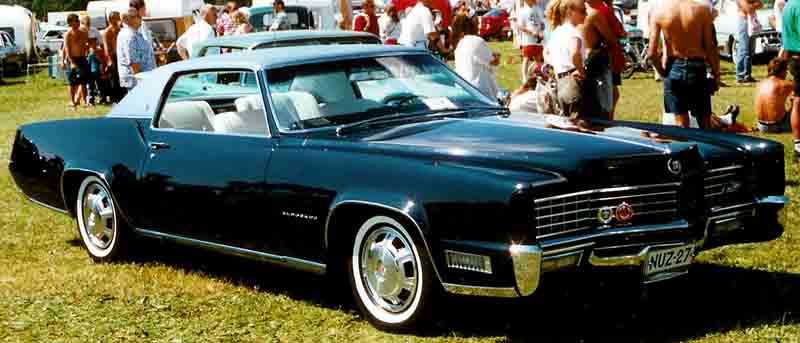
1967–70 Cadillac Eldorado

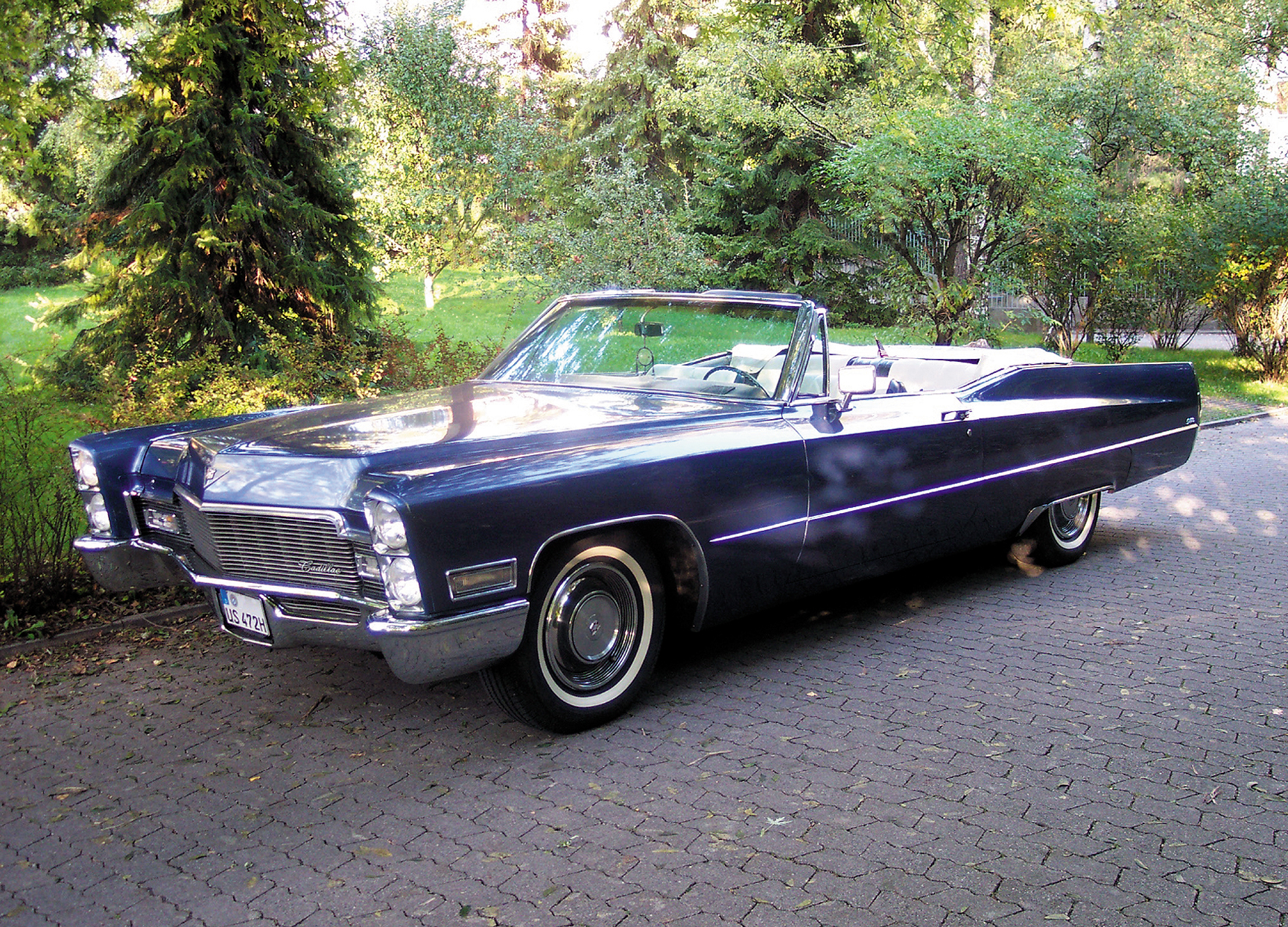
1968 Cadillac DeVille

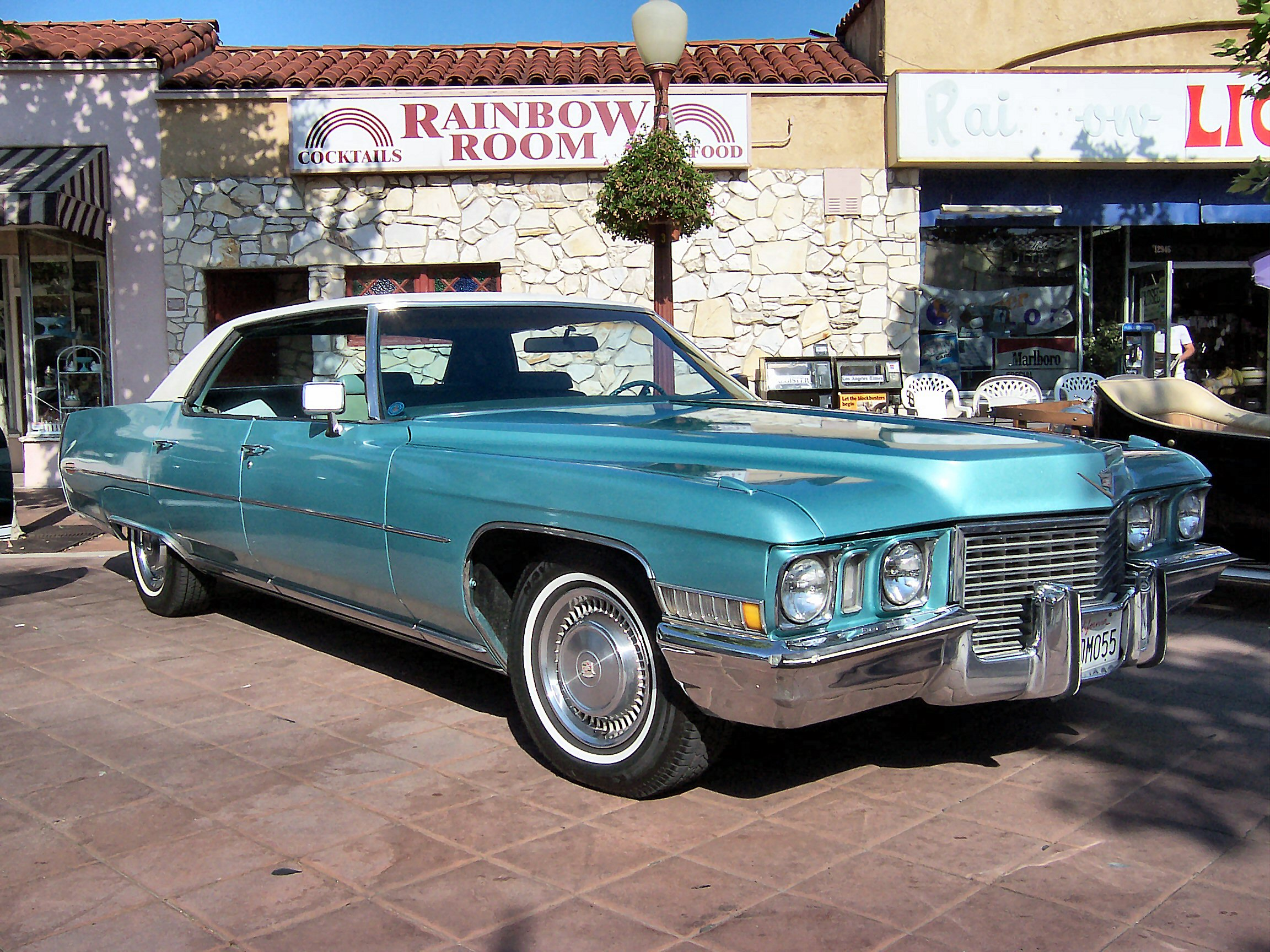
1972 Cadillac DeVille

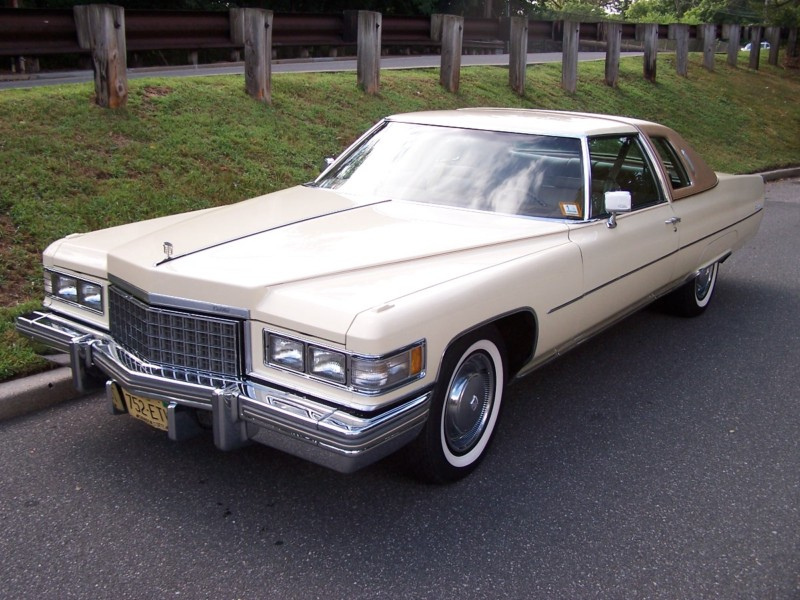
1976 Cadillac DeVille

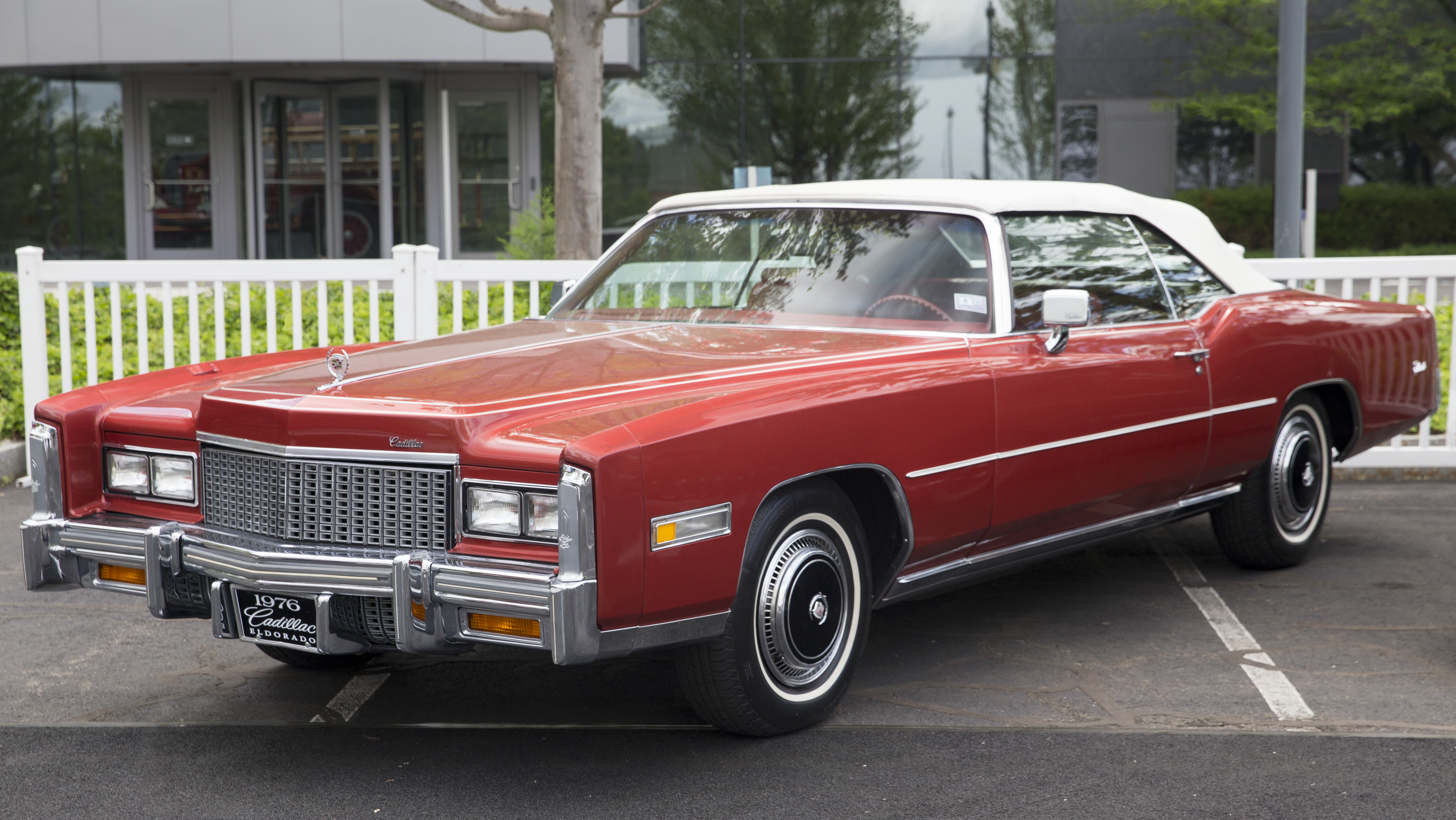
1976 Cadillac Eldorado Convertible

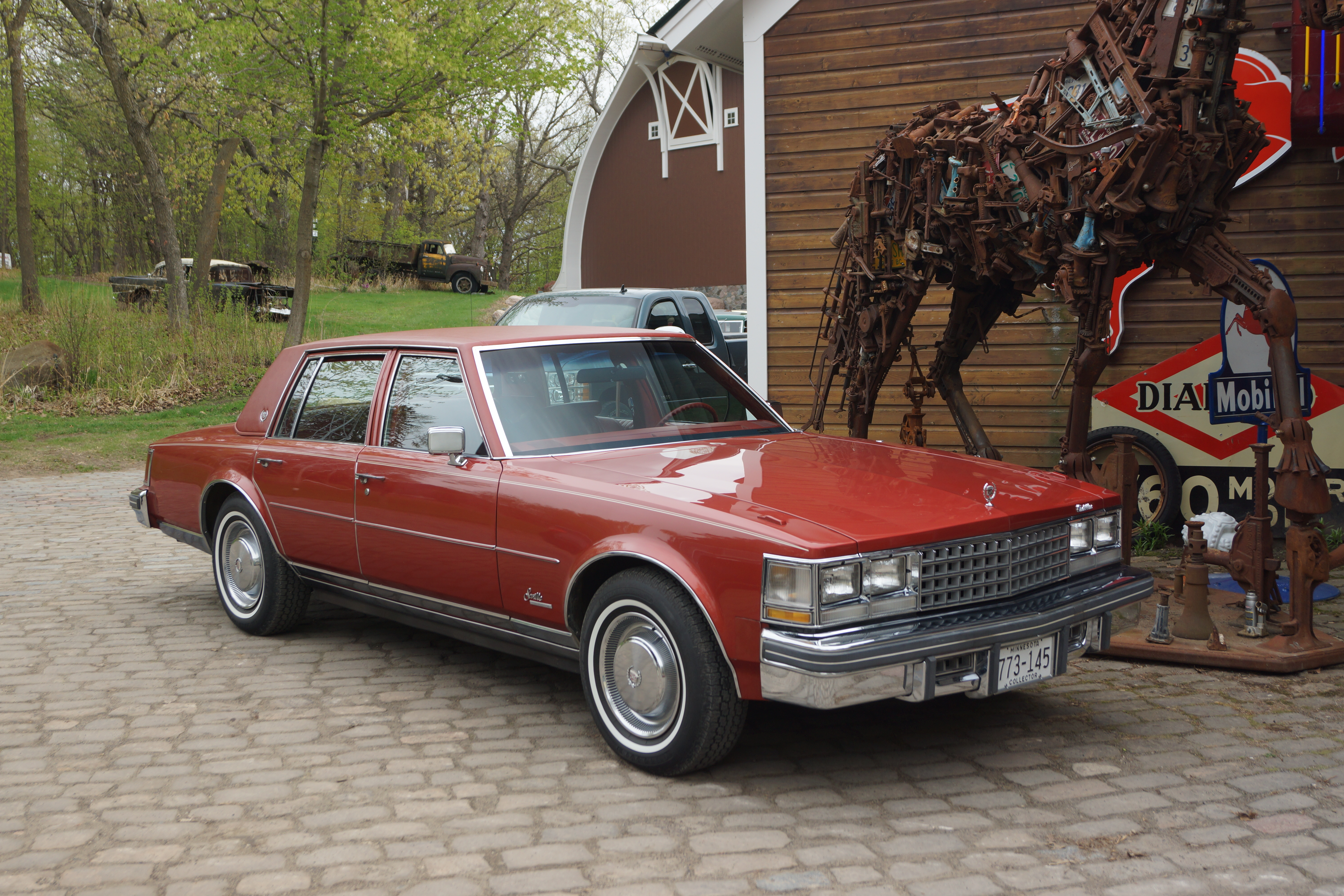
1976 Cadillac Seville

=== Downsizings and new technology-assisted luxury features: 1977–1988 ===
In 1977, Cadillac's D-bodies experienced the same "downsizing" as the rest of GM's "B" and "C" bodied cars. In 1977, GM significantly downsized their full-sized cars. The Fleetwood Brougham lost its exclusive longer wheelbase and now rode on the same new shorter 121.5" wheelbase as the de Ville. Both Fleetwood and de Ville models were powered by the 425 cu in (7.0 L) V8s. This engine was basically a de-bored version of the 472/500 (7.9 L/8.2 L) V8 of previous years.

1977 was Cadillac's 75th anniversary and saw the introduction of the downsized de Ville coupes and sedans. The redesigned Fleetwood Brougham was now similar in appearance to the lesser Sedan de Ville. Other than the name, there were only subtle exterior differences between a Fleetwood Brougham and Sedan de Ville. The interior of the Fleetwood was plusher and offered more features as standard. These new cars featured a higher roofline, resulting in a vehicle that was more than nine inches shorter, four inches narrower, and half a ton lighter than the previous year, but with a larger trunk and more headroom and legroom. These were also the first de Villes to be marketed without fender skirts over the rear wheels. The 500 in^{3} V8 (which produced 190 horsepower) was replaced for 1977 by a 180-horsepower 425 in^{3} V8 variant of similar design. The reduction in size and weight was implemented to improve fuel economy and emissions as a result of the United States Federal Government passage of Corporate Average Fuel Economy regulations.

For 1977, the lineup included the two-door Coupe de Ville ($9,654) and the four-door Sedan de Ville ($9,864). The $650 d'Elegance package, an interior dress-up option carried over from the previous generation of de Villes, continued for both models. Three-sided, wrap-around tail lamps were a 1977 feature only (although they would re-appear in 1987). Coupe de Ville's popular "Cabriolet" option, priced at $348, included a rear-half padded vinyl roof covering and opera lamps. An optional electronic fuel-injected version of the standard 7.0-liter powerplant, adding 15 horsepower (11 kW), was available for an additional $647. Sales figures were 138,750 Coupe de Villes and 95,421 Sedan de Villes for an all-time sales record of 234,171 de Villes sold.

With these downsizings, fuel economy and handling improved. In 1979, Cadillac's flagship Eldorado coupe would downsize. The 1980s saw further downsizing of many models including the de Ville, Fleetwood, Eldorado and Seville. Cadillac brought out a dramatic redesign for the Seville in 1980 featuring a bustle-back rear-end styling theme and a move to the same front-wheel-drive chassis as the Eldorado. In 1982, the Cimarron was introduced as the brand's first compact car. The Cimarron's market failure is one in a series of events throughout the 1980s and 1990s which sullied Cadillac's reputation and caused the division's share of the US market to fall from 3.8% in 1979 to 2.2% in 1997; it is routinely cited as the nadir of GM's product planning. Automotive journalist Dan Neil included the Cimarron in his 2007 list of the "Worst cars of all time", saying "everything that was wrong, venal, lazy, and mendacious about GM in the 1980s was crystallized in this flagrant insult to the good name and fine customers of Cadillac." He added that the Cimarron "nearly killed Cadillac and remains its biggest shame".

For the 1981 model year, the long-running "Standard of the World" slogan was changed to "An American Standard of the World". For the 1982 model year, the slogan was changed to "Best of All ... It's A Cadillac", which was used until 1986.

Due to a delay in the production of the new front-drive de Villes (which were now scheduled for release as 1985 models), 1984 was a re-run for the rear-wheel-drive Coupe de Ville ($17,140) and its four-door companion, the popular Sedan de Ville ($17,625). It was also the last time de Ville used the "V" emblem below the Cadillac crest, as 1985 models and on would use the crest and wreath emblem—formerly a Fleetwood and Eldorado exclusive. For 1984, sales figures show a total four-door production of 107,920 units, and an additional 50,840 two-door units (figures include de Ville and Fleetwood models). The new front-drive 1985 Coupe de Ville and Sedan de Ville arrived in Cadillac showrooms during the spring of 1984, about six months earlier than most new-car introductions, so both the 1984 rear-drive and 1985 front-drive models were selling and being produced (due to separate assembly plants) at the same time for nearly half a year.

1985 saw the new front-wheel-drive de Ville and Fleetwood models released after quality delays prevented a planned 1984 model year introduction. 1986 saw new downsized Eldorado and Seville models. In 1987, the all-new Pininfarina-bodied Allanté roadster came to market featuring the HT-4100 V8 engine. The Sixty Special returned in 1987 as the top owner-driven Cadillac in the front-wheel-drive GM C-body lineup, with a planned production run of 2,000 cars. The 1987 and 1988 Sixty Specials featured a five-inch (127 mm) longer wheelbase over the de Ville/Fleetwood on which they were based. Also in 1987, Detroit Assembly on Clark Street in Detroit, where Cadillacs had been made since 1921, was closed.

The 1980s also saw the introduction of new, technology-assisted luxury features. Among these was the return of the memory seat option, not available since the 1958 Eldorado Brougham. 1981 brought standard digital heating and air conditioning controls to all models. In 1982, the High Technology engine was introduced. It was originally scheduled for a 1983 release, later delayed to 1985, with its intended applications being the downsized front-wheel-drive models Cadillac would introduce that year. 1983 saw the introduction of the Delco/Bose stereo system option, a US$895 cassette stereo system available only on the Eldorado and Seville. This Bose system would eventually become available on the de Ville and Fleetwood models on their 1985 FWD editions. The trip computer, available for Eldorado in 1979 and Seville in 1978 and 1979, was replaced in 1981 with the availability of digital instrumentation with some Trip Computer functions being replaced by the new digital heating and air conditioning control panel. Digital instrumentation would become available for the new FWD de Ville and Fleetwood series in 1985.

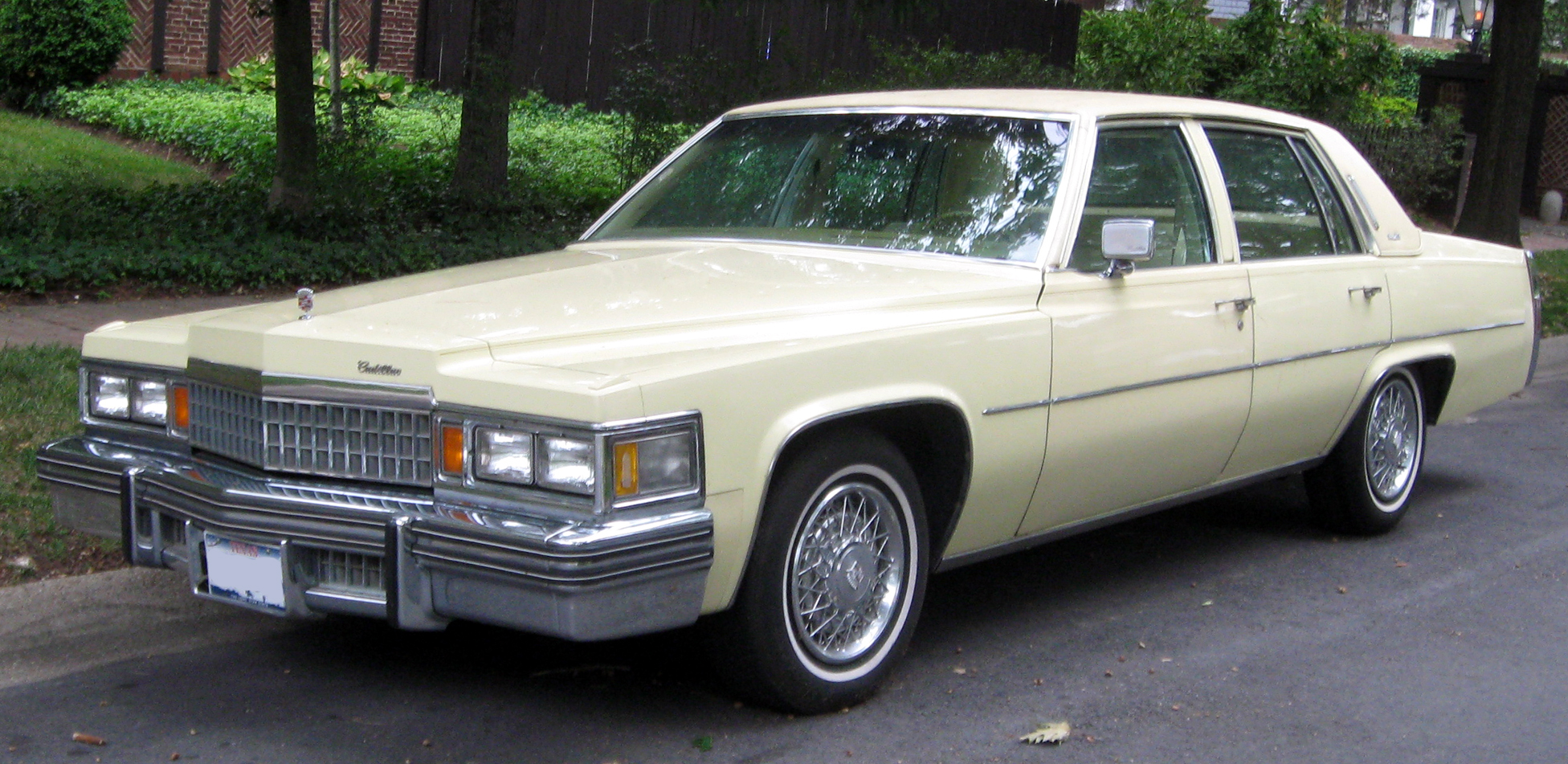
1978 Cadillac de Ville

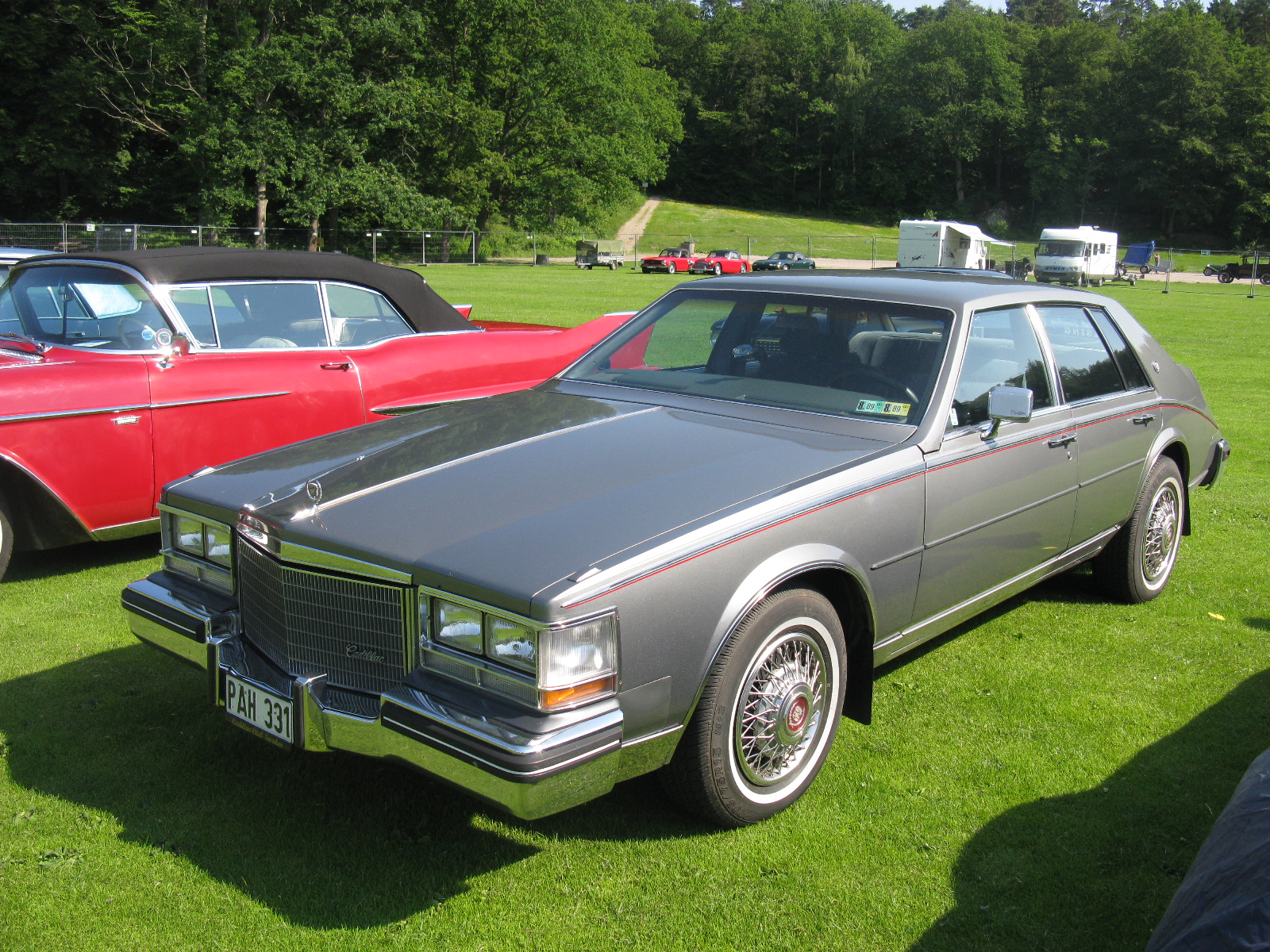
1980 Cadillac Seville

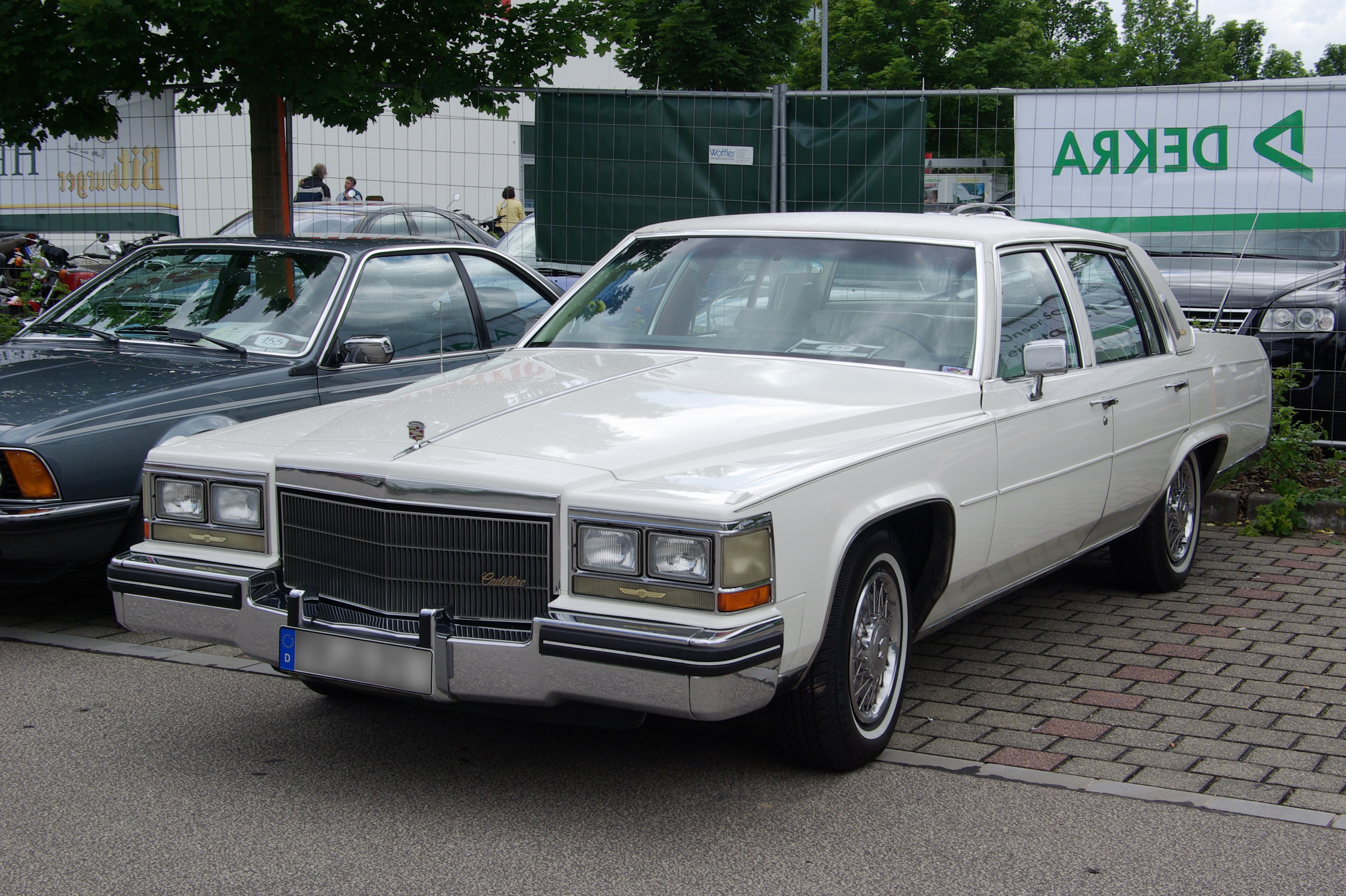
1984 Cadillac de Ville

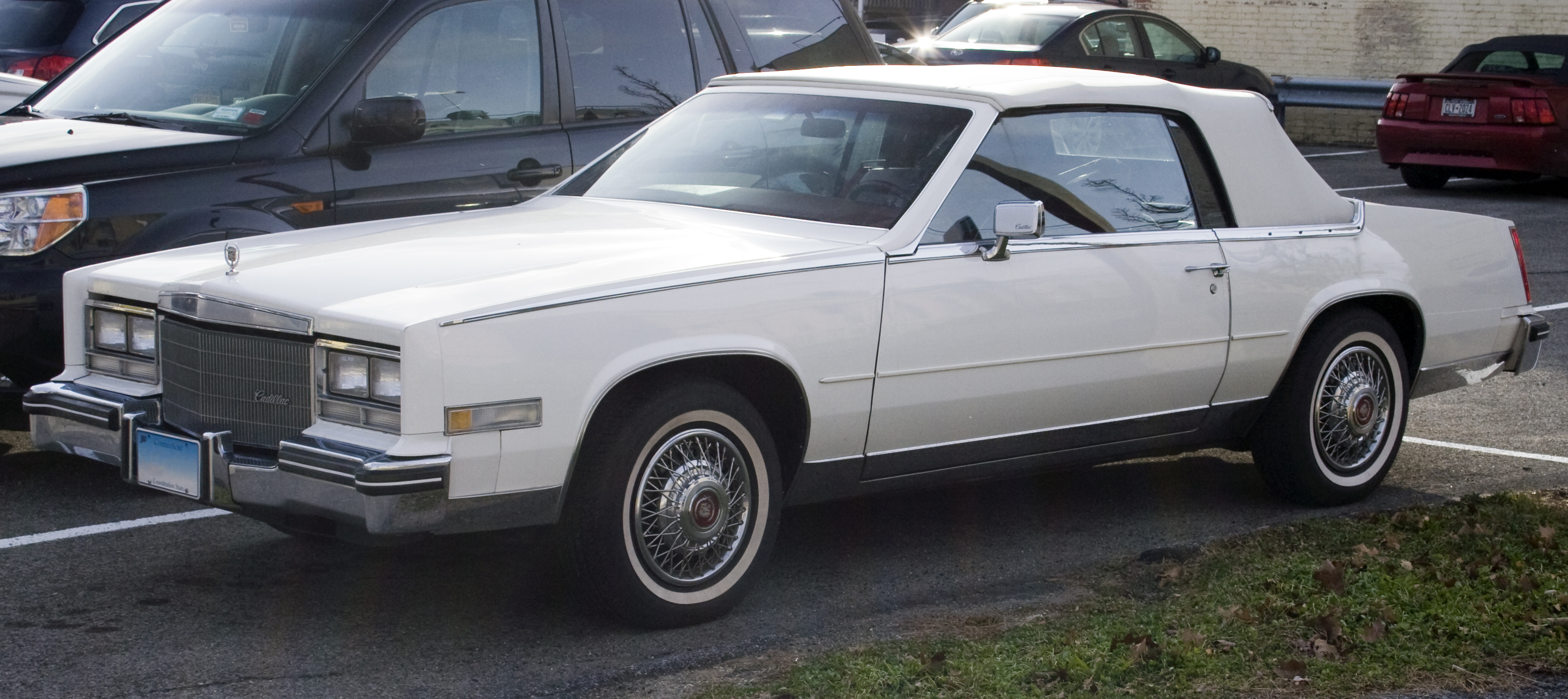
1984 Cadillac Eldorado

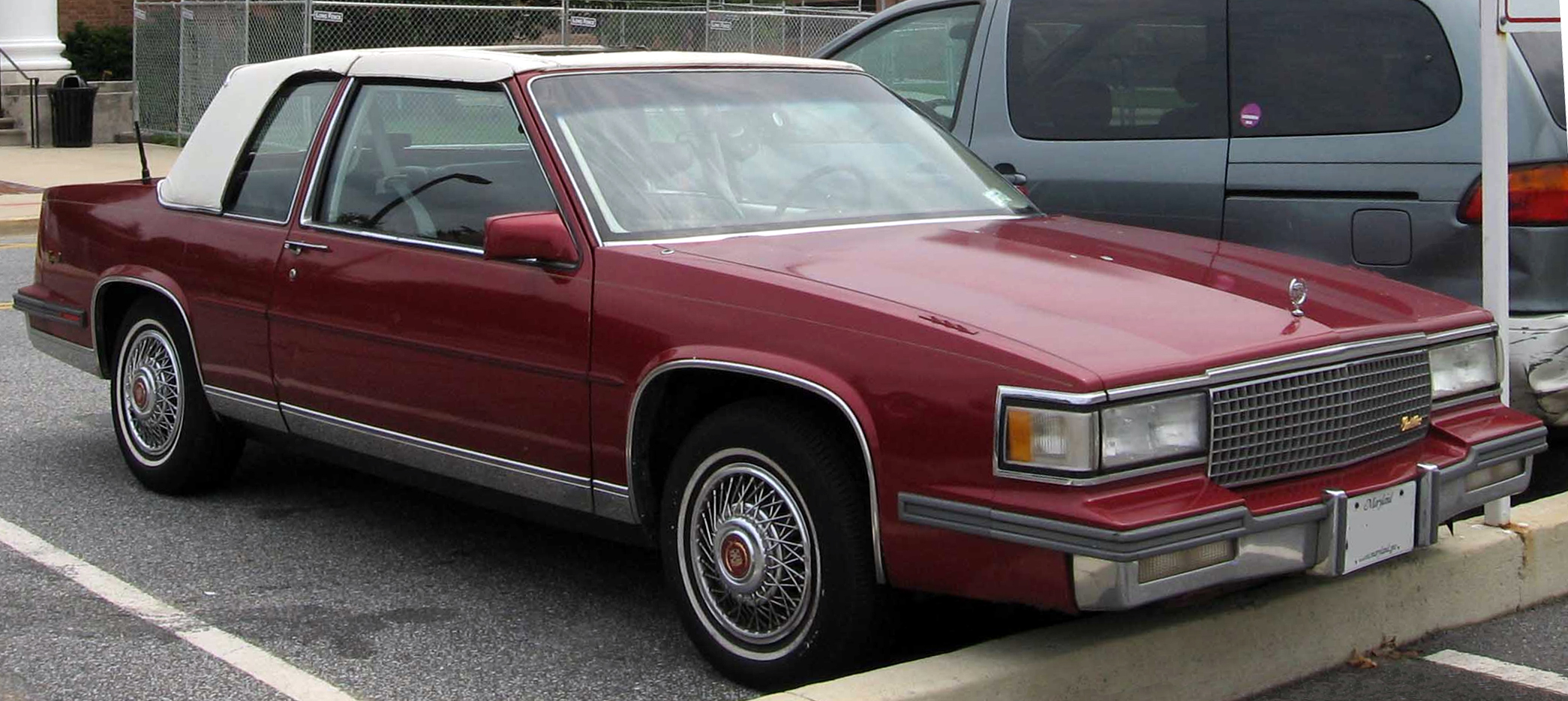
1987 Cadillac de Ville

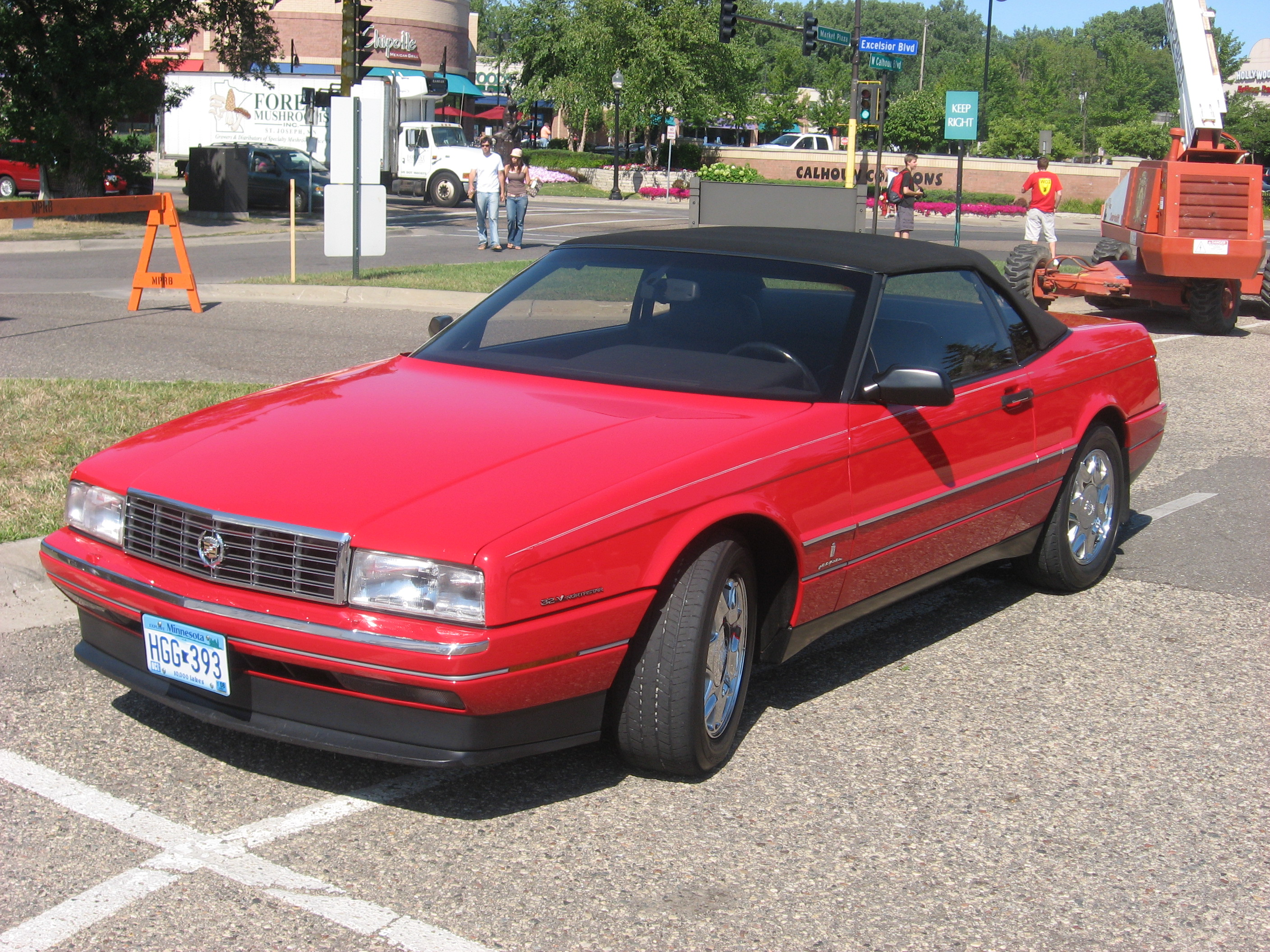
1988 Cadillac Allanté

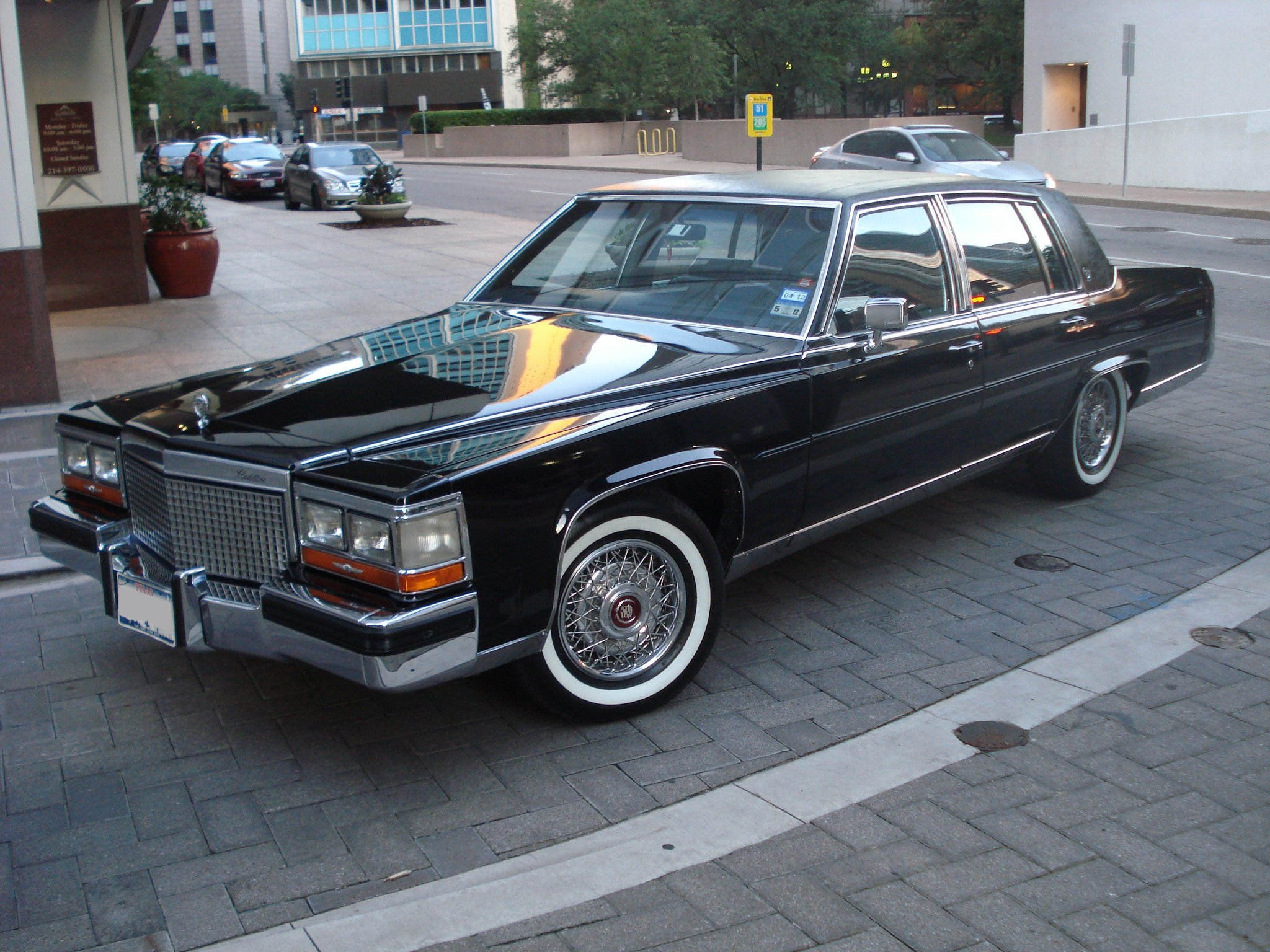
1988 Cadillac Brougham

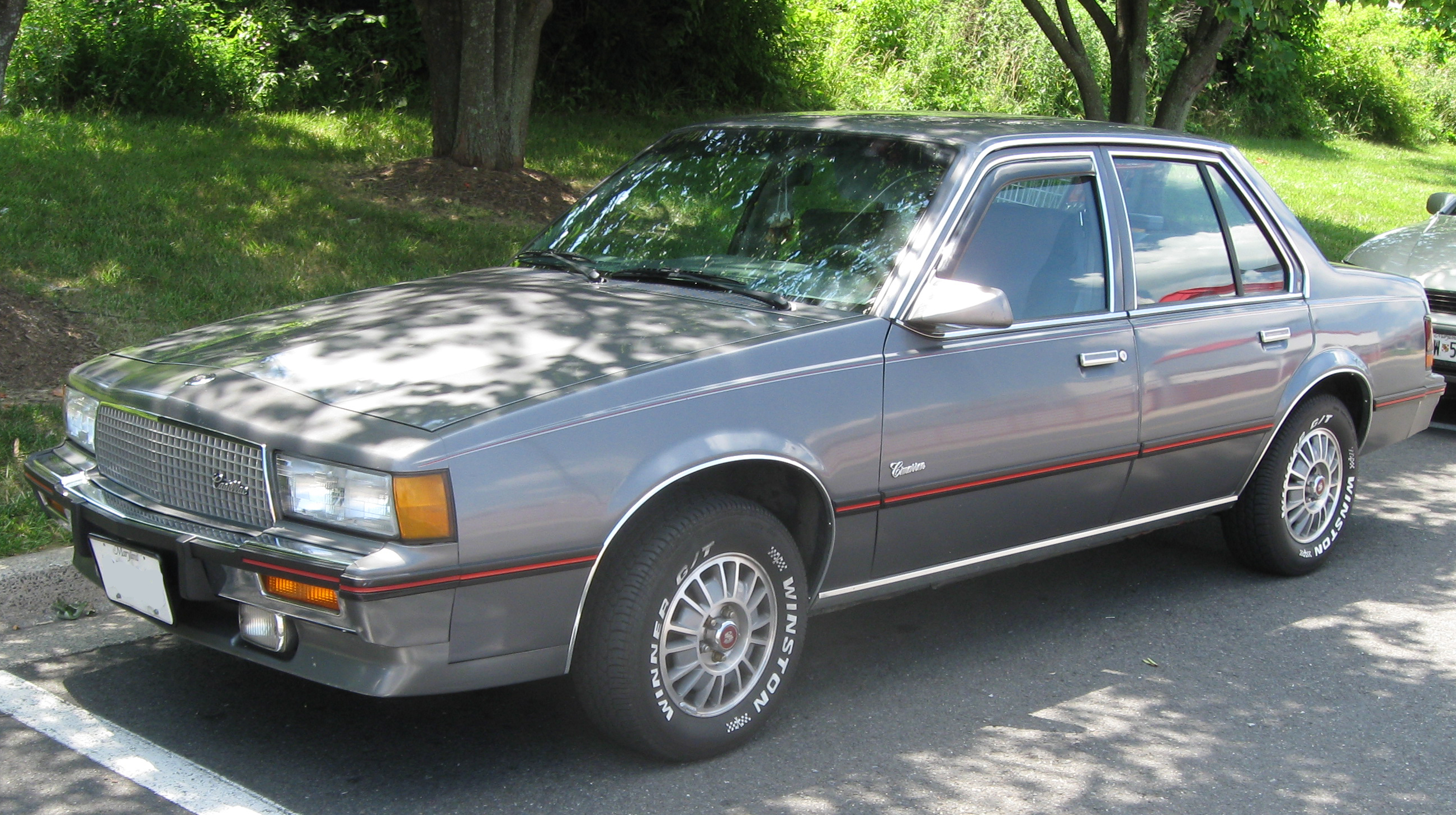
1988 Cadillac Cimarron

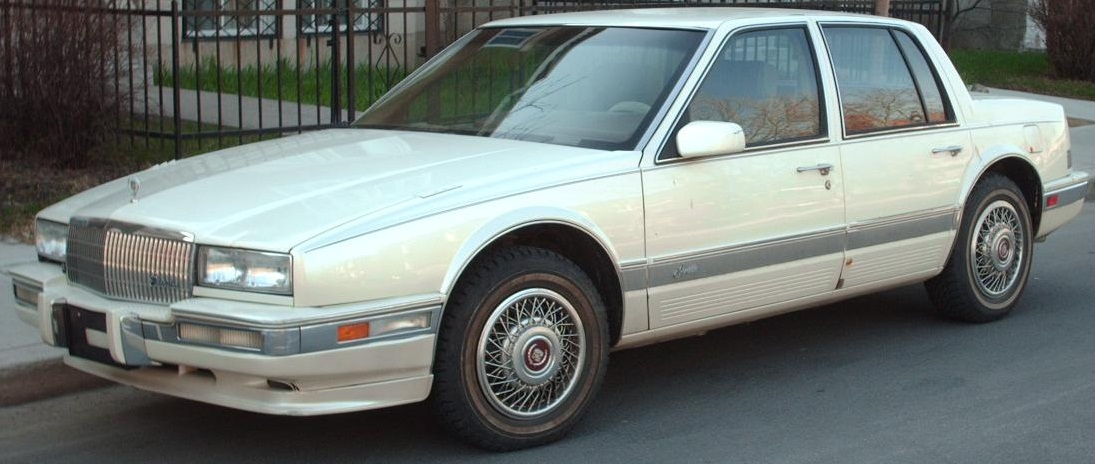
1988 Cadillac Seville

=== New introductions: 1989–1999 ===
In 1991, Cadillac introduced the Northstar engine, which was a family of high-performance 90° V engines produced by General Motors from 1991 to 2010. Regarded as GM's most technically complex engine, the original double overhead cam, four valve per cylinder, aluminum block/aluminum head V8 design was developed by Oldsmobile's R&D, but is most associated with Cadillac's Northstar series. The related Northstar System was Cadillac's trademarked name for a package of performance features introduced in mid-1992 that coupled variable valve timing, road sensing suspension, variable power steering and four-wheel disc brakes to the Division's high-output and high-torque Northstar engines.

For 1992, the Seville was redesigned to better compete with luxury performance sedans from Europe and had adopted some styling cues from the 1988 Cadillac Voyage concept car. It also made Car and Driver magazine's Ten Best list that year. A year later, the Brougham was discontinued and replaced by the all-new rear-wheel-drive 1993 Fleetwood. The previous front-wheel drive Fleetwood was renamed Sixty Special for 1993. That same year, the Coupe de Ville was discontinued due to the declining popularity of full-size coupes.

For 1994, the de Ville was redesigned to share the K-body platform with the Seville. The body was redesigned, although the wheelbase remained 113.8 inches—rather than the 111 inches used on the Seville. Production moved to Hamtramck, Michigan. Also for 1994, all de Ville models included a standard SRS driver-side front airbag, as well as fully digital instrumentation with an integrated message center, which provided important vehicle information and status, current speed, outside temperature and more, with controls mounted to the left of the instrument cluster. Also standard was a dual-zone front HVAC system, with controls located to the right of the instrument cluster, and remote controls on the front passenger door panel. An SRS passenger's-side front airbag became standard equipment after a restyling in 1996, which also brought revised exterior styling and new audio systems with TheftLock coded anti-theft technology. In 1995, the high technology engine that had been used in Cadillacs since 1982 was discontinued.

For 1997, the Catera mid-size sedan was introduced as Cadillac's new entry-level model. The Catera was a rebadged variant of the Opel Omega B and was manufactured by Opel in Rüsselsheim, Germany. The de Ville was also redesigned that year. The late 1990s saw Cadillac field its first-ever entry in the growing SUV segment. The Escalade, introduced in 1999, was marketed to compete with the Lincoln Navigator and luxury SUVs from various import brands.

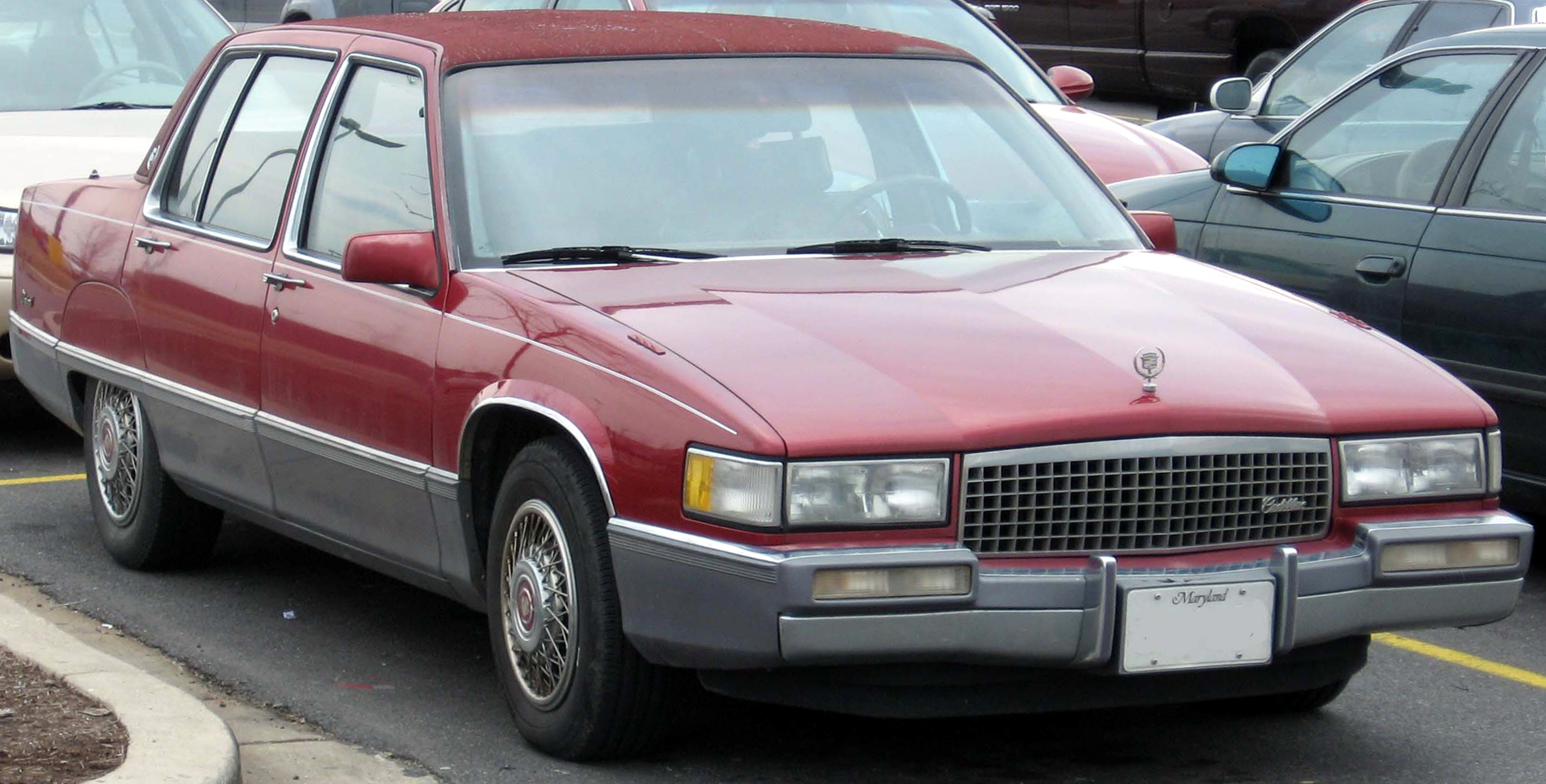
1989 Cadillac Fleetwood

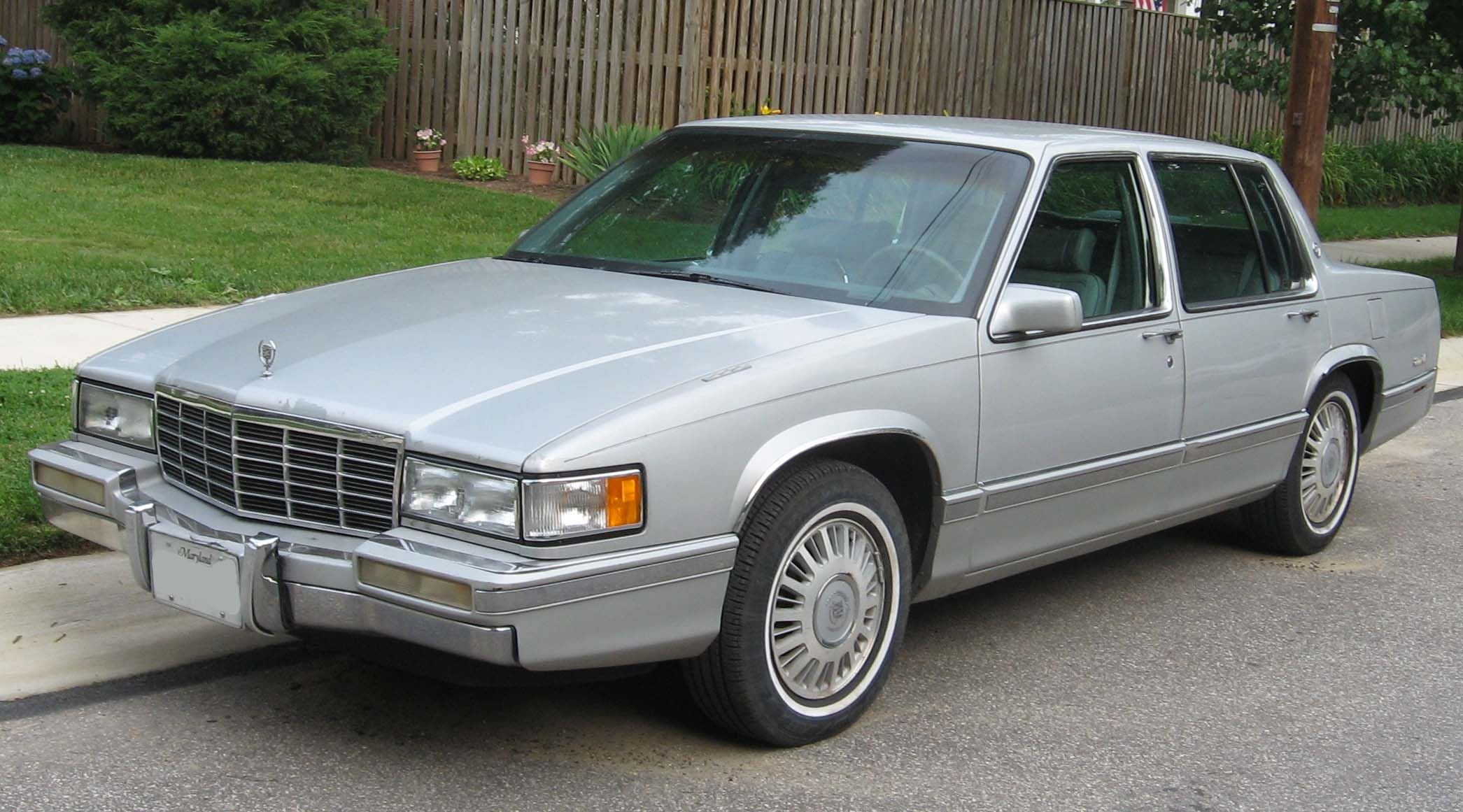
1991 Cadillac de Ville

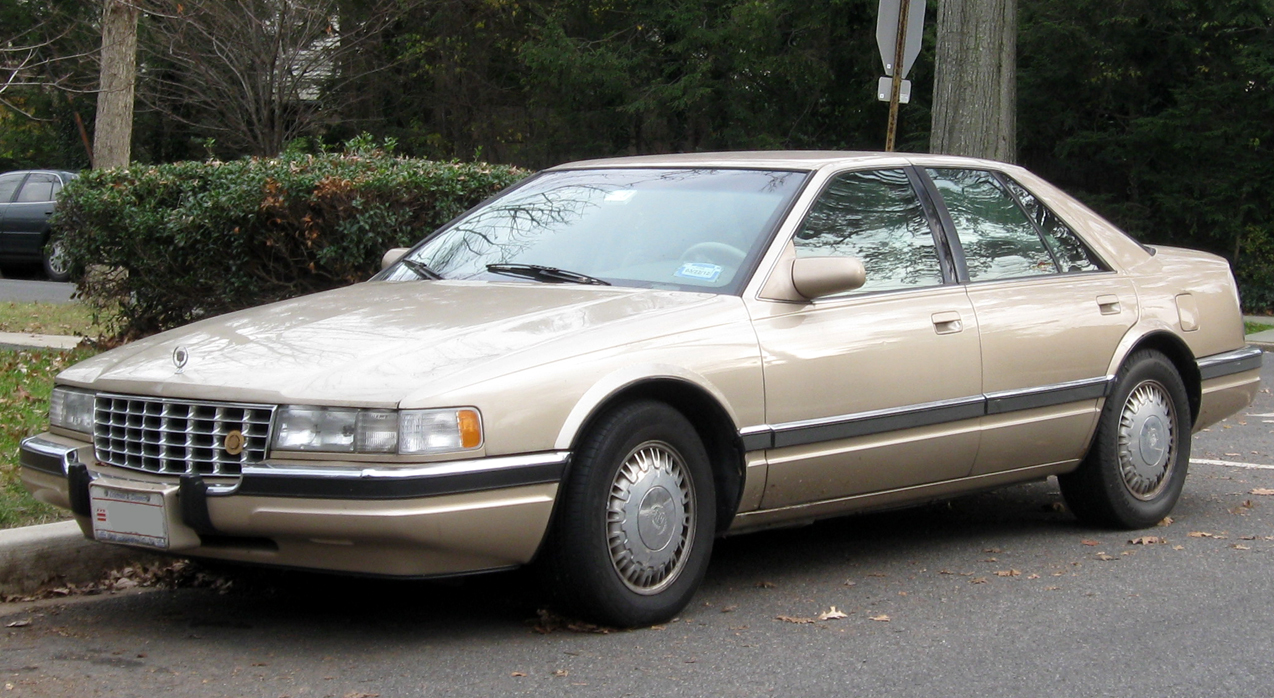
1992 Cadillac Seville

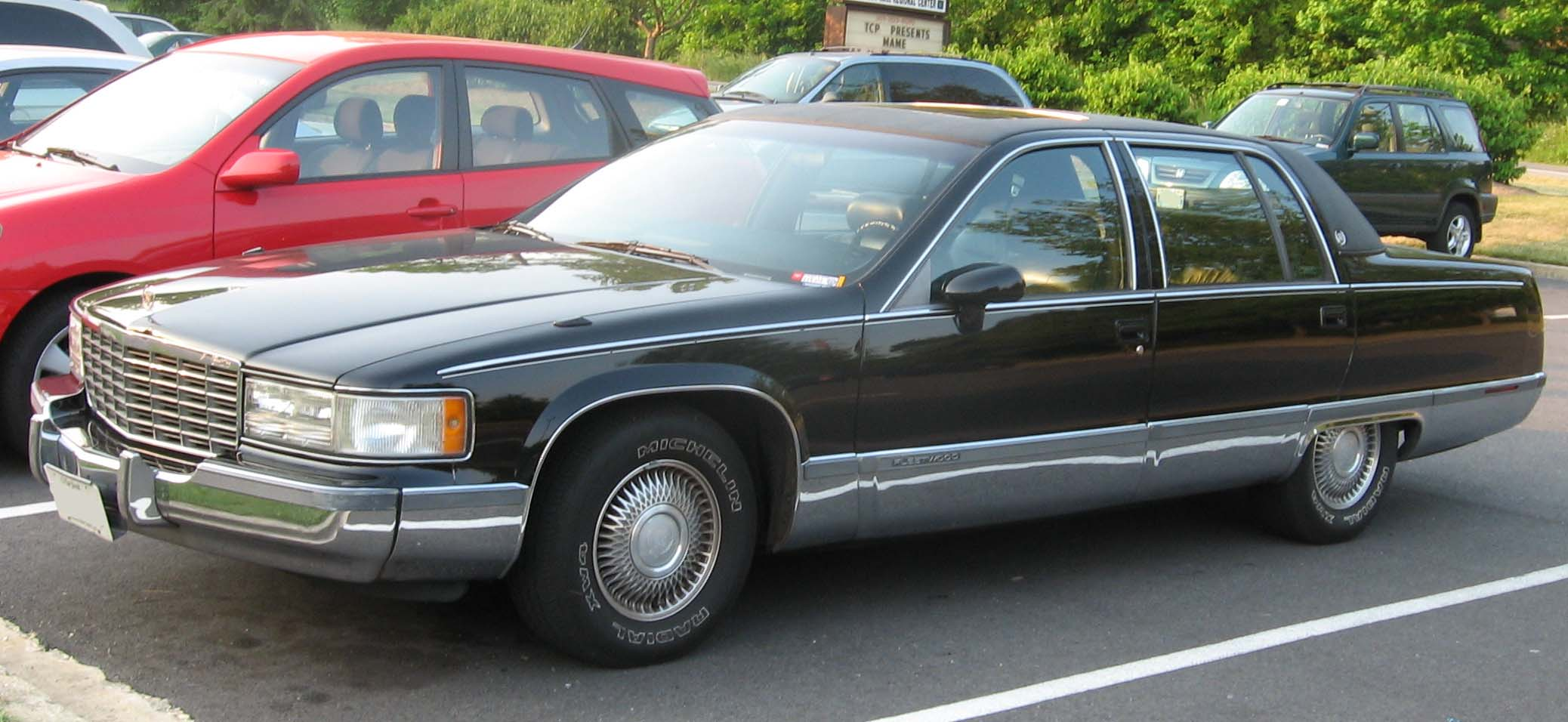
1993 Cadillac Fleetwood

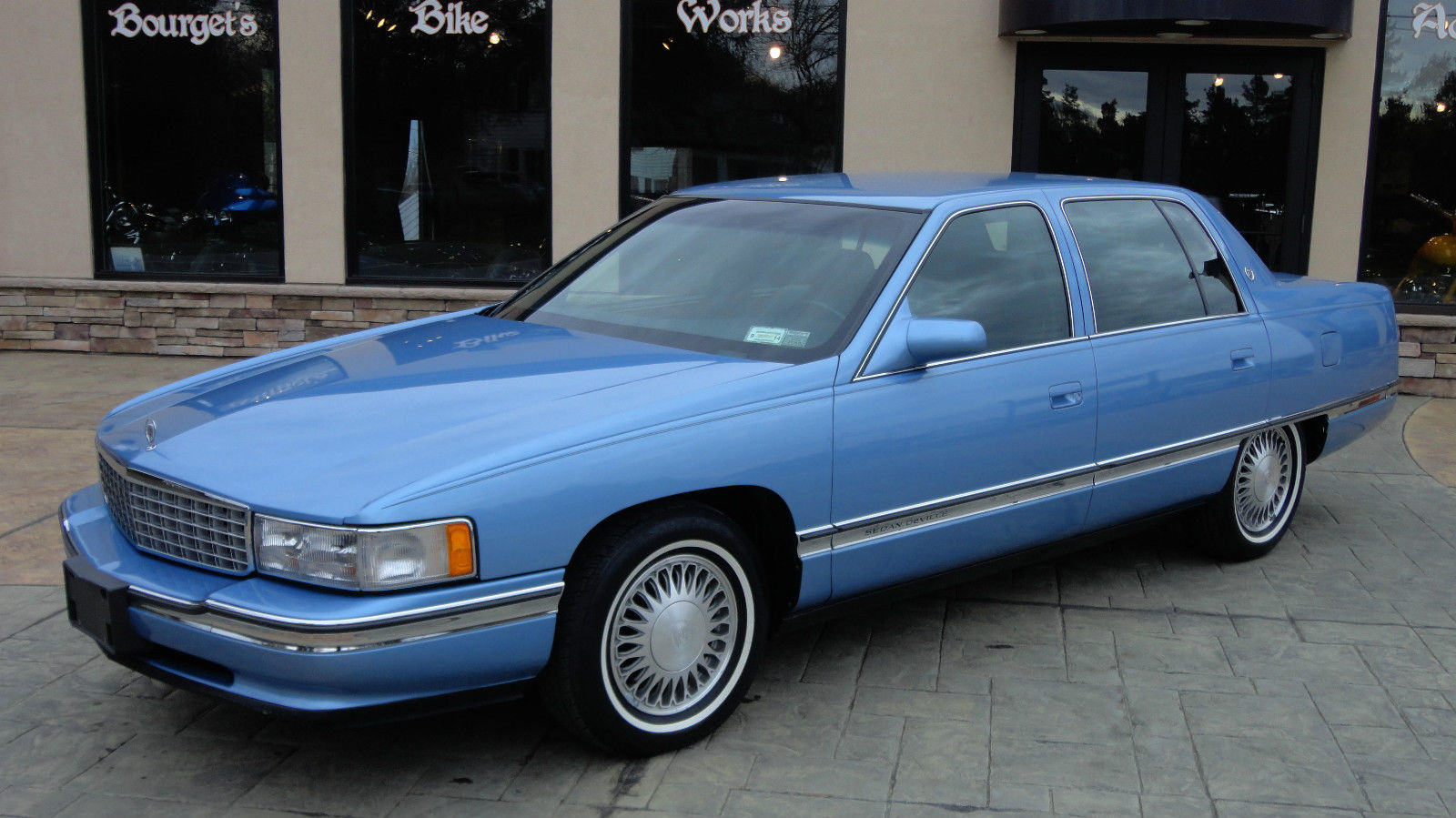
1994 Cadillac de Ville

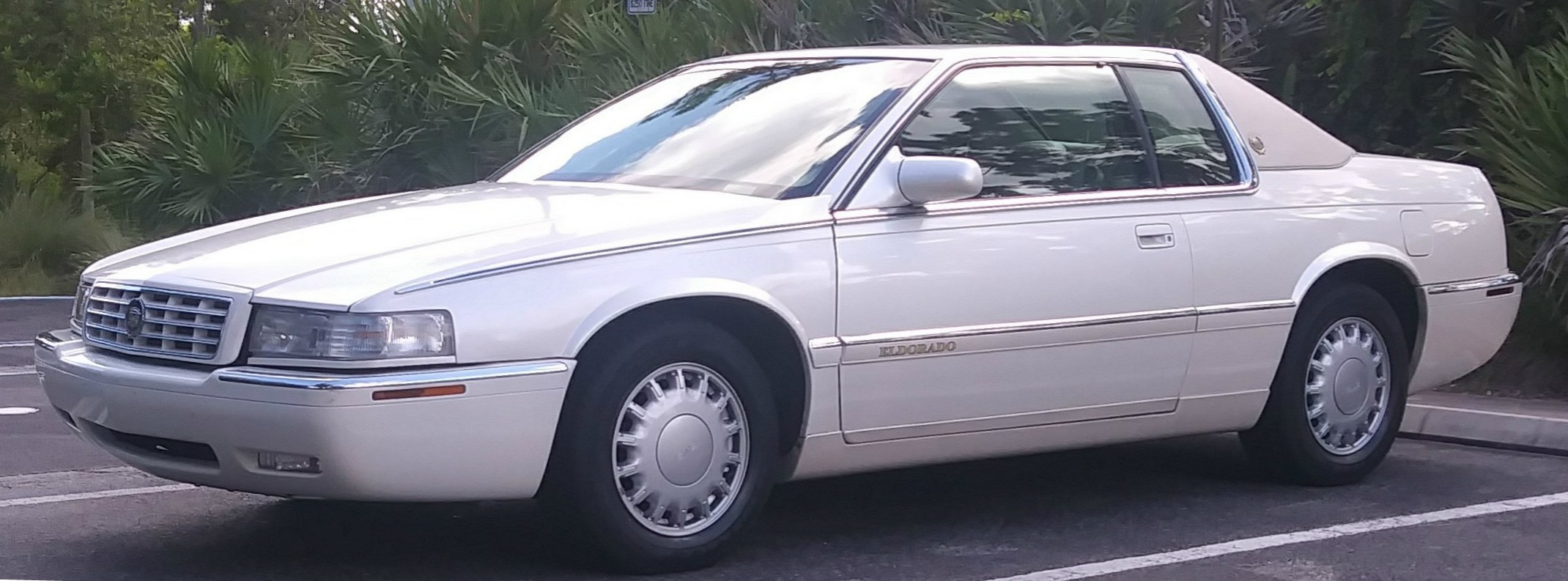
1995 Cadillac Eldorado

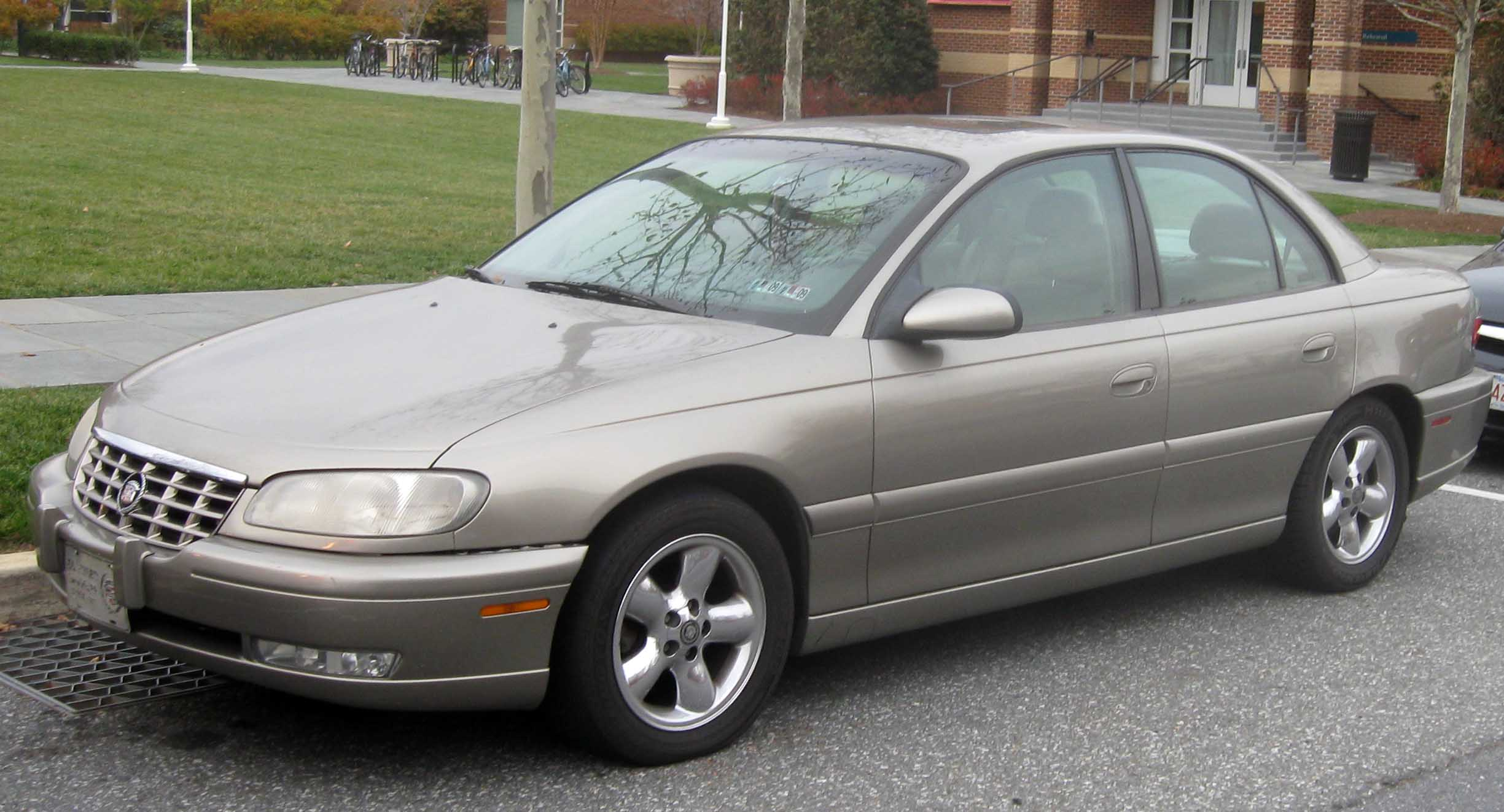
1997 Cadillac Catera

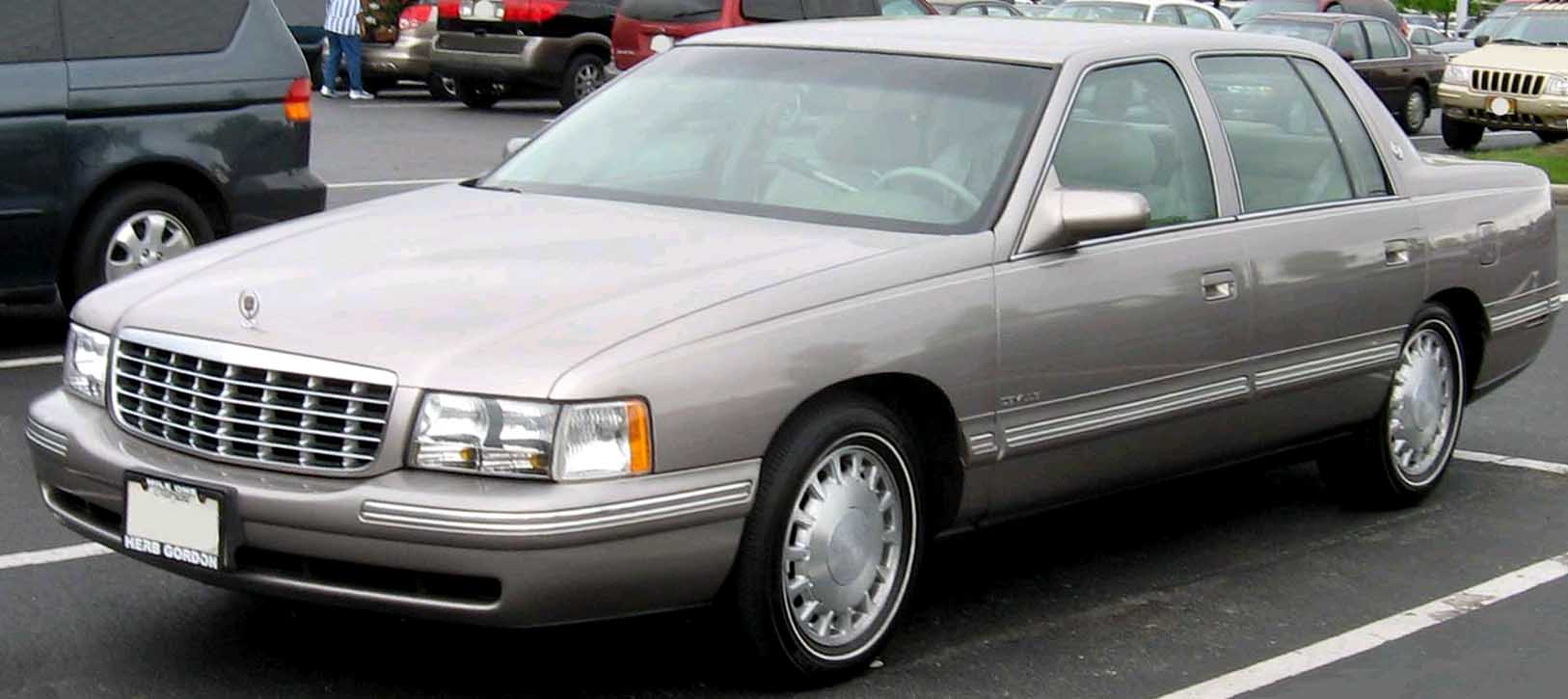
1997 Cadillac de Ville

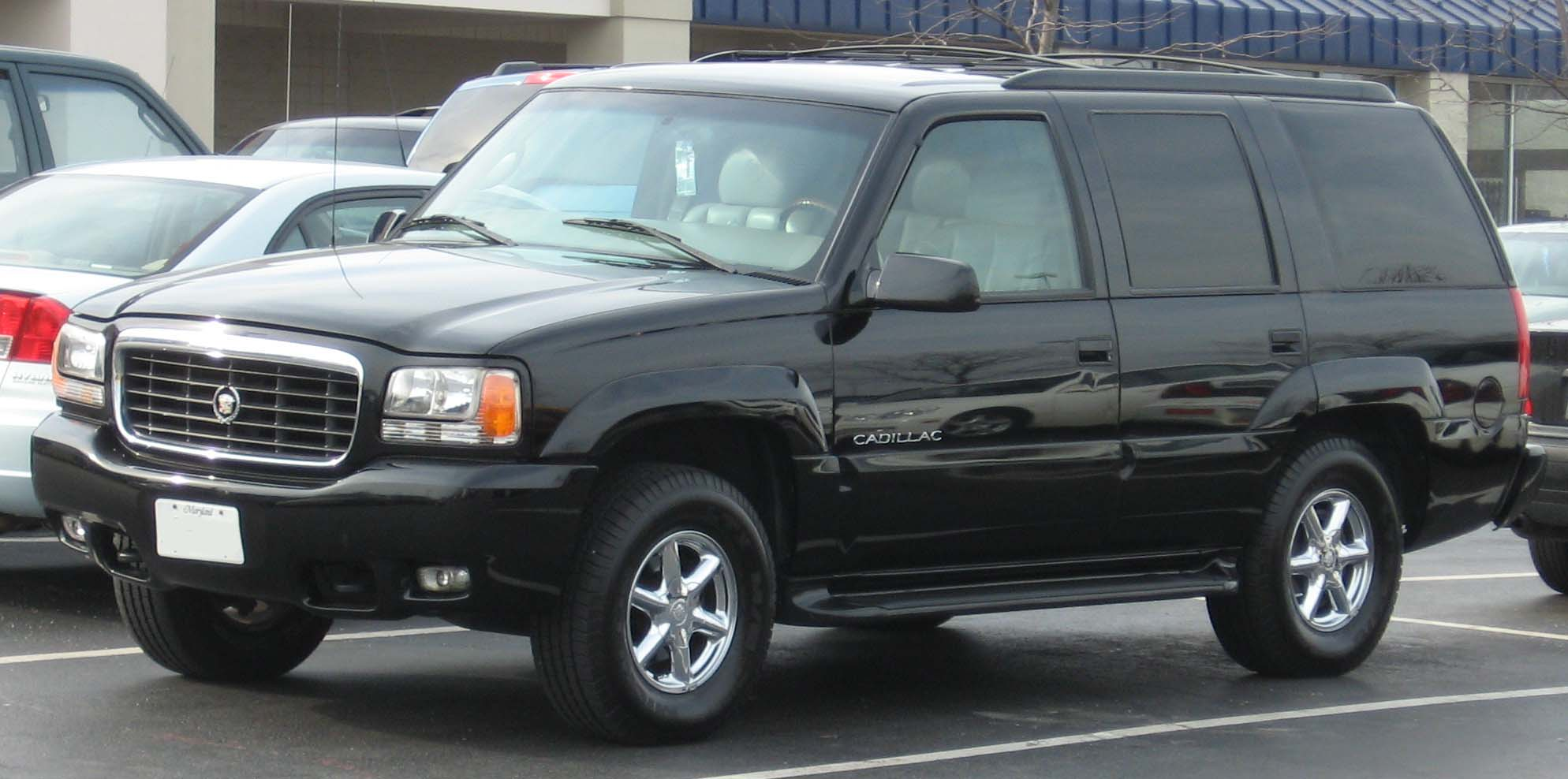
1999 Cadillac Escalade

=== The "Art and Science" era: 2000–present ===
The current internal combustion engine logo

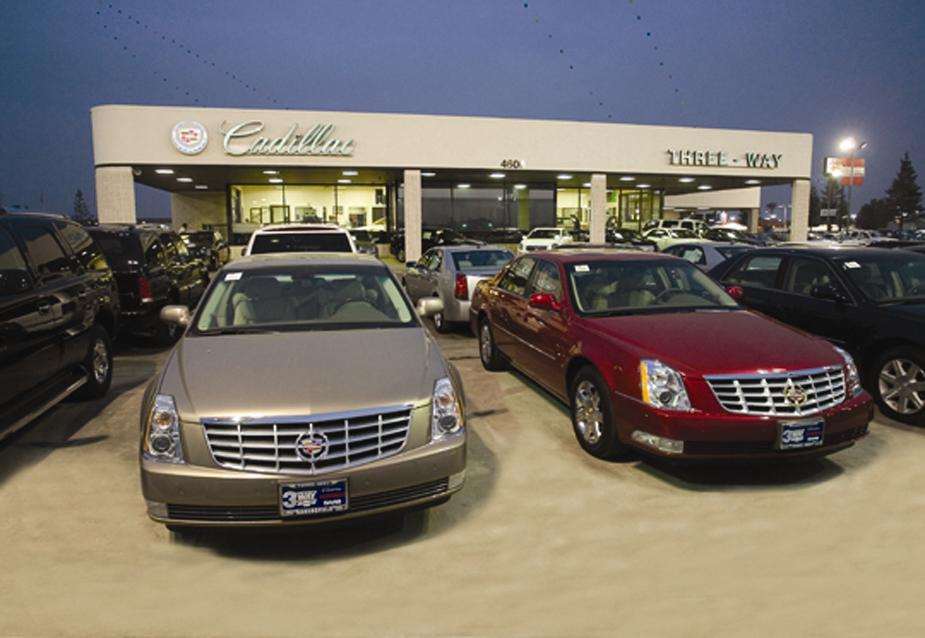
Cadillac dealership in Bakersfield, CA in 2006

In 2000, Cadillac introduced a new design philosophy for the 21st century called "Art and Science", which it states "incorporates sharp, sheer forms and crisp edges—a form vocabulary that expresses bold, high-technology design and invokes the technology used to design it." This new design language spread from the original CTS and to the Cadillac XLR roadster. Cadillac's model lineup mostly included rear- and all-wheel-drive sedans, roadsters, crossovers and SUVs. The only exceptions were the front-wheel drive compact executive Cadillac BLS (which was not sold in North America) and the Cadillac DTS, neither of which is still in production. The Cadillac BLS was developed by Saab in Trollhättan, Sweden. The BLS was a rebadged variant of the Saab 9-3 and was offered in both sedan and station wagon configurations. In 2005, the Cadillac STS was introduced as the successor to the Cadillac Seville, which beginning in 1988 was available as an upscale performance-oriented STS (for Seville touring sedan) version, and comfort-oriented SLS (for Seville luxury sedan). The following year, STS received Cadillac's then-new Northstar System, including the aluminium DOHC L37 Northstar V8 engine.

The STS was Cadillac's highest-priced sedan, falling in size between the mid-size CTS and full-size DTS. In 2006, the DeVille nameplate was replaced by Cadillac DTS, an abbreviation dating back to 1986, when a "DeVille Touring Sedan" package was first available. The new name brought the DeVille into line with Cadillac's Art and Science-era nomenclature, which saw the Seville renamed the STS and the Catera replacement called the CTS. The last DeVille rolled off the Detroit/Hamtramck Assembly line on June 23, 2005.

The new second-generation CTS-V performance sedan was introduced in 2009 as a direct competitor to the BMW M5. Powered by a supercharged OHV 6.2 L LSA V8 engine, an automatic version of the CTS-V lapped the Nürburgring in 7:59.32, at the time a record for production sedans. The last DTS rolled off the assembly line at 11:51 a.m. on May 27, 2011. It was replaced by the Cadillac XTS which debuted in 2012 as a 2013 model. The Cadillac ATS compact sedan also debuted in 2012 as a 2013 model and a coupe version of the ATS was added two years later.

In 2016, the Cadillac CT6 was introduced and was the brand's first full-size rear-wheel-drive sedan since the discontinuation of the Fleetwood in 1996. In early 2017, Cadillac launched Book By Cadillac, a vehicle subscription service which was initially available in New York City. In November 2017, it was announced that Book by Cadillac would be expanding to Dallas and Los Angeles.

The Cadillac XT6, a new seven-seat luxury mid-size crossover SUV, was introduced on January 12, 2019, at the North American International Auto Show. It went on sale in the third quarter of 2019 as a 2020 model. Other additions to the Cadillac lineup for the 2020 model year included the CT5 mid-size luxury sedan, replacing the CTS, and the CT4 compact sedan which replaced the ATS. Performance "V" versions of the CT4 and CT5 were also added for 2020.

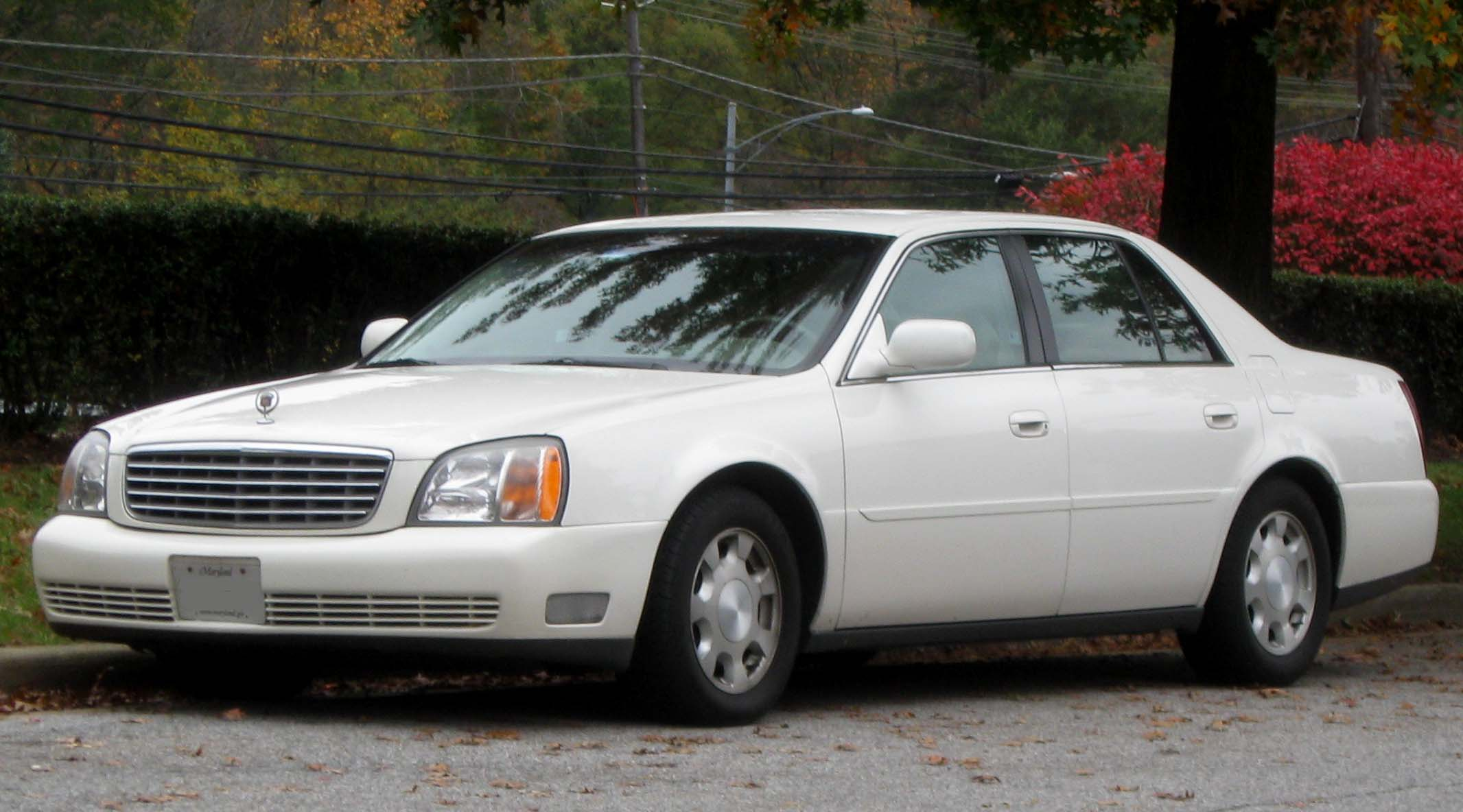
2000 Cadillac DeVille

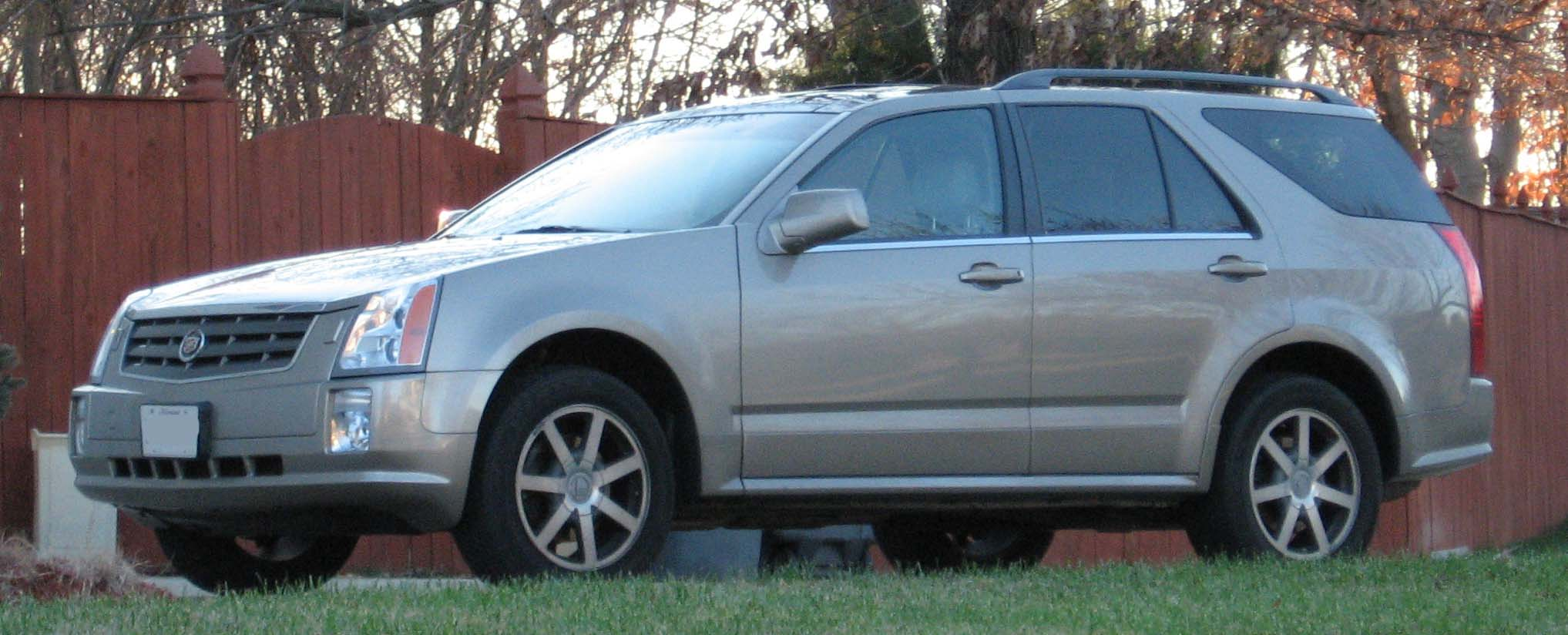
2005 Cadillac SRX

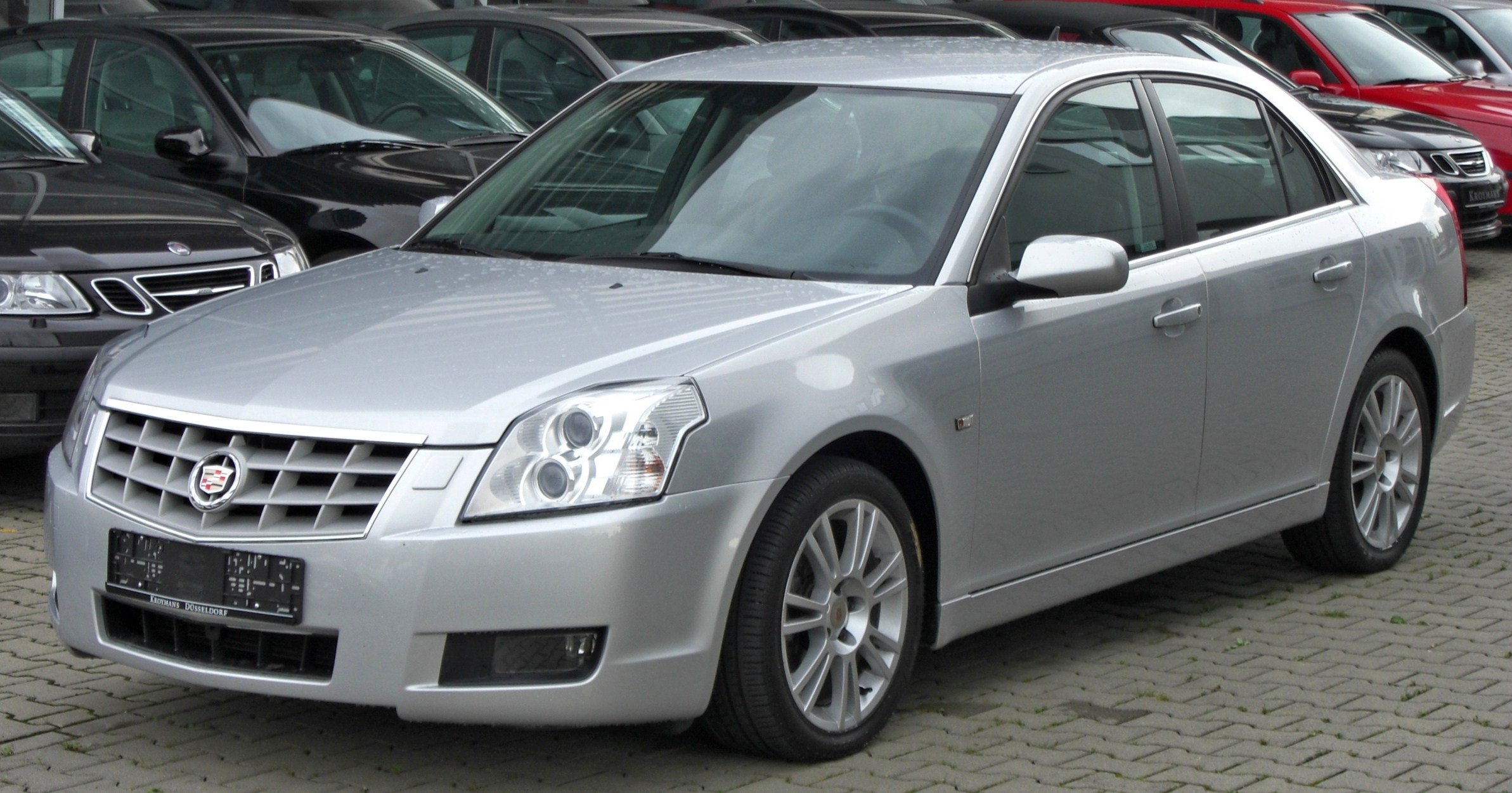
2006 Cadillac BLS

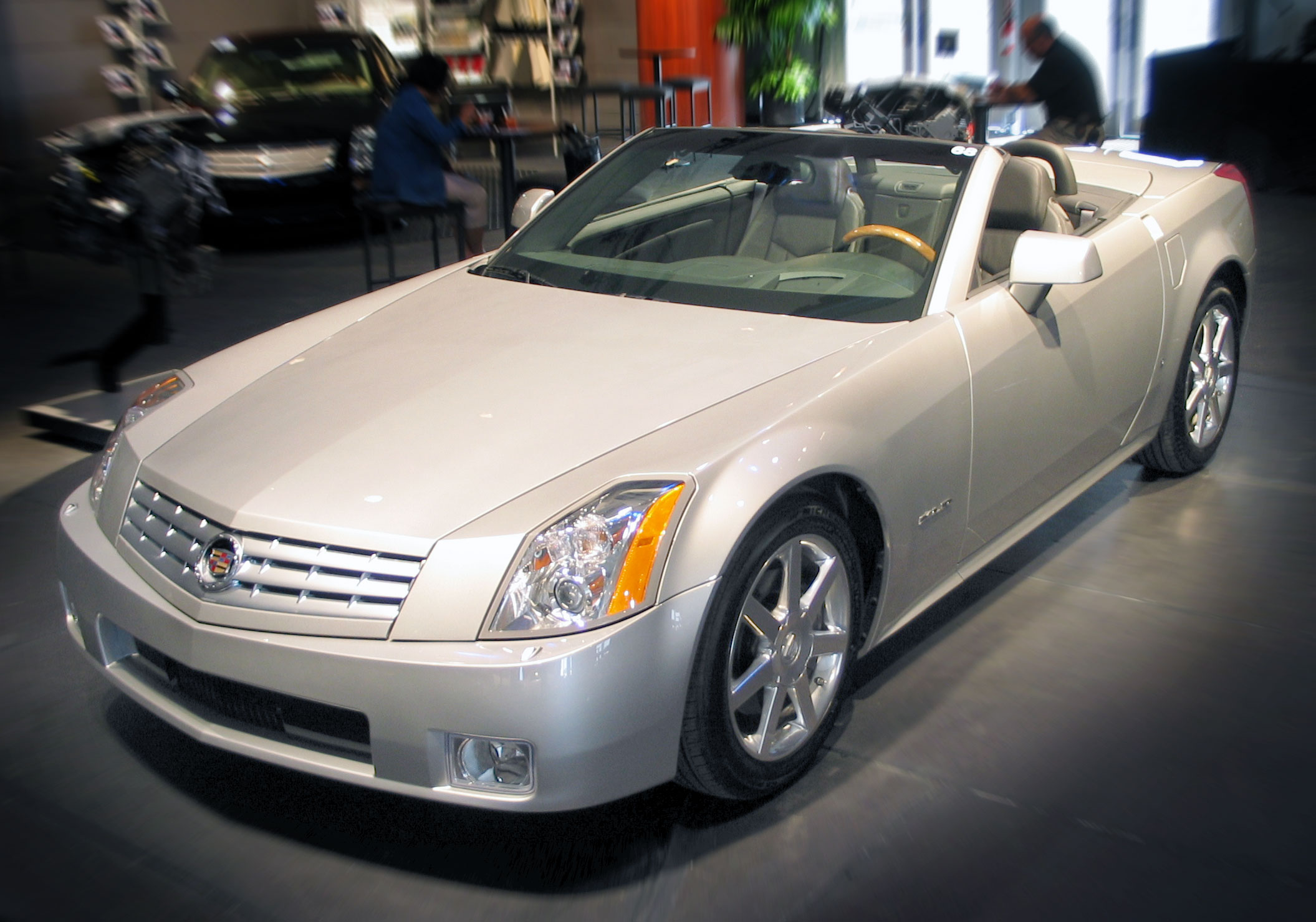
2006 Cadillac XLR

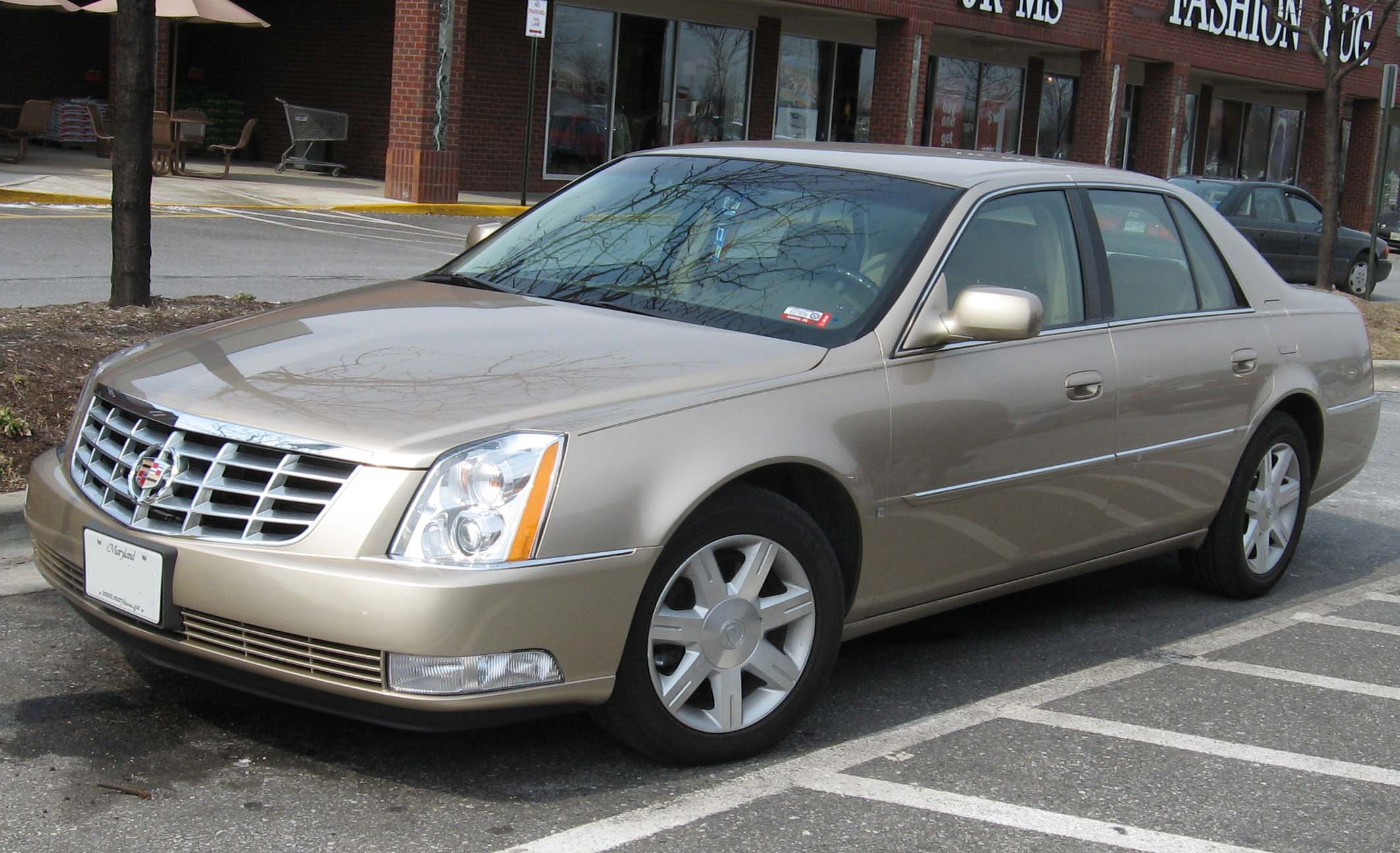
2007 Cadillac DTS

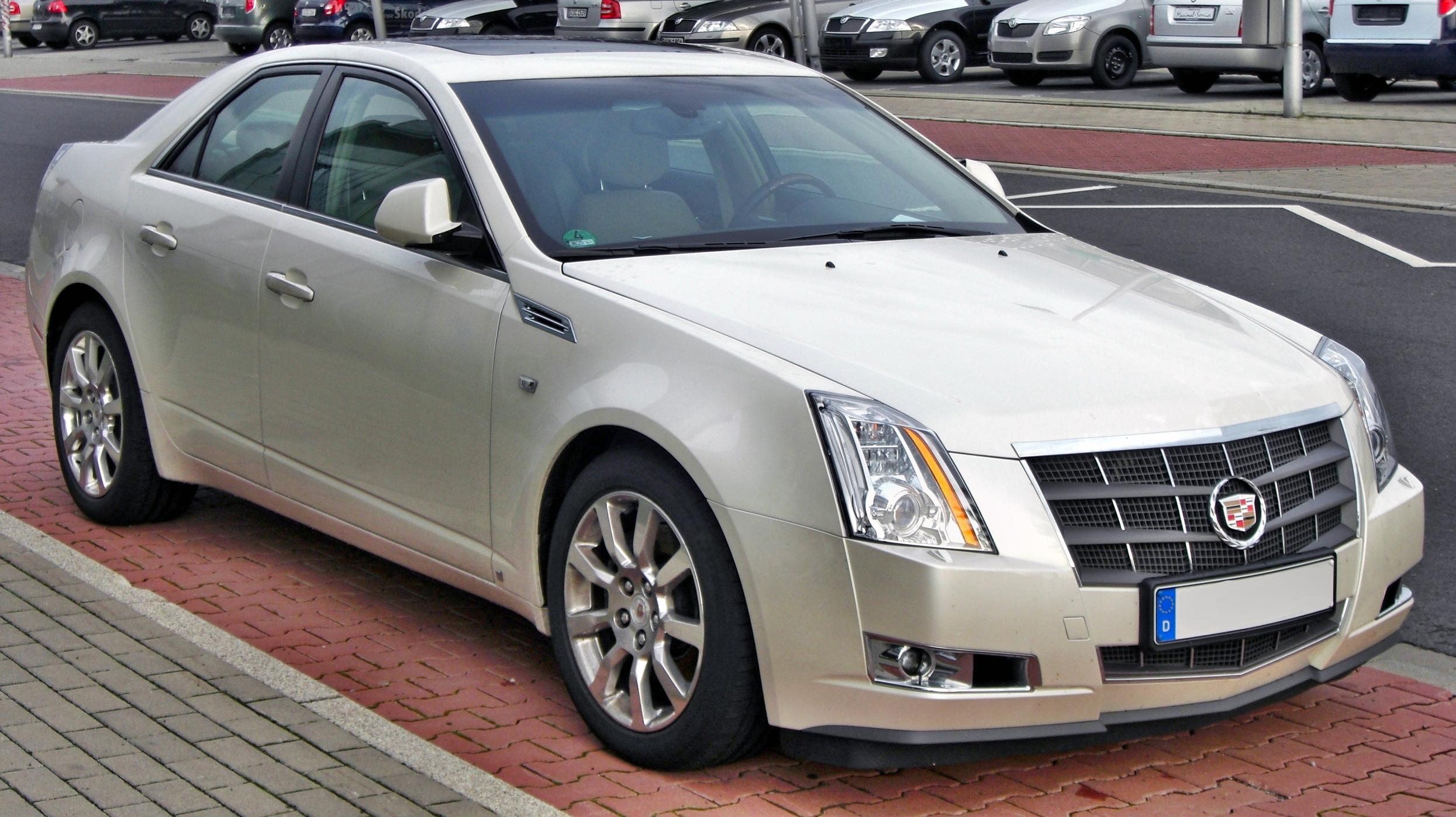
2008 Cadillac CTS

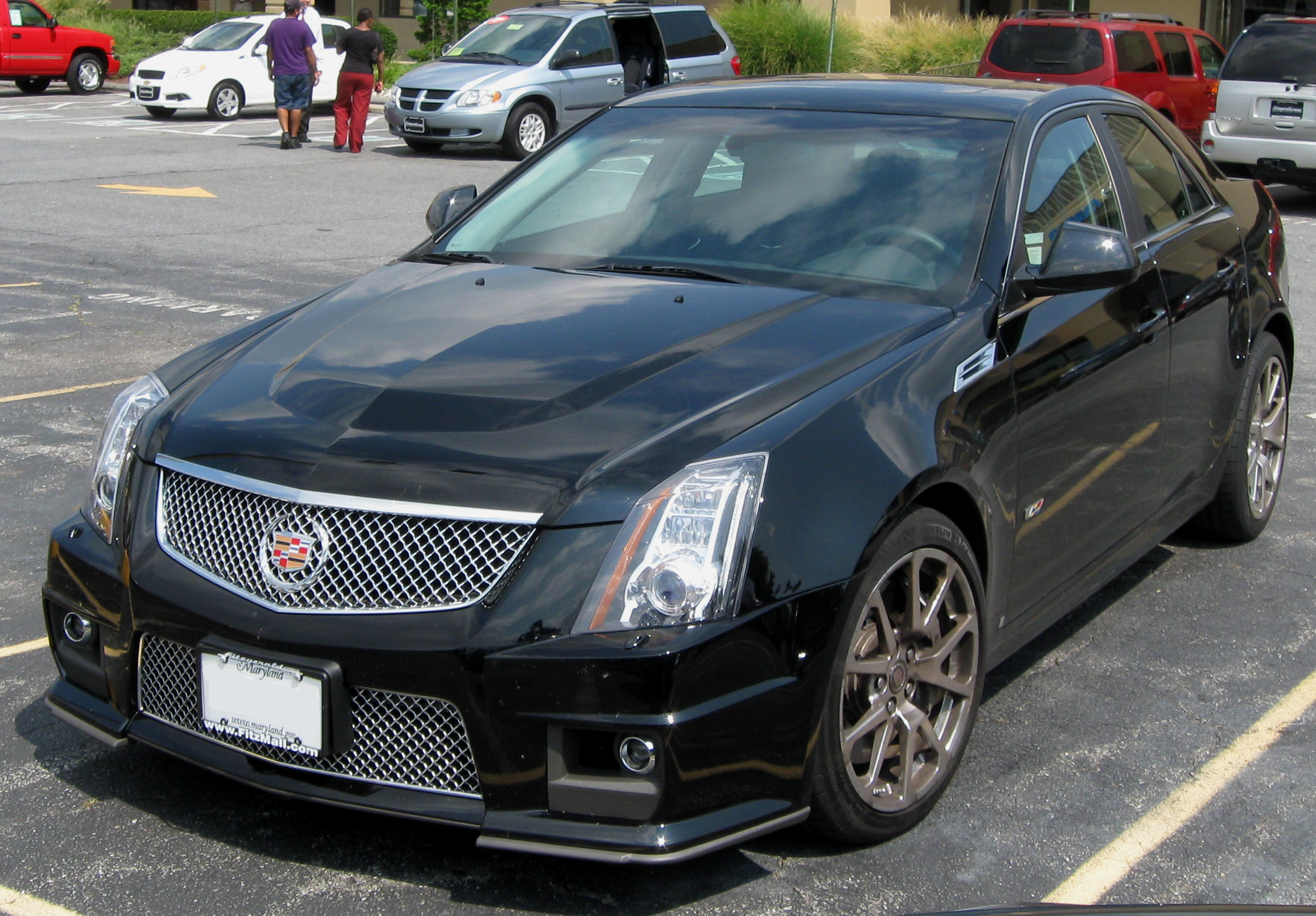
2009 Cadillac CTS-V

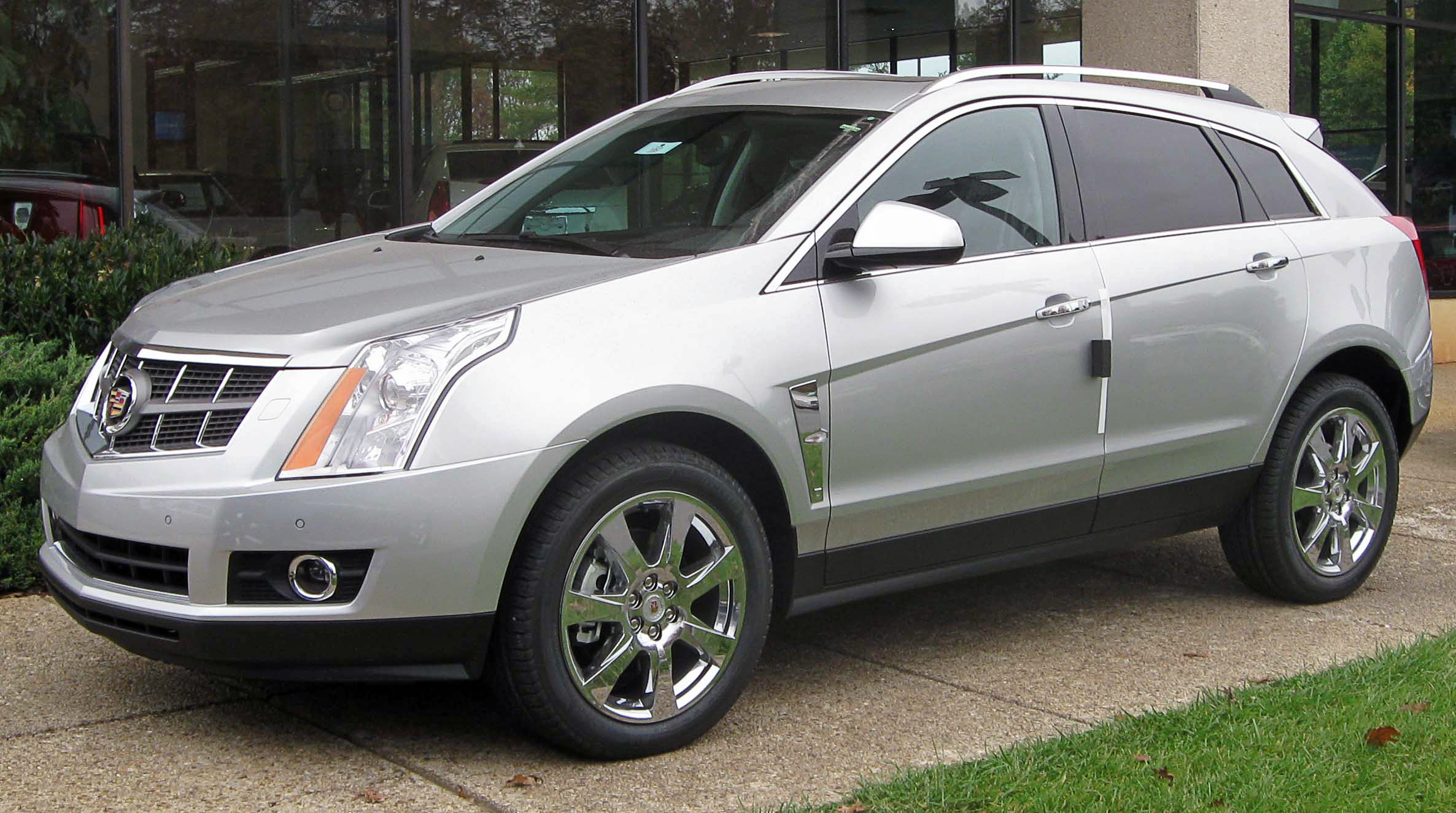
2010 Cadillac SRX

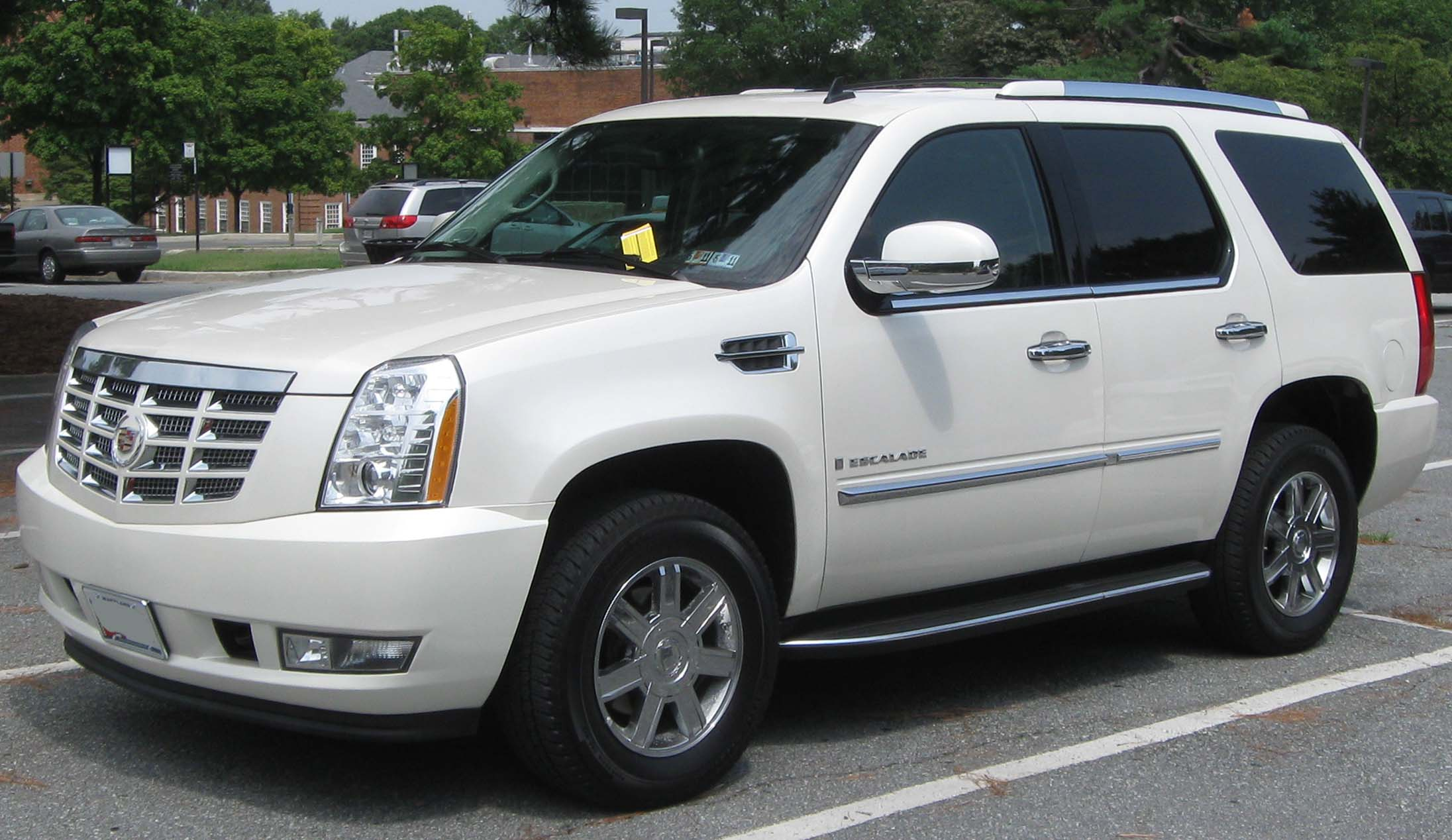
2010 Cadillac Escalade

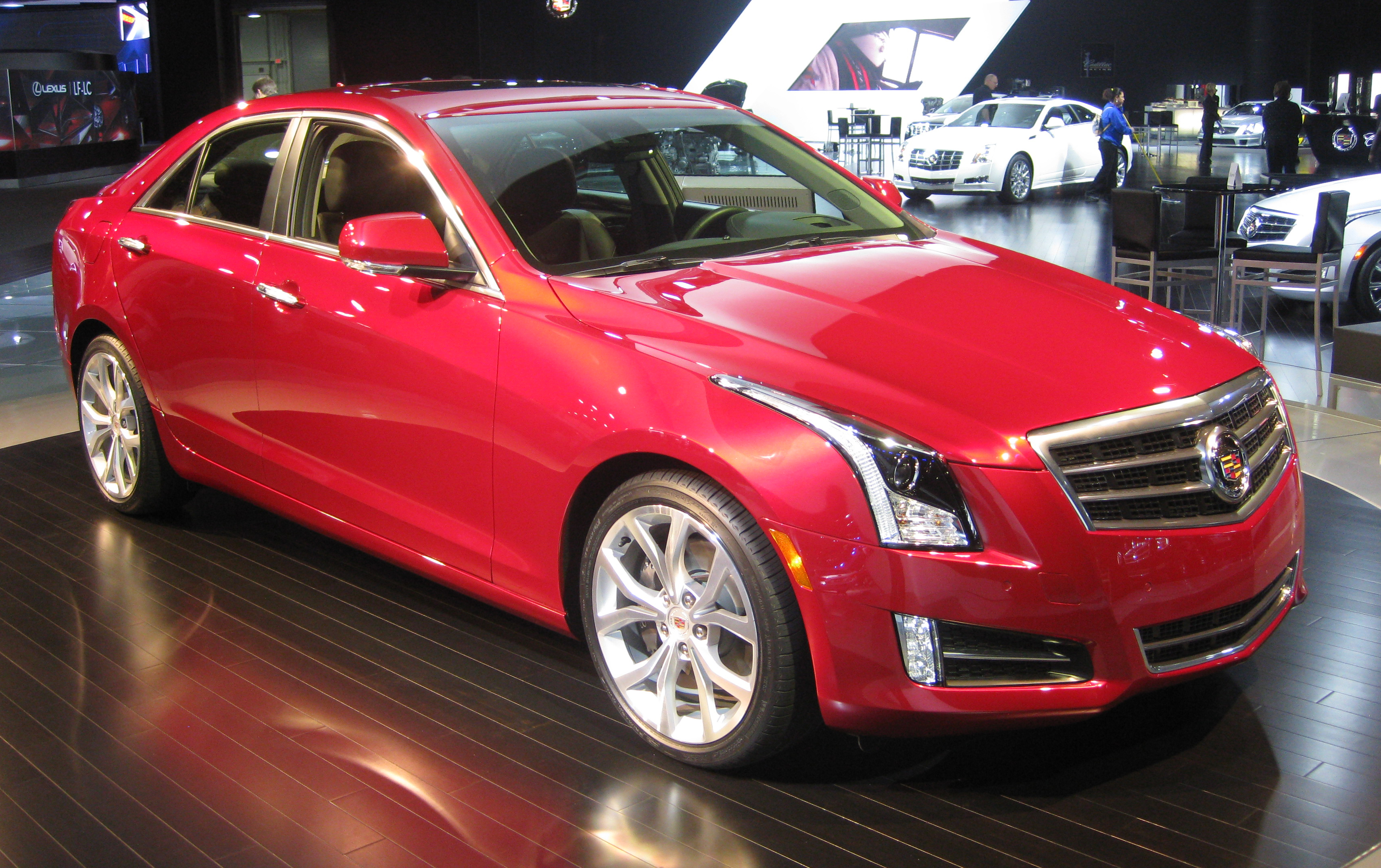
2013 Cadillac ATS

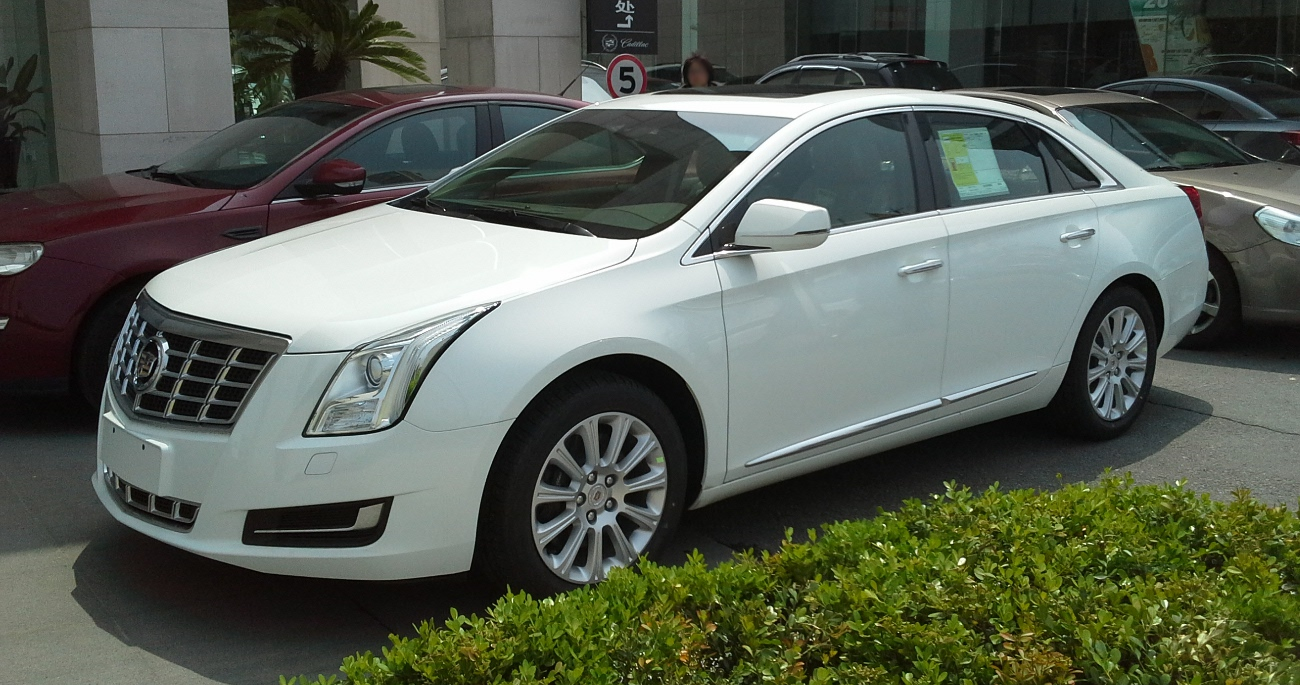
2013 Cadillac XTS

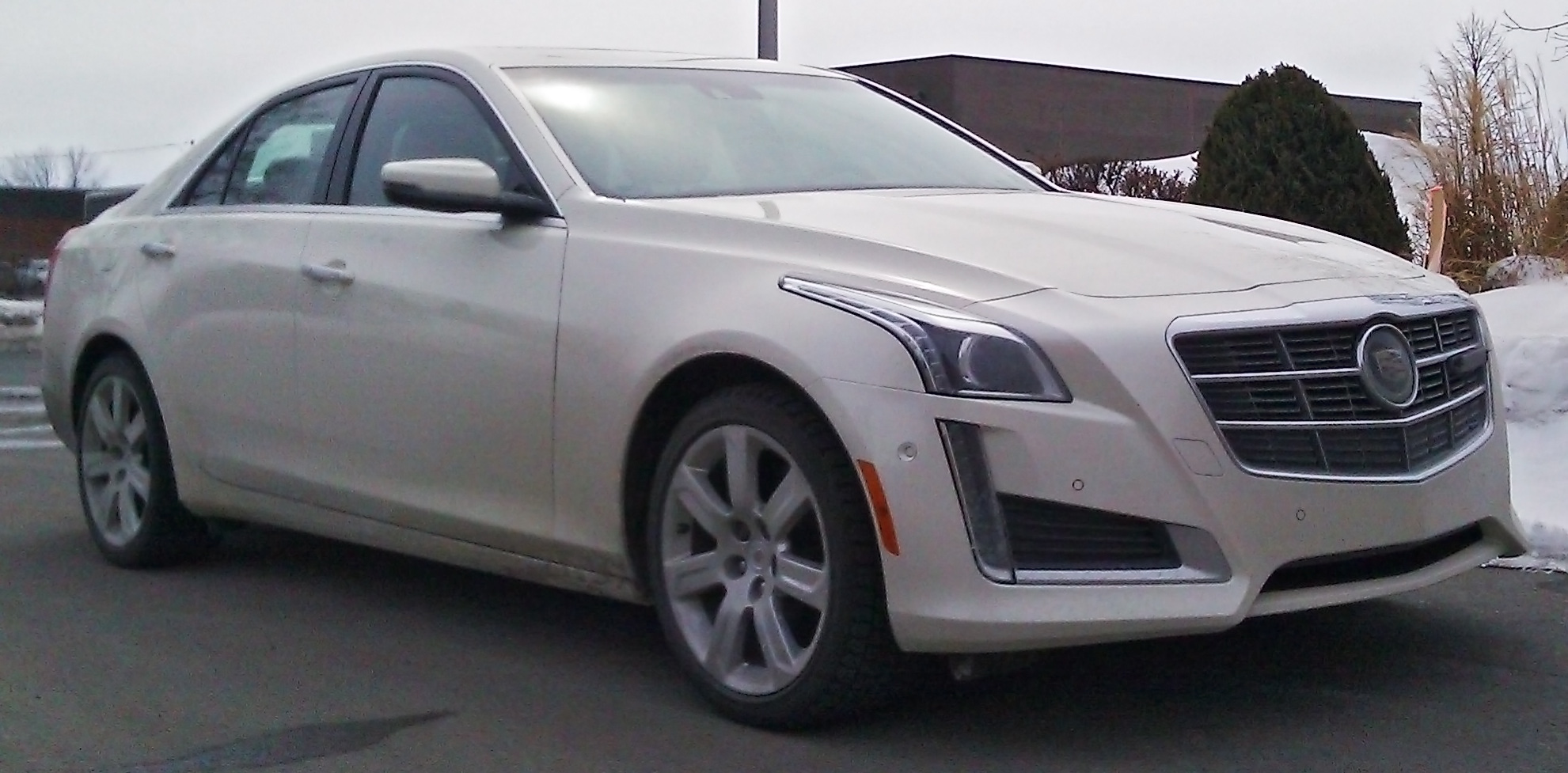
2014 Cadillac CTS

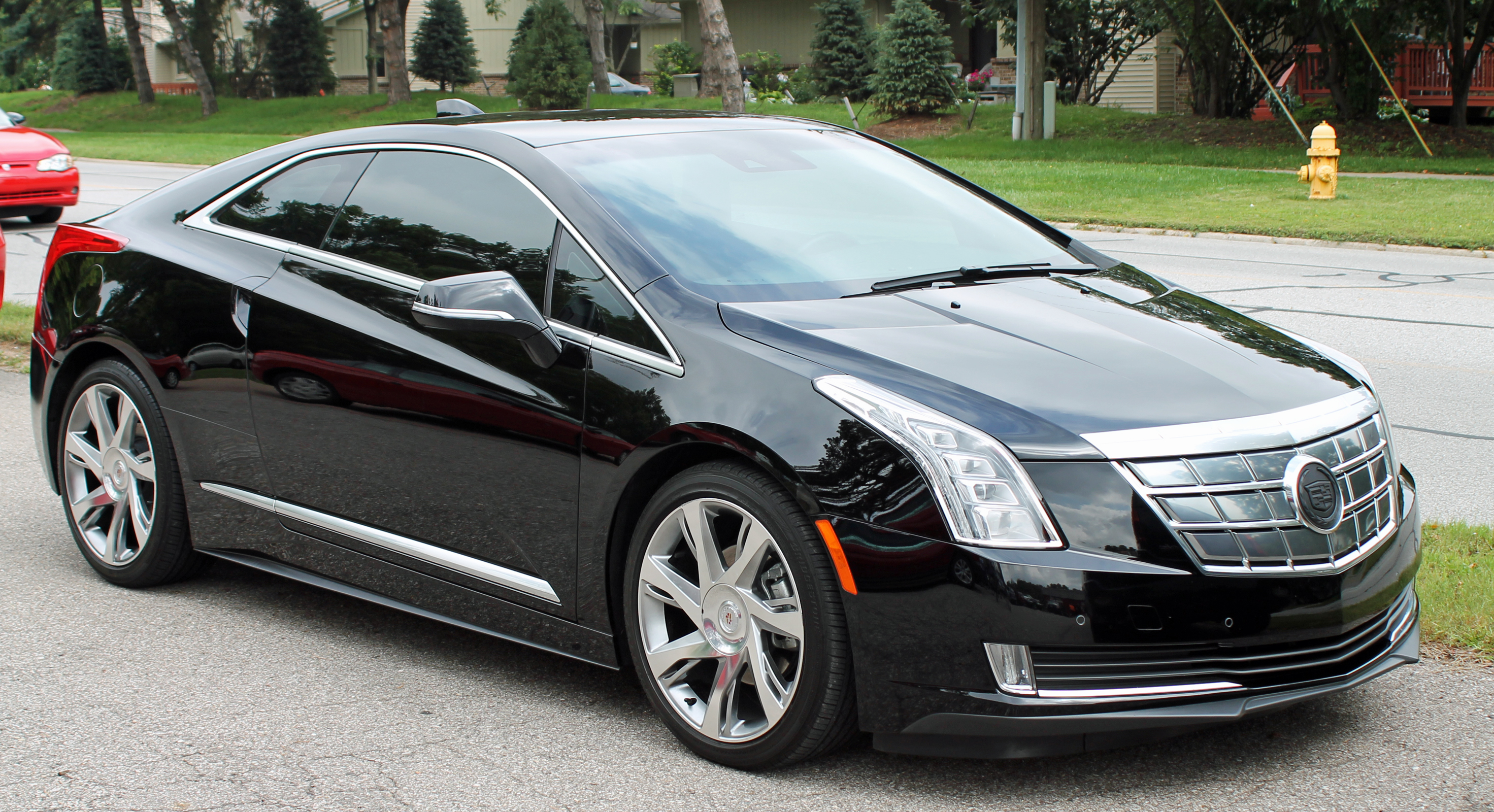
2014 Cadillac ELR

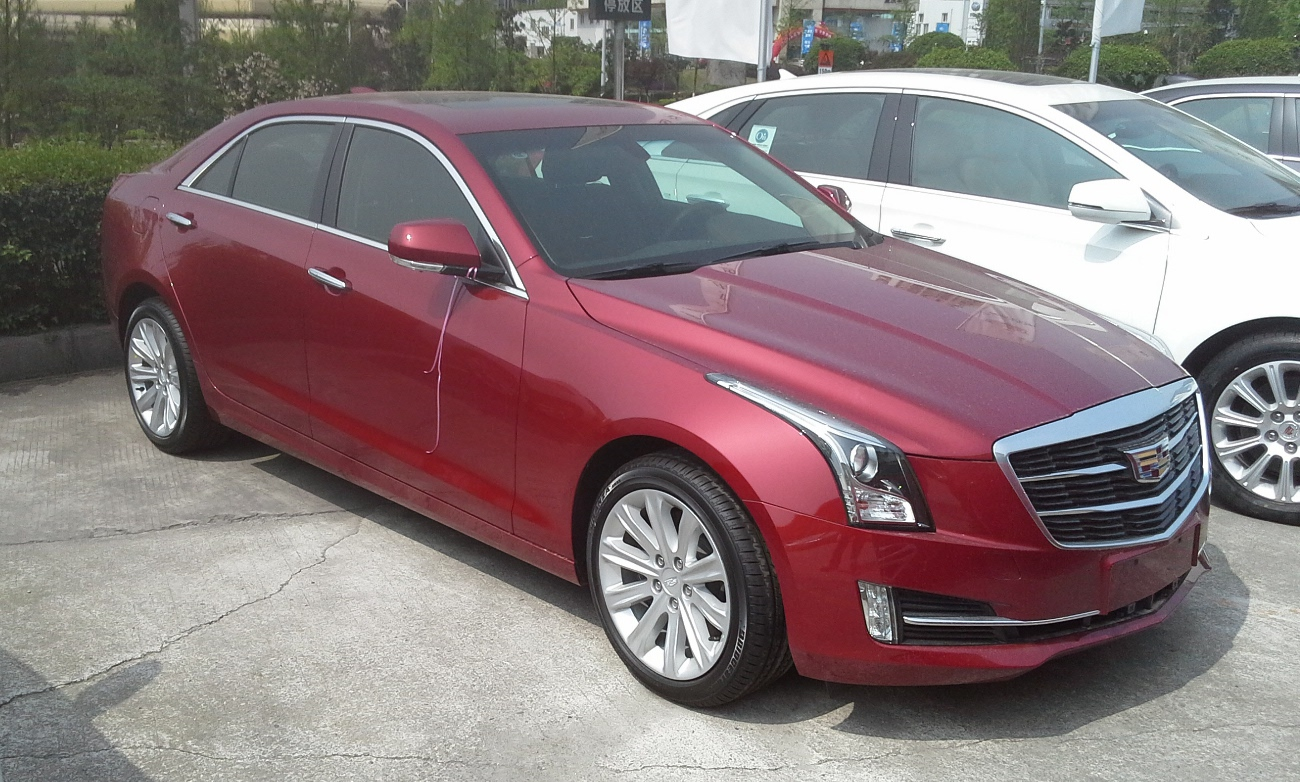
2015 Cadillac ATS-L (China)

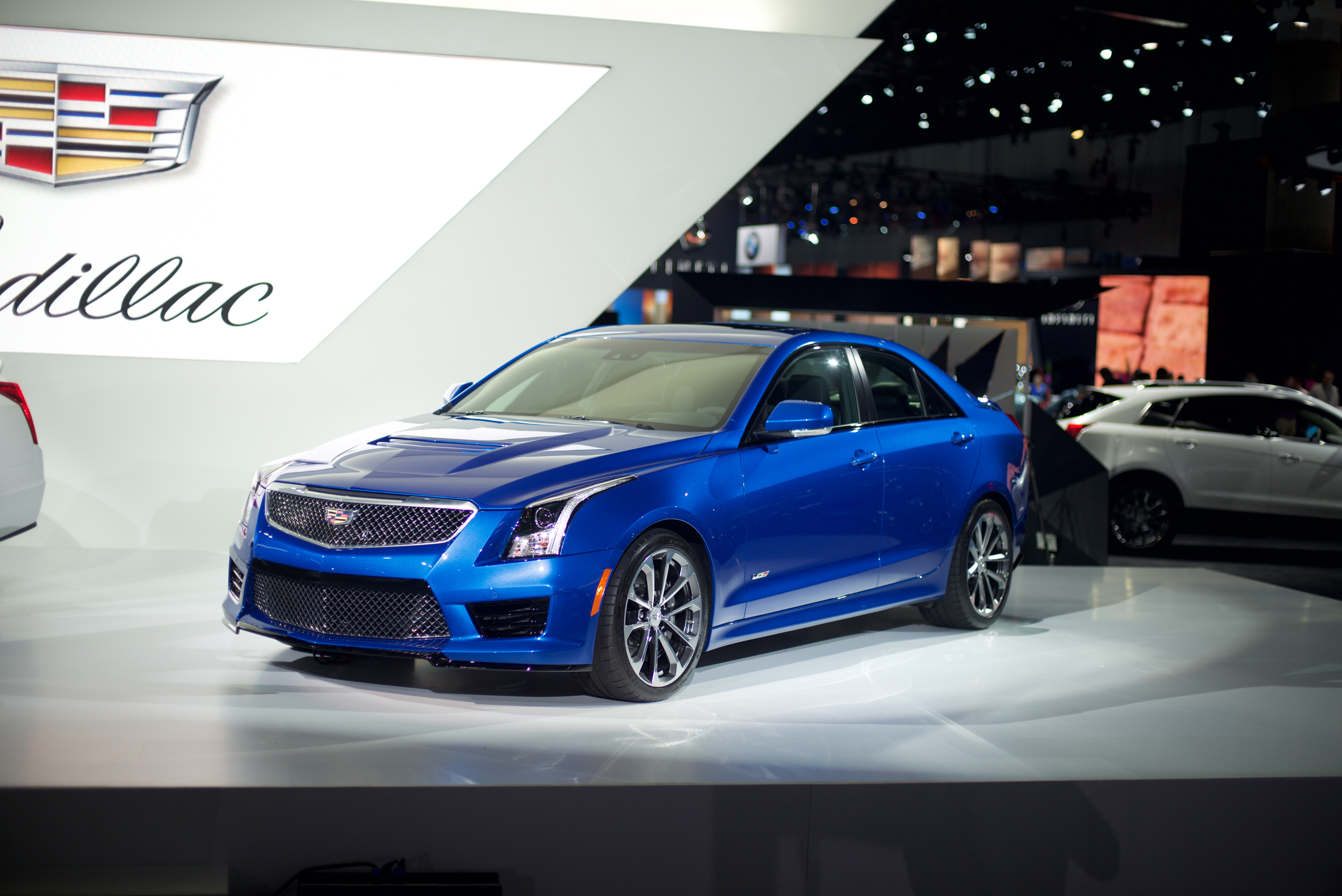
2016 Cadillac ATS-V

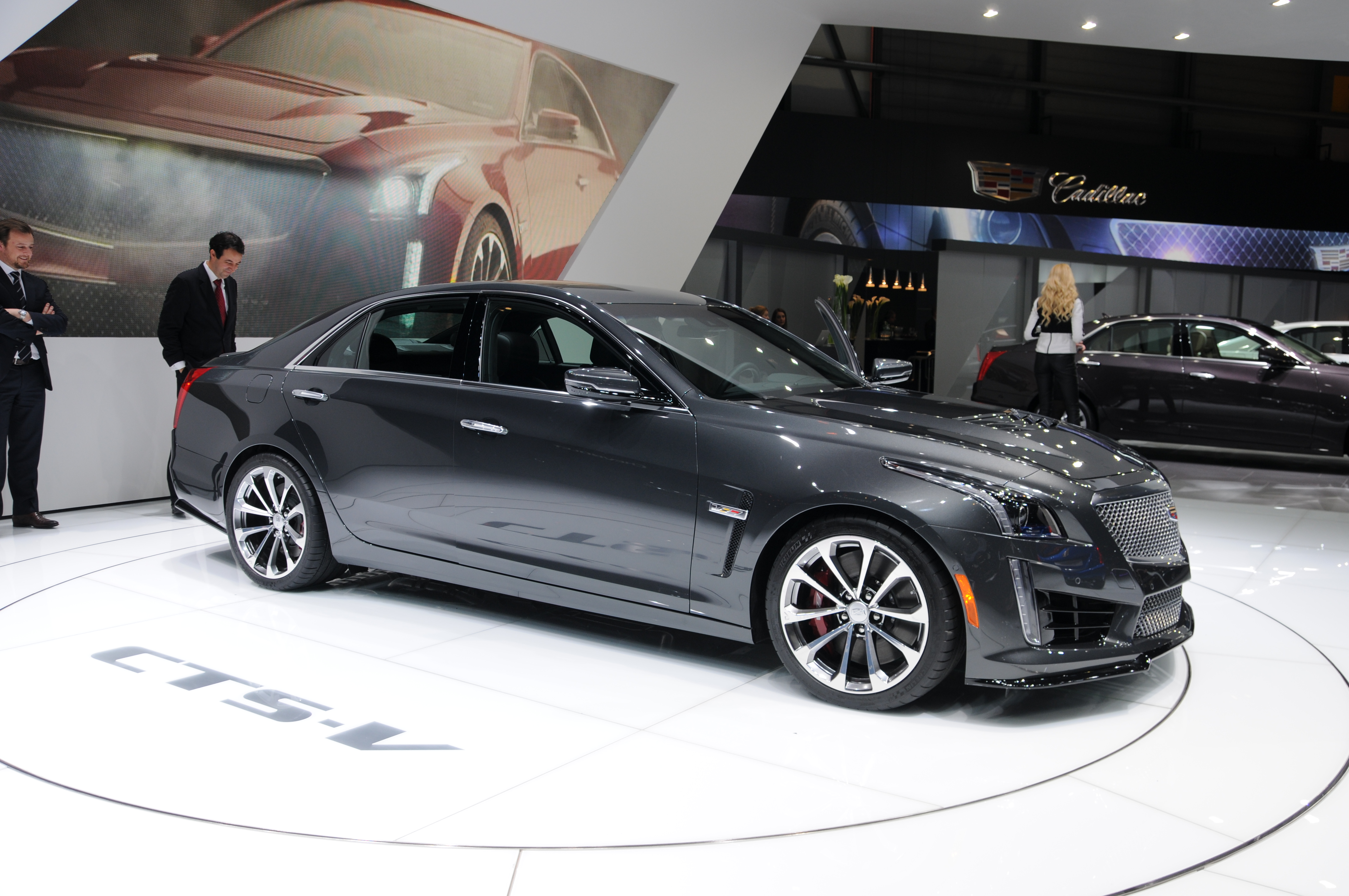
2016 Cadillac CTS-V

== Leadership ==
- Henry M. Leland (1902–1917)
- Richard H. Collins (1917–1921)
- Herbert H. Rice (1921–1925)
- Lawrence P. Fisher (1925–1934)
- Nicholas Dreystadt (1934–1946)
- John F. Gordon (1946–1950)
- Don E. Ahrans (1950–1956)
- Harold G. Werner (1956–1964)
- Calvin J. Werner (1964–1969)
- Fred W. Macdonald (1969–1973)
- Robert D. Lund (1973–1978)
- Edward C. Kennard (1978–1983)
- Robert C. Stempel (1983–1984)
- John O. Grettenberger (1984–1997)
- John F. Smith (1998–2001)
- Mark LaNeve (2001–2004)
- Jim Taylor (2005–2009)
- Mark McNabb (2008–2009)
- Bryan Nesbitt (2009–2010)
- Bob Ferguson (2012–2014)
- Johan de Nysschen (2014–2018)
- Steve Carlisle (2018–2020)
- Rory Harvey (2021–2023)
- John Roth (2023–2025)
- Kristian Aquilina (2026–present)

== Models ==
Current

- 1999–present Escalade
  - 1999–present Escalade
  - 2003–present Escalade ESV
- 2016–present CT6
- 2017–present XT5
- 2019–present XT4
- 2020–present CT4
  - 2020–present CT4
  - 2020–present CT4-V
- 2020–present CT5
  - 2020–present CT5
  - 2020–present CT5-V
- 2020–present XT6
- 2023–present Lyriq
  - 2025–present Lyriq-V
- 2023–present Optiq
  - 2025–present Optiq-V
- 2024–present Celestiq
- 2024–present Escalade IQ
- 2025–present Vistiq
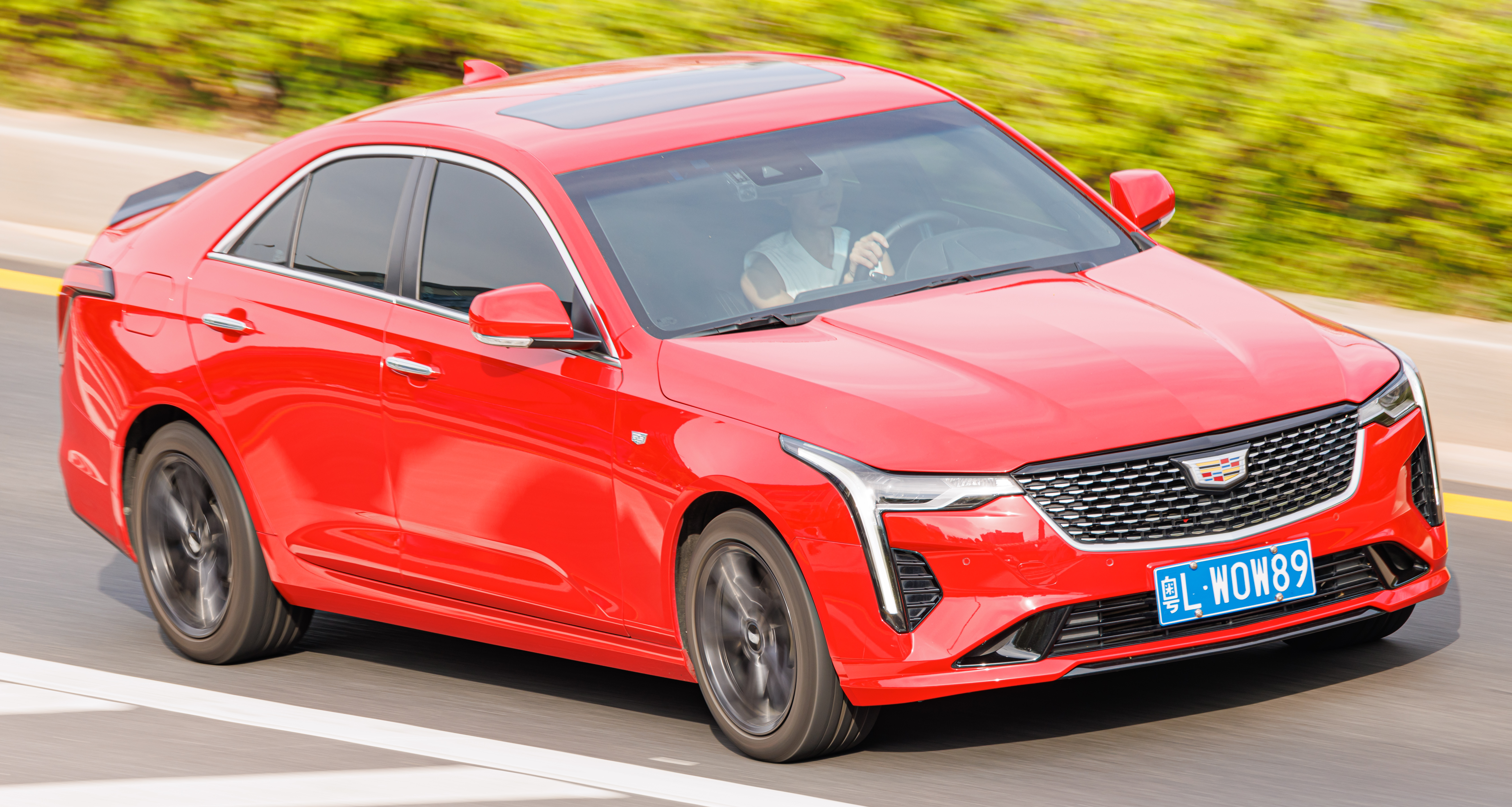
Cadillac CT4

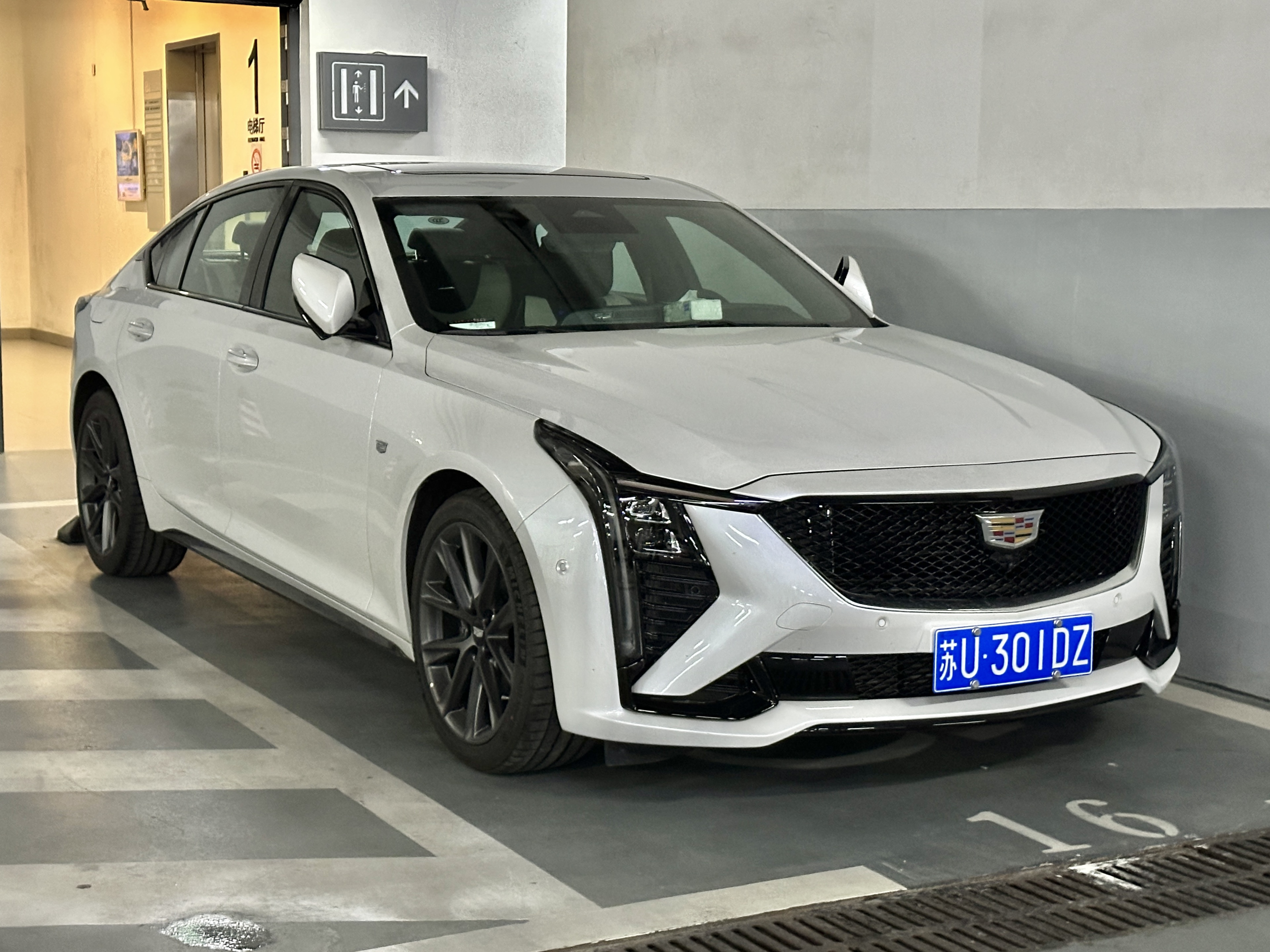
Cadillac CT5

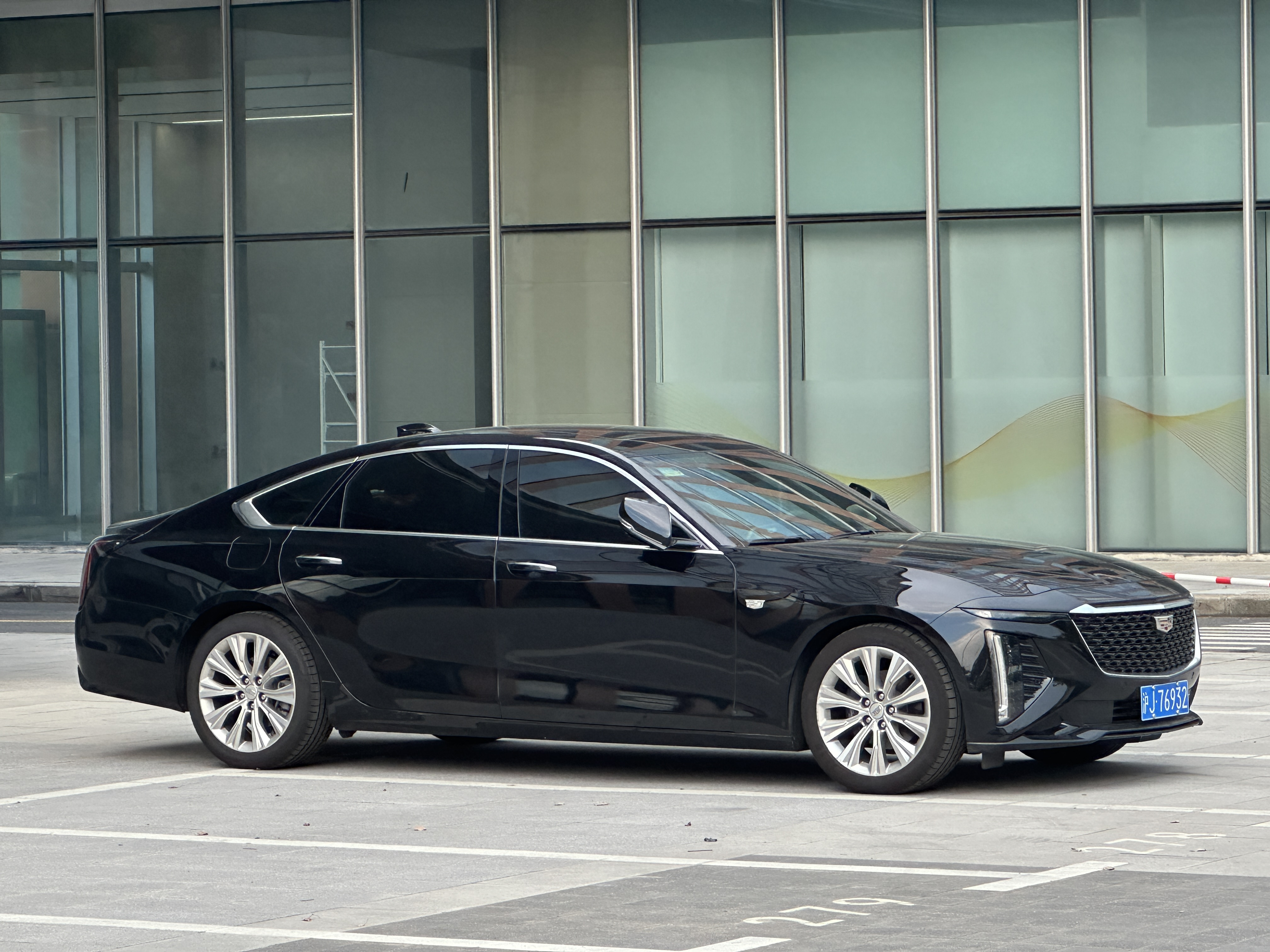
Cadillac CT6

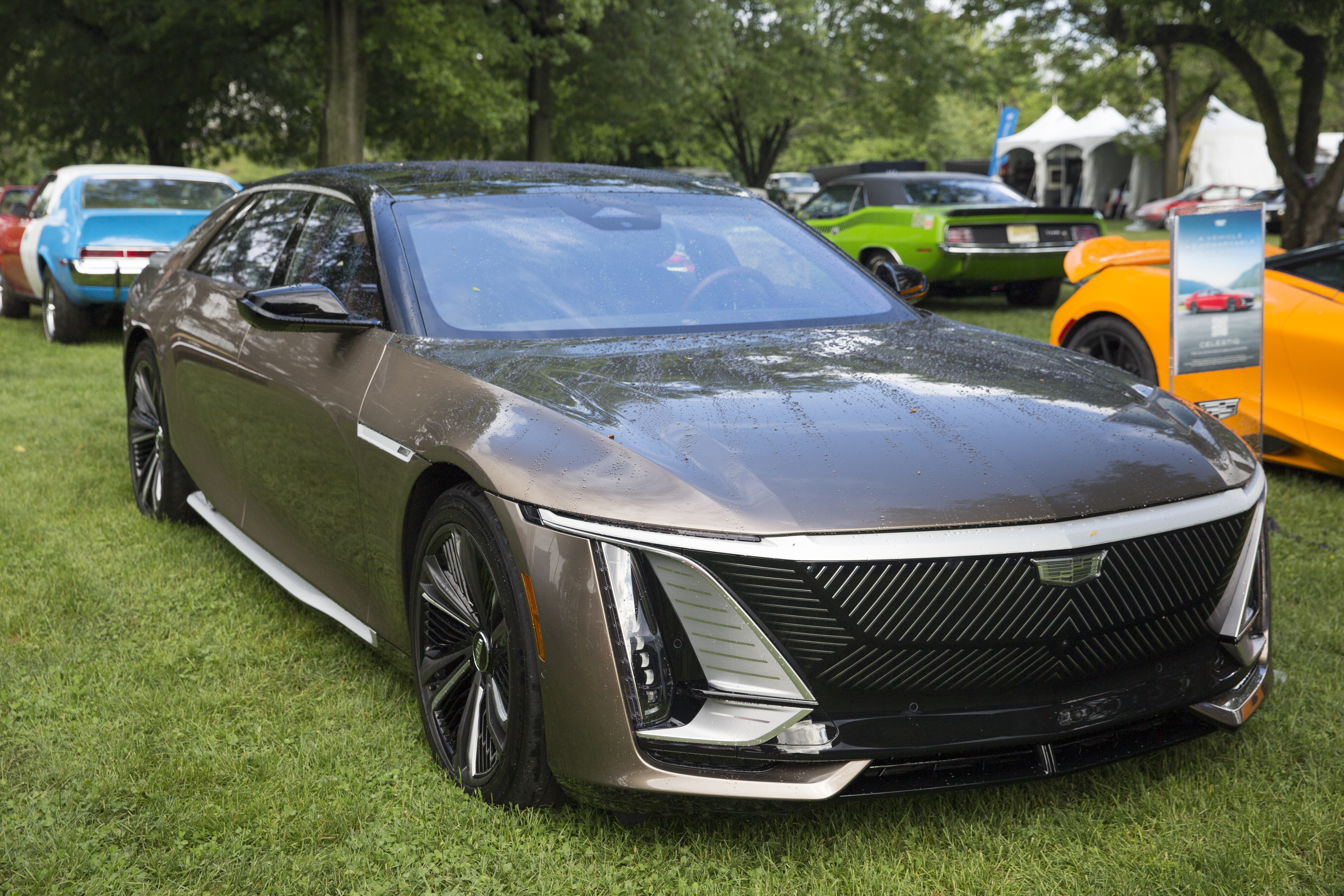
Cadillac Celestiq

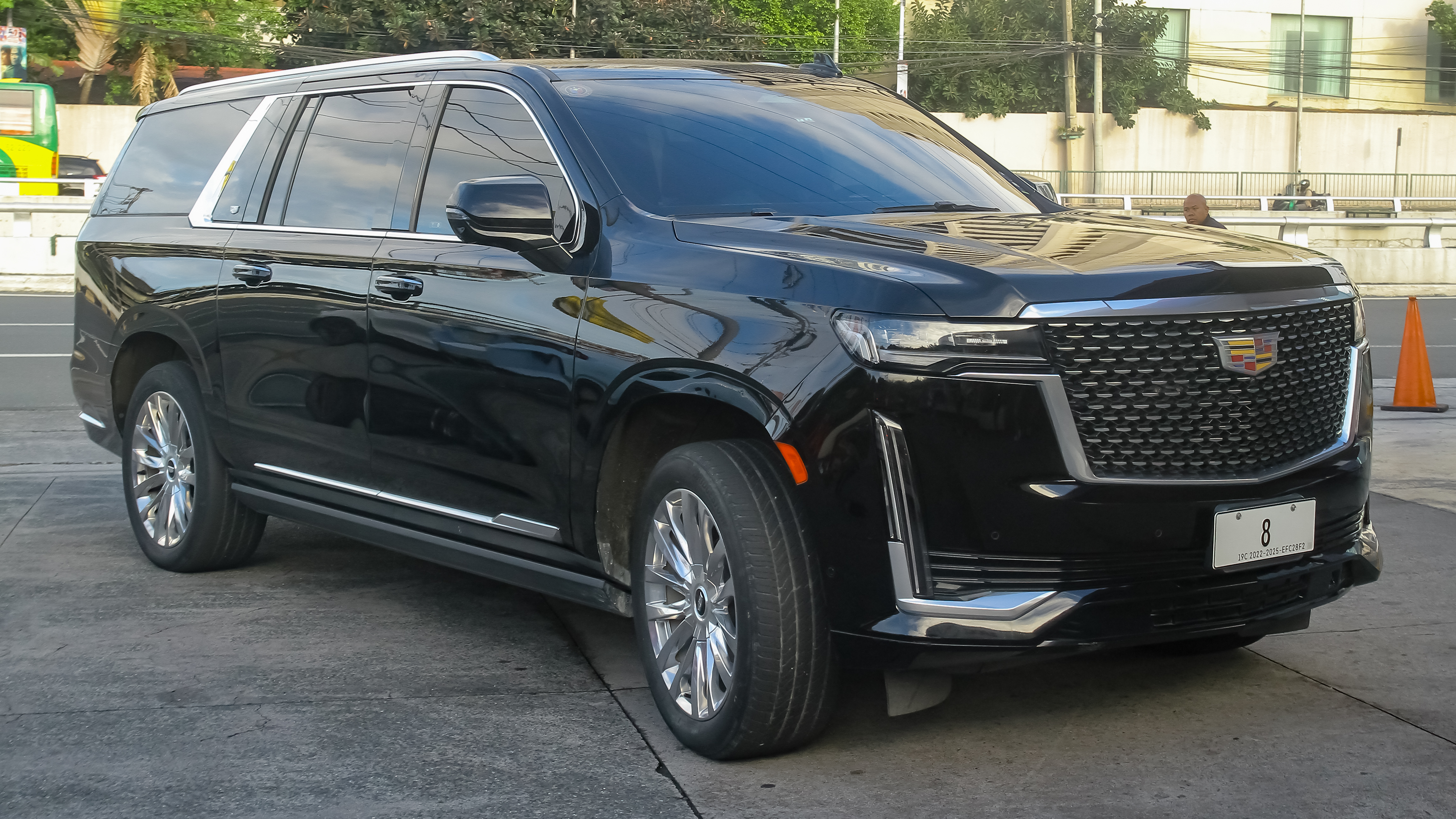
Cadillac Escalade

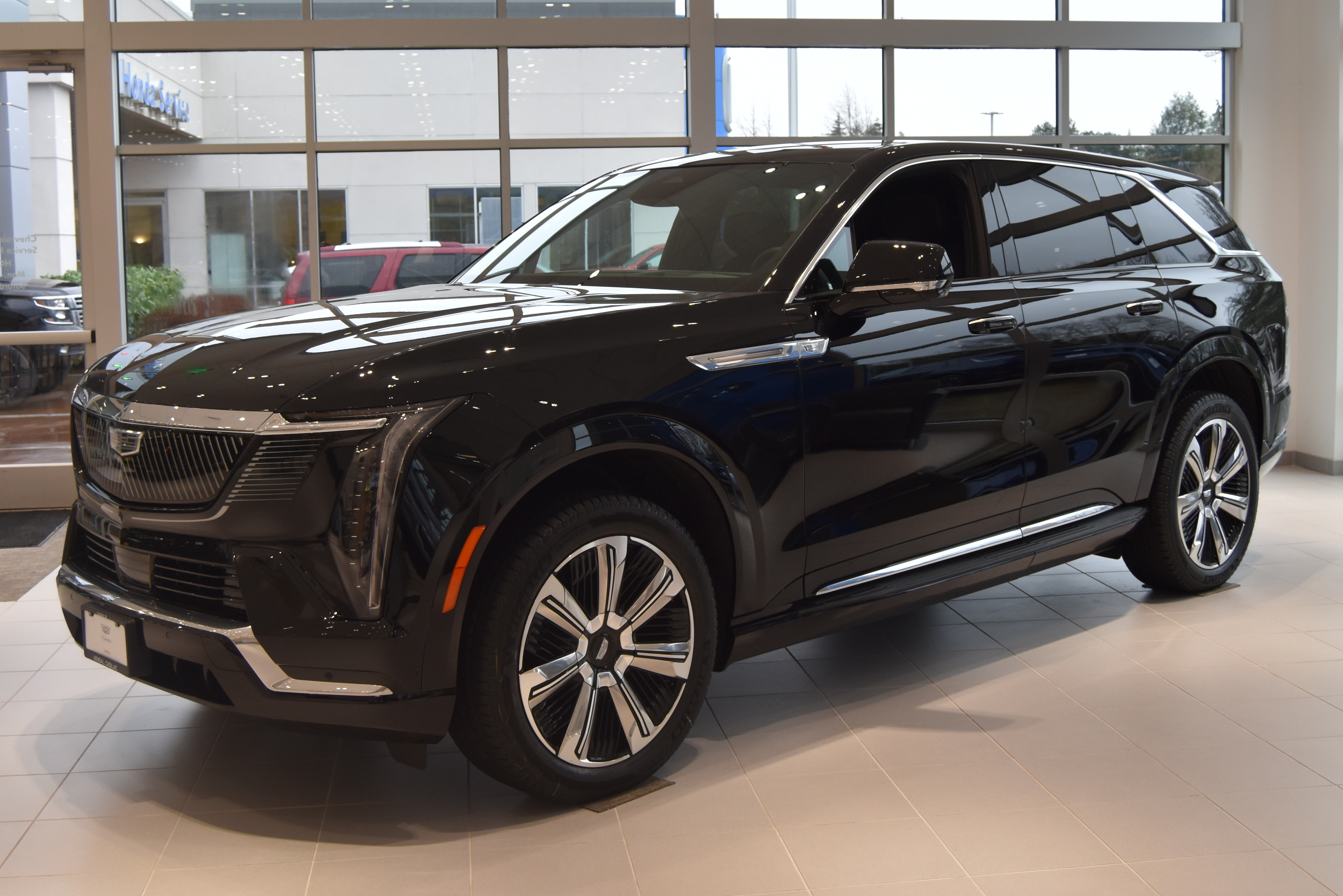
Cadillac Escalade IQ

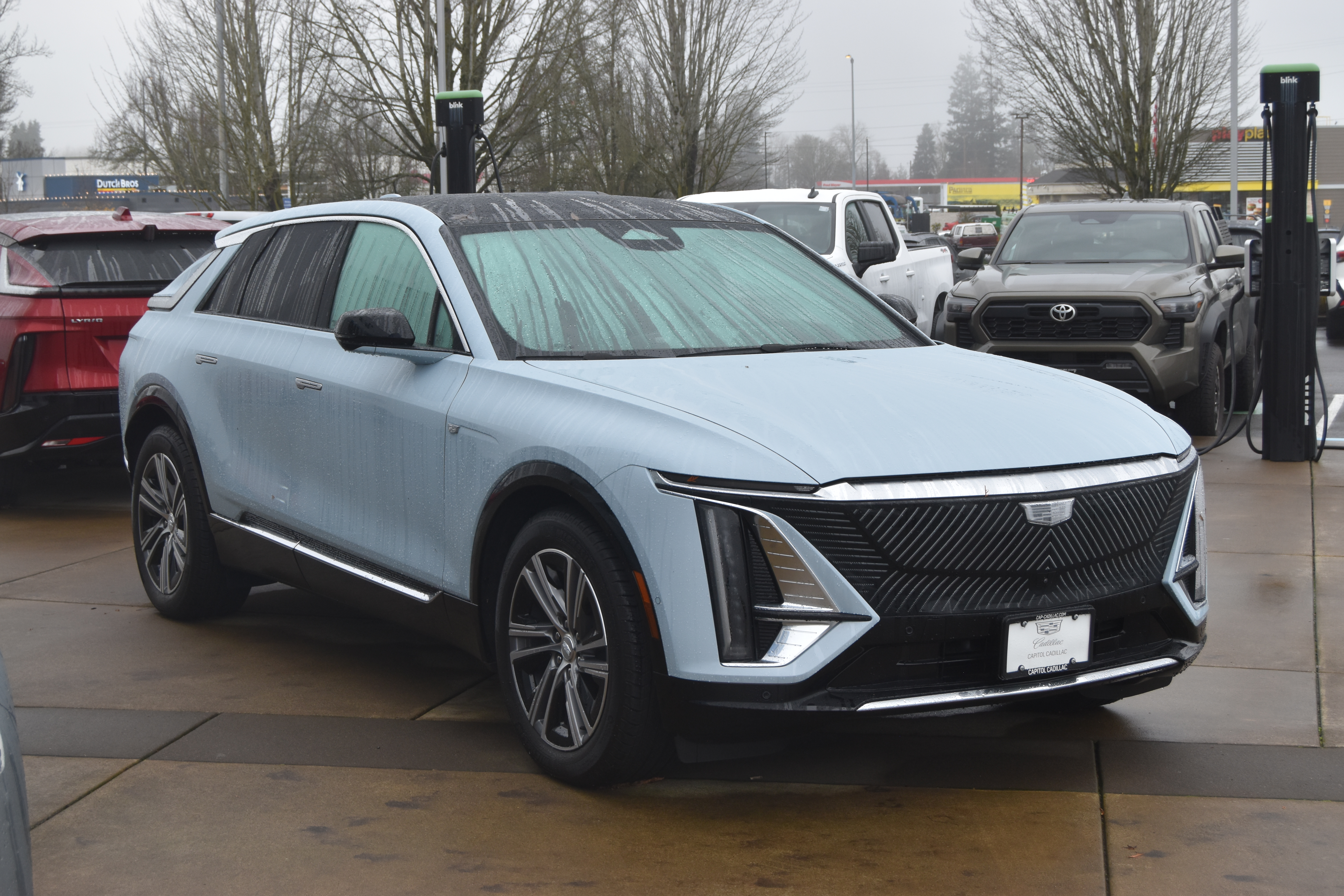
Cadillac Lyriq

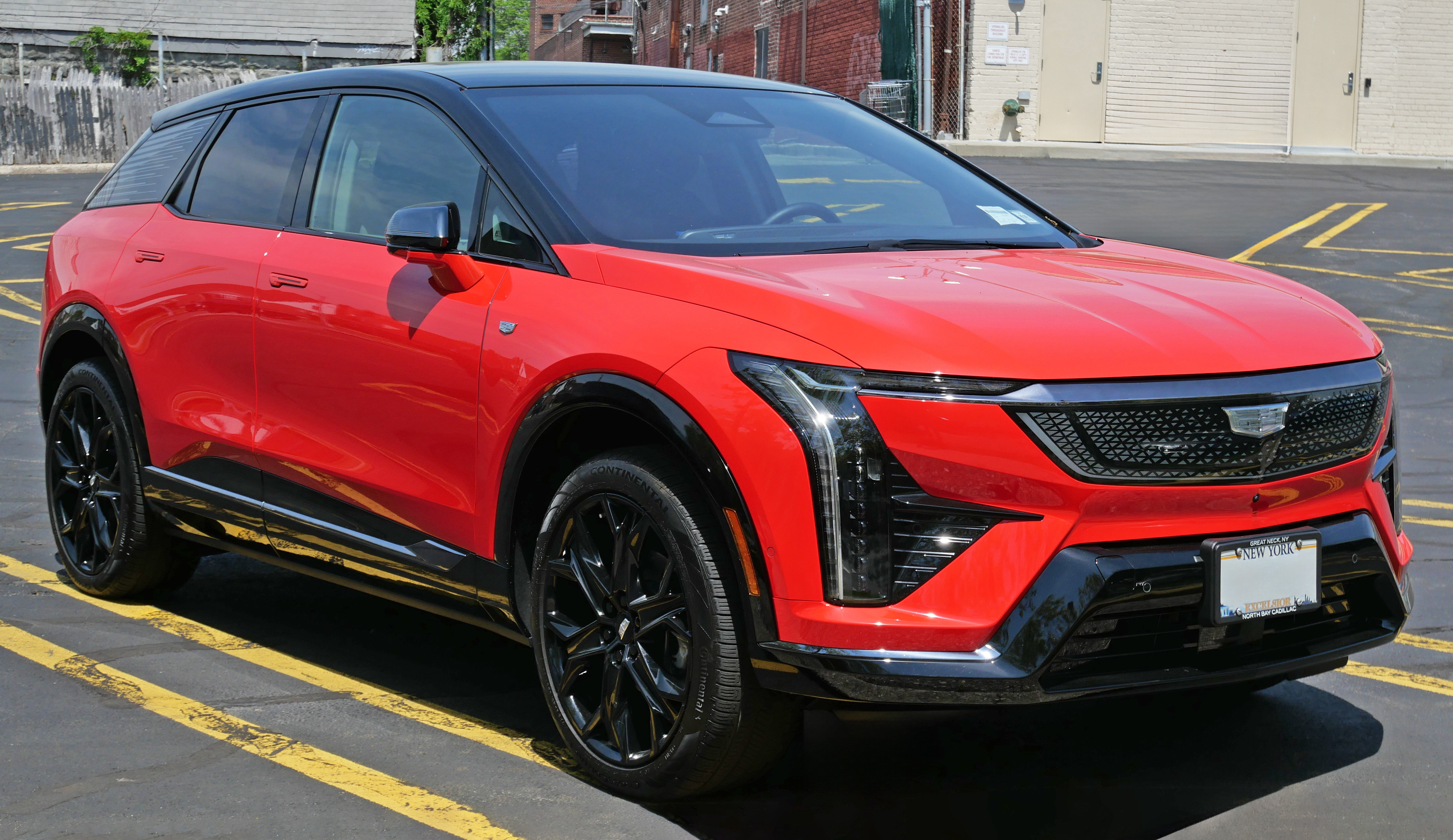
Cadillac Optiq

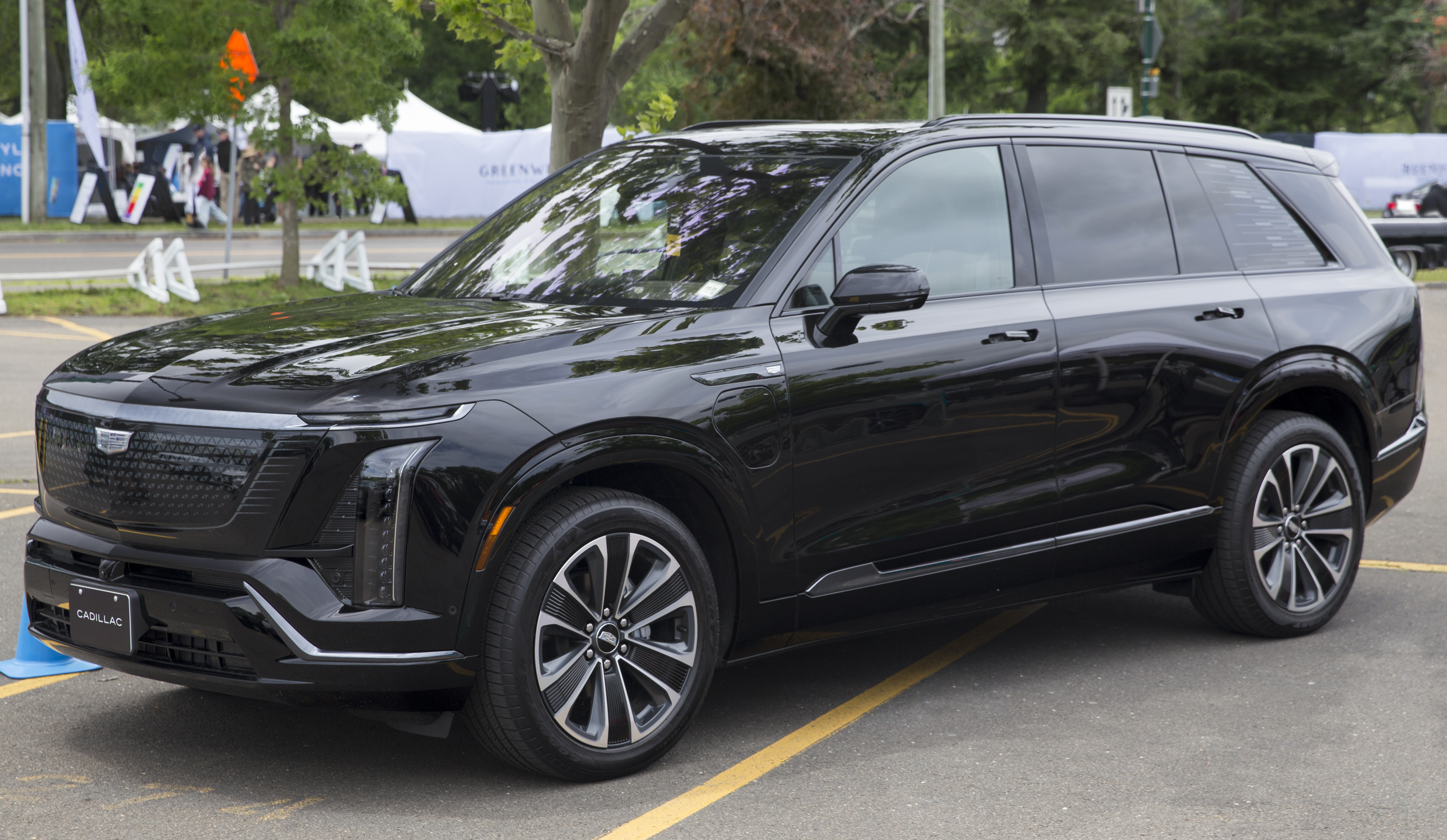
Cadillac Vistiq

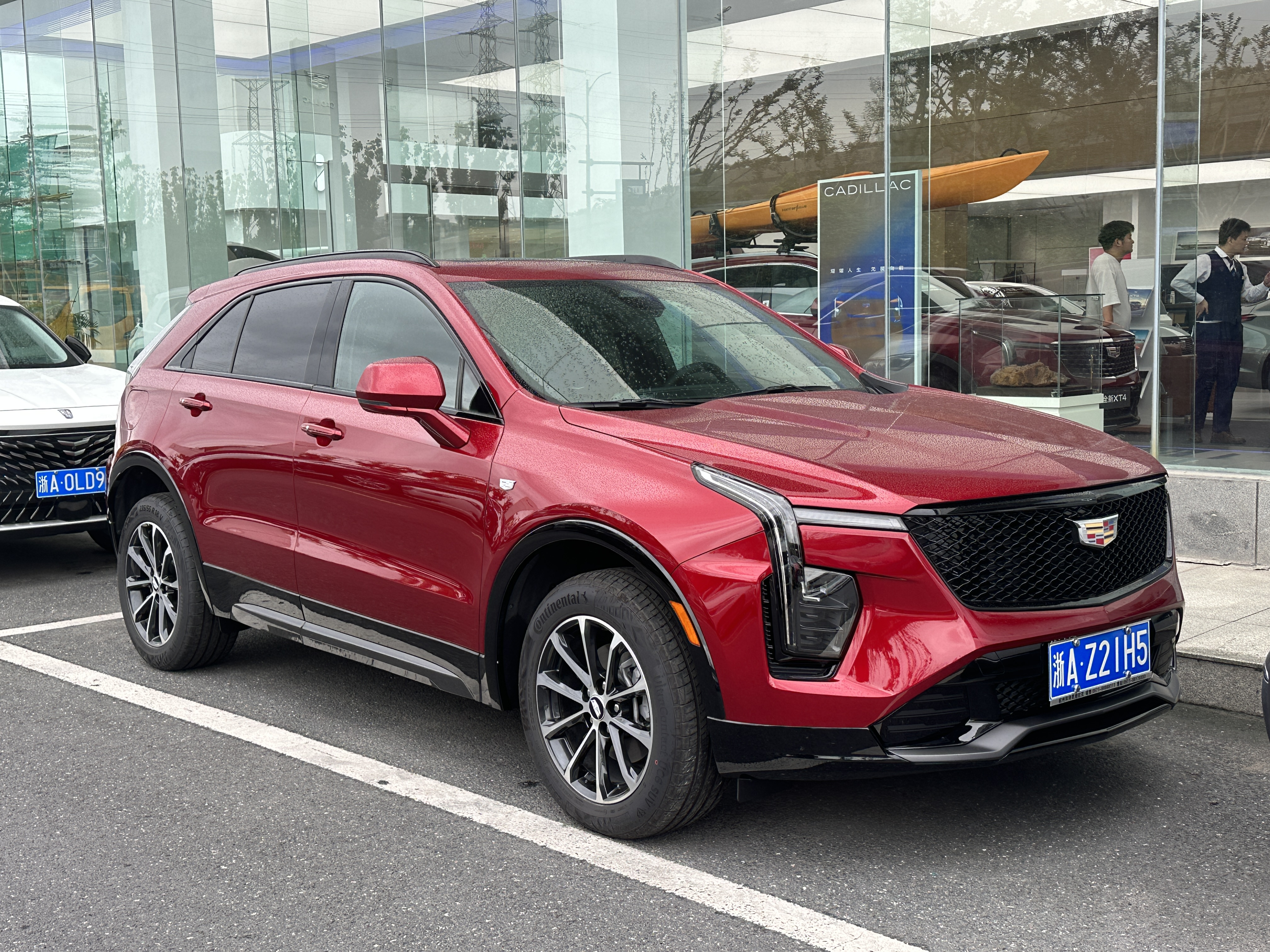
Cadillac XT4

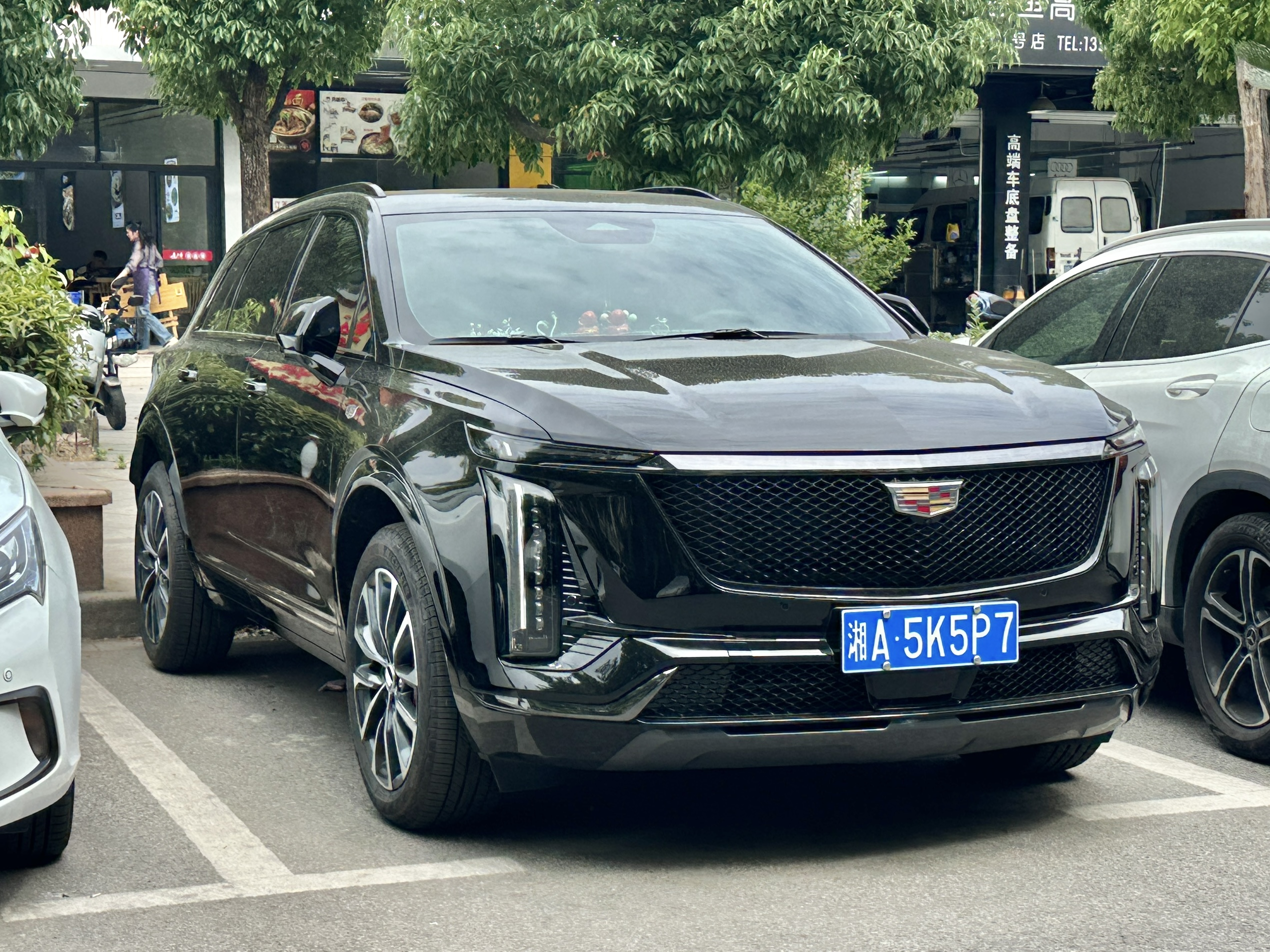
Cadillac XT5

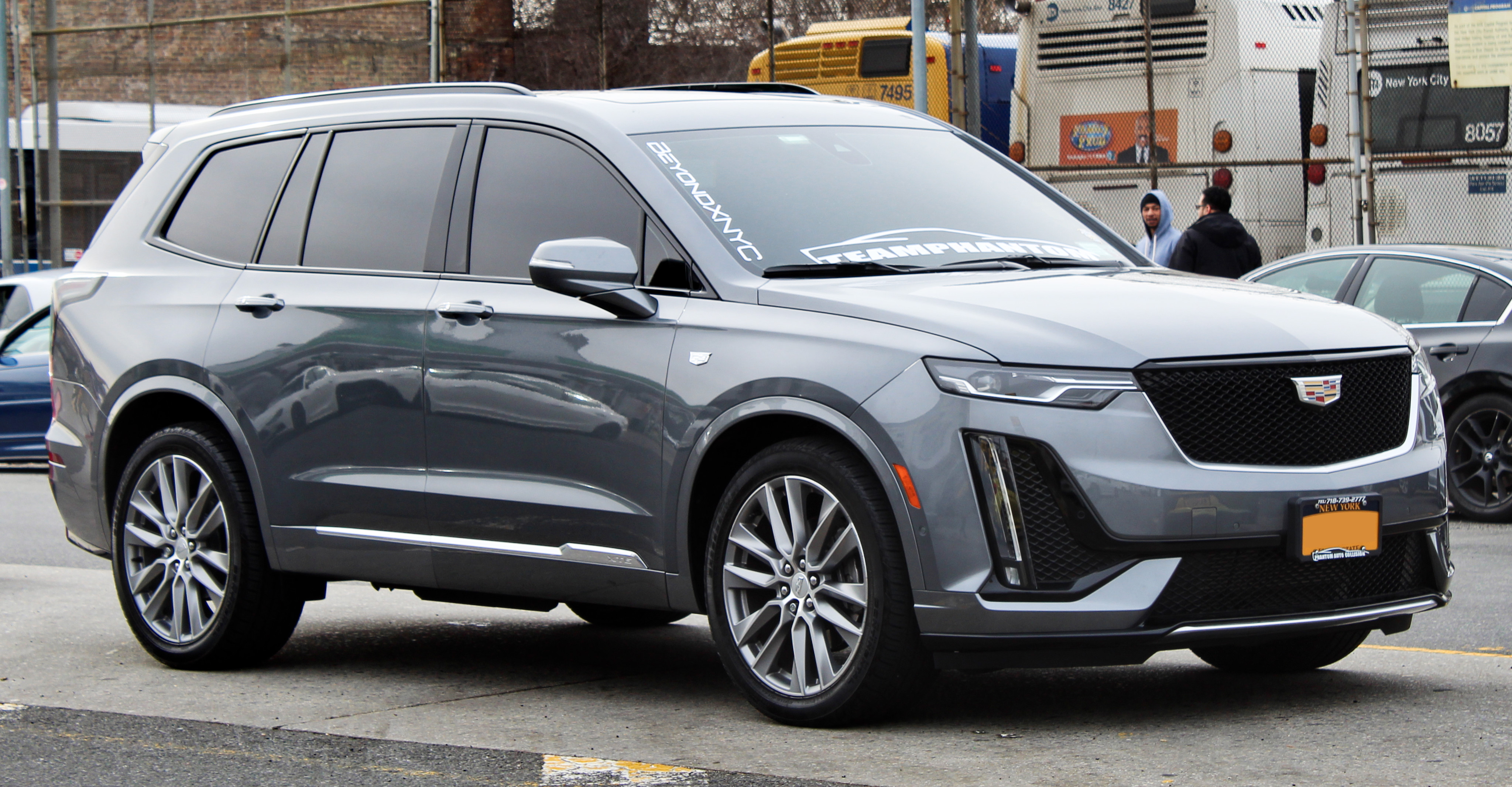
Cadillac XT6

== Assembly plants ==
- Global Technical Center, Warren, Michigan, U.S.
  - Cadillac Celestiq
- Detroit/Hamtramck Assembly, Michigan, U.S.
  - Cadillac Escalade IQ
- Lansing Grand River Assembly, Michigan, U.S.
  - Cadillac CT5
- Arlington Assembly, Texas, U.S.
  - Cadillac Escalade, Cadillac Escalade ESV
- Spring Hill Manufacturing, Tennessee, U.S.
  - Cadillac Lyriq
  - Cadillac Vistiq
- Shanghai GM, China
  - Cadillac CT5, Cadillac CT6, Cadillac Vistiq, Cadillac XT4, Cadillac XT5, Cadillac XT6
- Ramos Arizpe Assembly, Coahuila, Mexico
  - Cadillac Optiq

== Advertisements ==
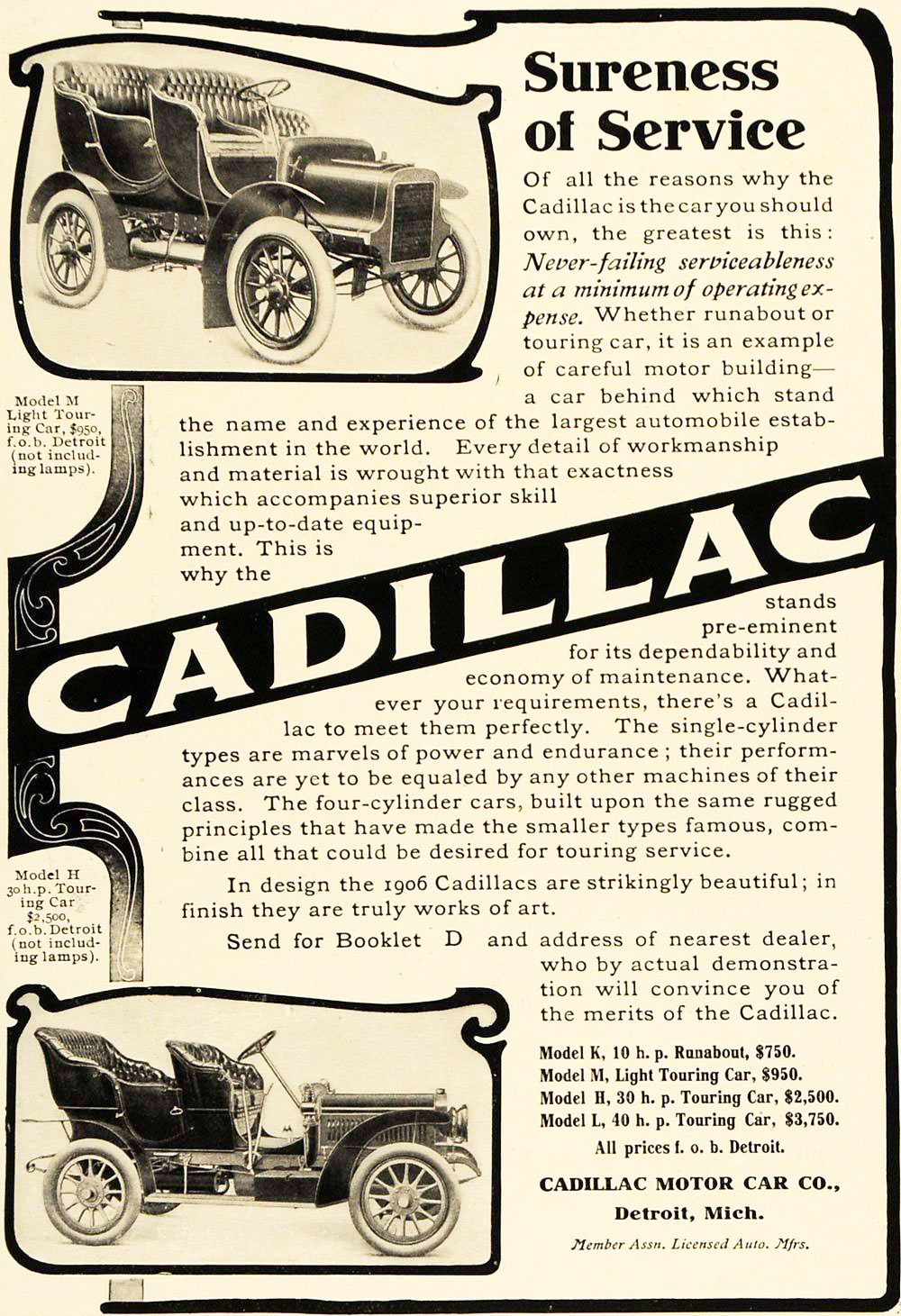
1906

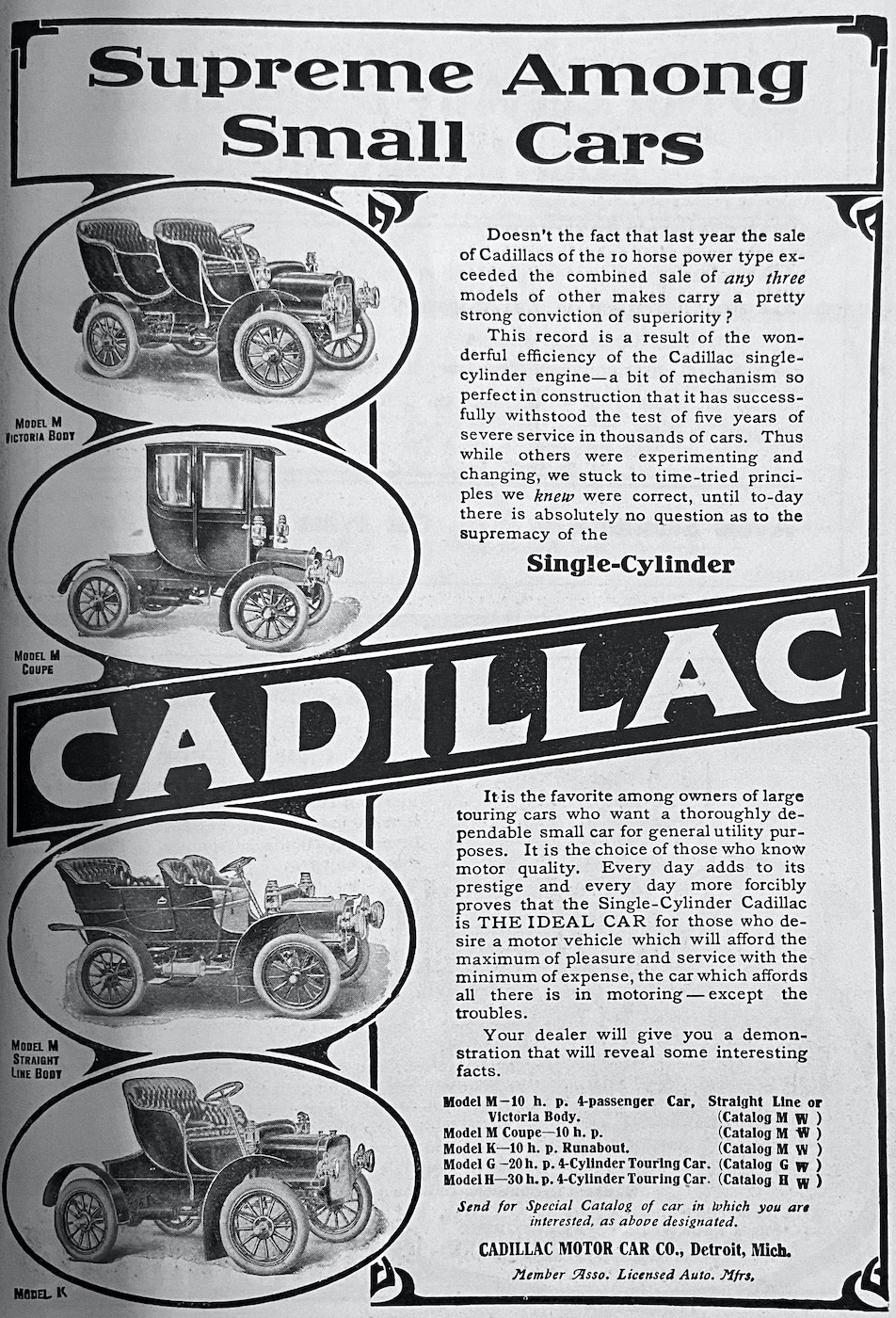
1907

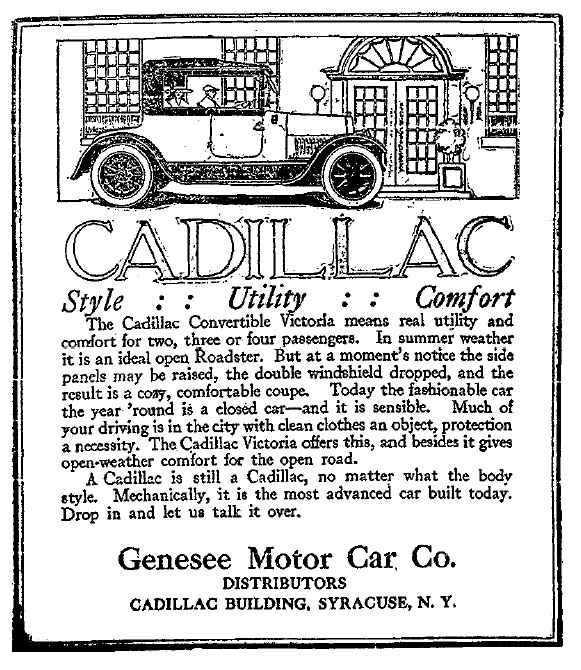
Syracuse Herald, 30 September 1917

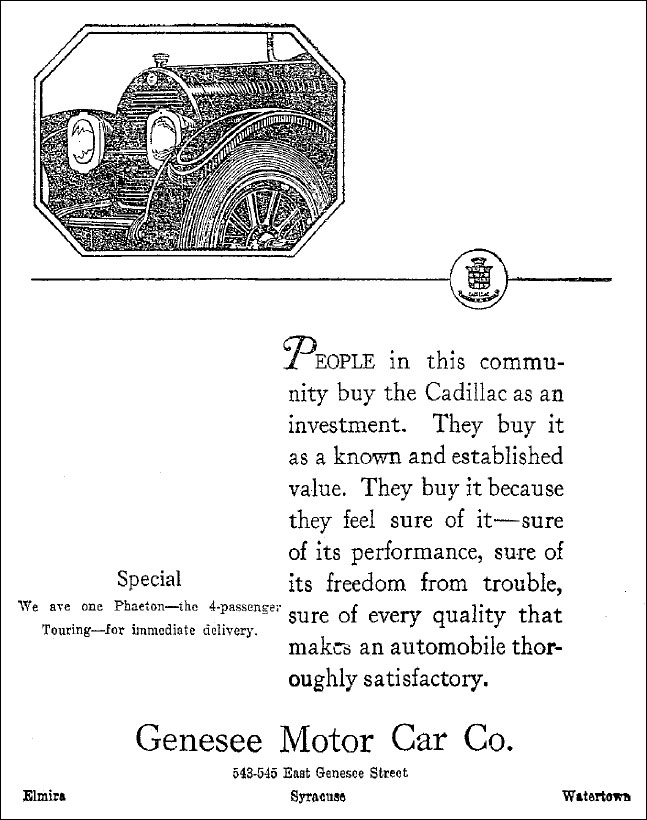
Syracuse Herald, 30 September 1917

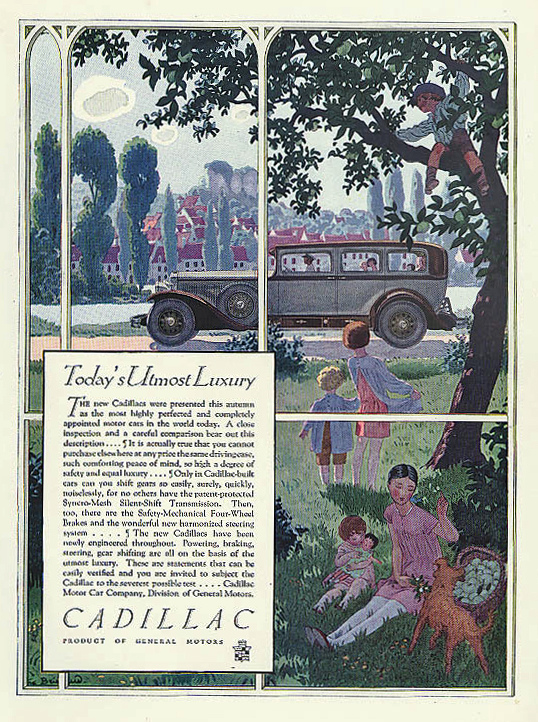
1930

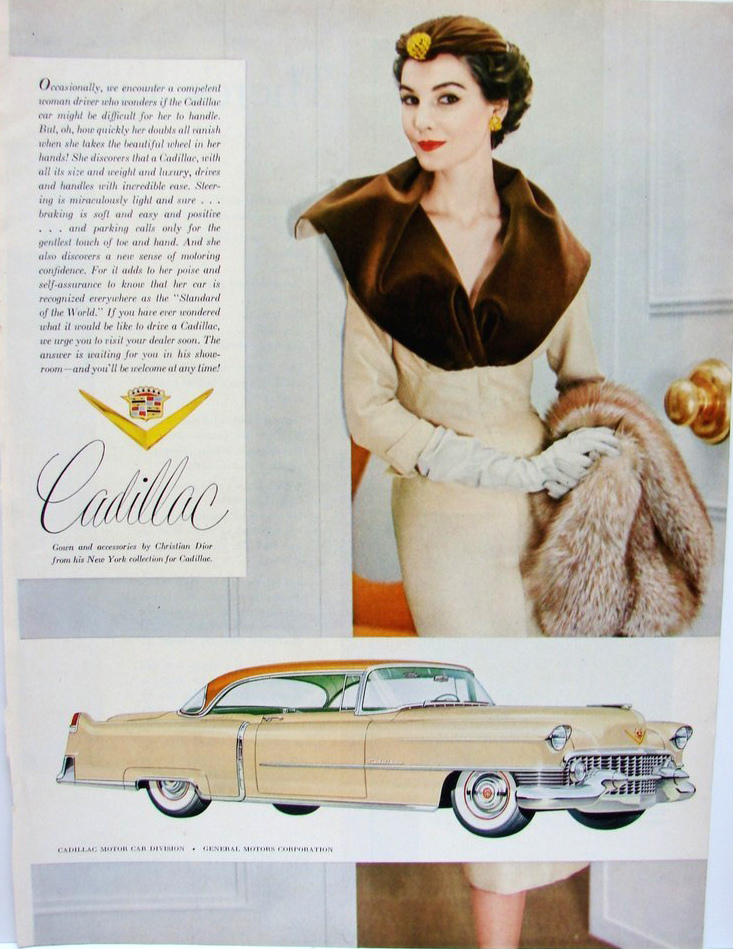
1954

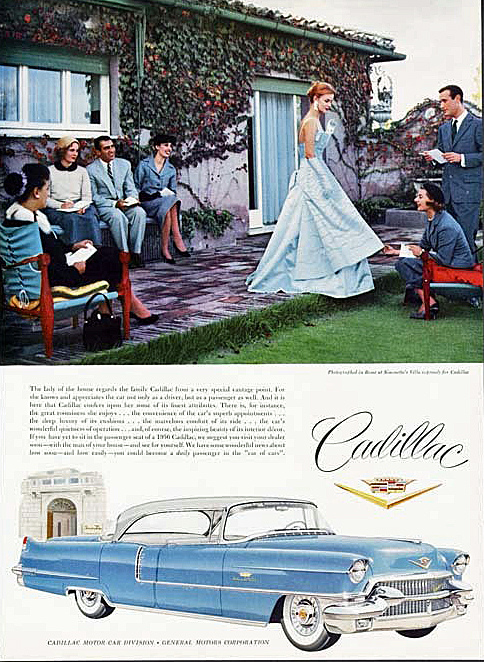
1956

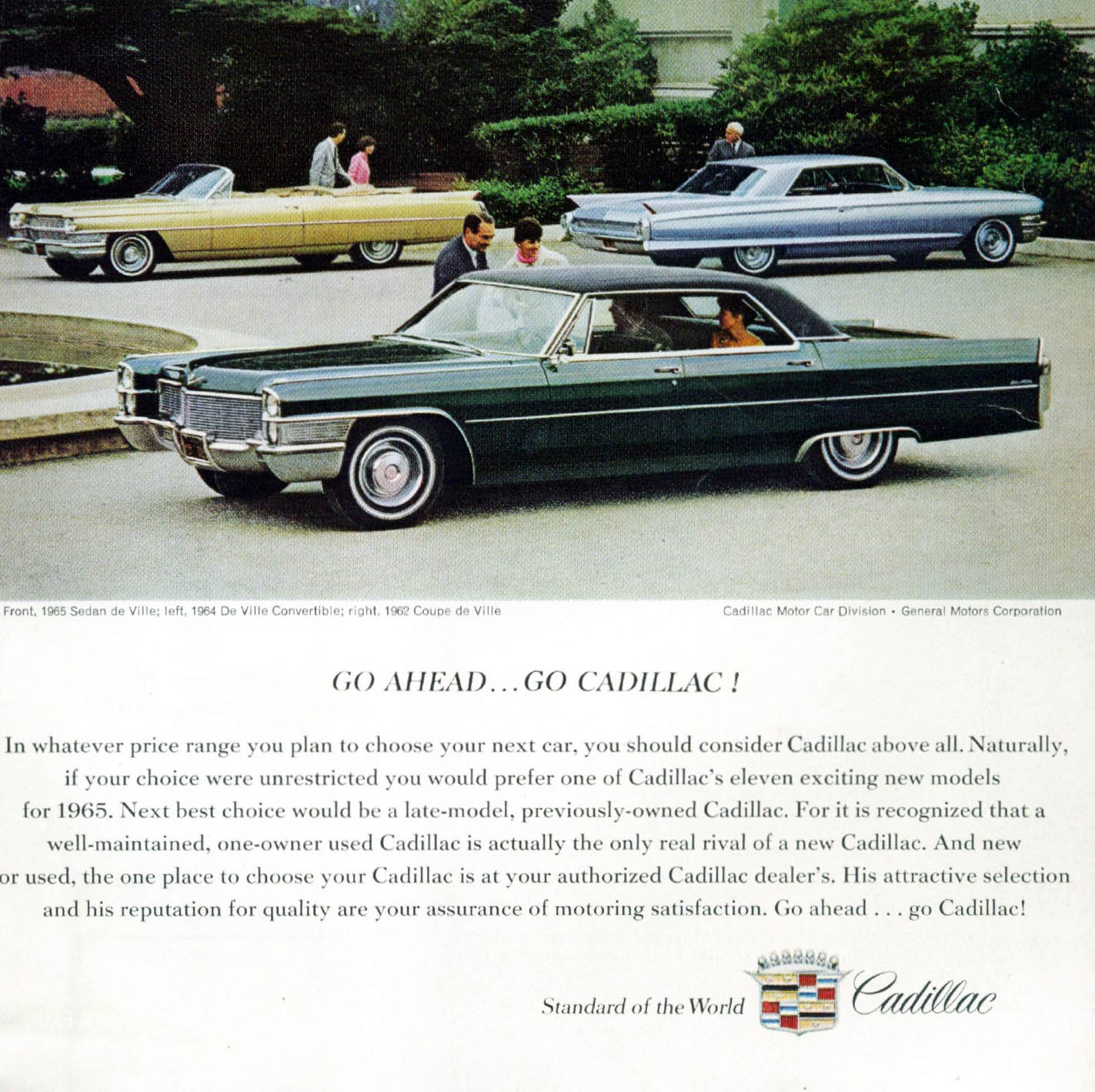
1965

== Awards ==
Cadillac has won the Motor Trend Car of the Year award five times:

1949 Cadillac Motor Division—for innovations in overhead valve V8 engine design
1952 Cadillac Motor Division
1992 Cadillac Seville Touring Sedan
2008 Cadillac CTS
2014 Cadillac CTS

== Motorsports ==
Cadillac Racing logo

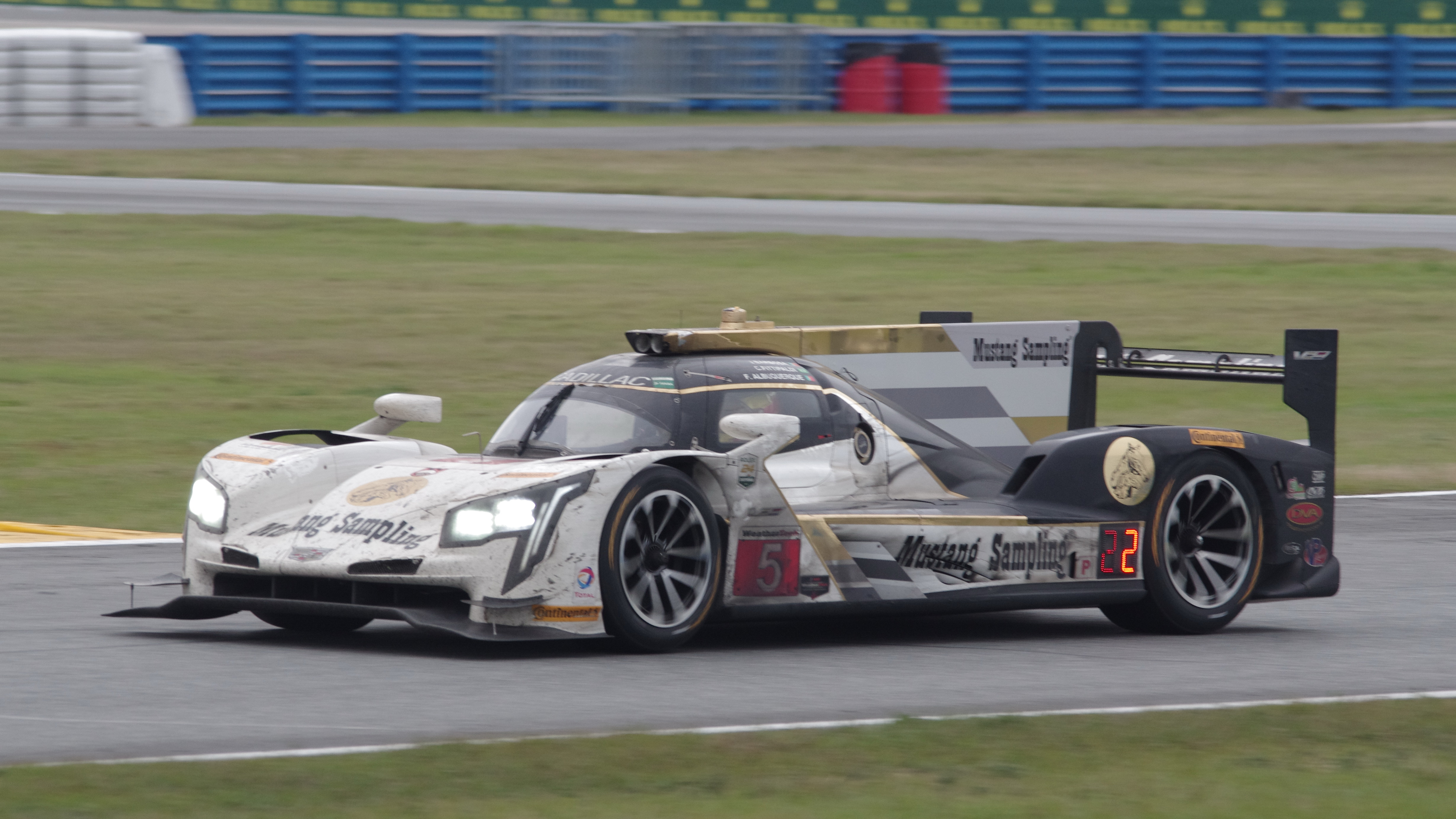
Cadillac DPi-V.R

Before the outbreak of World War II, Cadillac (like most manufacturers) participated in various motorsports. Many Allard automobiles used Cadillac engines.

In the 1950s, Cadillac (like all American manufacturers at the time) participated in the NASCAR Grand National Series, but stopped taking part by the 1960s.

Cadillac powered the Cadillac Northstar LMP, a Le Mans Prototype, in the early years of the American Le Mans Series from 2000 to 2002, but withdrew when it proved unsuccessful. Cadillac's most successful venture into motorsports in the 21st century has been its use of the CTS-V in the SCCA World Challenge Grand Touring class. Cadillac returned to prototype racing in 2017 with the Cadillac DPi-V.R in the WeatherTech SportsCar Championship, with considerable success.

In 2023, Cadillac entered its Cadillac V-Series.R into the FIA World Endurance Championship and IMSA SportsCar Championship. An official manufacturer entry was entered with Chip Ganassi Racing in both FIA World Endurance Championship and IMSA SportsCar Championship as full season entries. Cadillac also provided customer cars to Action Express Racing. It will also enter in 2024.

=== Formula One ===
On January 5, 2023, Cadillac's parent company General Motors announced their intention to enter the Cadillac brand into the Formula One World Championship in conjunction with Andretti Global. After initial rejection by the Formula One Group, Cadillac was allowed to enter from the 2026 season, using a Ferrari engine until their own engine was ready for 2029.

=== Racecars ===
Year	Car	Image	Category
2000	Cadillac Northstar LMP		LMP900
2002	Cadillac Northstar LMP02		LMP900
2014	Cadillac CTS-V		GT3
2015	Cadillac ATS-V.R GT3		GT3
2017	Cadillac DPi-V.R		DPi
2023	Cadillac V-Series.R		LMDh
2026	Cadillac MAC-26		F1

== See also ==
- Cadillac Northstar engine
- Cadillac V-Series
- Cadillac V8 engine
- LaSalle (automobile), companion make to Cadillac, 1927–1940
- List of Cadillac vehicles
